= Anton Novakov =

Romanian Bulgarian and Gagauz businessman and politician (died 1938)

Anton Novakov or Novacov (Bulgarian: Антон Новаков; died September 1938) was a Bessarabian industrialist and legislator of the Moldavian Democratic Republic, of Bulgarian and Gagauz background. He was originally active in the Russian Empire's Bessarabia Governorate, where he organized credit unions. In late 1917, the co-operative network elected him to the Bessarabian council, or Sfatul Țării, which proclaimed the Moldavian Republic in December. Novakov served on the commission to Combat Anarchy and helped organize a republican militia. His absence during the vote on Bessarabia's unification with Romania in March 1918 was partly explained by his missions in the field, though allegations later surfaced that he had actively conspired against the union's recognition. He lived the remainder of his life in Romanian Bessarabia, and integrated into the political life of Greater Romania: originally a member of the People's Party, he subsequently became a National Liberal. In the late 1920s, Novakov was involved in a legal battle with the Romanian state, over benefits he claimed were owed to him as a former member of the Sfatul.

== Biography ==
Novakov's origins are credited as belonging to either of two intertwined communities of the Governorate: scholars refer to him as a Bulgarian or a Gagauz; at least one archival record has "Gagauz-Bulgarian". As historian Ivan Duminică noted in 2019, the only known facts about Novakov's early life in the Russian Empire are his status as a cashier for the credit unions in Bender County and his listing as an "industrialist". He was sent to Sfatul Țării by a transnational guild, the Union of Credit Co-operatives, alongside four "Moldavians": Gheorghe Buruiană, Teodor Corobceanu, Ion Cazacliu, and Vladimir Chiorescu. The Union had been assigned the five seats at a Sfatul session on 6 November 1917, with Chiorescu's mandate being recorded as beginning on 15 November. According to Duminică, Novakov was a Bulgarian-and-Gagauz delegate inasmuch as he specifically represented co-operatives formed in the Budjak.

On 22 November, Novakov was elected to a 12-member Validation Commission, chaired by Nicolae Bosie-Codreanu, which verified the legality of his colleagues' mandates. He later also served on Commission to Combat Anarchy, and the Commission for Statements and Charters. His tenure saw the Moldavian Republic's absorption into the Kingdom of Romania. He was one of the thirteen deputies who absented during the actual vote on unification, which took place on 27 March 1918. Most other Bulgarian-and-Gagauz delegates abstained, while Novakov and Dumitru Topciu explained that they were on official duty to Tighina, helping to resupply the Bessarabian troops against Bolshevik insurgents (the Rumcherod). Allegations that he had in fact opposed the union resurfaced later, when the Bolsheviks established a Ukrainian Soviet Socialist Republic on Romania's new eastern border. In early 1925, Bolshevik historian A. Ryabinin-Sklyarevski claimed to have recovered from Odesa an autographed "protest against Bessarabia's union", carrying Novakov's signature as a "delegate of the co-operatives"; other signatories reportedly included Jacob Bernstein-Kohan, Alexander N. Krupensky, Alexander Schmidt, Pantelimon V. Sinadino, and Vasily Yanovsky.

As noted in 1925 by historian (and former Moldavian Premier) Petru Cazacu, Novakov and most alleged signatories of the Odesa letter "became Romanian citizens and live peacefully under Romania's protection". Novakov continued to reside and work in Chișinău, at 15 Alecsandri Street, and joined the local Chamber of Commerce and Industry. Recruited by the People's Party (PP), he ran for the national Senate in the Tighina County by-elections of September 1920, taking 3,761 votes; the seat went to Vartolomeu Sucitu of the Peasantists, with 6,795. Novakov organized and helped steer the party's county section. During the senatorial by-election of 1925, he rallied the peasants of Mereni in support of the PP's candidate, Sergiu Niță; at the time he was also chairman of the millers' regional syndicate. He ultimately quit the PP in September of that year, immediately joining the National Liberals. Also that month, he supported, and ran on, an Independent List of Chamber candidates, being voted in as a junior member of the unified council. In June 1926, Novakov was Chamber delegate on the Board of Review for Foreign Nationals, advising the Labor Inspectorate. His parallel delegation to the Tighina County council was vetoed by the Prefect.

Novakov joined a club of former Sfatul deputies, and, like the vast majority of its members, voted to attend the union's 10-year anniversary on 29 April 1928. By then, he was litigating over the issue of his not being allocated land reserved for Sfatul delegates who had supported the union, but lost his case when presented in court. In 1930, after defaulting on outstanding debt, his wife Maria was forced to sell her home in Mereni. Anton's "premature death" was announced by the Tighina Federation of Co-operatives on 14 September 1938. In August 1940, weeks after the Soviet invasion of Bessarabia, his widow was recorded, as an old-age pensioner from Tighina, among the "Romanian refugees who have crossed from Bessarabia to Romania at Ungheni checkpoint". The authorities granted her a new home in Buzău.
