= Daniel Ciugureanu Cabinet =

Second cabinet of the Moldavian Democratic Republic

Daniel Ciugureanu Cabinet was the Cabinet of Moldova (16 January 1918 – 8 April 1918).

It was the second cabinet of the Moldavian Democratic Republic.

== Membership of the Cabinet ==
- Daniel Ciugureanu, President of the Council
- Ion Pelivan, Minister of Foreign Affairs
- Vladimir Cristi, Minister of Internal Affairs
- Constantin Brăescu, Minister of War
- Mihail Savenco, Minister of Justice
- Teofil Ioncu, Minister of Finance
- Pantelimon Erhan, Minister of Public Instruction
- Nicolae Bosie-Codreanu, Minister of Communications
- Veniamin I. Grinfeld, Minister of Industry and Commerce
- Anton Crihan, Minister of Agriculture
- Vladislov Podwinsky, the State Controller of Bessarabia

== Notes ==
Preceded by Pantelimon Erhan Cabinet	Daniel Ciugureanu Cabinet of Moldova; 29 January [O.S. 16 January] 1918 - 21 April [O.S. 8 April] 1918	Succeeded by Petru Cazacu Cabinet
