= 1917 Bessarabian parliamentary election =

Moldavian election

Indirect elections for the Sfatul Țării were held in Bessarabia in November 1917. The members were elected by the various congresses, soviets, parties and professional and ethnic organizations following the Russian Revolution.

== Background ==
On 5 November [O.S. 23 October] - 9 November [O.S. 27 October] 1917, the Soldiers' council proclaimed the autonomy of Bessarabia, and summoned for the election of a representative body (diet), called Sfatul Țării. The council prescribed the number of representatives allocated to each organization, and imposed a fixed ethnic composition, significantly different from the one recorded by previous Russian Imperial censuses. Of the 150 Diet members of Sfatul Țării, 105 were Moldavians, 15 Ukrainians, 13 Jews, 6 Russians, 3 Bulgarians, 2 Germans, 2 Gagauzians, 1 Pole, 1 Armenian, 1 Greek, 1 unknown.

== Aftermath ==
The first session of Sfatul Țării was held on 4 December [O.S. 21 November] 1917, and chose Ion Inculeț as its president.

On 21 December [O.S. 8 December] 1917, Sfatul Țării elected the Pantelimon Erhan Cabinet (named the Council of Directors General), with nine members and with Pantelimon Erhan as President of the Council of Directors General and Director General for Agriculture.

After some long talks, on 15 December [O.S. 2 December] 1917, Sfatul Țării proclaimed the Moldavian Democratic Federative Republic, with Ion Inculeț as President.

== See also ==
- 1918 Transylvanian legislative election
