= Teodor Cojocaru =

Bessarabian military commander and politician (1879–1941)

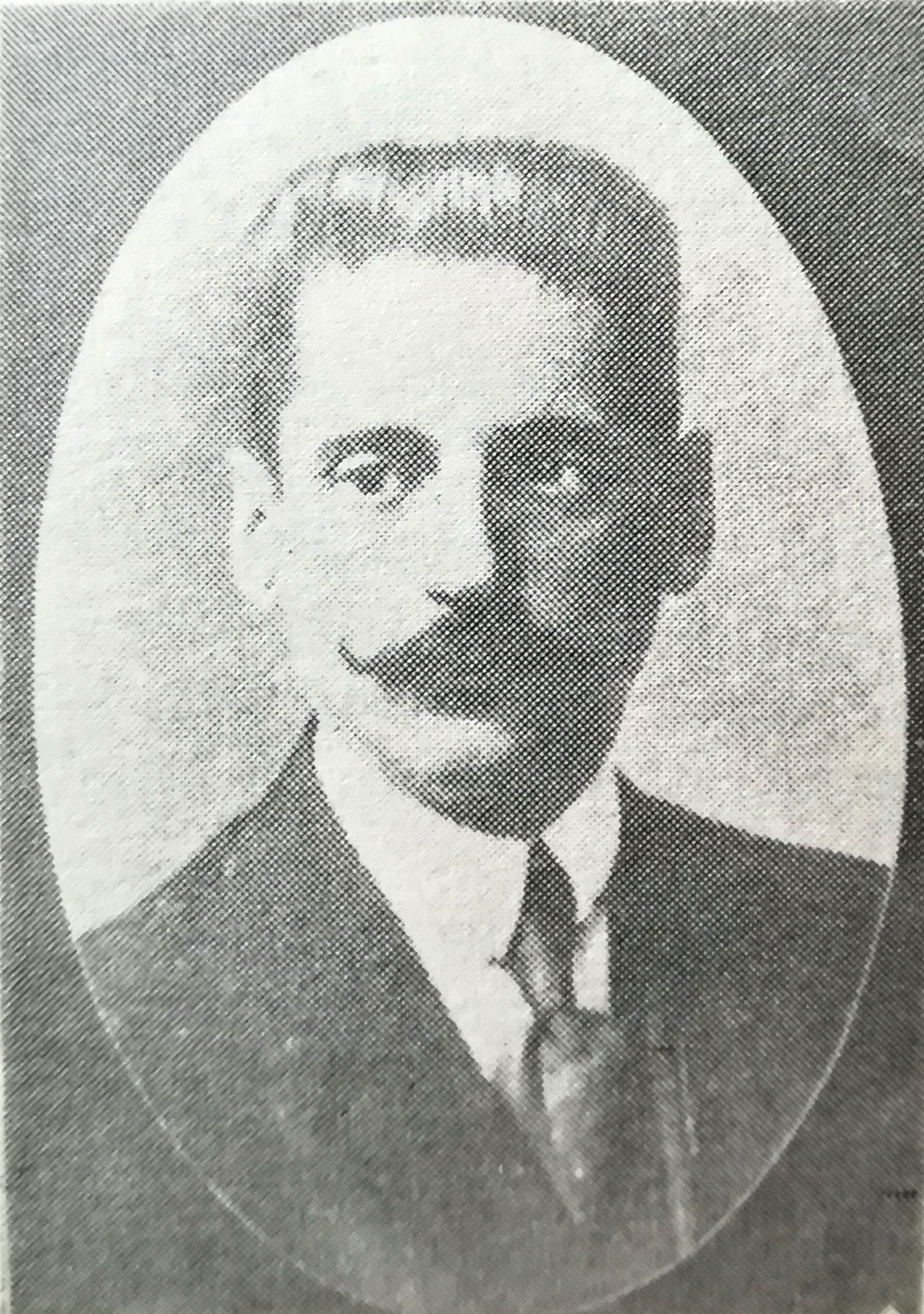
- Cojocaru in 1917

Member of the Moldovan Parliament
- In office 1917–1918

Director General for Armed Forces
- In office 1917 – 13 December 1917
- President: Ion Inculeț
- Prime Minister: Pantelimon Erhan
- Succeeded by: Gherman Pântea

Mayor of Chișinău
- In office 1919–1920
- Preceded by: Vladimir Herța
- Succeeded by: Iulian Levinski

Member of the Russian Constituent Assembly
- In office 1917–1918

Member of the Chamber of Deputies of Romania
- In office 1919–1920

Personal details
- Born: 3 May 1879 Bubuieci, Bessarabia Governorate, Russian Empire
- Died: 23 January 1941 (aged 61) Chișinău, Moldavian SSR, USSR
- Party: Moldavian National Party
- Profession: Military

Teodor Cojocaru (pronunciation: [koʒoˈkaru]; 3 May 1879 – 23 January 1941) was a Moldovan military and politician. He served as Director General for Armed Forces in the Pantelimon Erhan Cabinet, and as a member of the Sfatul Țării and Romanian Parliament, and was the mayor of Chișinău from 1919 until 1920. Teodor Cojocaru was also a deputy in the Romanian Parliament for a short period between 1919-1920.

== Biography ==
=== Its interaction with Soviet hordes ===
On 13 August 1940 he was arrested by the Soviet authorities, being abusively accused of committing crimes under Articles 54-4, 54-13 and 54-11 of the Criminal Code of the Ukrainian SSR. He died in Prison No. 1 in Chișinău.
