= Colibași, Cahul =

Colibași
- Village
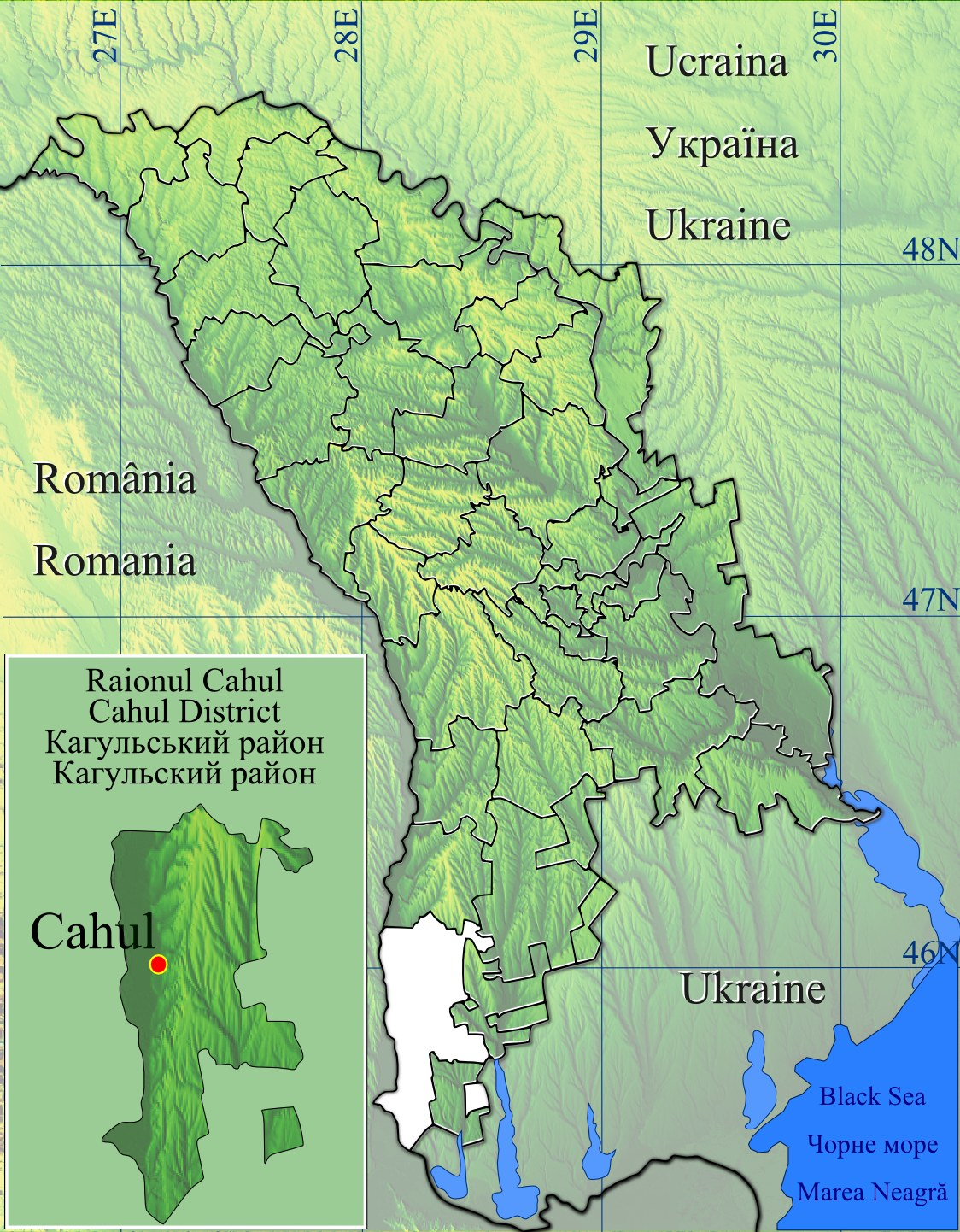
- Location of village within Moldova
- Coordinates: 45°44′N 28°10′E
- Country: Moldova
- District: Cahul District

Area
  - Metro: 2,325 sq mi (6,021 km^{2})

Population (2014 census)
  - Village: 5,378
- Time zone: UTC+2 (EET)
  - Summer (DST): UTC+3 (EEST)

Colibași is a village within Cahul District, southwest of Moldova. The village is located adjacent to the border of Romania, some 35 km (22 mi) to the north of Galați.

== History ==
For the first time the Colibaşi settlement was mentioned in the XVII century. Officially, Colibaşi was first documented in the year 1711, although it is thought that the village was inhabited much earlier. It is believed that the name "Colibași" is related to the shepherds who walked their sheep flock towards this place in search for wealthy grasslands. Once here they have capitalised on the wild steppes and the natural riches of the Prut riverside. As a result, huts started to appear on the left bank of the river Prut. The settlers who built them were nicknamed colibaşi (a word believed to derive from the Romanian word coliba, hut). Hence the name of the village, Colibași.

Other theories in regards to village's name and its origins have been debated by some. The Doctor of Historical Sciences V.M. Kabuzan claims in his monograph "Narodonasilenie Bessarabskoi oblast i levoberejnih raionov Pridnestrovia" that the village bears the name of Colibași (or Culibași) - a name he argues is linked to Ottoman rule.

During settlements in southern Bessarabia, the village of Colibași, as well as other villages in Budjak region, was home to natives from Bulgaria and Ukraine and from that period on it became one of the largest village in the country. Already in 1850 over 740 people were living here, who worked with the earth and fruit growing.

== Notable people ==
- Chiril Sberea
