= Stavri =

Stavri is both an Albanian masculine given name and surname. Notable people with the name include:

== Given name ==
- Stavri Lubonja (1935–2024), Albanian footballer and manager
- Stavri Nica (born 1954), Albanian football coach

== Surname ==
- Artur Stavri (1869–1928), Romanian poet
- Stavro Stavri (1885–1955), Albanian diplomat

== See also ==
- Gheorghe Stavrii, Moldovan politician
