= Corestăuți =

- Commune
- Location in Moldova
- Coordinates: 48°21′N 27°15′E
- Country: Moldova
- District: Ocnița District
- Elevation: 820 ft (250 m)

Population (2014)
  - Total: 990
- Time zone: UTC+2 (EET)
  - Summer (DST): UTC+3 (EEST)
- Postal code: MD-7118
- Area code: +373 271

Corestăuți is a commune in Ocnița District, Moldova. It is composed of two villages, Corestăuți and Stălinești (depopulated as of 2014).

== Notable people ==
- Alexandru Moraru
