= Paliy =

Paliy or Palii (Ukrainian: Палій) is a Ukrainian surname. It may refer to:

- Andrei Palii (1940–2021), Moldovan agronomist
- Andrei Paliy (1971–2022), Russian naval officer
- Efimie Palii, Moldovan politician
- Ihor Paliy (born 1963), Ukrainian painter
- Ion Palii, Moldovan politician
- Semen Paliy (c. 1645 – 1710), Ukrainian Cossack
  - Paliy uprising, a Cossack uprising led by Semen Paliy
