= Sfatul Țării =

Legislature of Bessarabia and of the Moldavian Democratic Republic

"Council of the Country" Sfatul Țării

Type
- Type: Unicameral

Leadership
- President: Ion Inculeț
- Seats: 150

Elections
- Last election: 1917

Meeting place
- Sfatul Țării Palace, Chișinău

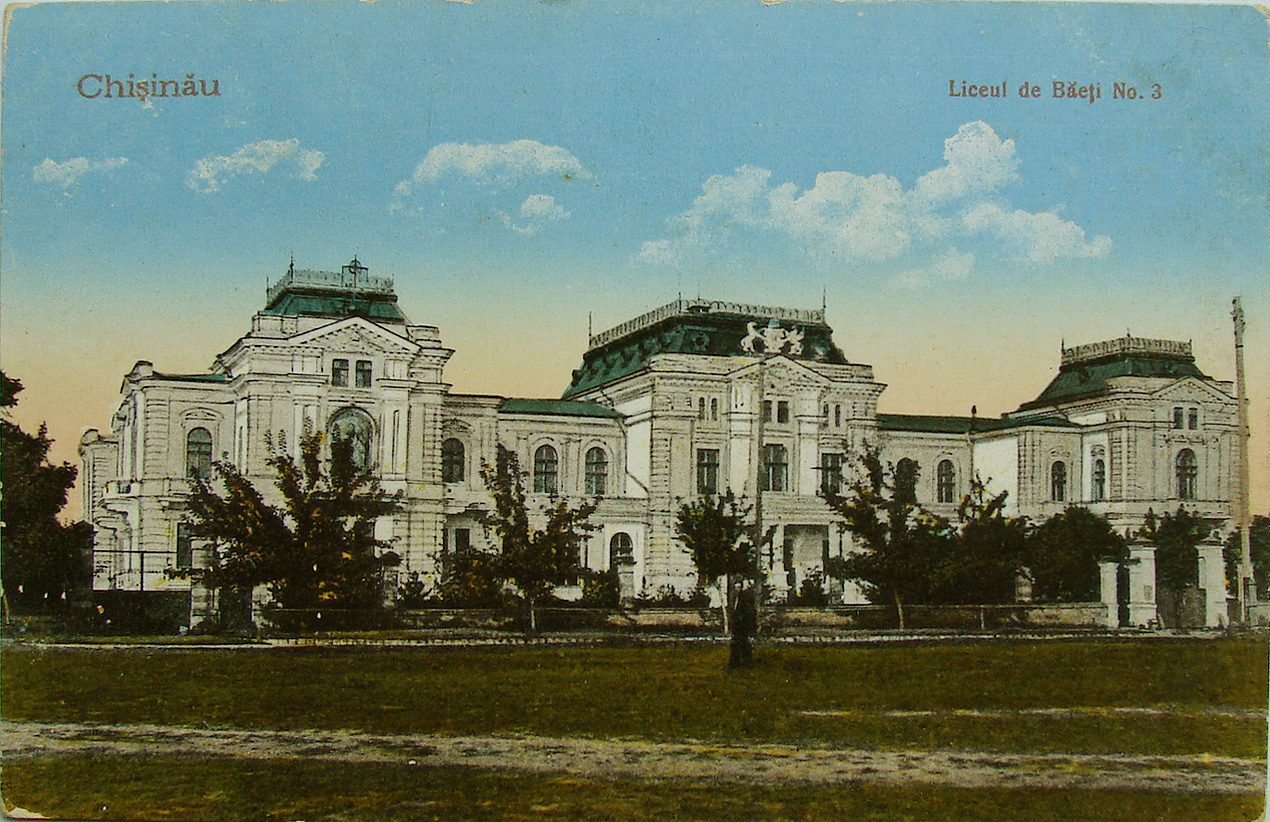
Sfatul Țării Palace

Sfatul Țării ("Council of the Country"; Romanian pronunciation: [ˈsfatul ˈt͡sərij]) was a council of political, public, cultural, and professional organizations in the Governorate of Bessarabia in Tsarist Russia. This became a legislative body which established the Moldavian Democratic Republic as part of the Russian Federative Republic in December 1917. and then union with Romania in April [O.S. March] 1918.

== Prelude and organization ==
=== Russian participation in World War I ===
In August 1914, the First World War started, and 300,000 Bessarabians were mobilized and enrolled in the army of the Russian Empire, the majority in the immediate wake of Russian defeat. By March 1917, the military actions on the Eastern Front came to a stalemate. Conferences of soldiers in the rear of the front line dominated. Many called for a Republic; the Tsar had abdicated in March 1917, but the Russian Provisional Government that took his place had not yet proclaimed the Empire a Republic until September 1917. They wanted social and economic changes, such as annulment of the privileges of the nobility, and an agrarian reform that would give the peasants the land they worked on.

Despite the bad situation, the Army of the Russian Empire did not disband. Soldiers continued to form units, but often officers were replaced by new, elected ones. Units continued to be stationed as before and would not move without the consent of the general command. The soldiers also started making political claims, such as land reform, permission to use the national language in administration and courts, as well as education and church services in the national language. Some Bessarabian soldiers had numerous occasions to interact with soldiers of the Kingdom of Romania, and with ethnic Romanians from Transylvania and Bukovina, many of the latter taken prisoners from the Austrian army, and organized in regiments now fighting on the Entente side.

Contacts between Romanian intelligentsia in Austria-Hungary and in Russia were quite strong already before 1914, as many saw a common goal: building a national homeland for all Romanians. There were many divergent visions on how this could be achieved: some wanted all lands inhabited by Romanians to be reunited under the Austrian crown, others wanted an independent Romanian state, which might be closer either to the Central powers or to the Entente. At the time, less than half of all Romanians lived within the borders of what was then the Kingdom of Romania, and due to its small size, it had almost no influence over the two big neighboring empires. As a result, the Romanian intelligentsia in Transylvania, Bukovina and Bessarabia had to seek political empowerment by itself, exchanging methods and tactics with each other. Transylvanian newspapers in Romanian, such as Ardealul of Onisifor Ghibu were widespread in Bessarabia before World War I, where local newspapers such as Cuvânt moldovenesc and Viața Basarabiei, although not completely outlawed, were targets of Russian authorities. With the overall recruitment for World War I, many representatives of Romanian intelligentsia found themselves as low-rank officers in Austrian and Russian armies.

In 1917, after the February Revolution in Petrograd, "Moldavian Revolutionary Committees of Soldiers" were organized in the major Russian cities where recruits from Bessarabia were concentrated: Odessa, Kiev, Sevastopol, Kherson, Novogeorgievsk, Moroski (Minsk gubernia) in Russia, as well as in Iași, Roman, and Bârlad on the Romanian Front, plus smaller ones. Among the main calls on their banners were "Land and liberty", "Down with the war", and "Peoples's right to self-determination". April 1917 was the month with most such gatherings in the Russian Empire. On 2 May [O.S. 19 April] 1917, a huge meeting was held in Odessa, where more than 10,000 Bessarabian soldiers participated. The resolution adopted by the meeting demanded (a) political autonomy for Bessarabia, (b) organization in Bessarabia of Moldavian military units (cohorts) in order to stop the violence to the population produced by the deserting irregulars of the partially disintegrating Russian Army, news of which had reached the soldiers, making them feel very worried for the fate of their families. This "congress" was also attended by a number of Bessarabian students, who obtained from the Russian authorities the permission to hold for those interested Romanian history and literature courses at the University of Odessa, as well as a number of Bessarabian intellectuals, such as Emanoil Catelli, Baluță, and others, who were most probably the authors of the resolution passed.

=== Local congresses ===
Following the February Revolution and the cessation of World War I hostilities, various meetings and congresses were organized throughout Bessarabia, discussing the future of the country. Led by teachers and intellectuals, meetings were held and committees were set up in virtually every village, after which county-wide and Bessarabia-wide congresses of professional corporations – peasants, teachers, cooperators, clergy – were held. On April 19 [O.S. April 6]–20 April [O.S. 7 April] 1917, a congress of the representatives of the village cooperatives ("The First Congress of Cooperatives of Bessarabia") was held in Chișinău and voted a motion demanding political, administrative, educational, religious, and economic autonomy for Bessarabia and the formation of a legislative assembly "Sfatul Țării" (literally The Council of the Country).

This was followed by other congresses, including those of soldiers, priests, students and teachers, all demanding self-rule. On May 2 [O.S. April 19]–5 May [O.S. 22 April] 1917, 1917, a Congress of Clergy and representatives of parish committees was held in Chişinău, demanding a Moldavian archbishop to head the Church in Bessarabia, political autonomy of Bessarabia, and the setting of a High Council as a national legislative and executive body. Similar motions were passed in all nine counties of Bessarabia.

A "General Congress of Bessarabian Teachers" was held in Chișinău, and passed a motion to switch the primary language used in teaching from Russian to Romanian, to use the Latin alphabet, and supporting the demands of the other three congresses. On June 7 [O.S. May 25]–10 June [O.S. 28 May] 1917, the Congress of Moldavian Teachers decided to switch to the Latin alphabet. Among the notable speeches at that congress were the ones given by Alexei Mateevici, who asked that Bessarabians identify as "Romanians" rather than "Moldavians", and of Iulie Frățiman, who asked that the areas beyond the Dniester inhabited by Romanians be administered by Bessarabia. These opinions weren't unanimous, as several protested being called "Romanians", affirming they were "not Romanian", but "Moldavian".

During April, May and June 1917, a series of Peasant Congresses were held at local levels, demanding land, administrative, and social reform, and the autonomy of Bessarabia. On October 14 [O.S. October 1]–15 October [O.S. 2 October] 1917, the First General Congress of Peasants of All Bessarabia took place in Chișinău. The Congress claimed that from the report of all the regions of Bessarabia, the land was taken over by an anarchic and public disorder current, which the Kerensky administration could not control. The Congress decided to found a Provisional Council of 100 members, 70 of which were Moldavians and 30 were representatives of minority groups. To this end, the Congress made up an organization commission, but little came of it.

=== Legal situation ===
When the February Revolution took place in Petrograd in 1917, the governor of Bessarabia stepped down and passed his legal powers to Constantin Mimi, the President of the Gubernial Zemstvo, who was named the Commissar of the Provisional Government in Bessarabia, with Vladimir Criste his deputy. Similar procedures took place in all regions of the Russian Empire; the chiefs of the Tsarist administrations passed their legal powers to the chiefs of the County and Governorate Zemstvos, which were then called County/Governorate Commissars.

=== Security situation ===
Officers started to disband their troops, and soldiers tried to form groups of people from the same regions to return home. The sheer number of soldiers retreating put a strain on resources along their path home. As a consequence, on May 30 [O.S. May 17], general Dmitriy Shcherbachov, the Supreme Commander of the Russian Armies on the Romanian Front, by order 156370 agreed to form 16 cohorts exclusively of Moldavian soldiers, and commanded by Moldavian officers. He distributed them to all nine counties of Bessarabia.

=== Central Soldiers' Committee ===
On June 22, 1917, delegates of the Moldavian soldiers from all Russian Fronts and major reserve units formed a "Moldavian Central Soldiers' Committee for All of Bessarabia", with headquarters in Chişinău. On July 29 [O.S. July 16], the representatives of Moldavian soldiers in the Russian Army units located on the Romanian Front gathered in Iaşi, and proposed a commission of jurists in Chişinău who would create a Declaration of national and territorial autonomy of Bessarabia, while respecting the rights of ethnic minorities of Bessarabia. On 29 July [O.S. 16 July] 1917, the Moldavian soldiers' central committee in Chișinău called for the creation of a council of the province, which would create a Proposed Law for National and Territorial Autonomy. On 17 September [O.S. 4 September] 1917, the same committee started its own newspaper, called Soldatul român and edited by Iorgu Tudor.

At the suggestion of P. Varzar, P. Harea, and lieutenant Gherman Pântea, leaders of the Central Soldiers Committee, the meeting set up elections for a provincial assembly, Sfatul Țării. Organizing elections was difficult due to the security situation, and because most able-bodied men between 19 and 48 were recruited into the Russian army, and stationed on the Romanian front (which saw action until December 1917), in Odessa and other Black Sea ports.

=== National Moldavian Party ===
Prior to 1917, Bessarabian intelligentsia was divided between noblemen, conservatives, democrats, and socialists. Vasile Stroescu, a rich boyar, managed to persuade all major factions to leave their internal fights and join. In April 1917, the National Moldavian Party was created, headed by Vasile Stroescu, having among its members Paul Gore (a renowned conservative), Vladimir Herța, Pan Halippa (a renowned socialist), Onisifor Ghibu, Daniel Ciugureanu, Ion Pelivan. The party, which demanded autonomy, had a newspaper called Cuvânt moldovenesc, to which some refugees from Bukovina and Transylvania also contributed. The cornerstone of the Moldavian National Party program was to obtain political, administrative, church, school, and economic autonomy for Bessarabia. They did not hesitate to send members of the respective professions to the various congresses held in Bessarabia throughout 1917, and became very influential.

Ghibu and George Tofan were part of a group of Transylvanian and Bukovinian intellectuals which arrived in Bessarabia in the wake of the February Revolution to help organize schools in Romanian, to print books and newspapers, and to help the Bessarabians reorganize political and cultural life. Intellectuals from Bukovina, Transylvania, and the Romanian Old Kingdom fleeing the war to Bessarabia, helped with the printing of Cuvânt moldovenesc, started various language, history, culture, and sciences courses, and set up a People's University (Romanian: Universitatea Populară) in Chişinău.

=== Relationship with Ukraine ===
In the meantime, the Ukrainian National Assembly in Kiev claimed Bessarabia as part of Ukraine, and in response, the Moldavians asked for protection from the Petrograd provisional government. On 20 July [O.S. 7 July] 1917, Constantin Mimi, the official Commissar of the Russian Provisional Government (of Alexander Kerensky) in Chişinău, gathered delegates of all major political, national, professional and administrative organizations to a "delegation" to protest and reject the pretensions of the Ukrainian Central Rada to annex Bessarabia. Protest notes were sent to the Government in Petrograd and to the Ukrainian Rada in Kyiv. The "delegation" also elected a commission tasked with elaboration of an organic statute of the new political and administrative order in Bessarabia. (Halipa, Moraru, pag 144, Nistor, p. 275)

On the same day, similar decisions were taken by the Central Moldavian Soldiers Committee of All Bessarabia (Chişinău), and the Committee of Moldavian Soldiers in the Odessa Garrison, which had 19,000 Moldavian soldiers and officers, and the Rumcherod protested to Kerensky. A revolutionary organization, Rumcherod, was created in Odessa, being a representative body of the Russian Army on the Romanian front, and having many Moldavians in its ranks. On 2 August [O.S. 20 July] 1917, the Rumcherod protested against the Ukrainian claims, and demanded from the provisional government the right "to rule themselves within the historical and ethnic boundaries". The Central Soldiers Committee in Chișinău and Rumcherod both asked the Petrograd Government to separate Bessarabia from Russia by agreeing to its autonomy and self-rule in its historic and ethnographic borders. Facing a unanimous protest of Bessarabians, the Ukrainian Rada withdrew its stance on Bessarabia.

=== Elections ===
On 10 September [O.S. 28 August] 1917, the Moldavian Central Soldiers Committee of All Bessarabia asked the Supreme Commander, General Sherbachov, to withdraw all Russian Military reserve units from Bessarabia and to increase the number of cohorts from 16 to 50, plus 20 cavalry cohorts, in view of the multiplication of the gangs of Russian deserters.

On November 5 [O.S. October 23]–9 November [O.S. 27 October] 1917, the Soldiers' council proclaimed the autonomy of Bessarabia, and summoned for the election of a representative body (diet), called Sfatul Țării. The soldiers' councils elected 44 deputies for the assembly, the Peasants' Congress elected 36 deputies, and the remaining 70 deputies were elected by county and communal commissions, as well as by professional and ethnic associations. 70% of the members were Romanians, and the rest were Russians, Bulgarians, Jews, etc.

The Moldavian Central Soldiers and Officers Committee of All Bessarabia called the First Soldiers Congress in Chişinău on November 2 [O.S. October 20]–9 November [O.S. 27 October] 1917. 9,000 delegates came to represent the 300,000 Bessarabian soldiers in the Russian Army. The delegates had to come with written delegations from their military units, which were then checked. During the first day, the main theme was the disaster in the security situation in Bessarabia, which was full of gangs practicing pillage, robbery, rapes and killings of the population. At first, these were isolated gangs, but by October, whole regiments turned into such gangs. Two Cossack regiments were stationed in Bălți County, and a 3,000-strong Russian Army regiment in Orhei County had no other occupation but regular raids through these Counties. Among their victims were preeminent personalities, such as the lawyer Simeon G. Murafa, the engineer Hodorogea, and Mihai Razu in August 1917. On 3 November [O.S. 21 October] 1917, the Congress, "based on historic, national and revolutionary" considerations, proclaimed Bessarabia territorially and politically an "Autonomous Republic". On 23 October, the Congress discussed the administrative question, and proclaimed the setting of the parliament Sfatul Țării, composed of 120 delegates, 84 of which should be Moldavians, and 36 ethnic minorities, which should assume the national sovereignty. The Congress demanded that with the setting of Sfatul Țării, all political committees, except for the professional ones, to be dismantled. The number of members of Sfatul Țării was later raised to 135, and then to 150, preserving the 70%:30% ratio of Moldavians:minorities. An organization bureau (birou de organizațiune) was elected to implement this decision. 44 delegates were to be elected by the Soldiers Congress, 36 by the Peasants Congress and its County representations, and the remainder by county and local commissions, different professional corporations, associations of the clergy, of the teachers, of the bar, of public functionaries, of workers, so that all the ethnic groups be duly represented.

=== Transition of power ===
The Peasants Congress, which took place in October 1917, voted Mimi out and Ion Inculeţ as the new Commissar. This move was planned by Alexander Kerensky, who sent Inculeț, an associate professor at the University of Petrograd, to Bessarabia to take hold of the situation. When Inculeț arrived in Chișinău to take power, he faced the quiet opposition of the nobility, and he agreed to take the position of deputy commissar in favor of Vladimir Criste. When the republic was proclaimed, Criste stepped down and passed his legal powers to Inculeț.

== The workings of the Diet ==
=== Opening ===
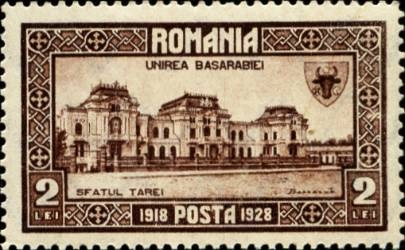
Sfatul Țării Palace

On 4 December [O.S. 21 November] 1917, after a month of elections by different political and professional organizations of their delegates, Sfatul Țării opened as the first parliament of the autonomous Bessarabia, with the local legal representatives of the Russian Provisional Government signing off their duties to Sfatul Țării.

A festive mass was held at the Chișinău Central Cathedral, with Bishop Anastasii, a Russian cleric, holding the mass in Romanian.

After the mass in the cathedral, at noon the delegates gathered at the Sfatul Țării Palace, where a Moldavian tricolor flag flew. Before the session, in the chapel of the palace, a te Deum was held by the vicar of the Eparchy of Bessarabia and Bishop of Cetatea Albă, Gavriil, also a Russian, and again to everyone's surprise, it was held in Romanian, ending with a congratulation to Bessarabia for the autonomy a blessing to Sfatul Țării. The delegates moved to the session hall, where a few soldiers presented the flag of the 1st Moldavian Regiment. Bishop Gavriil blessed the flag and the church chorus, led by the priest Berezovski song "Deșteaptă-te, române!" and "Pe-al nostru steag e scris Unire". After this, the assistance, moved to the balcony to watch the march of the 1st Moldavian Regiment and of several other troops which came to salute the opening of Sfatul Țării.

At 2 pm, the delegates and the public took their places and the session started. In the front of the hall, the elder of the delegates, Nicolae N. Alexandri took the place of the president of the session. In front of him, the delegates took their places. To the right, places were reserved for the public, and to the left for the press. The first session of Sfatul Țării was held on 4 December [O.S. 21 November] 1917, and chose Ion Inculeț as its president.

=== Relations with Petrograd ===
Trying to normalize the relationship with the now Bolshevik government, a Sfatul Țării delegation visited Vladimir Lenin in Petrograd, explaining to him "the hard-hit fate of the people of Bessarabia, which is of Latin root, under the tsarist rule, when the centuries old traditions and customs, which are different from those of the Russian people, were being attacked, hit, and forbidden, and explained him the stage of the organization of Bessarabia." Lenin is said to have replied that he was aware of the situation in Bessarabia, and was satisfied that the people managed to elect a parliament in an orderly fashion based on democratic principles. He said "Do not waste your time here in Petrograd, go to Bessarabia and organize yourselves. You have all the right to self-determination, do everything that you consider is in the interest of the people, that is of the peasants".

=== Moldavian Democratic Republic ===
Flag of Democratic Republic of Moldavia

After some long talks, on 15 December [O.S. 2 December] 1917, Sfatul Țării proclaimed the Moldavian Democratic Federative Republic (Romanian: Republica Democrată Federativă Moldovenească), with Inculeț as president.

Following the October Revolution, the governor of Bessarabia retired, yielding power to Constantin Mimi, the president of the Zemstvo of the guberniya, who was named Guberniya Commissar in March. The Peasants' Congress in October replaced Mimi with Inculeț, an action planned and approved by Kerensky, Russia's interim prime minister. As soon as the Peasants Congress, which had no legal power, voted, Kerensky formally replaced Mimi with Inculeț. When Inculeț arrived in Chișinău to take power, he faced the quiet opposition of the nobility, therefore he agreed to take the position of deputy commissar to Vladimir Criste. When the republic was proclaimed, Criste stepped down and passed his legal powers to Inculeț.

The aims put forward by Sfatul Țării in its session on 15 December [O.S. 2 December] 1917 were:

1. to call as soon as possible the People Assembly of the Moldavian Democratic Republic, which should be elected in a general suffrage according to the highest democratic principles, and until such time Sfatul Țării to take the full responsibility for the political power and legislation,
2. to divide the land to the working people and to make up a law for land reform, while the forests, the waters, the underground, the research fields, the hotbeds, sugar beet plantations, boyar, monastery, church, and state grape-yards and orchards would pass under the administration of regional committees of the Moldavian Democratic Republic,
3. to fulfill the people's need for basic food and stuff products, to regulate working conditions, where a rise in salary and an 8-hour workday should be provided for,
4. to make up a plan to de-mobilize the Russian army, and increase employment in factories in order to eliminate the danger of famine,
5. to organize correct elections for local administration,
6. to defend the freedoms earned in the revolution,
7. to abolish the death penalty,
8. to make a law to protect fully the rights of all peoples that live in the Moldavian Democratic Republic,
9. to organize education on the basis of autonomy and nationalization, for all the peoples of the Moldavian Democratic Republic,
10. to organize the formation of Moldavian regiments for defending the riches of the country, for demobilizing the troops of the Romanian front, and for defending the motherland from the most terrible of dangers - anarchy,
11. to ask the Moldavians and the brotherly peoples of the Republic to do the public works, building the new life on the basis of freedom, righteousness and fraternity.

Executive power was given to the Council of Directors led by Pantelimon Erhan. On 21 December [O.S. 8 December] 1917, Sfatul Țării elected the government of the Moldavian Democratic Republic – the Council of Directors General, with nine members, seven Moldavians, one Ukrainian, and one Jew.

=== Deteriorating security situation ===
The Revolution brought chaos in Russia, and some detachments of Bolshevik soldiers were reported to be wreaking havoc in Bessarabia. The Council of Directors sent a mission to Iași (the temporary capital of Romania) to ask the Entente for military help against the Bolsheviks. The Entente sent some Serbian and Czechoslovak troops to no avail, but some squads of Romanian Transylvanians and Bukovinians, organized in Kiev, were sent to Bessarabia, and they resisted the Bolsheviks at the Chișinău train station.

The hardest work for the new Republic was the pressing need for organization of the armed forces. Unfortunately, Major Teodor Cojocaru soon became ill and was hospitalized. Lieutenant Gherman Pîntea was named Director General for Armed Forces. Pîntea managed to organize several well disciplined Moldavian military units led by qualified Bessarabian officers.

In Tighina, Captain Cașcarev (a.k.a. Cașu) formed an artillery squadron, and in addition the Kherson Drujina, formed entirely of Moldavian soldiers, destined for rear front missions, was nationalized. In Băliț, Drujina no. 478, also composed only of Moldavians, and led by Captain Anatolie Popa, was nationalized. A commission of military medics was formed and was attached to the 1st Moldavian Regiment. The Jewish community in Chișinău demanded and obtained the creation of a Jewish company in the same regiment. By 7 January 1918 [O.S. 25 December 1917], when a military march was held in front of the President of the Republic, there were already two cavalry and one infantry regiments, several artillery batteries, and 16 special cohorts. The units received banners, "sanctified" by priests.

However, the Ilie Catărău incident tarnished the reputation of the efficiency of Moldavian units. Ilie Catărău, a private in the Russian Army, joined the new Moldavian military units. His credentials could not be verified, as no-one at that time in Chișinău has met him in any former military unit of the Tsar, but he spoke clean Romanian, said he was from a Bessarabian village, and said he had long suffered under the Tsarist regime, and he was entrusted with responsibility. As soon as he got a small position, Catărău began to abuse his power. He started to send groups of soldiers to pillage neighboring villages and bring to Chişinău oxen, cows, horses, cattle carts, taken from the boyars and peasants. These were brought to the court of the Theological Seminary in Chișinău, where Catărău waited for their peasant owners to show up, and for payment would order to free the cattle, thus making thousands of rubles. Several times, he even entered with a dozen armed men the session hall of Sfatul Țării. As a result of numerous complains from the peasants and the MPs, on 13 January 1918 [O.S. 31 December 1917], Catărău was arrested, and sent to Odessa. However, Catărău's calls to "take everything", especially when applied to alcoholic drinks, found support among soldiers.

At the same time, a number of former functionaries who were left without political power by what they regarded as filthy peasants, started to undermine the authority of Sfatul Țării, and found associates among political radicals that were spreading demagogy. Where the legal authority was being challenged in the northernmost and southernmost districts by numerous gangs of demobilized Russian soldiers on their way home, Bolshevism found sway with some soldiers. Even in Chișinău the authority was not always effective to realize land reform, to organize administration and justice, or to nationalize education. Therefore, on 21 December [O.S. 8 December] 1917 the session of the Council of Directors General, it was decided to send a delegation to Iași to demand the Romanian government and representatives of Entente military aid against Bolshevik influence in Bessarabia.

The political situation in Iași at the time was also very difficult. Russian armies on the Romanian front often fraternized with the Germans/Austrians, and military discipline was weak. The General Staff of General Dmitry Shcherbachev was threatened by Russian revolutionaries, and had to be protected by Romanian soldiers. The Romanian army had to extend in a short period of time to cover a long portion of the front line previously occupied by Russian soldiers, and had to attend to the disarmament of the Russian soldiers all over. The Romanian government replied that it could not spare any soldiers. The representatives of the Entente decided then to send to Bessarabia one Serbian and one Czechoslovak division, which were being formed in Russia from prisoners of war taken from Austria-Hungary. In Kiev, with the help of the Romanian government, several legions of Bukovinian and Transylvanian volunteers, soldiers and officers, were organized to be sent to Bukovina and possibly Transylvania. The Entente High Command in Romania decided to divert a couple of these to Bessarabia. But as soon as these were ready to move, they were needed at the front, and could not be sent to Bessarabia. Faced with systemic pillage by Russian deserters, some Bessarabian peasants started to flee to Romania.

=== Bolshevik takeover attempt ===
The Bolshevik troops gained ground in Bessarabia, while spreading terror against the bourgeoisie. On 18 January [O.S. 5 January] 1918, they occupied Chișinău, and the members of both Sfatul Țării and the Council of Directors fled, while some of them were arrested and sentenced to death. On the same day, a secret meeting of Sfatul Țării decided to send another delegation to Iași to ask for help from Romania.

=== Intervention of Romanian troops ===
After the Bolshevik forces of the Rumcherod attacked the region of Bessarabia, the Romanian government of Ion I. C. Brătianu decided to intervene, and on 26 January [O.S. 13 January] 1918, the 11th Infantry Division under General Ernest Broșteanu entered Chișinău. After skirmishes in the environs of Bălți (where the defending troops were led by Anatolie Popa) and Chișinău, the pro-Soviet troops retreated to Tighina, and after a battle retreated further beyond the Dniester. The battle of Tighina was one of the two major engagements of the 1918 Bessarabian Campaign. It lasted for five days, between 20 and 25 January, and ended in a Romanian victory, albeit with significant Romanian casualties (141 dead). Romanian troops captured 800 guns.

The second important battle was fought at Vâlcov, between 27 January and 3 February. The actions of Bolshevik warships (including three Donetsk-class gunboats), managed to delay the Romanians for several days, but the ships had to retreat on 3 February due to no longer being able to adjust and correct their aiming, after Romanian artillery destroyed the shore-based Bolshevik artillery observation posts. Later that day, Romanian troops occupied Vâlcov. The Romanians captured the Bolinder-class river gunboat K-2 (255 tons, 2 x 152 mm Canet guns) as well as several more barges armed with a total of eight 152 mm Obuchov guns.

== Independence ==
On 6 February [O.S. 24 January] 1918, Sfatul Țării voted in unanimity for the independence of the Moldavian Democratic Republic. The Directory Council was dissolved, and was replaced by a Ministry Council, led by Daniel Ciugureanu, while the President remained Ion Inculeț.

== Union with Romania ==
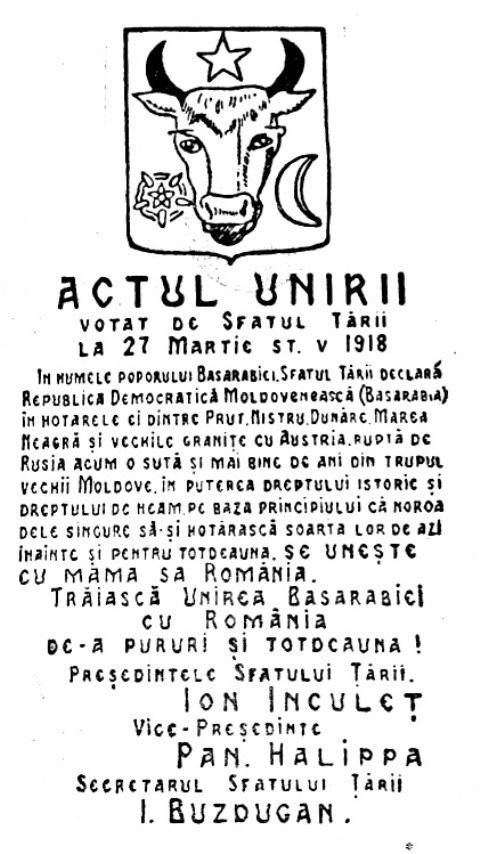
Declaration of unification of Bessarabia and Romania

=== Pro-unionist spirits ===
The county councils of Bălți, Soroca and Orhei were the earliest to ask for the "holy, redeeming, much desired and eternal union with the mother country Romania"

=== Proclamation of the Union ===
On 9 April [O.S. 27 March] 1918, Sfatul Țării voted on Bessarabia's union with Romania. Support for the union was mixed and the vote did not break down along clear ethnic lines: 86 members voted for the union and only 3 against, but 36 representatives abstained and 13 failed to appear.

Two individuals who had been members of the Sfatul Țării at some point were not part of the council during the proclamation of the union. These were Daniel Ciugureanu (member from 4 December 1917 to 29 January 1918) and Ștefan Holban (member from 21 November 1917 to 26 January 1918 and from 25 November 1918 to 27 February 1919).

The Sfatul Țării's declaration listed 14 special privileges that Bessarabia would retain inside an enlarged Romania:

1. Sfatul Țării would undertake an agrarian reform, which would be accepted by the Romanian Government
2. Bessarabia would remain autonomous, with its own diet, Sfatul Țării, elected democratically
3. Sfatul Țării would vote for local budgets, control the councils of zemstvos and cities, and name the local administration
4. conscription would be done on a territorial basis
5. local laws and the form of administration could be changed only with the approval of local representatives
6. the rights of minorities had to be respected
7. two Bessarabian representatives would be part of the Romanian government
8. Bessarabia would send to the Romanian Parliament a number of representatives equal to the proportion of its population
9. all elections must involve a direct, equal, secret, and universal vote
10. freedom of speech and of belief must be guaranteed in the constitution
11. all individuals who had committed felonies for political reasons during the revolution would be amnestied.

The first and main condition of undertaking agrarian reform was debated and approved by the Romanian Parliament in November, 1918. Following this, on November 27, 1918, the leaders of the Moldovan Bloc urged Sfatul Țării to follow suit with Bukovina's Declaration of Union with Romania earlier that day, and vote a motion to remove the other conditions, trusting that Romania would be a democratic country. Although lacking a quorum and voting in the middle of the night, the deputies renounced the other condition, declared the union with Romania unconditional, and voted to dissolve the assembly, with legislative powers to pass to the Romanian Constituent Assembly. Professor of International Affairs Charles King also judges the November 1918 vote on the dissolution of the Diet to be illegitimate, since only 44 of the 125 members took part in it (all 44 voted "for").

In the autumn of 1919, elections for the Romanian Constituent Assembly were held in Bessarabia; 90 deputies and 35 senators were chosen. On December 20, 1919, these men voted, along with the representatives of Romania's other regions, to ratificate the unification acts that had been approved by Sfatul Țării and the National Congresses in Transylvania and Bukovina.

=== Follow-up (1918–1919) ===
In the evening of the April 9, 1918, King Ferdinand I of Romania, issued in Iași the Decree-Law No. 842, published in Monitorul Oficial No. 8, on April 10, 1918, sanctioning the Union of Bessarabia with the Kingdom of Romania, thus making the text of the Union Act as voted by Sfatul Țării, including its conditions, legally binding in Romania. According to documents found by the researcher Mihai Tașcă at the National Archive of the Republic of Moldova, several days after the signing of the Union act, three absent members of Sfatul Țării, Serghei Donico-Iordăchescu, Ion Harbuz, and Gavril Buciușcan, who abstained on the day of the vote, came to sign the copies of the Union act.

On 10 December [O.S. 27 November] 1918, Sfatul Țării, contending that the social and economic conditions stipulated in the Union Act of 27 March/9 April 1918, regarding the universal suffrage, the agrarian reform, and the rights of the people, were being fulfilled by the new Romanian legislation, and taking the act of the Union of Bukovina (28 November [O.S. 15 November] 1918) and of Transylvania (1 December [O.S. 18 November] 1918) with Romania, has decided to "renounce to the other conditions from the Union Act from 9 April [O.S. 27 March] 1918 and declares the Union of Bessarabia with Romania unconditional" from the day preceding the day of the Romanian Constituent Assembly (a body subsequently elected in 1919 after the three 1918 unions, to which these make reference), until which Sfatul Țării would continue to attend to the needs and requests of the people. This act was again sanctioned by the King and made legally binding in Romania. However, the session of Sfatul Țării on 9 December [O.S. 26 November] 1918, where this unanimous decision was taken, was attended only by 44 MPs, raising questions about its legality. Anti-union political forces from inside and outside Romania have used this as a pretext to challenge the union per se, and the Union Act in March/April 1918.

The Union Act of 9 April [O.S. 27 March] 1918 stipulated 11 conditions. The first condition was the agrarian reform, realized by Sfatul Țării after the Union Act, and its legal recognition in the legislative body of Romania. Conditions 4 to 11 regarding human rights and freedoms, minority rights, the representation of Bessarabia in the Romanian legislative and executive, the type of suffrage for general and local elections, the legal continuation and conditions for modifications of the laws and regulations adopted by Sfatul Țării, the reform and organization of the military (recruitment on territorial basis), and the amnesty for crimes committed for political reasons in 1917–1918, were only partially absorbed into the Romanian Constitution and/or legislation. The annulment of the conditions of the Union Act did not have any legal consequences with respect to conditions 1, or 4–11. The 27 November/9 December vote, however, effectively abrogated conditions 2 and 3, which stipulated provincial autonomy, with a diet, an executive body and administration, with the diet having the legal prerogatives (a) to vote the local budgets, (b) to control all the local and city bodies, and with the executive body having the prerogative (c) to nominate all local administration, in the case of higher functionaries with confirmation by the Romanian Government.

The representatives of the German minority abstained from the vote on April 9, with Alexander Loesch declaring that they do not have the empowerment of the German community to vote and that "this question can be answered by the Congress of the German Colonists". The Congress of the German Colonists in Bessarabia took place on March 7, 1919, in Tarutino. The following decision was taken by unanimity of votes:

The war of the peoples of Europe, that everywhere had as consequences fundamental changes, has created something entirely new for Bessarabia as well, where 100 years ago German colonists have founded their motherland.

After already in March 1918 [27 March/9 April 1918], the representatives of the Bessarabian population have expressed their serious desire for union with Romania, the definitive union of Bessarabia with the Kingdom of Romania has been sanctioned by the decree of His Majesty the King [of Romania] on 27 November 1918. Hence, Bessarabia, whose population is composed in majority of Romanians (Moldavians), is united to Romania.

In view of this fact, the Congress of German Colonist from Bessarabia, in its turn declares the union to the Kingdom of Romania, being fully convinced that the German colonists from Bessrabia will live with the Romanian people united under a single scepter, in peace and in good understanding.

A guarantee for this, the German colonists see in the decisions of the Sfatul Țării, which establish that every nation has the right to be ruled, educated, administered, and judged in its own language and by its own sons and to have corresponding representation in the legislative bodies, in the government, representation which guarantees the autonomy of the church and school, as well as the rights of the German colonists. The Bessarabian colonists, as citizens of the Romanian state will always be faithful to the Throne and the State.

The Congress of German Colonists makes this step of serious and of big responsibility with faith in God and asking the Almighty to bless it and to bring everything to a good end.

Challenges to the Union have come from a number of people, from some bodies (e.g. Ukrainian Rada), and from one state (the Soviet Union). However, many of the same people, bodies and state have at other points accepted the Union. In the reply note to a note of protest of the Ukrainian Rada expressing pretensions over Bessarabia, the Romanian government mentioned "1. Bessarabia was not annexed by Romania, as the Ukrainian note states, but has declared

"Union with the Motherland" on the basis of a decision taken by Sfatul Țării, the national assembly of the Moldavian Republic. This assembly emerges from the will of the nation and represents a sovereign power (...) 2. It is an incontestable fact that over the Dniester there is a numerous Romanian population, over which the Romanian Bessarabia, and hence the today Romania, could raise up similar pretensions as Ukraine over the Ruthenians in Bessarabia. 3. With its new pretensions, the Rada has forgotten that on the occasion of the Brest-Litovsk Peace, Ukraine has raised no pretensions over Bessarabia or its people. Ethnically, Bessarabia is a Romanian land, which belonged to the Principality of Moldavia, from its founding in the 14th century until the day when, in 1812, it was ravished by the Tsarist Russia. 4. The Ukrainian government has declared on 19 January 1918 to [the Romanian] general Coandă, which was received in Kiev as representative of Romania, that it does not have any opposition should Bessarabia want to unite with Romania, if this is the will of Bessarabia, and has added that it would bring its support to this union... 5. Hence the Romanian government can not accept the protests of the Rada..."

The Ukrainian bodies have not subsequently challenged the union. An anti-Bessarabian and anti-Romanian campaign was started in 1918–1919 in a part of the western press. A "Committee for the Defence of Bessarabia" was formed in Odessa, by supporters of the White movement such as Alexander Krupenski, Alexander Schmidt and Vladimir Tsyganko, with backing from Mihail Savenco, Mark Slonim, and others. The activity of many of these people had substantial personal baggage – Krupenski was during the Tsarist rule the most influential and powerful person in Bessarabia, Schmidt was mayor of Chișinău, Savenco was the former Minister of Justice of the Moldavian Republic, all of them very unpopular. They have send a memo to the Paris Peace Conference, published several newspaper articles and brochures targeting the French public opinion, portraying the situation in Bessarabia as a Romanian military occupation. Their activity was later supplanted by Bolsheviks, who proclaimed a Bessarabian Soviet Socialist Republic on May 5, 1919, in Odessa.

On the opposite side, supporting Bessarabia, were Nicolai N. Durnovo, writer and publisher, Sergei Witte, former Russian prime-minister, General Kuropatkin, former war minister of Russia, Leon Casso, minister of education of the Russian Empire in 1910–1914, writer Danilevski, journalist Tikhomirov. Sotov, correspondent of the Russian journal Sovremennye zapiski in Berlin (1921), and a declared adversary of the Union of Bessarabia with Romania, nevertheless in his articles with regard to the portrayal of the events and blamed the forced Russification in the Bessarabia's past for the post-1918 situation:

The alienation of the population [of Bessarabia] from Russism has happened quickly, without pain or hinders, because when Romanian authorities came to Bessarabia they have found an environment which understood them and which they understood.

(...) This country, that before the revolution was in the hands of the big landlords from the "black gang", was culturally at an inferior level. The stupid Russification and Anti-Semitism of the autocratic power made that the large masses of the Moldavian and Jewish population be alien from the Russian school, from the Russian book, and in general from all the elements of the Russian culture and the Russian intelligentsia. Hence, what kind of closeness could there be between the Russians and Romanians from Bessarabia? Between the Russian administration in Bessarabia and the popular masses, not only the Moldavian ones, but also those of other nationalities, was a chasm (...) The Russificators have created a situation, that the peasant coming to the city found himself in an unknown black forest. In every Chancellery, the Russian chinovnik had the right to not understand the Romanian language. The courts, the school, the church, the administration were as many institutions of alien language to the peasants. Over that, a savage arbitrareness ruled there (...) A little closer to the Russian culture was the Jewish population. But in the boroughs, in the fairs and in the markets, one could see how the big mass of the Jewish merchants and shopkeepers, which barely spoke Russian or couldn't understand it at all, were speaking perfectly in Moldavian.

(...) The ruling elite of Romania, with the aim of Romanianization, have made concessions, have protected the national cultural rights of the minorities. Do you want school in Old Hebrew, in jargon, in Ukrainian, Polish, Greek, etc? Here you are! The population has used these gifts and hence the alienation of the masses from the Russian culture, from which it was already foreign and not interested in its preserver, is happening fast and without pain – with the passage of the time, so passes the Russia from Bessarabia.

== Members ==
Sfatul Țării members

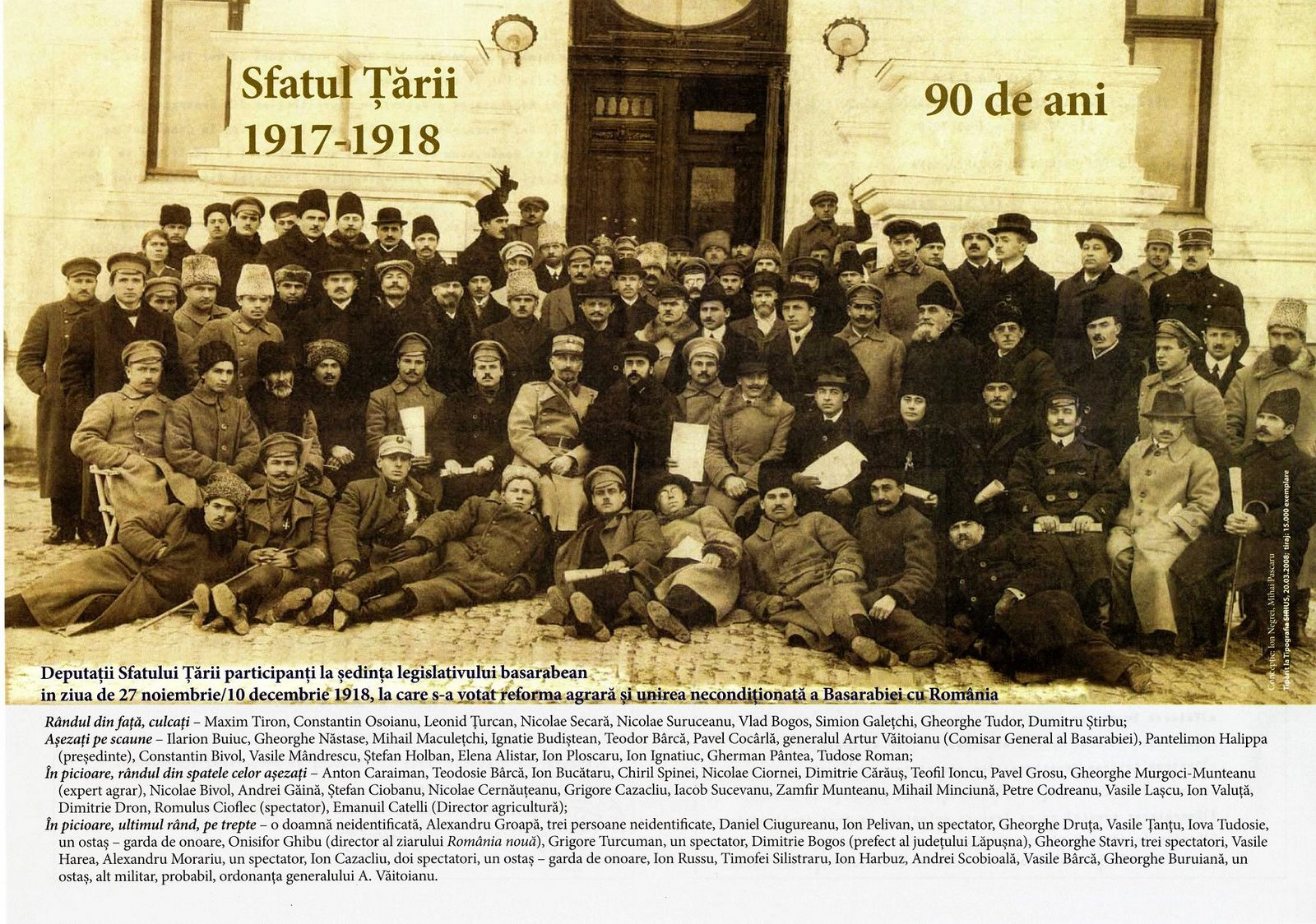
Sfatul Țării members, 10 December 1918

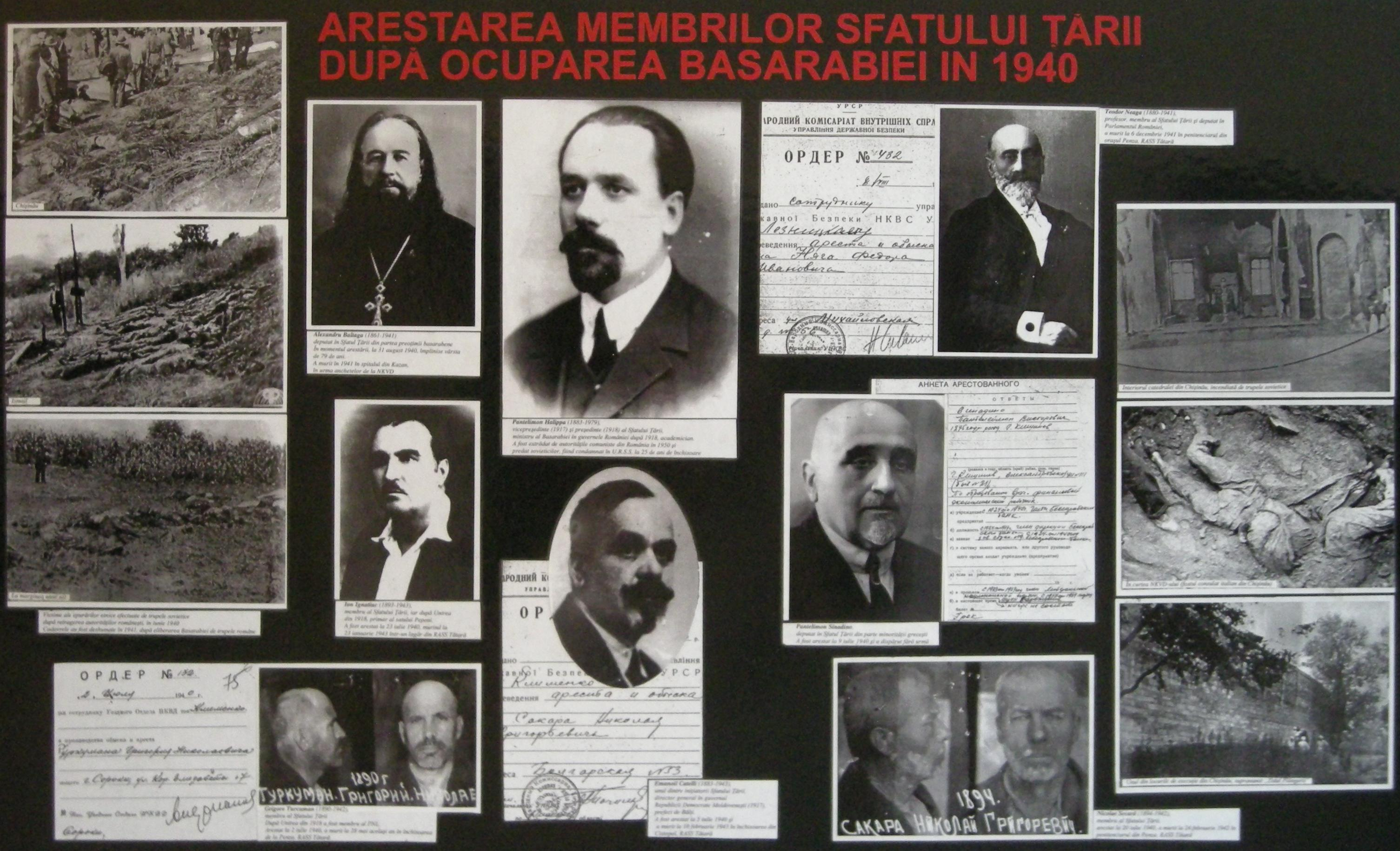
Persecutions against Sfatul Țării members

This Diet was initially planned to have 120 deputies, apportioned as follows: 84 (70%) to the Moldavians (ethnic Romanians), 36 to the minorities. 44 were to be elected by the Congress of Moldavian Soldiers from all Russia, 30 by the peasants, 10 by the Moldavian organizations, 36 by the minorities. This number was later increased to 135, and then 150. These figures were based on estimates of the population of Bessarabia as consisting 70% of Moldavians, and 30% of minorities. The original 135 Diet mandates were divided into 28 constituency groups:

- representatives of the soldiers (38)
- of the Moldavian sailors at Odessa (3)
- Moldavian soldiers at Novo-Georgievsk (1)
- soldiers on the Romanian front (3)
- the Peasants' Soviet (28)
- Central Committee of the National Party (6)
- Romanian Cultural Society in Bessarabia (1)
- Moldavian Professional Association (2)
- Moldavian priests (2)
- Cooperative Union (3)
- Cultural League of Moldavian Women (1)
- Moldavian Students (3)
- Ukrainians (10)
- Germans (2)
- Poles (2)
- Bulgarians and Gagauz (7)
- Greeks and Armenians (2)
- the Zemstvo of Chişinău (2)
- the Press (4)
- the Zemstvo of Soroca (1)
- the City Government of Chișinău (3)
- that of Orhei (1)
- the railroads (3)
- the Israelite Bund (6, one woman)
- the Popular Socialists (1)
- the Social Democrats (1)
- the Judiciary (1), and
- the Bar (1)

The increase to 150 members meant that several were added from the zemstvos and the cities of the various districts, and the government service of mail, telegraphs and telephones. In the final form, of the 150 members, 44 were representatives of the Congress of Moldavian Soldiers; 30 of the Soviet of the Moldavian Peasants; 21 of the administrations of cities and zemstvos; 10 of political parties; 16 of cooperatives, unions, and cultural societies; and 29 of organizations of national minorities.

Of the 150 Diet members, 105 were Moldavians/Romanians, 15 Ukrainians, 13 Jews, 6 Russians, 3 Bulgarians, 2 Germans, 2 Gagauzians, 1 Pole, 1 Armenian, 1 Greek, 1 unknown.

"The various organizations elected their representatives, wherever possible; but the Diet was mainly appointive, and would not be considered a duly representative body in normal times in any western country. It must however be remembered that Bessarabia was in a state of anarchy already, shortly to be complicated by the fall of Kerensky, which left Russia with no responsible government whatever for the moment. He was succeeded by the Bolsheviks-numerically at that time an infinitesimal minority of the Russian people, and not recognized as legitimate rulers by the Bessarabians. The Diet at any rate provided a welcome substitute for constitutional government, and indeed considered itself at the start a transitional body, preliminary to the establishment of a definite regime. The rapid march of events, combined with the ability and determination of several of its members, made of it a genuine governing organ." Voted for the Union on 9 April [O.S. 27 March] 1918 (name, age, profession, ethnic group, county; as available):

=== Voted in favour of the Union ===
1. * Nicolae Alexandri, 60, journalist, Hotin/Chișinău
2. * Elena Alistar-Romanescu, 42, physician, Cetatea Albă/Chișinău
3. * Alexandru Baltaga, 55, priest, Orhei
4. Constantin Bivol, 33, farmer, Chișinău
5. Teodor Bârcă, 24, teacher, Chișinău
6. Teodosie Bârcă, 23, farmer, Soroca
7. Vladimir Bodescu, 50, lawyer, Chișinău
8. Vladimir Bogos, 24, student, Chișinău
9. * Nicolae Bosie-Codreanu, 32, engineer, Hotin
10. * Ștefan Botnarciuc, 43, farmer, Ukrainian, Bălți
11. * Ignatie Budişteanu, 30, farmer, Bălțip
12. * Ilarion Buiuc, 27, farmer, Orhei
13. * Gheorghe Buruiană, 33, cooperative official, Chișinău
14. * Ion Buzdugan, 30, teacher, Orhei/Bălți
15. * Anton Caraiman, 38, farmer, Orhei
16. * Grigore Cazacliu, 26, student, Soroca
17. * Ion Cazacliu, 48, civil service, Soroca
18. Vladimir Cazacliu, 29, student, Soroca
19. * Dimitrie Cărăuș, 25, student, Soroca
20. * Vasile Cerescu (Ciorăscu), 31, farmer, Chișinău
21. * Nicolae Cernăuțeanu, 26, soldier, Hotin
22. Nicolae Cernov, Russian, Tighina
23. * Afanasie Chiriac, 27, farmer, Dubăsari/Tighina
24. * Vladimir Chiorescu, 30, cooperative official, Chișinău
25. * Vasile Cijevschi, 37, army officer, Tighina
26. * Nicolae Ciornei, 25, farmer, Cahul
27. * Pavel Cocârlă, 24, artisan, Orhei
28. * Ion Codreanu, 39, farmer, Soroca
29. * Ion Costin, 35, lawyer, Chișinău
30. * Ion Creangă, 24, teacher, Dubăsari/Tighina
31. * Anton Crihan, 25, student, Bălți
32. * Dumitru Dragomir, 28, farmer, Cetatea Albă
33. Dumitru Dron, 25, student, Orhei/Bălţi
34. Felix Dutkiewicz (Dudchievicz), Polish, Lublin / Chișinău
35. * Boris Epure, 36, civil service, Chișinău/Bălți
36. * Pantelimon Erhan, 34, professor, Tighina
37. * Vasile Gafencu, 30, farmer, Bălți
38. Simion Galețchi, Soroca
39. Andrei Găină, 33, farmer, Orhei
40. Vasile Ghenzul, 35, civil service, Chișinău
41. * Alexandru Groapă, 38, cooperative official, Bălți
42. * Nicolae Grosu, 27, student, Chișinău
43. * Pantelimon Halippa, 34, journalist, Soroca
44. Teodor Herța, Orhei
45. * Ion Ignatiuc, 25, farmer, Bălți/Chișinău
46. * Ion Inculeț, 35, professor, Chișinău
47. * Teofil Ioncu, 32, civil service, Orhei
48. Vasile Lascu, 60, journalist, Chișinău
49. Mihail Maculețchi, 56, farmer, Orhei
50. Dimitru Marchitan, 32, farmer, Bălți
51. * Gheorghe Mare, 36, professor, Cahul/Cetatea Albă
52. Nicolae Mămăligă, 38, gardener, Chișinău
53. Vasile Mândrescu, 29, farmer, Orhei
54. * Dumitru Mârza, 23, teacher, Hotin
55. Mihail Minciună, 32, farmer, Orhei
56. * Alexandru Moraru, 37, farmer, Hotin
57. * Anatolie Moraru, 23, farmer, Hotin
58. * Zamfir Munteanu, Ismail
59. * Gheorghe Năstase, 22, teacher, Soroca
60. * Teodor Neaga, 37, professor, Chișinău
61. * Constantin Osoianu, 32, farmer, Bălți
62. * Efimie Palii, 37, gardener, Soroca
63. * Ion Pascăluță, 25, soldier, Bălți
64. * Gherman Pântea, 24, teacher, Bălți
65. * Ion Pelivan, 40, lawyer, Chişinău/Bălți
66. * Petru Picior-Mare, 30, civil service, Bălți
67. * Chiril Sberea, 27, surveyor, Cahul
68. * Andrei Scobioală, 32, professor, Bălți
69. * Nicolae Secară, 24, professor, Soroca/Chișinău
70. * Timofei Silistaru, 23, army officer, Ismail/Tighina
71. * Elefterie Sinicliu, 22, farmer, Orhei
72. Nicolae Soltuz, 60, farmer, Soroca
73. * Chiril Spinei, 34, farmer, Soroca
74. Gheorghe Stavrii, 35, farmer, Cahul
75. Constantin Stere, 54, professor, Soroca
76. Iacov Sucevan, Chișinău
77. * Nicolae Suruceanu, 28, army officer, Chișinău
78. * Teodor Suruceanu, 52, farmer, Chișinău
79. * Gheorghe Tudor, 33, teacher, Bălți
80. * Ion Tudose, 33, farmer, Orhei/Bălți
81. * Grigore Turcuman, 26, farmer, Soroca
82. * Vasile Țanțu, 35, teacher, Chișinău
83. * Leonida Ţurcan, 23, civil service, Soroca/Chişinău
84. * Teodor Uncu, 34, civil service, Orhei
85. * Ion Valuță, 24, student, Bălți
86. * Vitalie Zubac, 23, army officer, Ismail

=== Voted against the Union ===
1. Ștefan Balmez, 35, civil service, Bulgarian, Chișinău
2. Arcadie Osmolovschi, Ukrainian
3. Mihail Starenki, Ukrainian

=== Refrained from voting ===
1. * Philipp Almendingher, 50, farmer, German, Cetatea Albă
2. * Zaharia Bocșan, 49, farmer, Bălți
3. * Gheorghe Brinici, 30, farmer, Ukrainian, Bălți
4. Gavril Buciușcan, 29, teacher, Orhei
5. * Nichita Budnicenco (Vilnicenco), 36, farmer, Ukrainian, Bălți
6. Vasile Covali, Ukrainian
7. Aleksey Kulava, 43, farmer, Bulgarian, Ismail
8. Petre Culcev, 47, farmer, Bulgarian
9. * Vasile Curdinovschi, 46, professor, Poltava
10. Dragomir Diaconovici
11. Serghei Donico-Iordăchescu, Chișinău
12. * Ion Dumitrașcu, 28, farmer, Orhei
13. Ion Harbuz, 31, civil service, Chișinău
14. Alexandru Greculoff, Russian
15. * Isac Gherman, 60, lawyer, Jewish, Chișinău
16. Andrei Krupenski, Ukrainian, Chișinău
17. * Constantin Iurcu, 34, farmer, Hotin
18. * Eugen Kenigschatz, 58, lawyer, Jewish, Chișinău;
19. Teodor Kirilov, 37, lawyer, Bulgarian, Ismail
20. Ivan Krivorukoff, 42, workman, Russian, Tighina
21. Samuel Lichtmann, 60, civil service, Jewish
22. Alexander von Loesch, German
23. Vladimir Lineff, 39, professor, Russian
24. Petre Manițchi, 35, teacher, Russian
25. Dimitar Maldov, Bulgarian
26. * Krste Misirkov, 43, professor, Bulgarian, Ismail
27. Teodor Moldovan
28. * Iacob Nagorniak, 39, farmer, Ukrainian, Hotin
29. * Teodor Nichitiuc, 35, surveyor, Ukrainian, Cahul
30. Petre Poliatenciuk, 36, civil service, Ukrainian, Podolia
31. Gheorghe Ponomareff, probably Russian
32. Ion Popa, 28, farmer, Bălți
33. Mihail Savenco, Ukrainian
34. Moise Slutski, 62, doctor, Jewish, Chișinău
35. Vladimir Țîganco, 31, engineer, Russian
36. Eftimie Vizitiu, 37, farmer, Soroca

=== Absent from that session ===
1. Bajbeuk-Melicoff, 45, surveyor, Armenian, Orhei
2. Ion Ceornega, 40, farmer, Ismail
3. * Teodor Corobcean, 37, cooperative official, Soroca
4. Ioan Herța, 34, farmer, Chișinău
5. Gutman Landau, 40, civil service, Jewish
6. Anton Novakov, Bulgarian
7. Anton Rugină
8. Kalistrat Savciuc, Ukrainian
9. Gheorghe Sârbu
10. * Teodor Stanevici, 51, judge, Russian, Chișinău
11. Mendel Steinberg, Jewish
12. Gheorghe Tcepciu
13. Alexandru Țurcan, 32, farmer, Soroca

By the session on April 9, 1918, the number of deputies has reduced for various reasons to 138. Marked with an asterisk are the names of those who were in the Diet from the beginning. For the Union with Romania voted 83 Moldavians, 1 Ukrainian, 1 Russian and 1 Pole (total 86), against it voted 2 Ukrainians and 1 Bulgarian (total 3), while the abstained consisted of 11 Moldavians, 8 Ukrainians, 6 Russians, 5 Bulgarians, 4 Jews and 2 Germans (total 36).

== See also ==
- Parliament of the Republic of Moldova

== Gallery ==
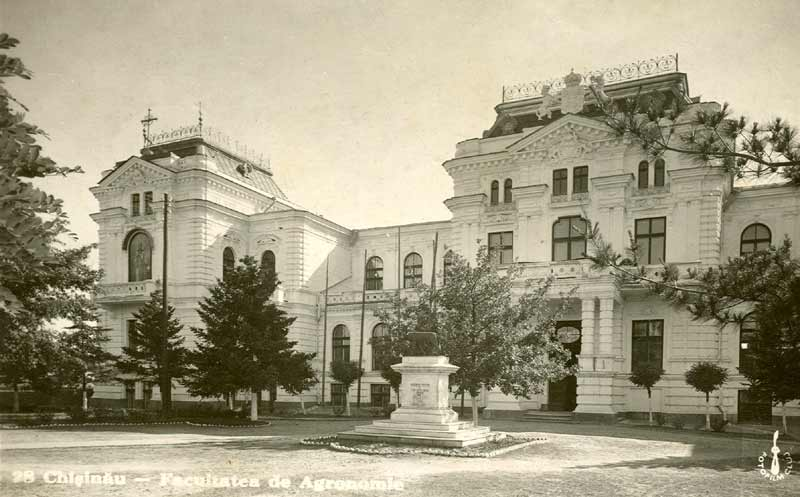
Capitoline Wolf and Sfatul Țării Palace

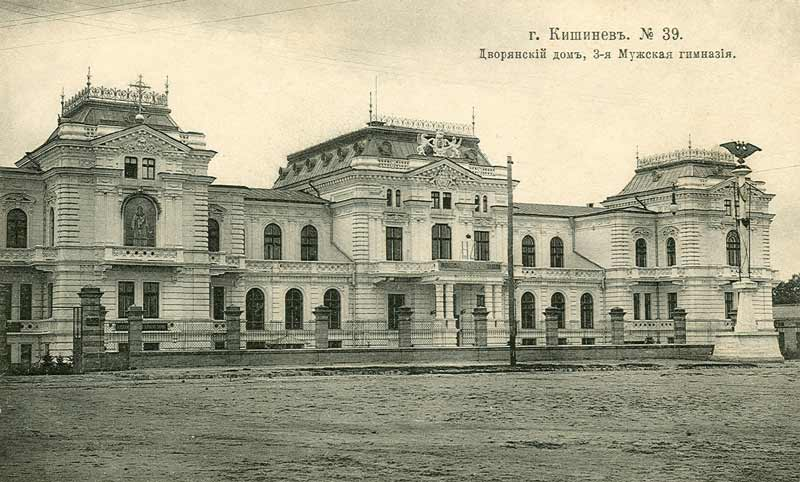
Sfatul Țării Palace

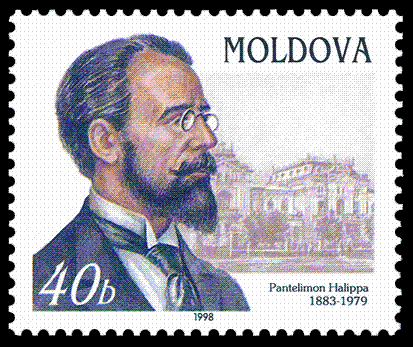
Pan Halippa and Sfatul Țării Palace

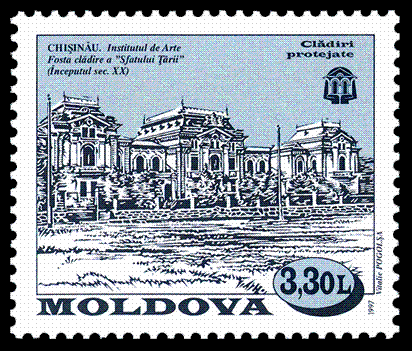
Sfatul Țării Palace
