= Dușmani =

- Village
- Location in Moldova
- Coordinates: 47°43′N 27°29′E
- Country: Moldova
- District: Glodeni District

Population (2014 census)
  - Total: 1,749
- Time zone: UTC+2 (EET)
  - Summer (DST): UTC+3 (EEST)

Dușmani is a village in Glodeni District, northern Moldova.

== History ==
Dusmani was founded by the charter of 1508, by which Bogdan III the One-Eyed gave his servant Dusman a place to found a village.

== Demographics ==
According to the 2014 Moldovan census, Dușmani had a population of 1,749 residents. The village covers an area of 29 square kilometers, resulting in a population density of approximately 60 inhabitants per square kilometer. The population is entirely rural.

In terms of gender distribution, females made up 52.4% of the population, while males accounted for 47.6%. The age structure indicated that 18.5% of residents were under the age of 15, 70.4% were of working age (15–64 years), and 11% were aged 65 or older.

The vast majority of inhabitants (97.9%) were born in Moldova. Small minorities were born in other countries, including 1.4% from the Commonwealth of Independent States and 0.6% from the European Union. Ethnically, the population was predominantly Moldovan, comprising 87.8% of residents. Romanians represented 8.4%, while smaller groups included Romani (2.8%), Ukrainians (0.5%), and Russians (0.5%). In terms of native language, 73.5% of the population spoke Moldovan and 24.6% spoke Romanian. Other reported native languages included Romani (1.4%) and Russian (0.5%).

Religion in Dușmani was overwhelmingly Orthodox Christian, with 99.1% of the population identifying as such. Only 0.9% of residents identified as practicing other religions.

== Education ==
In 2025, the canteen of the Dușmani Gymnasium was renovated as part of Moldova's "European Village" program. The renovation included the replacement of walls, ceilings, windows, and doors, along with upgrades to the water, sewage, heating, and electrical systems. The modernized canteen now provides over 80 primary school students with a hot meal every school day, a significant improvement from the cold snacks previously offered. The project, funded by the Government of Moldova with an investment of 1.85 million lei, reflects ongoing efforts to enhance local educational facilities and the well-being of students.

== Notable people ==
- Petru Picior-Mare
