= Balinți =

Balinți may refer to:

- Balinți, a village in Iarova Commune, Moldova
- Balinți, a village in Havârna Commune, Romania
