= Serghei =

Serghei is a Romanian-language male given name:

- Serghei Alexeev
- Serghei Cleșcenco
- Serghei Covalciuc
- Serghei Covaliov
- Serghei Donico-Iordăchescu
- Serghei Dubrovin
- Serghei Gafina
- Serghei Gheorghiev
- Serghei Lașcencov
- Serghei Marghiev
- Serghei Mariniuc
- Serghei Namașco
- Serghei Nicolau
- Serghei Pașcenco
- Serghei Pogreban
- Serghei Rogaciov
- Serghei Stolearenco
- Serghei Stroenco
- Serghei Țvetcov

and a Romanian surname:

- Larion Serghei
- Valentina Serghei
- Vasile Serghei
