= Epure =

Epure or Iepure is a Romanian surname literally meaning "rabbit". Notable people with the surname include:

- Boris Epure (1882–1938), Moldavian politician
- Traian Epure (1869–?), Romanian military commander

== See also ==
- Ioan Popovici (brigadier general) had nom de guerre Epure
