= Chiperceni =

- Commune
- Chiperceni Road, Chiperceni

- Location in Moldova
- Coordinates: 47°31′N 28°50′E
- Country: Moldova
- District: Orhei District

Population (2014)
  - Total: 2,786
- Time zone: UTC+2 (EET)
  - Summer (DST): UTC+3 (EEST)

Chiperceni is a commune in Orhei District, Moldova. It is composed of three villages: Andreevca, Chiperceni and Voroteț.

== Notable people ==
- Ilarion Buiuc
