= Chițcani (disambiguation) =

Chițcani may refer to several places in Moldova:

- Chițcani, a commune in Căușeni district
- Chițcanii Vechi, a commune in Telenești district, and its village of Chițcanii Noi

and to several places in Romania:

- Chițcani, a village in Costești Commune, Vaslui County
- Chițcani, a village in Boghești Commune, Vrancea County
