= Slobozia Mare =

- Village
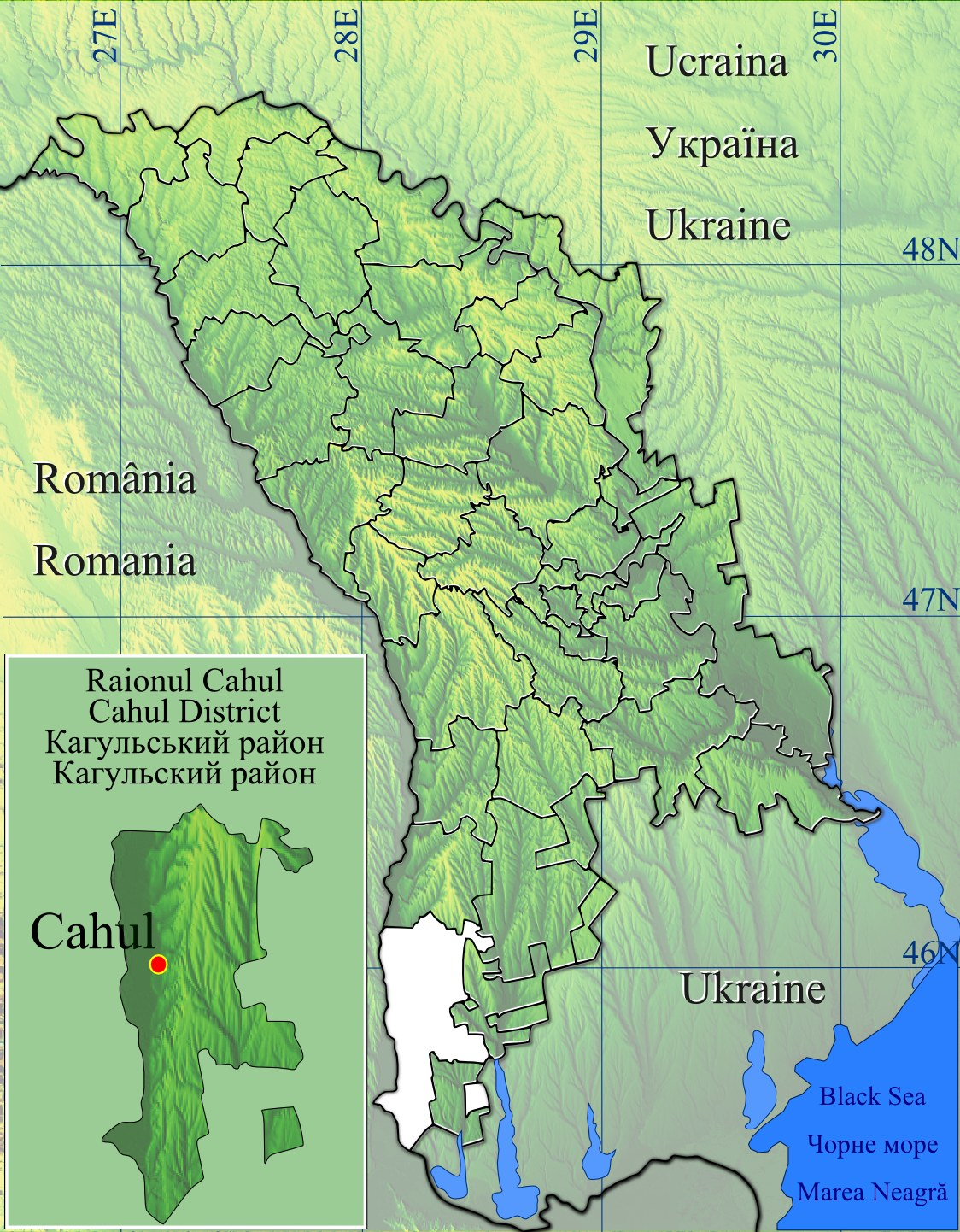
- Location of village within Moldova
- Coordinates: 45°34′N 28°10′E
- Country: Moldova
- District: Cahul District
- Elevation: 148 ft (45 m)

Population (2014 census)
  - Total: 5,676
- Time zone: UTC+2 (EET)
  - Summer (DST): UTC+3 (EEST)

Slobozia Mare is a village in Cahul District, Moldova.

== Notable people ==
- Gheorghe Mare
- Eugeniu Grebenicov

== Bibliography ==
- Vasile Plăcintă, Slobozia Mare, prin fereastra istoriei, Galați : Geneze, [1996] ISBN 973-97667-4-9
