= Mihail Maculețchi =

Bessarabian politician

Mihail Maculeţchi

Member of the Moldovan Parliament
- In office 1917–1918

Personal details
- Born: 1861 Orhei
- Died: Unknown

Mihail Maculeţchi (born 1861, Orhei) was a Bessarabian politician.

== Biography ==
He served as Member of the Moldovan Parliament (1917–1918).

== Gallery ==
Moldovan stamp, 1998
