= Ștefan Botnarciuc =

Moldovan politician

Ştefan Botnarciuc

Member of the Moldovan Parliament
- In office 1917–1918

Ştefan Botnarciuc (1875 in Bălți, Russian Empire – in 1900s) was a Bessarabian politician and a Ukrainian national farmer from Bălţi.

== Biography ==
He served as Member of the Moldovan Parliament (1917–1918). On 27 March 1918 Ştefan Botnarciuc voted for the Union of Bessarabia with Romania.

== Gallery ==
Moldovan stamp, 1998

== Bibliography ==
- Gheorghe E. Cojocaru, Sfatul Țării: itinerar, Civitas, Chişinău, 1998, ISBN 9975-936-20-2
- Mihai Taşcă, Sfatul Țării şi actualele autorităţi locale, "Timpul de dimineaţă", no. 114 (849), June 27, 2008 (page 16)
