= Anton Caraiman =

Bessarabian politician

Anton Caraiman (Caraman)

Member of the Moldovan Parliament
- In office 1917–1918

Personal details
- Born: 1879 Izvoare, Orhei, Pohrebeni
- Died: Unknown

Anton Caraiman (Caraman) (1879, Izvoare, Pohrebeni, Orhei, Bessarabia – after 1918) was a peasant and Bessarabian politician.

== Biography ==
He served as a member of the Moldovan Parliament (1917–1918). On 27 March 1918 Anton Caraiman voted for the Union of Bessarabia with Romania.

== Gallery ==
Moldovan stamp, 1998
