= Mihail Savenco =

Moldovan politician

Member of the Moldovan Parliament
- In office 1917–1918

Director General for Justice
- In office 1917–1918
- President: Ion Inculeţ
- Prime Minister: Pantelimon Erhan

Personal details
- Profession: Jurist

Mihail Savenco (Russian: Михаи́л Саве́нко; Ukrainian: Михайло Савенко) was a Moldovan politician of Ukrainian descent. He was a high-ranking official of the Moldavian Democratic Republic.

== Biography ==
He served as Director General for Justice in Pantelimon Erhan Cabinet and Daniel Ciugureanu cabinet. Also he served as member of the Parliament of Moldova (1917-1918).

He opposed the union of Bessarabia with Romania. Savenco joined a self-appointed team of politicians and landowners who claimed to speak for Bessarabia, and attended the Paris Peace Conference to lobby for the Russian cause. Among the other members of this body were Alexander N. Krupensky, Alexandr K. Schmidt, Vladimir Tsyganko, and Mark Slonim. Their activity was opposed by Bessarabian unionists, such as Ion Inculeț or Ion Pelivan.

== Bibliography ==
- Enciclopedia Chişinău. – Ch., 1997. – 156 p.
- *** - Enciclopedia sovietică moldovenească (Chișinău, 1970–1977)
