= Iarova =

Commune in Soroca District, Moldova

- Commune
- Location in Moldova
- Coordinates: 48°19′N 28°03′E
- Country: Moldova
- District: Soroca District
- Elevation: 272 ft (83 m)

Population (2014)
  - Total: 770
- Time zone: UTC+2 (EET)
  - Summer (DST): UTC+3 (EEST)
- Postal code: MD-3025
- Area code: +373 230

Iarova is a commune in Soroca District, Moldova. It is composed of three villages: Balinți, Balinții Noi and Iarova. A census in 2004 found approximately 770 residents.

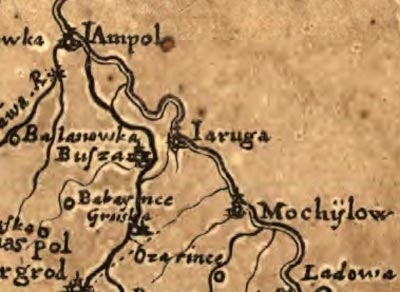
Iarova on Beauplan's 1648 map. South is up, north down.

== Notable people ==
- Efimie Palii
