= Dimitru Marchitan =

Bessarabian politician

Member of the Moldovan Parliament
- In office 1917–1918

Personal details
- Born: 1885
- Died: Unknown

Dimitru Marchitan (born 1885) was a Bessarabian politician.

== Biography ==
He served as Member of the Moldovan Parliament (1917–1918).

== Gallery ==
Moldovan stamp, 1998
