= Dimitrie Cărăuș =

Moldavian politician

Dimitrie Cărăuş

Member of the Moldovan Parliament
- In office 1917–1918

Dimitrie Cărăuş (born 14 April 1892, Sevirova, Soroca county - 1955) student, member of the Sfatul Țării.

== Biography ==
He served as Member of the Moldovan Parliament (1917–1918). On 27 March 1918, when he was a student, Dimitrie Cărăuş voted for the Union of Bessarabia with Romania.

== Family ==
He was married and had a daughter who died in infancy.

== Gallery ==
Moldovan stamp, 1998
