= Vasile Lașcu =

Bessarabian politician (born 1857)

Vasile Laşcu

Member of the Moldovan Parliament
- In office 1917–1918

Personal details
- Born: 1857 Chişinău
- Died: Unknown

Vasile Laşcu (born Chişinău, 1857) was a Bessarabian politician.

== Political career ==
He served as Member of the Moldovan Parliament (1917–1918).

== Gallery ==
Moldovan stamp, 1998

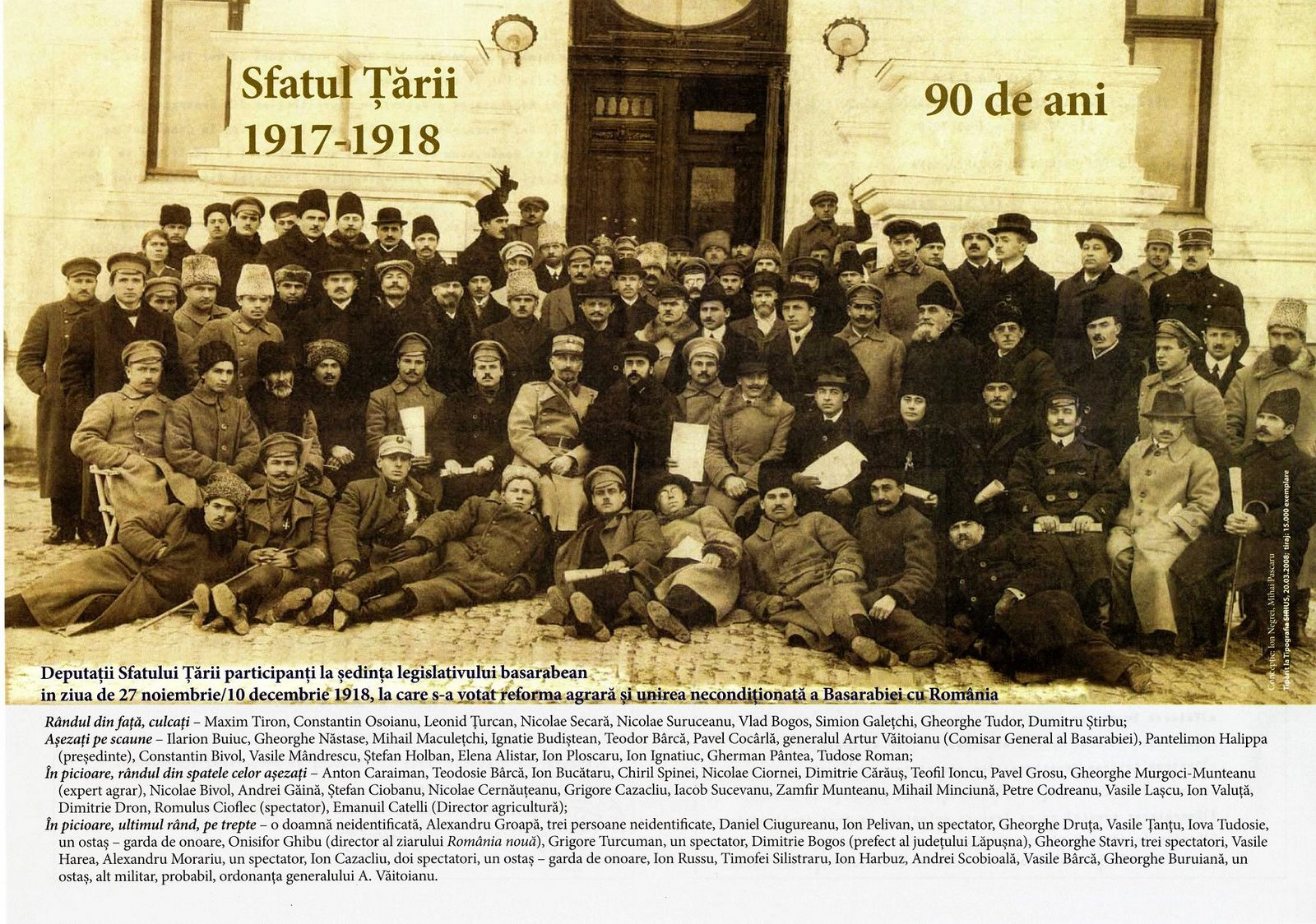
Sfatul Țării Palace, 10 December 1918

== Bibliography ==
- Alexandru Chiriac. Membrii Sfatului Ţării. 1917–1918. Dicţionar, Editura Fundaţiei Culturale Române, București, 2001.
