= Chiril Spinei =

Bessarabian politician

Member of the Moldovan Parliament
- In office 1917–1918

Personal details
- Born: Tătărăuca Veche, Russian Empire

Chiril Spinei was a Bessarabian politician.

== Biography ==
He served as Member of the Moldovan Parliament (1917–1918).
