= Zamfir Munteanu =

Bessarabian politician

Member of the Moldovan Parliament
- In office 1917 – 27 November 1918

Zamfir Munteanu was a Bessarabian politician.

He served as Member of the Moldovan Parliament (1917–1918).

== Gallery ==
Moldovan stamp, 1998

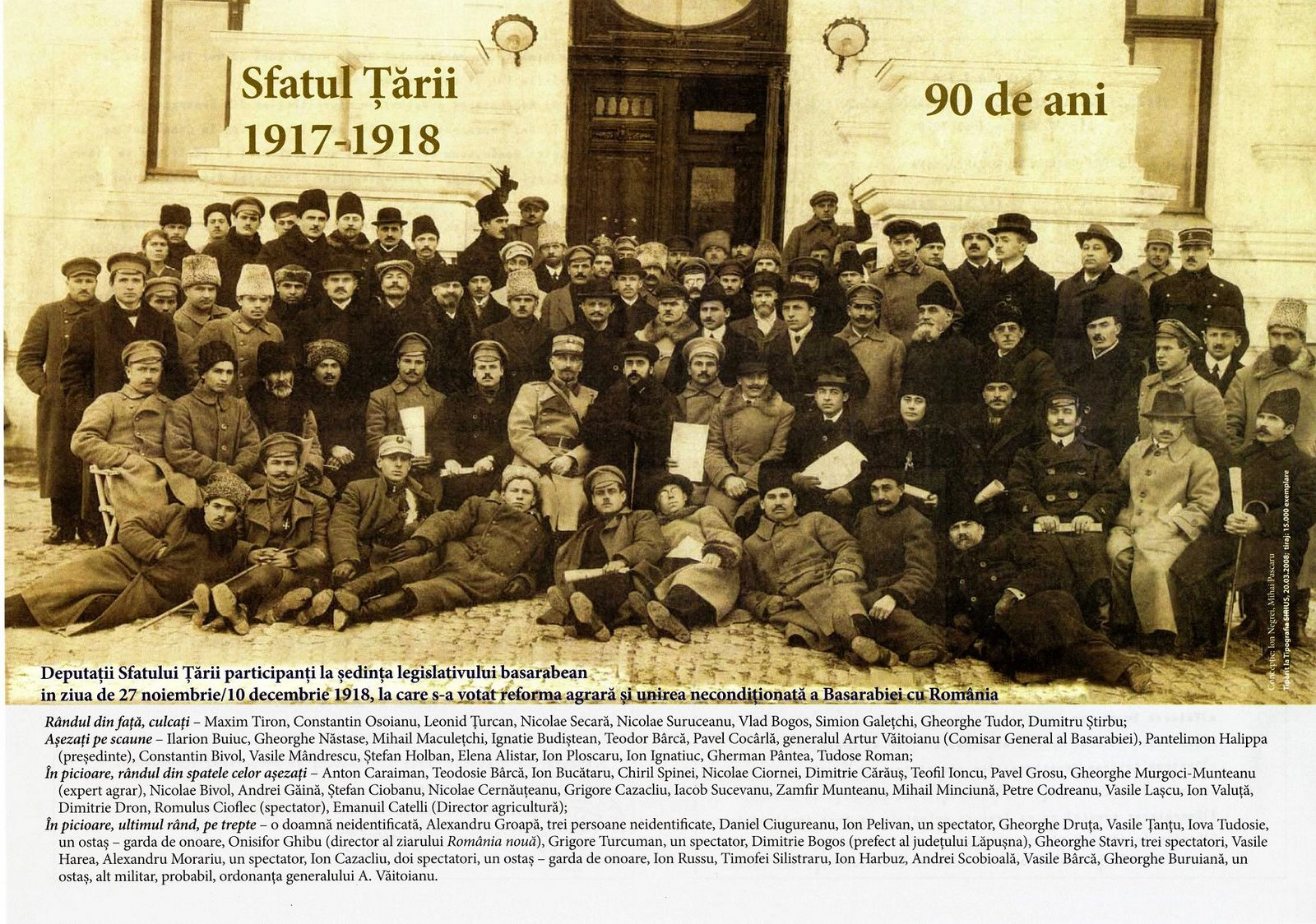
Sfatul Țării Palace, 10 December 1918
