= Ignație Budișteanu =

Romanian politician (1888-?)

Ignatie Budişteanu

Member of the Moldovan Parliament
- In office 1917–1918

Ignaţie Budişteanu (born 1888, Bălți - died 20th century) was a Romanian farmer from Bessarabia, a member of the Socialist Revolutionary Party.

== Biography ==
He served as Member of the Moldovan Parliament (1917–1918). He completed the questionnaire of member of Sfatul Țării it at the age of 30. On March 27, 1918, Ignaţie Budişteanu voted for the unification of Bessarabia with Romania.

== Gallery ==
Moldovan stamp, 1998
