= Sevirova =

- Commune
- Location in Moldova
- Coordinates: 47°55′N 28°9′E
- Country: Moldova
- District: Florești District
- Elevation: 289 ft (88 m)

Population (2014)
  - Total: 1,193
- Time zone: UTC+2 (EET)
  - Summer (DST): UTC+3 (EEST)

Sevirova is a commune in Florești District, Moldova. It is composed of two villages, Ivanovca and Sevirova.

== Notable people ==
- Dimitrie Cărăuș
