= Mihail Starenki =

Bessarabian politician

Member of the Moldovan Parliament
- In office 1917–1918

Personal details
- Born: 8 November 1879 Kamianets-Podilskyi, Khmelnytskyi Oblast

Mihail Starenki (born 8 November 1879, Kamianets-Podilskyi) was a Bessarabian politician.

== Biography ==
He served as Member of the Moldovan Parliament (1917–1918).

== Gallery ==
Moldovan stamp, 1998

== Bibliography ==
- Gheorghe E. Cojocaru, Sfatul Țării: itinerar, Civitas, Chişinău, 1998, ISBN 9975-936-20-2
