= Ion Harbuz =

Bessarabian politician

- Moldovan stamp, 1998

Member of the Moldovan Parliament
- In office 1917–1918

Personal details
- Born: 1886
- Died: Unknown

Ion Harbuz was a Bessarabian politician.

== Biography ==
He served as Member of the Moldovan Parliament (1917–1918).
