= Pantelimon Erhan Cabinet =

Cabinet of Moldova, December 1917–January 1918

Pantelimon Erhan Cabinet was the Cabinet of Moldova (7 / 20 December 1917 - 13 / 26 January 1918).

It was the first cabinet of the Moldavian Democratic Republic. The government fell after the occupation of the Republic by the Romanian troops. Erhan, along with Ion Inculeț, president of the National Assembly, and Gherman Pântea, Director of Armed Forces, were accused by the nationalist Directors of opposing the entry of the Romanian Army, sending the Moldavian National Guard against it, and negotiating with the Bolshevik-dominated council that controlled the capital during early January.

== Membership of the Cabinet ==
On 7 December 1917, Parliament of Moldova (called Sfatul Țării) elected the Cabinet of Moldova (called the Council of Directors General), with nine members, seven Moldavians, one Ukrainian, and one Jew:

- Pantelimon Erhan, President of the Council and Director General of Agriculture
- Ion Pelivan, Director General of Foreign Affairs
- Vladimir Cristi, Director General of Internal Affairs
- Teodor Cojocaru and Gherman Pântea, Director General of War
- Mihail Savenco, Director General of Justice
- Teofil Ioncu, Director General of Finance
- Ştefan Ciobanu, Director General of Public Instruction
- Nicolae Bosie-Codreanu, Director General of Communications
- Veniamin I. Grinfeld, Director General of Industry and Commerce

== Notes ==
Political offices
Preceded by Moldavian Republic formed	Pantelimon Erhan Cabinet of Moldova; 7 December 1917 [O.S. {{{3}}}] 24 November - 28 January [O.S. 15 January] 1918	Succeeded by Daniel Ciugureanu Cabinet
