= Vasile Țanțu =

Bessarabian politician (1882–1937)

Vasile Ţanţu
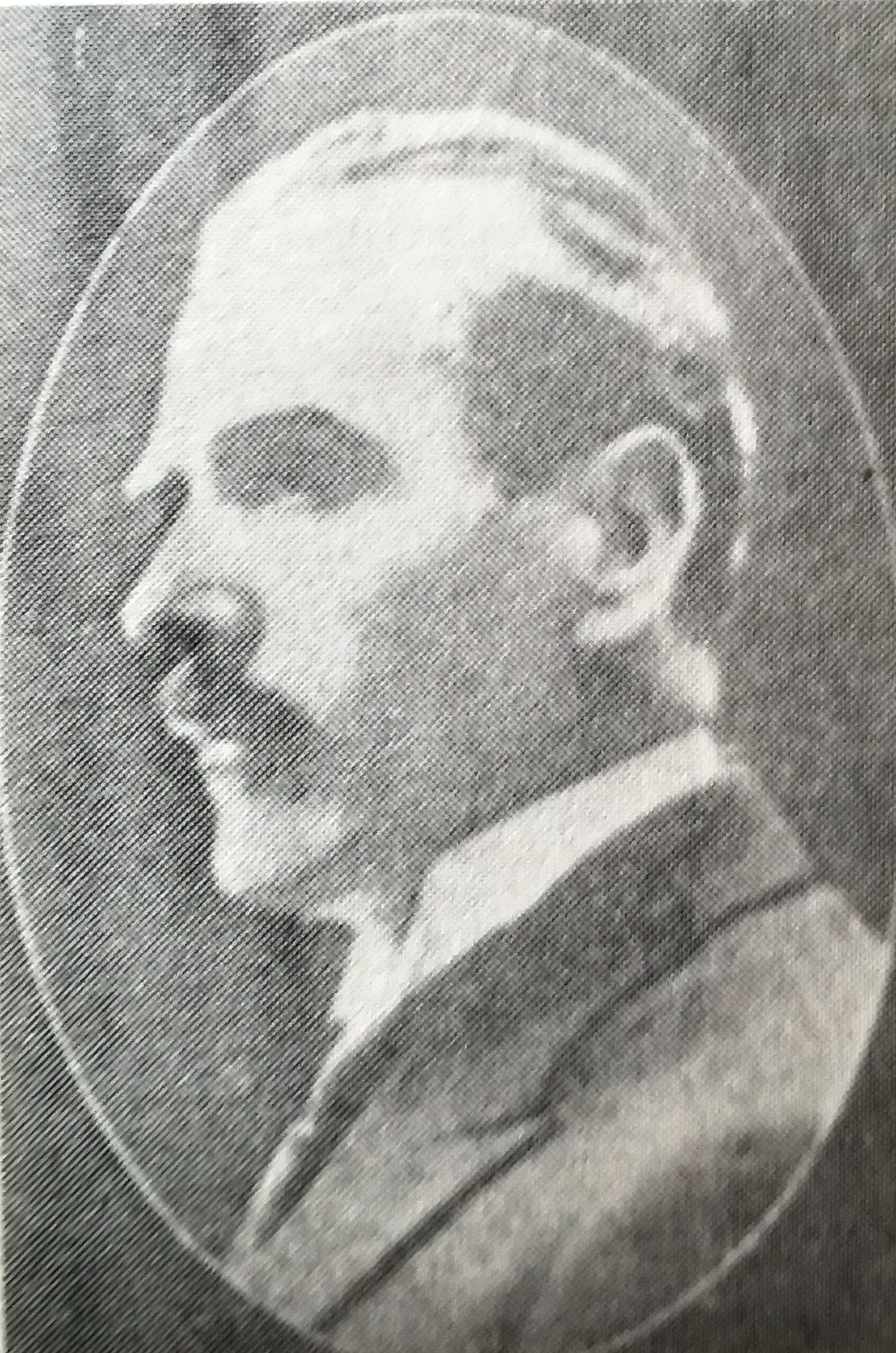
- Țanțu in 1917

Member of the Moldovan Parliament
- In office 1917–1918

Vasile Ţanţu (1 March 1882 – 30 January 1937) was a Bessarabian politician.

== Biography ==
He served as Member of the Moldovan Parliament (1917–1918).

== Gallery ==
Moldovan stamp, 1998

== Bibliography ==
- Gheorghe E. Cojocaru, Sfatul Țării: itinerar, Civitas, Chişinău, 1998, ISBN 9975-936-20-2
- Mihai Taşcă, Sfatul Țării şi actualele autorităţi locale, "Timpul de dimineaţă", no. 114 (849), June 27, 2008 (page 16)
