= Simion Galețchi =

Bessarabian politician

Simeon Galețchi

Member of the Moldovan Parliament
- In office 1917–1918

Personal details
- Born: February 15, 1887 Dondușeni
- Died: 1940s

Simeon Galețchi (born Semjén Gáliczki; February 15, 1887, in Dondușeni) was a Bessarabian politician.

== Biography ==
He served as Member of the Moldovan Parliament (1917–1918).

== Gallery ==
Moldovan stamp, 1998

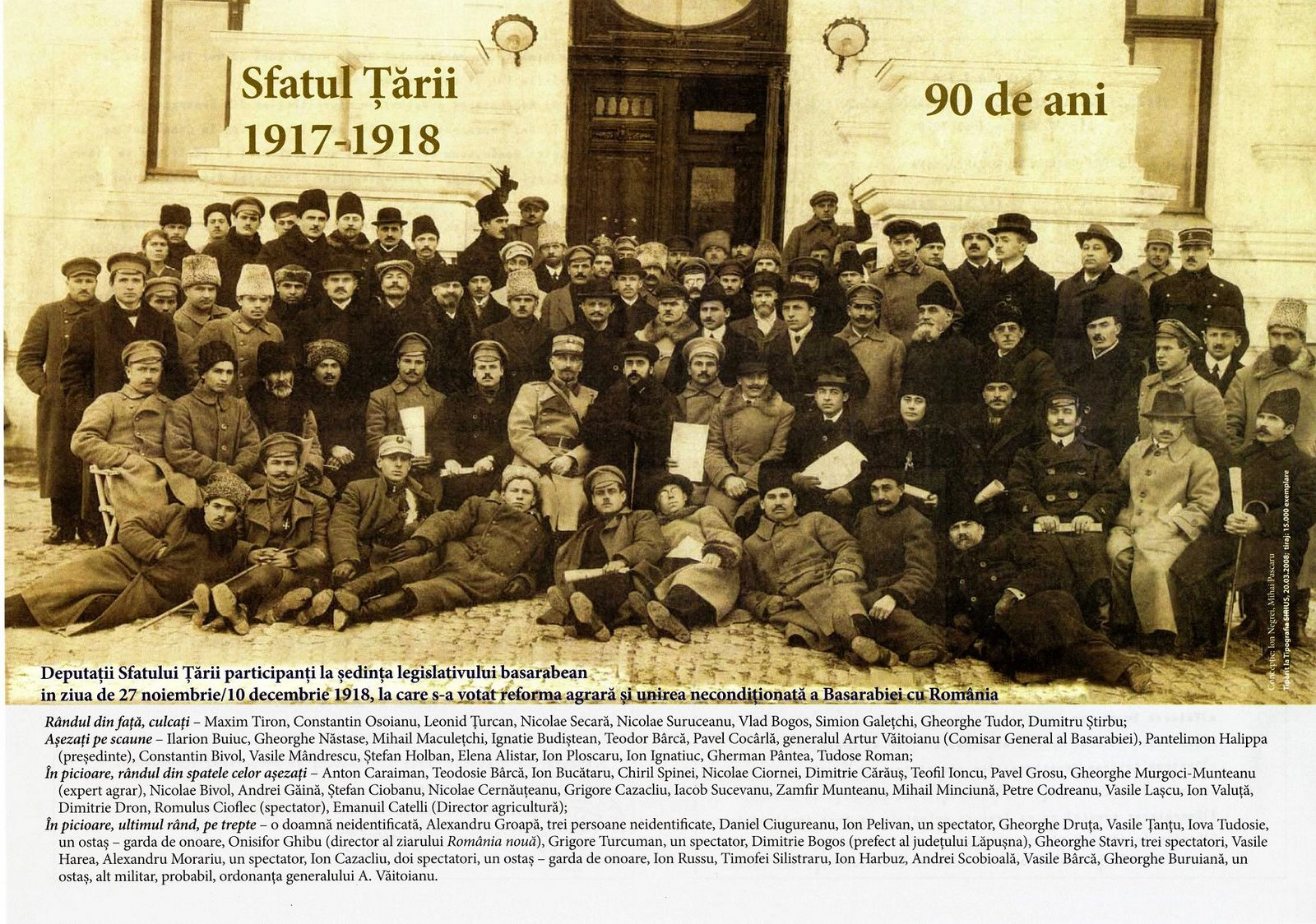
Sfatul Țării Palace, December 10, 1918

== Bibliography ==
- Alexandru Chiriac. Membrii Sfatului Țării. 1917–1918. Dicționar, Editura Fundației Culturale Române, București, 2001.
