= Pohrebeni =

- Commune
- Location in Moldova
- Coordinates: 47°33′N 28°55′E
- Country: Moldova
- District: Orhei District

Population (2014)
  - Total: 2,641
- Time zone: UTC+2 (EET)
  - Summer (DST): UTC+3 (EEST)

Pohrebeni is a commune in Orhei District, Moldova. It is composed of three villages: Izvoare, Pohrebeni and Șercani.

== Notable people ==
- Anton Caraiman
