= Tănătari =

- Village
- Location in Moldova
- Coordinates: 46°43′N 29°25′E
- Country: Moldova
- District: Căușeni District

Population (2014 census)
  - Total: 2,484
- Time zone: UTC+2 (EET)
  - Summer (DST): UTC+3 (EEST)

Tănătari is a small village in Căușeni District, Moldova, known for its rural charm and agricultural traditions.

== Notable people ==
- Pantelimon Erhan
