= Iacov Sucevan =

Bessarabian politician (1869–1929)

Member of the Moldovan Parliament
- In office 1917–1918

Personal details
- Born: 1869
- Died: 26 March 1929 (aged 59–60)

Iacov Sucevan (1869 – 26 March 1929) was a Bessarabian politician.

== Biography ==
He served as Member of the Moldovan Parliament (1917–1918).

== Gallery ==
Moldovan stamp, 1998
