= Felix Dudchievicz =

Bessarabian politician

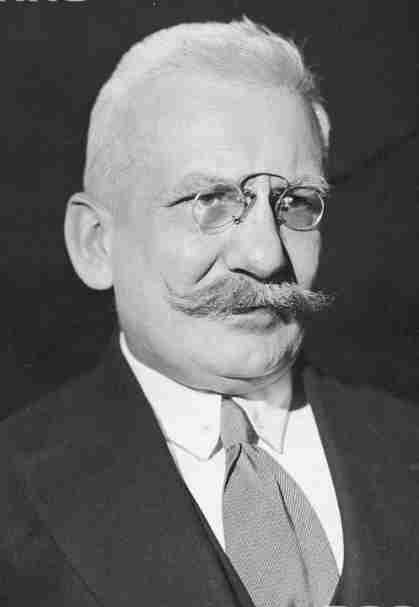

Minister of Justice
- In office 29 December 1929 – 17 March 1930
- Preceded by: Stanisław Car
- Succeeded by: Stanisław Car

Member of the Sfatul Țării
- In office 1917–1918

Personal details
- Born: Lublin

Felix Dudchievicz (c. 1872 - 1932) was a Bessarabian and Polish politician.

== Biography ==
He served as Member of the Sfatul Țării (1917–1918) as the only ethnically Polish one.

== Gallery ==
Moldovan stamp, 1998

== Bibliography ==
- Gheorghe E. Cojocaru, Sfatul Țării: itinerar, Civitas, Chişinău, 1998, ISBN 9975-936-20-2
- Mihai Taşcă, Sfatul Țării şi actualele autorităţi locale, "Timpul de dimineaţă", no. 114 (849), June 27, 2008 (page 16)
