= Afanasie Chiriac =

Bessarabian politician (1891–1977)

Member of the Moldovan Parliament
- In office 1917–1918

Personal details
- Born: 27 March 1891
- Died: 21 October 1977 (aged 86) Iaşi

Afanasie Chiriac (born 27 March 1891 in Corjova, Tighina County, Bessarabia; died 21 October 1977 in Iaşi) was a Bessarabian politician.

== Biography ==
He served as Member of the Moldovan Parliament (1917–1918). On 27 March 1918 he voted for the Union of Bessarabia with Romania. He has worked at various public institutions in Chișinău. From the evidence of security, it appears that he is not known with political activity, neither before nor after August 23, 1944. During the communist period, he did not maintain relations with the other members of the Moldovan Parliament or with other Bassarabians.

== Gallery ==
Moldovan stamp, 1998
