= Ion Popa (1910s politician) =

Moldovan politician (1889–?)

Member of the Moldovan Parliament
- In office 1917–1918

Personal details
- Born: 1889
- Died: Unknown

Ion Popa (born 1889, date of death unknown) was a Bessarabian politician.

== Biography ==
He served as Member of the Moldovan Parliament (1917–1918).

== Bibliography ==
- Alexandru Chiriac. Membrii Sfatului Ţării. 1917–1918. Dicţionar, Editura Fundaţiei Culturale Române, București, 2001.
