= Alexander Loesch =

Bessarabian politician

Alexander von Loesch

Member of the Moldovan Parliament
- In office 1917–1918

Alexander von Loesch was a Bessarabian politician.

== Biography ==
He was a Member of the Moldovan Parliament (1917–1918) and staunch Patriot.
