= Chițcanii Vechi =

- Commune
- Location in Moldova
- Coordinates: 47°36′N 28°30′E
- Country: Moldova
- District: Telenești District

Population (2014)
  - Total: 2,222
- Time zone: UTC+2 (EET)
  - Summer (DST): UTC+3 (EEST)

Chițcanii Vechi is a commune in Telenești District, Moldova. It is composed of two villages, Chițcanii Noi and Chițcanii Vechi.

== Notable people ==
- Andrei Găină
