= Dumitru Dron =

Bessarabian politician (1893–1977)

Member of the Moldovan Parliament
- In office 1917–1918

Personal details
- Born: 30 October 1893
- Died: 22 February 1977 (aged 83)

Dumitru Dron (born 30 October 1893, Cucioaia, Telenești – died 22 February 1977, Simeria, Hunedoara County, Romania) was a Bessarabian politician, a deputy in Sfatul Țării, mandate between 7 February 1918 and 27 November 1918. He was a member of the budget committee.

== Biography ==
He served as Member of the Moldovan Parliament (1917–1918).
