= Nicolae Mămăligă =

Bessarabian politician

Member of the Moldovan Parliament
- In office 1917–1918

Personal details
- Born: 1888 Chişinău
- Died: Unknown

Nicolae Mămăligă (born in Chişinău, 1888) was a Bessarabian politician.

== Biography ==
He served as Member of the Moldovan Parliament (1917–1918).
