= Andrei Găină =

Bessarabian politician (1885–1940)

Member of the Moldovan Parliament
- In office 1917–1918

Andrei Găină (born 1885, Chițcanii Vechi, Teleneşti - died 1940, Chițcanii Vechi, Teleneşti) was a deputy in the first Parliament of Bessarabia "Sfatul Țării" in the years 1917-1918, voting the Union of Bessarabia with Romania.

== Biography ==
Andrei Găină was born in 1885 in the village of Chiţcanii Vechi. He was a farmer. He was a soldier in the Tzarist Army on the fronts of the First World War. Then he was the mayor of Chițcanii Vechi in the years immediately following the Union of 1918. Having no children adopted two girls:

- Raisa Lentovschi, a refugee Russia who graduated from the Faculty of Philology at Iasi, was then a teacher of French and Romanian at Chiţcanii Vechi until 28 June 1940 and after 22 June 1941. He died during childbirth in 1942. She is buried at the village cemetery. In marriage he had the family name Marandici.
- Iulia Coman (born Șova), the biological daughter of Xenofont Șova, deported in 1940 to Siberia. She has fled with her biological mother in Romania in 1940 and 1944. He graduated from the Faculty of Philology. Teacher of French in Buzau. Currently she is at pension age.

He was a member of the Central Committee of Moldovan soldiers in Chișinau. At the Congress of the Moldavian Soldiers on 20–27 August 1917 in Chișinau, he was elected deputy in the Sfatul Țării from Orhei County.

In the interwar years, after the agrarian reform of 1922, it possessed 50 ha of agrarian land.

Andrei Găină died in January 1940. He is buried in the courtyard of the village church. He built the new church in the village. He was married to Theodora. He also had a brother, Constantin (died in 1949 in Chițcanii Vechi), who had several children, now inhabitants of Bessarabia.

== Gallery ==
Moldovan stamp, 1998
