= Serghei Donico-Iordăchescu =

Bessarabian politician

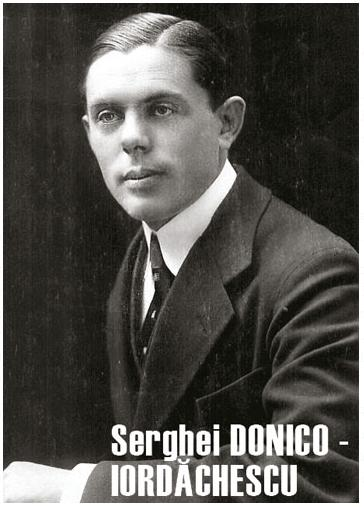

Member of the Moldovan Parliament
- In office 1917–1918

Vicedirector of the Directorate of Internal Affairs of the Moldavian Democratic Republic
- In office 9 April 1918 – 1 December 1918
- Prime Minister: Petru Cazacu

Personal details
- Born: 1889 Chișinău, Bessarabia Governorate, Russian Empire
- Died: July 3, 1932 (aged 42–43) Chișinău, Kingdom of Romania
- Party: Russian Social Democratic Labour Party (Mensheviks)

Serghei Donico-Iordăchescu (1989 – 3 July 1932) was a Bessarabian politician.

== Biography ==
He served as Member of the Moldovan Parliament (1917–1918).

== Gallery ==
Moldovan stamp, 1998
