= Vladimir Chiorescu =

Bessarabian politician

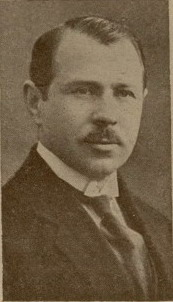

Member of the Moldovan Parliament
- In office 1917–1918

Vladimir Chiorescu (born 1887, Chișinău - died 20th century) was a Bessarabian politician.

== Biography ==
He served as Member of the Moldovan Parliament (1917–1918). On 27 March 1918 Vladimir Chiorescu voted the Union of Bessarabia with Romania.

== Gallery ==
Moldovan stamp, 1998

== Bibliography ==
- Gheorghe E. Cojocaru, Sfatul Țării: itinerar, Civitas, Chişinău, 1998, ISBN 9975-936-20-2
- Mihai Taşcă, Sfatul Țării şi actualele autorităţi locale, "Timpul de dimineaţă", no. 114 (849), June 27, 2008 (page 16)
