= Alexandru Moraru =

Bessarabian politician

Member of the Moldovan Parliament
- In office 1917–1918

Alexandru Moraru was a Bessarabian politician.

== Biography ==
He served as Member of the Moldovan Parliament (1917–1918).

== Gallery ==
Moldovan stamp, 1998
