= Constantin Mimi =

Bessarabian politician and winemaker (1868–1935)

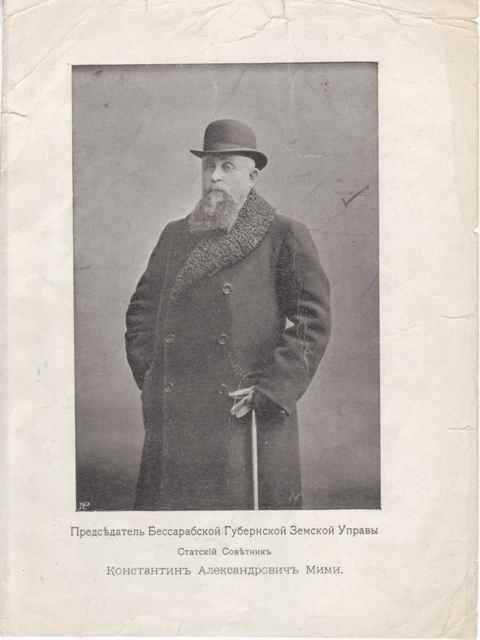

President of the Zemstvo of the Bessarabia Governorate
- In office 1912–1917

Personal details
- Born: 10 March 1868 Chișinău, Bessarabia Governorate, Russian Empire
- Died: 17 April 1935 (aged 67) Chișinău, Kingdom of Romania
- Education: SupAgro; Odessa State University

Constantin Mimi (10 March 1868 – 17 April 1935) was a Bessarabian politician and winemaker, whose family had noble origins.

== Biography ==
He graduated from Odessa State University and SupAgro (Montpellier).

When the February Revolution happened in Petrograd in 1917, the governor of Bessarabia Governorate stepped down and passed his legal powers to Constantin Mimi, the President of the Gubernial Zemstvo, which was named the Commissar of the Provisional Government in Bessarabia, with Vladimir Criste his deputy. Similar procedures took place in all regions of the Russian Empire: the chiefs of the Tsarist administrations passed their legal powers to the chiefs of the County and Governorate Zemstvos, which were then called County/Governorate Commissars.

On 20 July [O.S. 2 July] 1917, Constantin Mimi, the official Commissar of the Russian Provisional Government (of Kerenski) in Chişinău, gathered delegates of all major political, national, professional and administrative organizations to a "delegation" to protest and reject the pretensions of the Ukrainian Central Rada to annex Bessarabia.

The Peasants Congress, which took place in October 1917, voted Constantin Mimi out and Ion Inculeţ as the new Commissar. This move was planned by Alexander Kerenski, who sent Inculeţ, an associate professor at the University of Petrograd, to Bessarabia to take hold of the situation. As soon as the Peasants Congress, which had no legal power, voted, Kerenski formally replaced Mimi with Inculeţ.

After the Union of Bessarabia with Romania, Constantin Mimi moved to Bucharest and became the director of the National Bank of Romania.
