= Boris Epure =

Bessarabian politician (1882–1938)

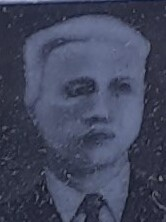

Member of the Moldovan Parliament
- In office 1917–1918

Personal details
- Born: 1882 Chișinău, Russian Empire
- Died: December 12, 1938 (aged 55–56) Chișinău, Kingdom of Romania

Boris Epure (1882 – 12 December 1938) was a Bessarabian politician. He served as Member of the Moldovan Parliament (1917–1918).

== Gallery ==
Moldovan stamp, 1998

== Bibliography ==
- Gheorghe E. Cojocaru, Sfatul Țării: itinerar, Civitas, Chişinău, 1998, ISBN 9975-936-20-2
- Mihai Taşcă, Sfatul Țării şi actualele autorităţi locale, "Timpul de dimineaţă", no. 114 (849), June 27, 2008 (page 16)
