= Gheorghe Buruiană =

Moldovan politician (1889–1933)

Member of the Moldovan Parliament
- In office 1917–1918

Gheorghe Buruiană (1889 - 1933), a cooperator from Chişinăuon March 27, 1918 voted the Union of Bessarabia with România. Some acts of March 27 have signed them together with Teodosie Bârcă as Vice-Presidents of the Moldovan Parliament.

== Biography ==
He served as Member of the Moldovan Parliament (1917–1918).

== Gallery ==
Moldovan stamp, 1998

== Bibliography ==
- Gheorghe E. Cojocaru, Sfatul Țării: itinerar, Civitas, Chişinău, 1998, ISBN 9975-936-20-2
- Mihai Taşcă, Sfatul Țării şi actualele autorităţi locale, "Timpul de dimineaţă", no. 114 (849), June 27, 2008 (page 16)
