= Petru Picior-Mare =

Bessarabian politician

Member of the Moldovan Parliament
- In office 1917–1918

Petru Picior-Mare was a Bessarabian politician.

He served as Member of the Moldovan Parliament (1917–1918).

== Gallery ==
Moldovan stamp, 1998
