= Ilarion Buiuc =

Moldovan politician

Member of the Moldovan Parliament
- In office 1917–1918

Personal details
- Born: 1891
- Died: Unknown

Ilarion Buiuc (born 1891, date of death unknown) was a Moldovan deputy elected by the Moldovan Military Congress in the Moldovan Parliament.

== Biography ==
He served as Member of the Moldovan Parliament (1917–1918). On March 27, 1918, he voted for the unification of Bessarabia with Romania.

== Gallery ==
Moldovan stamp, 1998

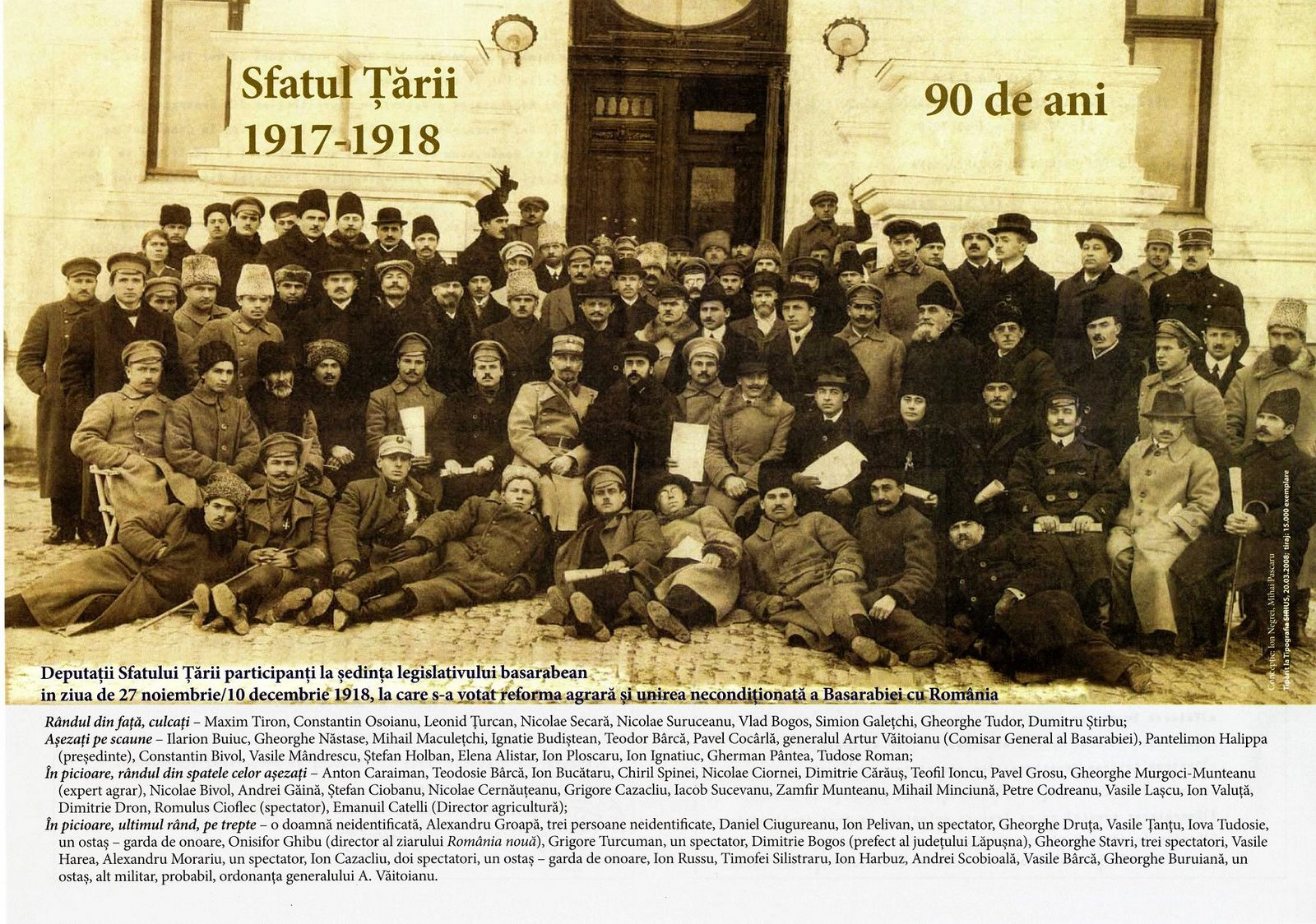
Palace Sfatului Ţării (December 10, 1918)
