= Danilevsky =

Danilevsky, also Danilevski, Danilewsky (Russian: Данилевский), feminine: Danilevskaya/Danilewskaya is a surname. It may refer to:

- Alexander Mikhailovsky-Danilevsky (1789–1848), Russian Lieutenant General, senator, military writer, historian and author
- Alexandre Danilevski, Russian-born French composer, lutenist, vielle player,
- Grigory Danilevsky (1829–1890), Russian historical novelist
- Nikolay Danilevsky (1822–1885), Russian naturalist, historian, economist, and philosopher
- Vasily Danilewsky (1852–1939), Ukrainian-born Russian physician, physiologist and parasitologist
