= Nicolae Bosie-Codreanu =

Moldovan politician (1885–1969)

Director General for Railroads
- In office 21 December [O.S. 8 December] 1917 – 1918
- President: Ion Inculeț
- Prime Minister: Pantelimon Erhan

Member of Sfatul Țării
- In office 1917–1918

Personal details
- Born: 21 December 1885 Noua Suliță, Bessarabia Governorate, Russian Empire
- Died: 1969 (aged 83–84) Timișoara, Socialist Republic of Romania
- Party: Bessarabian Peasants' Party
- Occupation: Politician, engineer

Nicolae Bosie-Codreanu (21 December 1885 – 1969) was a Bessarabian politician who voted for the Union of Bessarabia with Romania on 27 March 1918.

== Biography ==
Bosie-Codreanu was born in 1885 in Noua Suliță, then in the Bessarabia Governorate of the Russian Empire, now the city of Novoselytsia in Chernivtsi Oblast, Ukraine.

An engineer by formation, he served as Member of Sfatul Țării from 1917 to 1918. After 21 December [O.S. 8 December] 1917, he served in the Pantelimon Erhan Cabinet as Director General for Railroads (Romanian: Director general responsabil pentru căile ferate, poște, telegraf și telefon).

In the interwar period he was a member of the Bessarabian Peasants' Party and worked as an engineer, director in the Ministry of Construction in Bucharest.

== Gallery ==
Moldovan stamp, 1998

== Bibliography ==
- Ion Constantin, Ion Negrei, Pantelimon Halippa – tribun al Basrabiei, București: Biblioteca Bucureștilor, 2009. ISBN 978-973-8369-65-8
- Gheorghe E. Cojocaru, Sfatul Țării: itinerar, Civitas, Chişinău, 1998, ISBN 9975-936-20-2
- Mihail Tașcă, Sfatul Țării și actualele autorități locale, "Timpul de dimineață", no. 114 (849), 27 June 2008 (page 16)
