= Chiril Sberea =

Bessarabian politician

Member of the Moldovan Parliament
- In office 1917–1918

Chiril Sberea was a Bessarabian politician.

== Biography ==
He served as Member of the Moldovan Parliament (1917–1918). He voted for the Union of Bessarabia with Romania. He was also a Second lieutenant in the army, serving in the Romanian Front.

== Gallery ==
Moldovan stamp, 1998
