= Efimie Palii =

Bessarabian politician

Member of the Moldovan Parliament
- In office 1917–1918

Efimie Palii was a Bessarabian politician.

== Biography ==
He served as Member of the Moldovan Parliament (1917–1918).
