= Pantelimon Erhan =

Moldovan politician

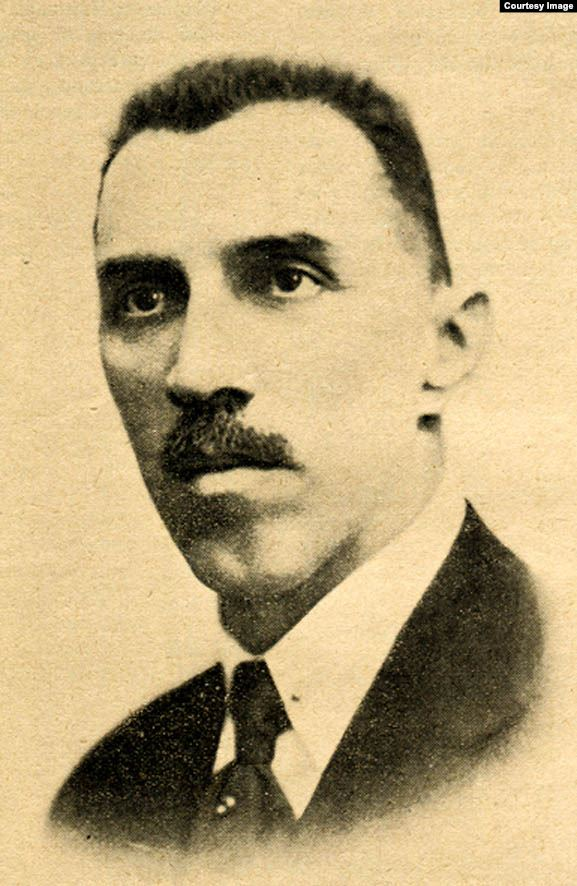
- Erhan in 1929

1st Prime Minister of the Moldavian Democratic Republic
- In office 7 December 1917 – 13 January 1918
- President: Ion Inculeț
- Preceded by: formation of the Republic
- Succeeded by: Daniel Ciugureanu

Director General of Public Instruction
- In office 1917–1918
- Preceded by: Ştefan Ciobanu

Member of the Moldovan Parliament
- In office 1917–1918

Member of the Senate of Romania

Member of the Russian Constituent Assembly
- In office 1917–1918

Personal details
- Born: 1884 Tănătari, Bessarabia Governorate, Russian Empire (now Moldova)
- Died: April/May 1971 Bucharest, Socialist Republic of Romania
- Party: Socialist Revolutionary Party; National Liberal Party
- Other political affiliations: National Moldavian Party; Bessarabian Peasants' Party; League against Usury (1929-1932); National Renaissance Front (1938-1940)
- 1. The name was President of the Council of Directors General.

Pantelimon Erhan (1884 – April/May 1971) was a Bessarabian politician and prime minister of the Moldavian Democratic Republic (1917–1918).

== Biography ==
Pantelimon Erhan was born in 1884 in Tănătari, Căușeni District. He died in April or May 1971 in Bucharest.

== Prime minister ==
He was the first prime minister of the Moldavian Democratic Republic (7 December [O.S. 24 November] 1917 - 29 January [O.S. 16 January] 1918).

On 7 December [O.S. 24 November] 1917, Sfatul Țării elected the Pantelimon Erhan Cabinet (named the Council of Directors General), with nine members and with Pantelimon Erhan as President of the Council of Directors General and Director General for Agriculture. Agrarian reform was a cornerstone priority of the Moldavian Democratic Republic government.

The presence of the Romanian Army in the Moldavian Democratic Republic caused tension within the council, with some of its members, including Pantelimon Erhan, protesting against it. In particular, they feared that the Romanian government, dominated by large land owners, could use the troops to prevent the envisaged agrarian reform.

Pantelimon Erhan was elected in the Russian Constituent Assembly, but, after its dissolution by the Bolshevik Government, moved closer to the pan-Romanianists. He joined the leadership of the National Moldavian Party, being expelled from the Socialist Revolutionary Party. Erhan voted for the union of Bessarabia with Romania and was later elected in the Senate of Romania.

== See also ==
- Pantelimon Erhan Cabinet

Political offices
| Preceded by formation of Moldavian Republic | Prime Minister of Moldova; 7 December [O.S. 24 November] 1917 - 29 January [O.S. 16 January] 1918 | Succeeded by Daniel Ciugureanu |
