= Ion Buzdugan =

Bessarabian-Romanian poet, folklorist, and politician (1887–1967)

Ion Alion Buzdugan
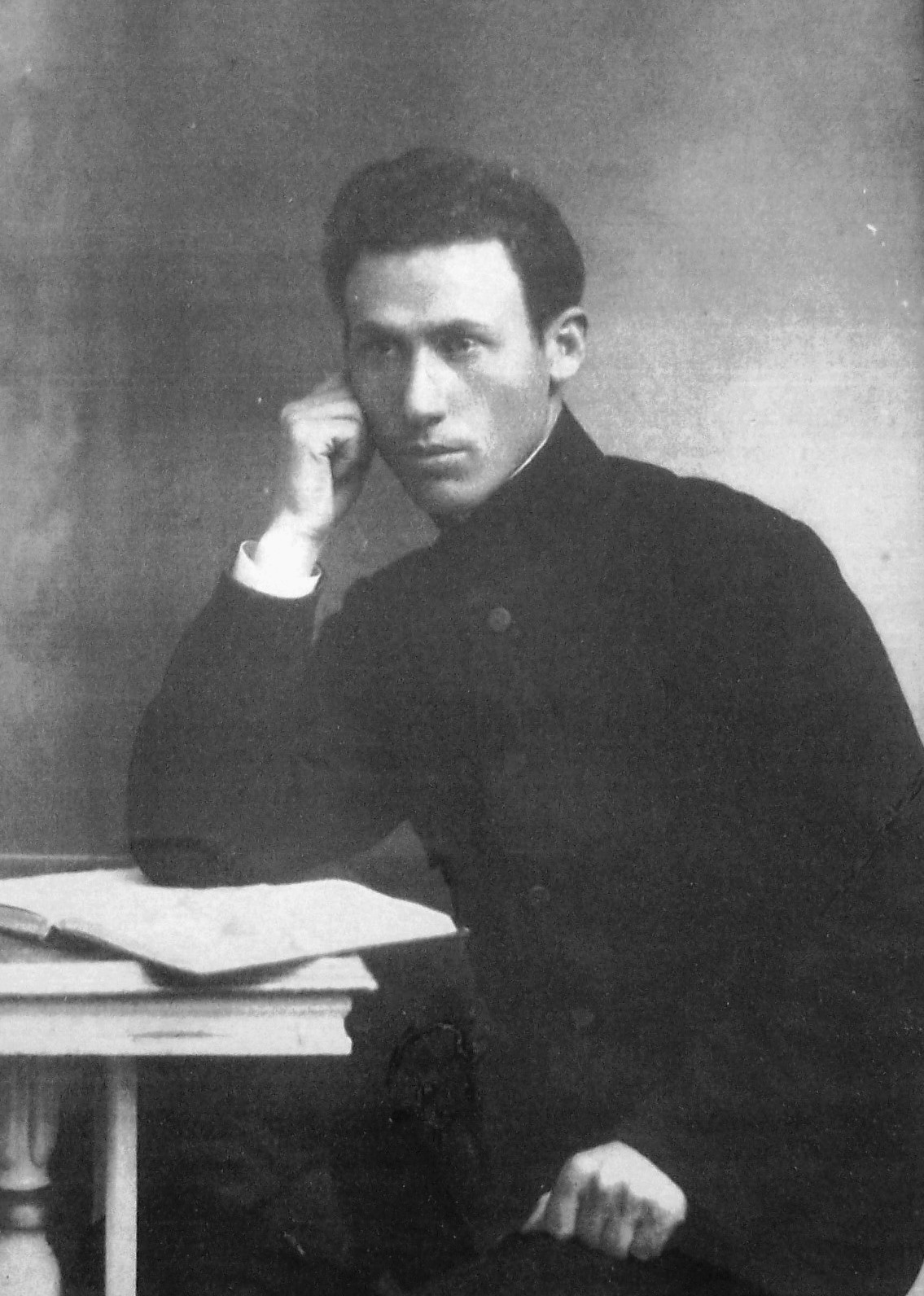
- Buzdugan, c. 1914

Member of Sfatul Țării
- In office November 1917 – November 1918
- Constituency: Bălți County

Member of the Assembly of Deputies
- In office November 1919 – May 1925
- In office June 1926 – July 1932

Personal details
- Born: Ivan Alexandrovici Buzdâga; March 9, 1887 Brînzenii Noi, Bessarabia Governorate, Russian Empire
- Died: January 29, 1967 (aged 79) Bucharest, Communist Romania
- Party: National Moldavian Party (1917); Socialist Revolutionary Party (1917); Bessarabian Peasants' Party (1918); Peasants' Party (1921); National Peasants' Party (1926); Peasants' Party–Lupu (1927); Democratic Nationalist Party (ca. 1933); Romanian Front (1935)
- Profession: Poet, folklorist, translator, schoolteacher, journalist, lawyer
- Nickname: Nică Romanaș

Ion Alion Buzdugan (Romanian Cyrillic and Russian: Ион Буздуган, born Ivan Alexandrovici Buzdâga; March 9, 1887 – January 29, 1967) was a Bessarabian-Romanian poet, folklorist, and politician. A young schoolteacher in the Russian Empire by 1908, he wrote poetry and collected folklore emphasizing Bessarabia's links with Romania, and associated with various founding figures of the Romanian nationalist movement, beginning with Ion Pelivan. Buzdugan was a far-left figure during the February Revolution, but eventually rallied with the National Moldavian Party in opposition to the socialists and the Bolsheviks. He vehemently supported the union of Bessarabia with Romania during the existence of an independent Moldavian Democratic Republic, and, as a member of its legislature (Sfatul Țării), worked to bring it about. Threatened by the Bolsheviks, he fled to Romania and returned with an expeditionary corps headed by General Ernest Broșteanu, being one of the delegates who voted for the union, and one of dignitaries who signed its proclamation.

In interwar Greater Romania, Buzdugan received mixed reviews as a neo-traditionalist poet, while also serving terms as a Bălți County representative in the Assembly of Deputies. There, he advocated decentralization and a system of zemstva, but opposed Bessarabian autonomy, while also becoming noted for his hawkish stance against the Soviet Union, his radicalized nationalism, and his antisemitic outbursts. He was successively a member of the Bessarabian Peasants' Party, the Peasants' Party, the National Peasants' Party, the Peasants' Party–Lupu, and the Democratic Nationalists. For a while, he was employed as a civil administrator, before delving in fascist politics with the Romanian Front.

His political activity made him a target of repression under the Romanian communist regime, but he avoided arrest by going into hiding during the late 1940s and early '50s. Protected by the literary critic Perpessicius, he later reemerged, but, until the time of his death, was only allowed to publish pseudonymous translations from Russian literature, culminating with a posthumous rendition of Eugene Onegin. Since the 1990s, his poetic work has been recovered and reassessed in both Romania and Moldova.

== Biography ==
=== Early years ===
According to updated reference works, the future Ion Buzdugan was born in 1887 in Brînzenii Noi (now in Telenești District, Moldova), the son of peasants Alexandru and Ecaterina Buzdâga, who also had seven daughters. One 1936 entry claims that he was born in 1889 in Buzdugeni. Both villages were at the time included in the Russian Empire's Bessarabian Governorate, and the young man was educated at a teachers' seminary in Bayramcha. He later studied agriculture, law and literature in Russian schools in Kamianets-Podilskyi and Moscow. Buzdugan, who claimed to have lodged with, and befriended, the Ukrainian poet Ivan Franko, eventually took a license to practice law from Moscow University.

Influenced to some degree by the work of Mihai Eminescu, he began writing his own poetry, published in Bessarabian magazines from 1905, under the pseudonym Nică Romanaș (or Românaș, "Nică the Romanian Fella"). Other pen names he used include B. Cogâlnic, Ion Câmpeanu, and I. Dumbrăveanu. He became involved with the groups of Romanian nationalists then forming in the Governorate, writing for their newspaper Basarabia, and, while in Kamianets, establishing contacts with the Romanians east of Bessarabia.

In 1907–1909, a schoolteacher in Bursuceni, he associated the Romanian national club founded by judge Ion Pelivan. His activity there brought him under the watch of the Okhrana, and, during the subsequent clampdown, he received a punishment for having taught his students in Romanian. Nevertheless, he remained active in the nationalist circles and, by 1913, was in contact with Cuvânt Moldovenesc journal, which he also edited for a while, again as N. Romanaș. He also began a lifetime work of collecting Romanian folklore, and, despite such work being repressed by the Russian authorities, documented the folkloric links between Bessarabia and other Romanian-inhabited regions. The folk songs of his collections also pointed to the Bessarabians' dissatisfaction with Tsarist autocracy, against claims that they enjoyed that regime more than they supported Romania.

Buzdugan volunteered as an officer in the Imperial Russian Army, engaged in the Romanian theater of war. At some point during the events of the Russian Revolution, he and his Bessarabian colleague, Gherman Pântea, rallied with the revolutionary far-left, joining the Socialist Revolutionary Party; according to other sources, they may have even been involved with the Bolsheviks. By the time of the February Revolution, Buzdugan had entered the Moldavian Soldiers' Organization in Odessa, and took up the task of propaganda work among the Bessarabian units of the Imperial Russian Army. He was still active as a writer, networking with his colleagues from Western Moldavia. By February 1917, he had joined the literary circle Academia Bârlădeană, becoming close friends with George Tutoveanu and Alexandru Vlahuță. While on the front lines, he helped save the life of the Romanian officer and fellow writer Camil Petrescu.

=== National Moldavian Party ===
After March 13, 1917, both Buzdugan and Pântea became members of Paul Gore's National Moldavian Party (PNM), the driving force of Romanian nationalism in the former Governorate, and were co-opted on its steering committee. However, as later noted by the party colleague Pan Halippa, Buzdugan was categorically opposed to the PNM's right-wing, which looked to "Bessarabia's secession from Russia and her Union with Romania." Taken by the Russian army to Iași, the provisional Romanian capital, he befriended Mihail Sadoveanu and other contributors to România newspaper. His mailing address was the paper's headquarters, which was also the domicile of playwright Barbu Ștefănescu Delavrancea. He therefore kept contact with the Romanian nationalists, including the historian Nicolae Iorga. Iorga recalled that Buzdugan was agitated in favor of socialist reforms and critical of the Romanian King Ferdinand I, somewhat supportive of a Russian-backed uprising, and favoring mass desertion. At the time, he spoke a "picturesque" Moldavian dialect, mixed with Russian neologisms.

On April 10, Buzdugan attended the Bessarabian Schoolteachers' Congress, presided upon by Alexandr K. Schmidt and comprising educators of all nationalities. There, he agitated in favor of a split, calling on Romanian teachers to form their own "cleanly Moldavian" congress, and supporting the idea of intensive courses to formalize and standardize their language. Buzdugan sought to convince his public that what they called "Moldavian" was the same as Romanian, and to prove his point he read them fragments from the 1688 Cantacuzino Bible. He also advocated the introduction of the Latin alphabet, to replace Cyrillic everywhere, including in zemstva schools. In May, with such autonomist goals in mind, Buzdugan, Pântea and Anton Crihan founded the newspaper Pământ și Voe, styled "Organ of the Moldavian Socialist Revolutionary Party". Additionally, together with the playwright Sergiu Victor Cujbă, he founded a people's university and a peasants' theater.

Buzdugan, Grigore Cazacliu, Vasile Țanțu and Andrei Scobioală soon set up a Moldavian Committee of the Romanian War Front, which began collecting Romanian church literature and primers, to be used in the struggle against Russification. The committee watched with alarm as the Ukrainian People's Republic made overtures to incorporate Bessarabia into her borders. The Ukrainian Rada received a letter of protest written for the Bessarabian soldiers' organization by Buzdugan. It argued that, "on the basis of historical, ethnographic rights, of her distinct customs and of her economic situation", Bessarabia had "an imprescriptible right to complete autonomy." Buzdugan was also one of the founders of the PNM-and-Committee tribune, Soldatul Moldovan, and returned to his career in the Bessarabian press.

According to Iorga, Buzdugan was already going through a "taming" process, and warned the Romanians that Russian radicals were plotting a coup. Buzdugan himself claimed to have met a congratulatory King Ferdinand, using the occasion to press him for a nationwide land reform. In late October 1917, he participated in the Moldavian Soldiers' Congress of Chișinău, where it was decided to form Sfatul Țării, the Bessarabian legislature. During the proceedings, Buzdugan and Toma Jalbă insisted in favor of annexing to Bessarabia the Romanian-speaking areas east of the river Dniester (Nistru); although this failed to occur, their speeches were welcomed with applause by other delegates. The Congress appointed him to an Organizational Bureau that also comprised Halippa, Ion Inculeț, Teofil Ioncu, and Pantelimon Erhan. It was the provisional governing body of the region, and wrote down that laws and regulations for the legislative election of that month.

Buzdugan himself was elected to Sfatul Țării, representing Bălți County, and joined the Moldavian Bloc, a parliamentary club reuniting former PNM members (informally: "Pelivan's godsons") with the other Romanian nationalists. Buzdugan and Erhan supported Pelivan as leader of Sfatul, clashing with the left-wing "Peasants' Faction", the Mensheviks led by Eugen Kenigschatz, and non-Romanian deputies such as Krste Misirkov. This coalition preferred the leftist Inculeț, who did not approve of Bessarabia's secession from the Russian Republic. Against Buzdugan's protests, Pelivan asked his followers to also support Inculeț.

In November 1917, during the Bolshevik Revolution in Russia, Buzdugan was one of the secretaries of Bessarabian Soldiers' Congress, part of a presidium headed by Vasile Cijevschi. This assembly voted favorably on the region's emancipation, referencing the right to self-determination. In December, Sfatul proclaimed the Moldavian Democratic Republic, a quasi-independent state. Pelivan and his "godsons", who were pushing for the union with Romania, found themselves harassed by Bolshevik groups such as Front-Odel (confederated with the Rumcherod and loyal to the new Russian Soviet Federative Socialist Republic). They began preparing for an armed confrontation. Buzdugan and Scobioală also acted as liaisons between the Romanian Land Forces, under Constantin Prezan, and the White Russians, represented locally by Dmitry Shcherbachev of the 7th Army.

=== Union process ===
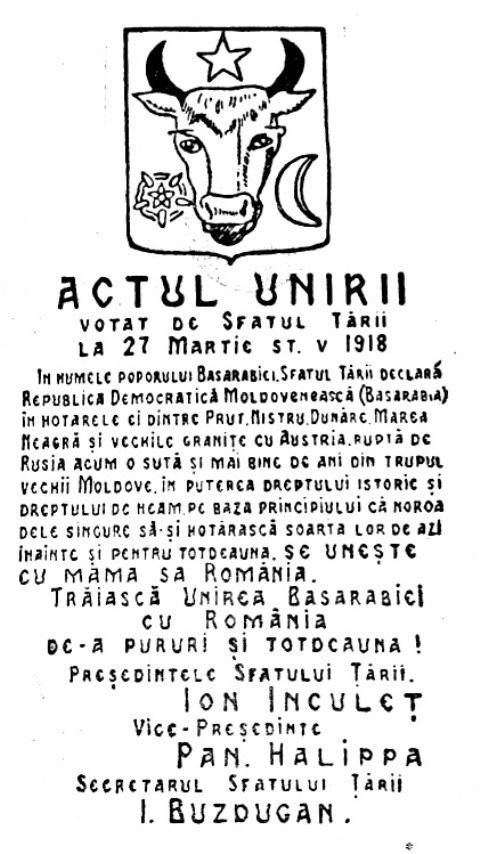
The Act of Union of the Moldavian Democratic Republic, carrying Buzdugan's name

Eventually, disguised as Russian soldiers, and accompanied by sailor Vasile Gafencu, the "godsons" left Chișinău and headed for Iași, where they contacted the Romanian Army. On January 12, the Romanians, under General Ernest Broșteanu, crossed the border to suppress the Bolshevik uprising (see Romanian military intervention in Bessarabia). Buzdugan, with Crihan, Pelivan, Gafencu, Țanțu and Gheorghe Buruiană, followed them closely. Later sources suggest that Buzdugan and his Moldavian Committee set up a unit of the Republican Army, which reportedly fought against the Bolsheviks during subsequent skirmishes.

When the act of union as put up for debate in the Sfatul session of April 9 [O.S. March 27], 1918, Buzdugan was among the 86-member majority who voted in favor. During the preliminary talks, he had seconded the Romanian Prime Minister, Alexandru Marghiloman, reassuring the Peasant Faction, and Inculeț, that land reform would be enacted in Romania. By then a leader of the Moldavian Bloc, he urged his colleagues to support union as stemming from "the principle of self-determination", and "the most revolutionary act in the history of our people". As Sfatul Secretary, together with Inculeț, the President of the Republic, and Halippa, the Vice President, he signed into law the union proclamation. Buzdugan was also the one selected to read the proclamation in the plenum session.

Buzdugan was working on a volume of patriotic poetry, which came out that year as Țara mea ("My Country"). In October 1918, Sfatul Țării's eponymous journal put out his monograph on the history of boyardom and peasantry in Bessarabia. Late that November, he was reelected Secretary of Sfatul, in circumstances that were deemed illegal by the anti-unionist opposition; under his watch, unconditional union (which excluded the regionalist provisions of the March document) was put to the vote. Buzdugan joined Halippa, Pelivan, and Cazacliu on a Sfatul mission to Cernăuți, in Bukovina, and Alba Iulia, in Transylvania, where they were to attend popular assemblies confirming the establishment of Greater Romania. In Bukovina, Buzdugan expressed his enthusiasm for "our national cause, the awakening of the entire nation between the Nistru and the Tisa." However, bedridden with the Spanish flu in Cernăuți, he was unable to follow Pelivan to Alba Iulia, and failed to witness Transylvania's incorporation into Romania on December 1 ("Great Union").

In his last days as a Sfatul deputy, Buzdugan signed a protest addressed to the Romanian government of Ion I. C. Brătianu, citing cases of abuse by the Gendarme "satraps", including their alleged embezzlement of welfare supplies. The document warned that the nation was "nowhere near to moral unity, to the one guarantee that formal union would be strengthened". From January 1919, he was among the founders of a credit union, formed to assist Bessarabian peasants in view of the land reform. Its steering committee also included Halippa, Buruiană, Crihan, Vasile Bârcă, Teofil Ioncu, Vasile Mândrescu, Mihail Minciună, and Nicolae Suruceanu.

=== Beginnings in Greater Romania ===
On April 27, Buzdugan and many of his credit union colleagues rallied with the PNM's successor, the Bessarabian Peasants' Party (PȚB). He was voted, with Pântea, a member of its Central Committee. He served continuously in Romania's Assembly of Deputies, where he represented Bălți County, from November 1919 to July 1932. During his first term, he embraced leftist causes and "leaned toward class struggle", backing the Alexandru Vaida-Voevod-led coalition against the National Liberal Party. In March 1920, days after Vaida had been recalled by King Ferdinand, Buzdugan read out the PȚB's protest against this coup.

He shared his party's opposition to the policies of the new People's Party government, and spoke out against its interventions in the local administration of Bessarabia. In July 1920, he took the rostrum to address the sacking of A. Crudu, the Prefect of Hotin County, claiming that the latter had been abused and humiliated by the authorities. Buzdugan rallied with the Halippa faction of the PȚB, which sought integration within the nationwide Peasants' Party (PȚ); the other wings, comprising Inculeț, Pântea and Pelivan, preferred independence. He was one of 9 parliamentarians who, together with Halippa and the non-PȚB agrarian theorist Constantin Stere, joined the PȚ in on July 18, 1921. Under Inculeț's presidency, the PȚB excluded him on July 22.

His literary career took off, and his subsequent poetic work was soon taken up in literary newspapers and magazines all across Greater Romania. These include: Viața Romînească, Adevărul Literar și Artistic, Convorbiri Literare, Cuget Românesc, Gândirea, Luceafărul, Sburătorul, Convorbiri Literare, Flacăra, Lamura, and Drum Drept. He also became one of the staff poets at Sandu Teleajen's review, Gând Românesc, in December 1921. Buzdugan was inducted into the Romanian Writers' Society, and co-founded the Bessarabian Writers' Society. Completing his studies at the University of Iași, he took a Doctorate in Political Economy from Cernăuți University.

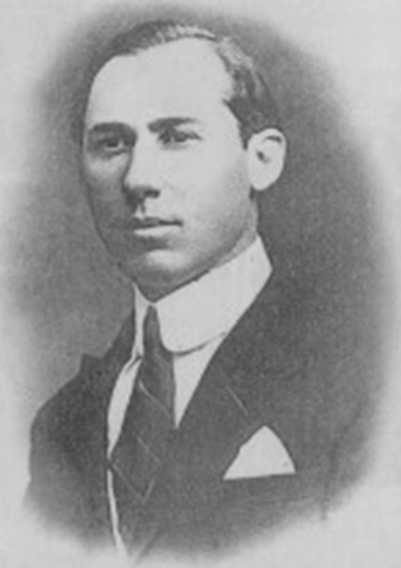
Buzdugan in the 1920s

Made a Commander of both the Order of the Crown and the Star of Romania, as well as a recipient of the Ferdinand Medal, he took up practice as a lawyer, based in Bucharest and Bălți. His work in letters and folkloristics was collected in five retrospective volumes: Cântece din războiu ("Songs from the War", 1921), Cântece din stepă ("Songs from the Steppe", 1923), Cântece din Basarabia ("Songs from Bessarabia", two volumes: 1921, 1928), Miresme din stepă ("Scents of the Steppe", 1922), and a reprint of Țara mea (1928). In 1923, he won a national prize for poetry, granted by the Romanian Ministry of Arts. With Gheorghe Bogdan-Duică, C. S. Făgețel and N. A. Constantinescu, he also contributed a Festschrift for Iorga, published in 1921.

His poems, several of which dealt with themes of national fulfillment addressed to "Mother-Country", were often in dialect. According to literary historian George Călinescu, they "sound to us like the French-Canadian language must sound to the French." Iorga described them as an expression of the "primitive but powerful soul", with rhymes of "patient naivete", and overall "vastly superior" to those of Alexei Mateevici. Eugen Lovinescu, the modernist doyen, found Miresme din stepă to be almost entirely "un-literary", only valid as "proofs of Romanian cultural continuity during a time of alienation": "we can only approach [the book] for its cultural interest and while numbing our aesthetic scruples." A similar point was made by Șerban Cioculescu: "I. Buzdugan's poems cannot be said to be attractive in their beauty. All elements are lacking: no sensitivity, no imagination, no originality of ideas or artistic forms." He described Cântece din stepă as derivative from the works of Octavian Goga or Vasile Alecsandri, and instructive as to the comparative underdevelopment of Bessarabian literature. Cioculescu also noted that Buzdugan had not mastered Romanian grammar, his spelling errors "all too numerous to be disregarded."

As noted by critic Răzvan Voncu, Buzdugan's lyrical contribution stands for neo-traditionalism, in the manner of Gândirea writers, but is "spontaneous" and without influence from Expressionism. Voncu rates Buzdugan as a "second-shelf" traditionalist—ranking below Adrian Maniu or Aron Cotruș, but more valuable than Sandu Tudor, Radu Gyr, or Vintilă Ciocâlteu. According to writer Ion Țurcanu, his sonnet Păstorii ("The Shepherds") is "of exceptional quality", with its "expression of the rustic universe" and its grasp of "the unsuspected materialness of silence." However, "it is hard to comprehend why this literary phenomenon, that is a credit to Romanian literature, remains rather singular in Buzdugan's work, and why he never made it as greater-caliber poet."

=== PNȚ and PȚ–L ===
Reelected to the Assembly as one of the PȚ representatives for Bessarabia, Buzdugan focused on agrarian issues such as the liquidation of the zemstva, and defended the latter as tools of peasants' self-management. He and Halippa were also asked to respond in the Assembly about how they had carried out the land reform. He fought over the matter with Alexandru C. Constantinescu of the National Liberals, but also with more radical Bessarabian agrarianists such as Ludovic Dauș. His other focus was Romania's defense against a hostile Soviet Union, which had not recognized Bessarabia as part of Romania. His speeches applauded by all political camps, Buzdugan depicted Romania as a bastion of Christendom and Western civilization. Unlike other PȚ deputies, he did not see Romania's social backwardness as an impediment, and suggested that making Romanians "healthy and strong" would ensure that the country fulfilled her cultural mission. Documenting the Comintern links of the Romanian Communist Party, he also suggested that the PȚ itself was being infiltrated by the Krestintern. In December 1924, Buzdugan had a public row with Artur Văitoianu, Minister of Transport in the new Brătianu cabinet—at stake was the issue of the state railways, which Buzdugan deemed unfit for an imminent war with the Soviets.

His later speeches about Bessarabian unionism "universally ignored", Buzdugan continued to point out cases of abuse and corruption in his native region, protesting against the sentencing by a court-martial of his fellow deputy Gheorghe Zbornea, and warning that such displays weakened anti-communism in the region. His conflict with the Brătianu government became acute, with Buzdugan fully supporting Stere, who was sidelined by the majority deputies: reportedly, the poet-politician Goga threatened Buzdugan with a revolver during the session of May 4, 1925. On May 17, he took part in the opposition congress at Dacia Hall, alongside Peasantist and Democratic Nationalist figures, with Communist Party men present in the audience. This meeting was broken up by the army, and Buzdugan, although defended by Iorga, found himself stripped of his deputy's seat on May 19.

Buzdugan followed Halippa and Pelivan into National Peasants' Party (PNȚ), formed from the PȚ's merger with the Romanian National Party. Reelected in June 1926, he became noted for his antisemitic outbursts, taking the rostrum to address the issue of anti-Jewish disturbances at Cernăuți. Scholar Irina Livezeanu describes Buzdugan's speech as one "studded with anti-Semitic buzzwords" and "racist commonplaces". He accused the Jews of provoking vague acts of violence to "harm Romania"; however, taking sides with the National-Christian Defense League students, he warned that the Jews could expect pogroms to occur. In February 1927, he defected to the Peasants' Party–Lupu (PȚ–L), serving on its executive committee alongside figures such as Nicolae L. Lupu and Ioan Pangal.

During the 10th anniversary of the Bessarabian union, Buzdugan showed himself optimistic about the prospects of the region, against Halippa and Ioncu, who shared a bleaker outlook. In November 1928, at another festive meeting of the former Sfatul deputies, he clashed with Stere, who demanded that a resolution be adopted in support of "people's liberties", and against the "exceptional laws". Buzdugan reproached Stere: "So you came here for politicking." In his new term in the Assembly after the 1928 election, he took a position against Bessarabian autonomism, describing it as a "Russian formula" and a "worrisome" threat. Buzdugan also questioned the PNȚ government over its alleged tolerance of communist and pro-Soviet activities in Bessarabia. Nevertheless, he endorsed decentralization of the lesser government bodies, "for it won't do that someone should have to travel back and forth from Bessarabia to Bucharest".

=== Iorga cabinet and Romanian Front ===
Buzdugan was active with Pântea within the Union of Reserve Officers, which collaborated with the Siguranța agency in combating communism, "finding out and unmasking those who carried out revolutionary propaganda"; a rough equivalent of the old regime's gentry assembly, it also demanded pay raises for Bessarabians in the military. In 1930, he sided with the nationalist groups in the Assembly against the PNȚ government, which had promised to ethnic Bulgarians to enact a liberal land law in Southern Dobruja, thus limiting Romanian colonization attempts. As noted by Iorga, Buzdugan, "babbling as usual", attacked the Dobrujan Bulgarian deputies as proxies of the Bulgarian Tsardom. Buzdugan also had a verbal bout with Lucrețiu Pătrășcanu of the far-left Peasant Workers' Bloc, calling him "a parasite of the working class".

Co-opted by Iorga during his technocratic administration of 1931–1932, he served as Undersecretary of State in the Ministry of Commerce and Industry. As Iorga recounts, Buzdugan and Vladimir Cristi were imposed on him by a Bessarabian "bloc" of deputies, "who wished to have their representative in Government"—this was against rumors that he was personally close to Buzdugan and intended to make him his son-in-law. In order to join the government in January 1932, Buzdugan quarrelled with Lupu and the PȚ–L, who remained in the opposition. He also defeated Pântea for the position, although the latter was a favorite of the new king, Carol II. Buzdugan depicted Pântea as an unreliable former Bolshevik, and also as a pawn of the National Liberals. At the time, Pamfil Șeicaru and Curentul daily mounted a campaign against Buzdugan, alleging that he had illegally pocketed money from the industrial concern in Bălți. He responded by suing Șeicaru.

By May 1932, Buzdugan had been singled out by Carol II as one of the "ridiculous" government members whom Iorga was ordered to replace; he handed in his resignation "dignified, without any expectations." After Iorga's fall in the elections of 1932, Buzdugan dedicated himself to another calling: supporting anti-Soviet and White émigré circles in Romania. According to the reports of Siguranța spies, he intended to relaunch the Golos Bukharesta, a Russian anti-communist newspaper, and to obtain support for the Whites from the cabinet of Gheorghe Tătărescu. By January 1934, he had joined Iorga's Democratic Nationalists, heading their organization in Bălți County. In 1935, Buzdugan veered to the far-right, joining the PNȚ's "semi-fascist" splinter group, the Romanian Front, and heading its own Bălți County chapter.

After introducing the Romanian public to the Russian avant-garde (with translations that Iorga deems "very good"), Buzdugan focused on the works of Pushkin, publishing in Gândirea a rendition of his "Gypsies" (1935). At the time, scholar Eufrosina Dvoichenko described it as "the best" of several Romanian attempts to translate the poem. In 1937, he produced a new volume of his own poems, Păstori de timpuri ("Time-herders"). A contributor to Halippa's Viața Basarabiei magazine, in 1939 he became a co-founder of the Bessarabian Writers' Society. However, according to sociologist Petru Negură, Buzdugan's verse was entirely backward and irrelevant by 1930: "Just as agriculturalists were facing the devastating effects of the Great Depression, the peasants depicted in poems by Pan Halippa or Ion Buzdugan [...] continued to cultivate their land with love and judiciousness."

Buzdugan escaped Bessarabia following the first Soviet occupation of 1940, while former members of the Union of Reserve Officers, including Emanoil Catelli, were jailed or deported. Reconciling with Inculeț and Pântea, he joined their Bessarabian Circle, an advocacy group based in Bucharest. In 1942, at the height of World War II, his Metanii de luceferi ("Genuflections of the Evening Stars") came out. It was to be his final published work in poetry, although three others exist as manuscripts. During the Soviet push into Bessarabia at the start of 1944, Buzdugan was offered a temporary home in Brezoi, Vâlcea County (southwestern Romania). With the help of Alexandru Leca Morariu, his verse continued to see print in magazines like Gazeta de Transilvania and Revista Bucovinei.

=== Repression and death ===
Even before the official establishment of a Romanian communist regime in 1948, Buzdugan came to the attention of the Soviet occupation forces, which began procedures to arrest or deport him as a political undesirable. In 1945, he was hiding in monastic clothes at Bistrița Monastery, where he met the medical assistant and monk-in-training Valeriu Anania. In his memoirs, Anania describes Buzdugan as a mediocre poet, his Orthodox devotional pieces comparable to Lord's Army hymns, adding: "He grew old with the impression of him being a great poet, and I became awfully sad at the thought that I might grow old with that same impression of myself." According to Anania, Buzdugan also angered the starets with his urban demeanor, and left for Bucharest when "times changed for the better".

From 1948, Buzdugan escaped threats of arrest by hiding in an attic at Blaj, where he was protected by Ioan Suciu, a bishop of the Greek-Catholic Church. When the Church itself was dissolved, he hid in private homes, or dressed up as a traveling monk and sought refuge in monasteries—at Tăuni and Târgu Mureș, later at Bujoreni and Polovragi. In 1950, he had returned to Bucharest, living with his mother, who was in her nineties, and four of his sisters on Vlad Județul Street, Vitan. That year, Buzdugan began writing to the literary critic Perpessicius. The latter arranged for Buzdugan to heal a fractured right arm with help from the poet-doctor Virgiliu Moscovici-Monda. In 1951, commissioned by Perpessicius to translate Eugene Onegin, Buzdugan announced that he was working on his own epic poem, retelling the death of Miron Costin—the latter, if it exists, was never published. In April 1953, he wrote again to announce his "hurried departure" to Bazna, Transylvania, where his sister ran a summer camp. With the onset of de-Stalinization in the Soviet Union, Romanian literati could hope for a more tolerant regime. In this climate, Buzdugan began frequenting a literary circle in the Bucharest home of Ion Larian and Paraschiva Postolache, where he met young writers such as Eugen Barbu and C. D. Zeletin. Other senior guests included Virgil Carianopol, N. Crevedia, and Radu D. Rosetti.

From ca. 1955, when Romanian communism turned increasingly nationalist and anti-Soviet, Buzdugan was allowed a quiet return to publishing, but had to limit himself to translation work. His earlier volumes had been taken out of the public libraries, along with many other books referencing Bessarabia. In 1956, Steaua magazine hosted Buzdugan's version of Pushkin's "To Ovid". Reportedly, he claimed to have authored a translation of Boris Godunov, stolen from him by the regime's poet-laureate, Victor Eftimiu. Using the pseudonym B. I. Alion, he published in 1962 a version of Maxim Gorky's tale, "A Girl and Death". His other contributions were renditions from Blok, Bunin, Kotsiubynsky, Lermontov, Shevchenko, and Yesenin.

Terminally ill with cancer, Buzdugan spent his final months at Filantropia Hospital, where he was visited by C. D. Zeletin, who recorded his memoirs. He died on January 27, 1967, in Bucharest, and was buried at Bellu cemetery. His funeral was attended by Halippa and Pântea, and saw them speaking publicly for the reincorporation of Bessarabia into Romania; reportedly, the speech was tolerated by the authorities, which were allowing non-politicized expressions of nationalist fervor. However, fearing a backlash, several guests left when Pântea began describing Buzdugan's career in politics. Later that year, Buzdugan's Eugene Onegin appeared under his real name, with a foreword by Perpessicius. According to philologist Ioana Pârvulescu, it was a "good translation". The last of his surviving sisters, Eleonora, died in 1995.

Despite the mood of liberalization in the 1950s and '60s, Buzdugan's name was rarely invoked in print before the Romanian Revolution of 1989, and only two new books of literary criticism mentioned his work. In the Moldavian SSR, his name was banned from all reference. This stance changed after 1989. In independent Moldova, his work saw print in anthologies, including Literatura din Basarabia în secolul XX and Poeți din Basarabia. In Romania, Zeletin reprinted Miresme din stepă and published his correspondence; his collected works appeared as 2 volumes, in 2014, at Chișinău. In 2012, the editor had noted that Buzdugan, his friend, "is nonetheless forgotten, [...] even today, when the history of our stolen provinces is being combed through."
