= Coșeni =

Coșeni may refer to:

- Coșeni, a village in Sfântu Gheorghe city, Covasna County, Romania
- Coșeni, a village in Negurenii Vechi commune, Ungheni District, Moldova
