= Gherman Pântea =

Romanian politician and soldier (1894–1968)

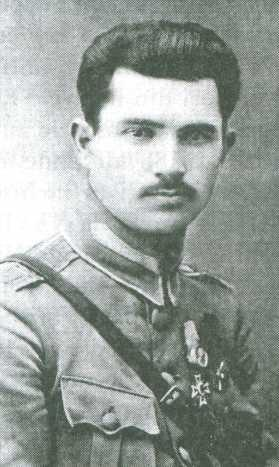
- Pântea in 1918

Mayor of Odesa (Romanian-installed)
- In office 1941–1944
- Preceded by: Y. K. Chernytsa (Soviet)
- Succeeded by: V. P. Davydenko (Soviet)

19th Mayor of Chișinău
- In office 1932–1932
- Preceded by: Constatin Ionescu
- Succeeded by: Dimitrie Bogos
- In office 1927–1928
- Preceded by: Sebastian Teodorescu
- Succeeded by: Ion Negrescu
- In office 1923–1923
- Preceded by: Vasile Bârcă
- Succeeded by: Nicolae Bivol

Personal details
- Born: May 13, 1894 Zăicani, Russian Empire (now Moldova)
- Died: February 1, 1968 (aged 73) Bucharest, Socialist Republic of Romania
- Resting place: Bellu cemetery
- Awards: Order of St. George; Moldavian Order of St. Vladimir

Military service
- Allegiance: Russian Empire; Moldavian Democratic Republic; Kingdom of Romania
- Branch/service: Imperial Russian Army; Bessarabian Army; Romanian Land Forces
- Years of service: 1915–1917; 1917–1919; 1941
- Rank: Podporuchik; Major
- Battles/wars: World War I; World War II; Siege of Odessa

Gherman Vasile Pântea (Romanian pronunciation: [ˈɡerman ˈpɨnte̯a]; surname also spelled Pîntea; Russian: Герман Васильевич Пынтя, romanized: German Vasilyevich Pyntya; Ukrainian: Герман Васильович Пинтя, romanized: Herman Vasylyovich Pyntia; May 13, 1894 – February 1, 1968) was a Bessarabian-born soldier, civil servant and political figure, active in the Russian Empire and Romania. As an officer of the Imperial Russian Army during most of World War I, he helped organize the committees of Bessarabian soldiers, oscillating between loyalty to the Russian Provisional Government and the cause of Bessarabian emancipation. Pântea was subsequently Military Director of the Moldavian Democratic Republic, answering to President Ion Inculeț. He personally created a Bessarabian defense force, tasked with combating Bolshevik subversion and Russian intimidation, but also braced for defeat after the October Revolution.

With some hesitance, Gherman Pântea endorsed the Republic's union with Romania, affiliating with the local Bessarabian Peasants' Party, then with Romania's National Liberals. Having parallel careers as teacher, lawyer and journalist, Pântea remained a presence in Romanian political life, as member of Parliament, negotiator of détente with the Soviet Union, and three times Mayor of Chișinău. He was however mistrusted for his defense of arrested Bolsheviks, his critique of centralized government, and his alleged corruption. During World War II, Pântea was Mayor of Odesa under a Romanian occupation. He intervened to save Jews from the 1941 Odessa massacre and the subsequent deportations to camps in Transnistria. He had a tumultuous relationship with Ion Antonescu, the Romanian dictator, and was kept in check by the occupation authority. His administration managed to set in motion a plan for Odesa, and helped the city overcome devastation through the adoption of free trade, but also created various controversies.

Pântea was long suspected of war crimes, and spent much of his post-war life as a fugitive. He was eventually apprehended, and became a political prisoner of the Romanian communist regime. In 1956, he managed to have the war crimes verdict overturned but, albeit rehabilitated in part, continued to be harassed by the communist apparatus until the 1960s.

== Biography ==
=== Early years and World War I service ===
Much of Gherman Pântea's life remain mysterious, inaccessible to researchers, and, according to historian Ion Constantin, "a permanent crossover of myth and reality." Of ethnic Romanian and lower-middle-class origins, Gherman Pântea was born on May 13, 1894, in the northern Bessarabian village of Zăicani; he was one of several children born to lawyer Vasile Pântea and his wife Ioana. They were of the Eastern Orthodox religion, and Gherman was a practicing Romanian Orthodox until late in life. The boy had trouble adapting himself to the requirements of living in what was then Russia's Bessarabia Governorate: although he was studious and completed primary school with honors, he had difficulty learning the official Russian language. He finished secondary school in Glodeni, before leaving for Akkerman, where he attended Russian normal school and witnessed the start of World War I. He frequently sailed to Odesa, the Black Sea port which was to fascinate him for the rest of his life.

In June 1915, shortly after completing his studies, Pântea was drafted into the Imperial Russian Army, and relocated to Kyiv, where he attended a Junker School. He was again in Odesa, where Bessarabian-born officer Emanoil Catelli was giving standard Romanian language classes to Russian officers, and became close friends with his new teacher. (Some sources represent Pântea as a graduate of Odesa University.) Upon graduation from the Junker School, the young Podporuchik was dispatched to the Romanian front, to function as a translator between the Russian Ninth Army and their colleagues in the Romanian Land Forces. He also fought with valor during battles against the German Army, and twice received the Order of St. George.

Russia's February Revolution caught Pântea entrenched with his men somewhere near the town of Roman. The news, he later wrote, was a wake-up call for the Bessarabian Romanians in foreign lands, since it offered the prospect of self-determination at home. As the Provisional Government took hold of military matters, Pântea became President of the Ninth Army's Soviet, and also helped organize the Bessarabian soldiers into a single political body. Similar actions were being taken by other nationally minded Bessarabian officers. Some—Catelli, Anton Crihan, Constantin Osoianu, Ion Păscăluță, Andrei Scobioală—were active on Bessarabia's borders, while others addressed Bessarabian units in places such as Novorossiya (Elefterie Sinicliu) or Crimea (Grigore Turcuman).

Here was the nucleus for a single military and political unit of the Bessarabian, or "Moldavian", national movement, which sought to gain control of Chișinău (the informal Bessarabian capital). At the time, tensions were sparked between Podporuchik Pântea's Roman organization and the inner-Bessarabian faction which demanded a social revolution, namely the Chișinău Soviet of Workers and Soldiers; he also had to struggle with Bessarabian apathy, communist gains, and territorial claims stated by the neighboring Ukrainian People's Republic. Through Pântea and Scobioală, the Roman group communicated directly with a civilian network formed by the Bessarabian expatriates of Iași, who endorsed the effort to consolidate political unity. On behalf of the Roman leadership, Pântea made a journey to Odesa, where he contacted the eastern committee formed by Catelli and the others (May 1917). At the time, Odesa Bessarabians were forming their "Moldavian Cohorts", armed units which were supposed to challenge the Chișinău Soviet.

=== Moldavian Central Committee ===
Eventually, in June 1917, Gherman Pântea and two other Ninth Army soldiers—Petre Vărzaru, Ion Mitrean—were mandated by their colleagues to leave for Chișinău and organize the national movement locally. The youngest of all activists involved in the project, Pântea was elected head of the resulting Moldavian Central Committee of the Soldiers and Officers' Union. Pântea, Vărzaru and Mitrean benefited from some Russian support, after Commander Alexander Shcherbachov gave them a free pass and an indefinite leave from the Romanian front. However, their Central Committee met a new rival in the parallel Military Revolutionary Committee, formed by revolutionary Russians loyal to the Chișinău Soviet. This authority gave formal backing to its Moldavian equivalent, supporting its struggle for self-determination and even discussing a merger, but discreetly tried to combat Bessarabian Romanian influence in all other fields. A truce was agreed upon between Pântea and the Russian Committee representative Levenzon, which even allowed both organisms to share office space in the same building.

During September, after clashes with some of the radicalized peasants hampered propaganda efforts in the countryside, and Ukrainian or Russian pressures increased, the Moldavian Committee began issuing its own political newspaper. Known as Soldatul Moldovan ("The Moldavian Soldier"), it had poet Gheorghe (Iorgu) Tudor as manager and Pântea as one of three editors. Pântea carried from Iași a large bag of propaganda literature, in Cyrillic letters—Vasile Harea of Cuvânt Moldovenesc paper, who witnessed the event, described Pântea as "a rather affected young man, with a nervous gaze, ambitious and conceiving of all sorts of schemes".

At around the same time, the Moldavian Central Committee took steps to create a Bessarabian national force within Russia's Army, with Vasile Cijevschi as Commander. The request was presented to the Stavka (supreme command of the Russian forces) in Mogilev. It provided an ambiguous response, and Pântea led a delegation to request further clarification. On their way through Kyiv, the Bessarabian envoys chanced upon Romania's own delegates to Russia: Dinu Brătianu and Constantin Iancovescu. The two missions shared a train carriage, and the time they shared prompted Stavka staff to suspect a conspiracy. The Bessarabians tried to mend the situation, and Pântea had interviews with Commander Nikolay Dukhonin and Russian Premier Alexander Kerensky. Pântea later wrote that Kerensky was the most welcoming, allowing the gradual creation of a single Bessarabian army (and even promising to transfer the Odessa 40th Regiment its jurisdiction), but forbidding any unilateral Bessarabian decision on this matter.

Before and after the October Revolution overturned the Provisional Government and brought the Bolshevik (communist) movement to power in Russia, Gherman Pântea played a game of intricate diplomacy. According to Ion Constantin, he was good at seizing political opportunities "in those murky, troubled times, subject to fast and radical changes to the map of East-Central Europe". By early October 1917, Pântea was realizing that Kerensky and the Provisional Government could lose the battle. In a bid to discover the other side's intentions regarding Bessarabia, he traveled to Petrograd and met Bolshevik ideologue Vladimir Lenin. As Pântea later stated, Lenin declared himself for revolutionary self-determination in the national issue—some researchers regard this claim as an urban legend, with which Bessarabian intellectuals tried to convince communists that Lenin himself validated their national aspirations. Returning to Bessarabia, Pântea attended meetings of the Bolshevik club, alongside Ion Buzdugan.

=== Sfatul Țării and Moldavian Directorate ===
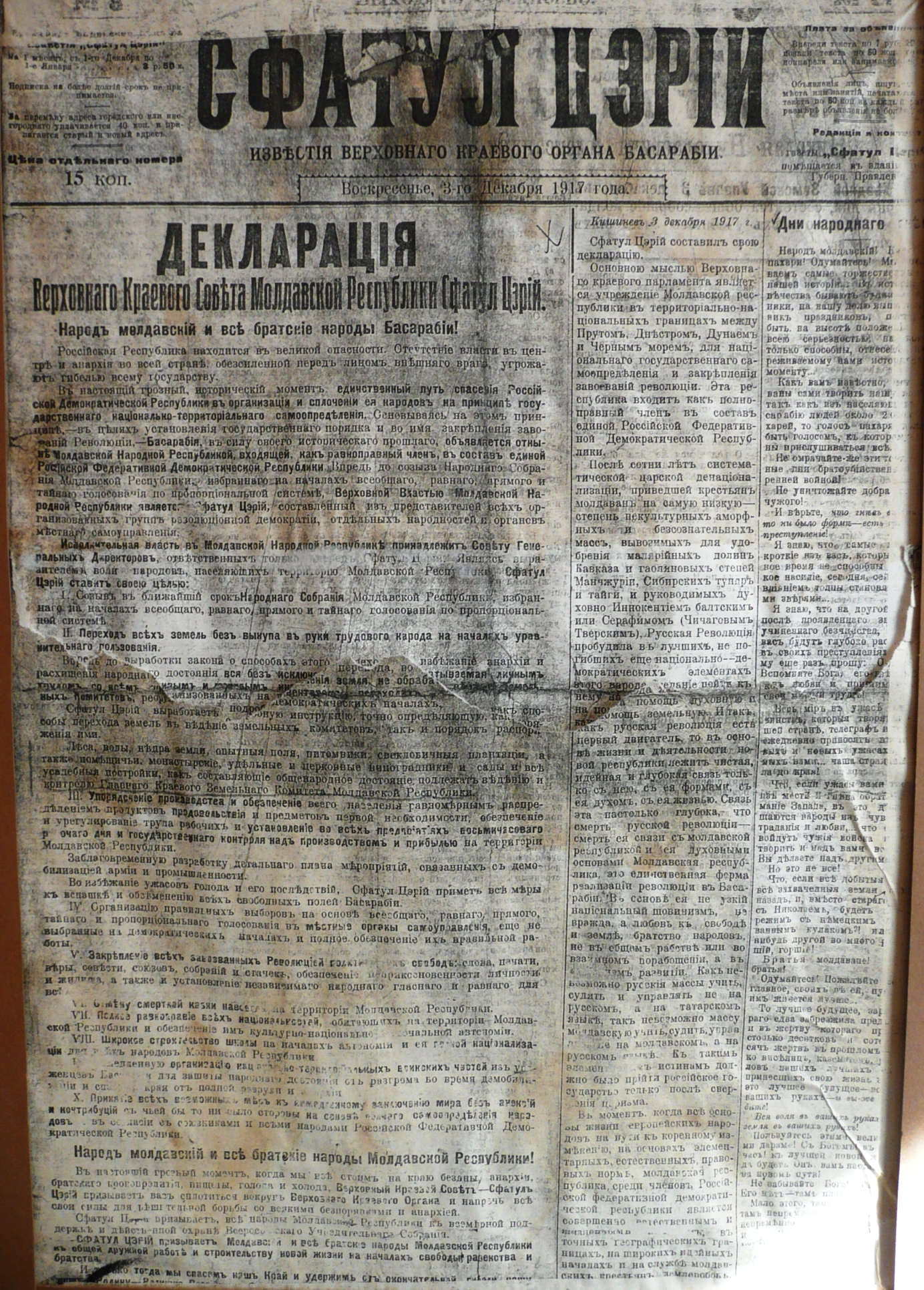
Founding act of the Moldavian Democratic Republic, in Sfatul Țării's eponymous newspaper

Meanwhile, Pântea's Committee organized a Moldavian Soldiers' Congress, which was to form the basis for a Bessarabian legislature, called Sfatul Țării. A dispute endures surrounding the initiative behind this Congress, since both Pântea and Ștefan Holban claimed to have had the idea first. In order to ensure attendance, Pântea (or Holban) appealed to a ruse, circulating a telegram which misleadingly suggested that the Russian Provisional Government was backing the Congress. Within days, Pântea was designated Vice President of the Bessarabian soldiers' assembly; Cijevschi was its president.

Their act of insubordination enraged Kerensky: just before Lenin ousted him from power, the Russian Prime Minister issued a warrant for Pântea's arrest; by then, however, the Bessarabian Congress had been recognized by third parties, from the Mensheviks to the Bundistn. In the confusion that followed Lenin's seizure of power, Pântea still recognized the Russian Constituent Assembly, and presented his candidature in the Russian parliamentary election. He was included on a Bessarabian Peasants' Party (PȚB) list headed by Ion Inculeț and Pantelimon Erhan. The election itself was a chaotic affair, and votes were never officially counted anywhere in Bessarabia.

Once Sfatul Țării came into existence, Pântea was involved in more political maneuvering, helping his colleagues to topple Ion Pelivan, the designated first President of the Assembly. In doing so, Pântea gave approval to the demands of non-Romanian or pro-Russian delegates, who were scandalized by Pelivan's vocal Romanian nationalism. Like Crihan and Buzdugan, and eventually Pelivan himself, he transferred his support to Inculeț, who was widely perceived as a moderate, a loyalist, and a product of the February Revolution. Pântea too was designated a Sfatul Țării member, representing both the Soldiers' Congress and a Bălți Country constituency. His first address, in Russian, spoke about the opportunity for reform, and promised that, under Sfatul Țării, Bessarabia would bloom into "a rose". Pântea was then an active as legislator, serving on the Sfatul Țării Commission for Schooling and the commission for Liquidation. Additionally, he was a delegate to the Congress of Schoolteachers, wherein he recommended teaching Romanian to all Bessarabian schoolchildren. From 1918 to 1925, he edited the Russian-language regional daily Golos.

When Bessarabian deputies created the autonomous Moldavian Democratic Republic, Pântea was integrated on the governing Moldavian Directorate: he had in his care the General Directorate for War and Navy, initially as Locum for Teodor Cojocaru, and then as de facto Director. His main task was the creation of a "Moldavian" armed force, which integrated the previous Cohorts, guarded over the unruly withdrawal of Russian forces, and established friendly contacts with the French Army.

The Director witnessed with growing alarm as some components of his new army were coming under Bolshevik influence. Such was the case of Chișinău Garrison, which was being maneuvered by Ilie Cătărău, a mysterious adventurer and political radical. After Cătărău openly questioned Sfatul Țării authority over his troops, Pântea took a singular measure: together with a rogue unit of Amur Cossacks, he surprised Cătărău on New Year's Eve, arresting and deporting him to Ukraine. Between the two distinct phases of this incident, the Republic's army was sworn in during a ceremony attended by Moldavian President Inculeț.

=== Union with Romania ===
War flag of the Moldavian Democratic Republic, with the initials R.M.

Bolshevik agitation, endorsed from a distance by Lenin's Russian Soviet Republic, peaked over the early days of 1918. The withdrawing Russians were sacking the region, and Bolshevik factions such as Front-Ordel stood to gain the upper hand in Chișinău, Cotiujeni and the Budjak. Pântea instituted a state of emergency, and attempted to introduce more severe sanctions for insubordination. The Bolshevik groups resorted to intimidating acts in the capital, kidnapping some of the Sfatul Țării deputies and attacking the Romanian-organized Volunteer Corps in Russia. In his addresses to Sfatul, Pântea began identifying the Republic's enemy as exclusively "non-Moldavian", but noted that the Bessarabian army behaved "like a flock of rams", with no leadership and morale. On January 9, 1918, the Director was himself a victim of a Bolshevik maneuver, being apprehended by Front-Ordel men and only released, together with soldiers of the Volunteer Corps, when the Bessarabian army intervened in force.

Facing the threats of Russian Civil War expansion into the Republic and communization in his own ranks, Pântea became a major contributor to the accelerated political process of union with Romania. In January 1918, he welcomed the Romanian Land Forces and General Ernest Broșteanu, who had a mandate to reinstate order, and who arrived in Chișinău alongside the French military envoy Henri Mathias Berthelot. There followed a common offensive against the Bolshevik insurgents, part of the larger Western intervention in the Civil War. In the end, the Bolsheviks retreated to Tighina, and the Russian Soviet government broke diplomatic contacts with Romania (see Odesa Soviet Republic).

Later that month, the Moldavian Republic proclaimed itself an independent state, with Daniel Ciugureanu as the new head of government. The administration was reorganized, and Pântea lost his position to Colonel Constantin Brăescu, the Minister of War. President Inculeț compensated for the loss of prestige, raising Gherman Pântea to the rank of Major and making him Knight of the Moldavian Order of St. Vladimir.

By then, Romanian intervention posed a fundamental dilemma, since the political class became undecided about whether to cement Bessarabian statehood or look forward to a union. Inconclusiveness touched the Bessarabian army. Its new uniforms, on the Romanian model, led Bessarabians to assume that it was a branch of the Romanian Land Forces; the monogram R.M., for Republica Moldovenească ("Moldavian Republic"), was commonly misread as standing for "Greater Romania" (România Mare). Pântea himself appeared undecided about the situation, and, in a letter to pro-Russian officer Anatol Popa (later sentenced to death by the Romanian military), argued: "I promise you that I'll be defending republican Bessarabia next to Russia, even if it costs me my life [...]. I gave the order for all the Moldavian army to take action; when it turned out that the Romanians were arriving with too great a force, I changed that order. The Romanians hold on tight [...]. I fear greatly that the Romanians are here to steal away our Bessarabia."

This correspondence remains a problematic aspect of Pântea' career. While some take it to imply double dealing or at least an ideological ambiguity, Ion Constantin suggests that it may have been in fact a ruse. At the time, Romanian authorities were less convinced of Pântea's loyalty. They suspected him of playing the Romanians and the Russians against each other, and subjected him to a formal inquiry. Years later, Pântea referred to Broșteanu's intervention as misguided and sanguinary, because it carried out summary executions of suspected rebels, encouraged denunciations, and stained the unionists' international reputation.

The union was effected on March 27, 1918, when a Sfatul Țării majority voted in favor. The 86 yea votes, which carried the day, included Pântea's. He also voted in favor of a Romanian-wide land reform, an additional condition to the union. Contrary to later Bolshevik allegations, he and the other pro-union voters did not receive land property in exchange for their loyalty.

=== Lawyer, journalist and PNL politician ===
Over the following period, Pântea campaigned internally for further recognition of the assembly's decision, approaching the reluctant communities of Black Sea Germans. In March 1919, he was at Tarutino, where a mass of Germans was persuaded into voting for the Sfatul Țării union resolution. He subsequently accompanied a deputation of Black Sea Germans to Bucharest, capital of Greater Romania, and, with them, was received by King Ferdinand I. His rank in the Bessarabian army was recognized by the Romanian military reserve force, which integrated him as Major.

In April, Pântea was promoted a member of the Central Committee of the PȚB, and Chairman of its club. He was in Romania for a while, taking his license degree from the University of Iași Faculty of Law (September 1919). Later investigation into his career resulted in allegations that Pântea never did attend class, and that his diploma was abusively released by Rector A. C. Cuza (answering the special request of Romanian Premier Ion I. C. Brătianu). Whether or not this is true, Pântea is known to have been enlisted with the Bessarabian bar association as of 1919. Late in the year, he began publishing another Russian-language daily, Bessarabia, which went under in short while and was revived by Vasile Bârcă in 1923. This venture drew suspicions from the Romanian authorities, who organized a search of the premises and, reputedly, uncovered samples of communist propaganda.

Inside the PȚB, Pântea was loyal to Inculeț, and fought against the factions headed by Pan Halippa and Pelivan. He edited the party's Basarabia newspaper, where he launched tirades against Halippa, and again rose to a leadership position after Halippa's expulsion. Pântea followed Inculeț into Romania's National Liberal Party (PNL), and became deputy leader of the group's Bessarabian section. This affiliation got him elected into the Romanian Assembly of Deputies (lower chamber of Parliament), the first of ten consecutive terms. Pântea was nevertheless considered suspect by the Romanian establishment, who believed him a man of left-wing sympathies and a promoter of communist literature. He was attorney for the group of Bessarabian communists, led by Pavel Tcacenco, who had agitated against the Romanian state. The pro bono activity was largely successful: Tcancenco and other three men were found guilt of sedition, and sentenced to death in absentia; 65 detainees were acquitted; 39 others were set free after trial de novo. This implied placing himself against the PNL government, particularly since Pântea reported to the world on the alleged the abuse of power by Romanian administrators in Bessarabia. His intervention in Parliament prompted the Interior Ministry (headed by Nicolae L. Lupu) to sack the leadership of Siguranța police in Chișinău.

In 1922, from Tighina, Gherman Pântea began issuing another Russian daily. Titled Yuzhnaya Bessarabia or Iujnaia Besarabia ("Southern Bessarabia"), it survived until April 1923. He first had a stint as Mayor of Chișinău, beginning and ending in 1923, when he outlined plans to improve education and the urban landscape of peripheral quarters. In October 1923, he was elected one of four Vice Presidents of the Assembly of Deputies, the first of two such assignments he would receive in his career.

=== Diplomatic missions and Georgist dissidence ===
In summer 1923, mandated by Foreign Affairs Minister Ion G. Duca of the PNL, he played a part in negotiations to restore contacts with the Russian government. He was in Paris, meeting with the Romanian communist Christian Rakovsky, who was the Soviet Ambassador to France. They discussed the litigious issue of Bessarabia, which the Bolsheviks still refused to recognize as part of Romania: Pântea was supposed to convince them that the union had been a legitimate affair, and, according to Pântea, Rakovsky showed himself unusually receptive. With a delegation which included Constantin Langa-Rășcanu, Mircea Djuvara, Petru Cazacu, and Anton Crihan, Pântea represented Romania in bilateral talks with a delegation from the Soviet Union, headed by diplomat Nikolay Krestinsky. These negotiations took place in Vienna during late March 1924. In conversation with Krestinsky, Pântea even transmitted the government's offer to renounce claims to the Romanian Treasure in Russia, in exchange for the Soviet recognition of the 1918 union.

Contacts broke down when the Soviets presented their proposal: a plebiscite in the disputed region or, alternatively, Romania's cession of the Budjak. Pântea believed that their uncompromising stance showed the swift radicalization of Soviet foreign policy under new Bolshevik leader Joseph Stalin, who was Rakovsky's enemy. The same year, Tcacenco returned to Romania, instigating the "Tatarbunary Uprising". This rebellion was quashed by the Romanian authorities, and Pântea was again defense attorney for the Bessarabian communist cell.

Pântea also received his second term as Vice President of the Assembly after the 1927 election. He still held the office in 1925, when he took part in debates to extend the scope of Jewish emancipation. To the alarm of antisemitic groups such as the National-Christian Defense League, he assessed that all Bessarabian Jews had the right of naturalization. By then, the former Military Director was also a managerial director for Chișinău's chamber of commerce, and tried to obtain tax reductions for the Bessarabian artisans.

Gherman Pântea returned as Mayor of Chișinău, in office from 1927 to 1928. In 1930, dissatisfied with the PNL and in dispute with Inculeț, he became a member of the dissident National Liberal Party-Brătianu (the "Georgists"). He was notoriously critical of the PNL's party line, alleging that Inculeț had exploited Bessarabia for the Old Kingdom's benefit. Around the same time as Bessarabia marked its first full decade of Romanian rule, Pântea, Buzdugan, Crihan and Catelli were members of the Chișinău Union of Reserve Officers. A rough equivalent of the pre-union Assembly of the Nobility, this association stood out for demanding equal access to Romanian pensions for veterans of the Bessarabian army.

=== Early 1930s ===
The Georgist party failed to register much success, and Pântea left it before the 1931 election; he joined the "National Union" list of incumbent Prime Minister Nicolae Iorga, and was returned to the lower chamber. His third and final mandate as Mayor of Chișinău was in 1932, when he began taking steps to erect a local statue of Ferdinand I. As the region suffered the consequences of the Great Depression, he helped Chișinău's poor, using public funds to buy back their pawned property items. As claimed by his political rivals (including historian Ștefan Ciobanu), Pântea was corrupt and irresponsible in office, pocketing large sums of public money, and partying at Chișinău's expense on a visit to Italy (where he was supposed to reward Pietro Badoglio's support of the Bessarabian union). An anonymous brochure called the mayor a "Rasputin", alleging that he stole public furniture, while an antisemitic city councilor depicted him as "in cahoots" with the Bessarabian Jews.

During those years, Pântea also became an active member of the Bucharest Bessarabian Circle of Nicolae Bosie-Codreanu, which monitored the evolution of Soviet attitudes on Romania. By then, there was a visible rapprochement between the Romania and the Soviet Union, effected by Romania's Foreign Minister Nicolae Titulescu and his PNL faction. The two governments had signed the London Convention for the Definition of Aggression and resumed diplomatic contacts. Renewing his attempts to obtain a definitive Romanian–Soviet agreement on Bessarabia, Pântea had informal talks with Mikhail Ostrovsky, the Soviet Envoy to Bucharest. Pântea preserved the image of a philo-Romanian Ostrovsky, who believed that Stalin would in time accept the union; the initiative, however, came to nothing, as both Ostrovsky and Titulescu were sidelined by their respective governments.

Pântea was also focusing on writing his memoirs of World War I and the union. Some of these texts were originally published by Dreptatea daily in 1931, and were later collected into the book Unirea Basarabiei. Rolul organizațiilor militare moldovenești în actul unirii ("Bessarabia's Union. The Role of Moldavian Military Units in the Act of Union"). A second edition, published in 1932, had a eulogistic foreword by Nicolae Iorga, the historian and political ally; the book also received endorsements from Pântea's former colleagues (Catilli, Cijevschi etc.). Around 1935, Pântea's account was rejected by historian Emanoil Hagi-Moscu and Epoca newspaper, who discussed Pântea's statements of loyalty toward the Russian Republic, and even alleged that the Director had been responsible for the January 1918 attack on the Transylvanian volunteers. With his own version of events supported by Iorga, Pântea sued Hagi-Moscu for slander.

Between 1934 and 1937, when he resumed his activity a lawyer, Pântea sat on Chișinău City Hall's Board of Revision. He reconciled with the PNL, but the party resented his earlier disloyalty: also in 1937, he left the PNL, never to return. In October 1937, he was an honored guest at the festive anniversary of the Moldavian Soldiers' Congress, in Chișinău. That year, he alo published the second volume of his memoirs: Unirea Basarabiei. Două decenii de la autonomia Basarabiei ("Bessarabia's Union. Two Decades since the Bessarabian Autonomy").

=== Carol II's regime and the loss of Bessarabia ===
Pântea witnessed the rise of fascism in Romania, confirmed when the PNL lost the December 1937 election; in those circumstances, King Carol II appointed the far right's Octavian Goga as Premier. The move alarmed the Soviets, and clashed with their popular front policy: according to Pântea, Ambassador Ostrovsky called on him to inform Romanians that Stalin and France's Léon Blum insisted that Goga should be deposed and Romania taken out of "the fascist camp". Pântea maintained that, on its own, Ostrovsky's warning to Carol II resulted in the formation of a new Romanian cabinet, headed by Miron Cristea.

The new regime was an authoritarian one, centered on Carol II, and confirmed by the 1938 Constitution of Romania. Parliament was practically dissolved, but, as a long-time member of the former Assembly, Gherman Pântea was assigned a permanent seat in the reorganized Romanian Senate. Following Carol's administrative restructuring, he was also named counsel at the superior court of Ținutul Nistru. He was at odds with Grigore Cazacliu, the King's Resident (Governor), accusing him of dishonest business practices.

During the first years of World War II, Romania was caught between the hostile governments of Nazi Germany and the Soviet Union (see Molotov–Ribbentrop Pact, Romania in World War II). In that context, the Soviets communicated an ultimatum to Romania, and occupied Bessarabia (June 1940). Pântea and his family escaped to Bucharest, where the refugee politician continued his work with the Bessarabian Circle. Later that year, German pressures resulted in the loss of Northern Transylvania, which confirmed the break-up of Greater Romania. By then, the Bessarabian Circle represented a 120,000-strong refugee community, having Inculeț and Daniel Ciugureanu as Presidents, Bosie-Codreanu and Pântea as Vice Presidents.

The major territorial losses resulted in Carol's fall from power, and inaugurated the National Legionary State, with Ion Antonescu as Conducător. Initially, this regime followed Nazi policy, and prevented the more obvious displays of Bessarabian unionism, leading Pântea to exclaim: "General Antonescu [...] cannot speak his mind on all subjects, so hopefully he would allow us to discuss and to shout out the issue of our justice". In May, shortly after the Antonescu regime had restructured itself (see Legionary Rebellion), Pântea entered a dispute with other members of the Bessarabian Circle, and resigned from the post of Vice President.

=== Odesa massacre ===
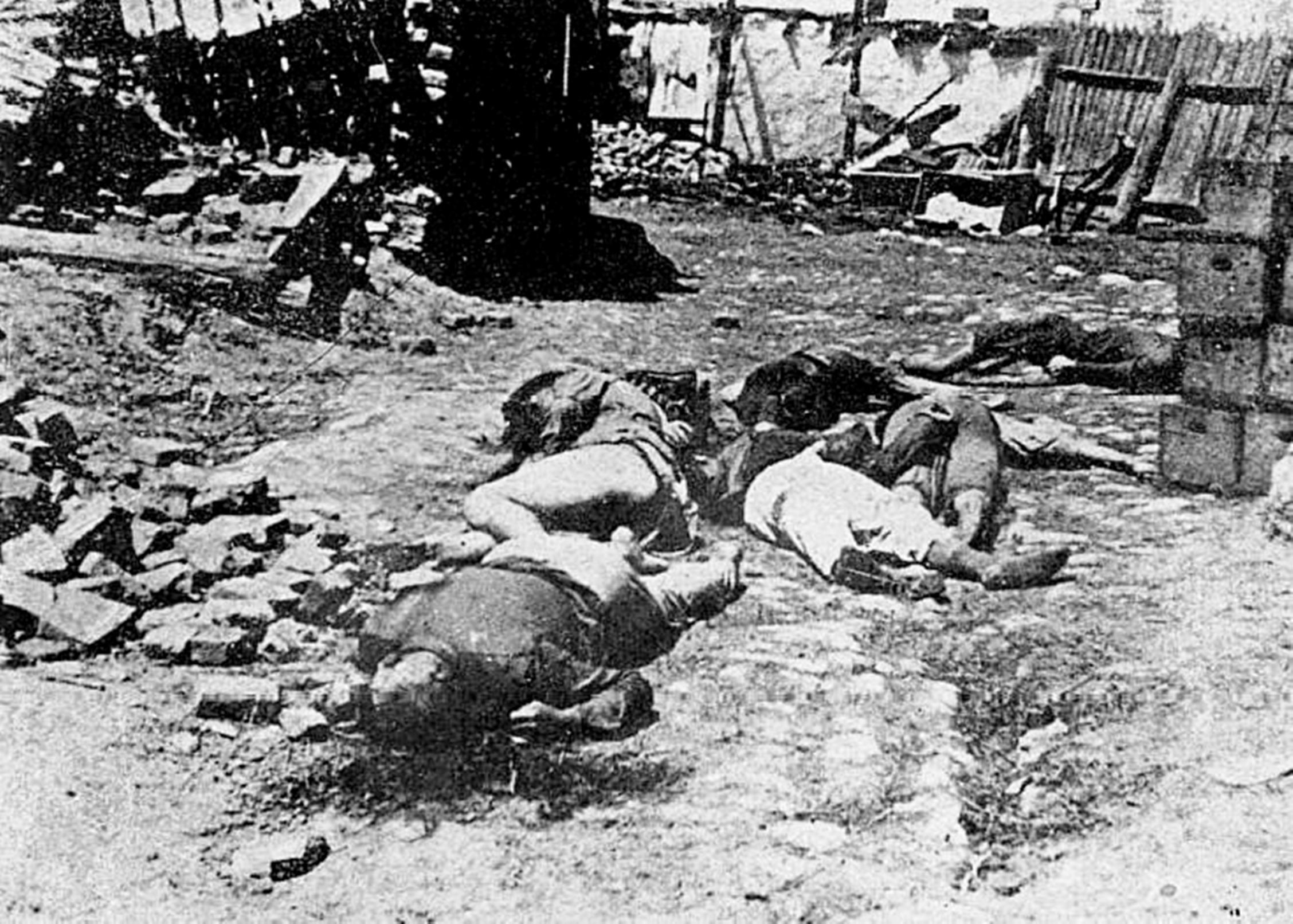
Aftermath of the 1941 Odessa massacre: Jewish deportees killed outside Birzula

On June 22, 1941, a little more than a year into the Soviet occupation of Bessarabia, Romania partook in the surprise attack on Soviet territory as an Axis country. Gherman Pântea was mobilized and dispatched to the Fourth Army, where he was legal adviser to General Nicolae Ciupercă. The latter asked him to review a list of 100 Bessarabian "undesirables", singled out for their left-wing opinions and facing summary execution—Ciupercă wanted his secretary to ensure that no "good Romanians" had been included, but Pântea was able to obtain that the order itself be postponed. Among those rescued as a result of his objection were the communist activists Gheorghe Stere (son of Bessarabian unionist Constantin Stere) and Alexandru Mîță.

The extension of Romanian rule into a new eastern province, carved out under the name of "Transnistria", brought Pântea to high office. As Pântea later noted, Antonescu considered him a suitable Transnistria Governor, but revised his stance when he discovered that Pântea still did not support his policies. Consequently, Pântea was assigned Mayorship of Odesa, taking hold of his seat only after the city's violent siege had been completed. In order to appease the Germans, Odesa was formally kept out of Transnistria, and the Odesa Mayor's office remained separated from those of other Romanian administrators. Among the latter, Transnistrian Governor Gheorghe Alexianu, Gendarmerie commander Constantin Vasiliu and Army General Nicolae Ghineraru regarded Pântea with particular disdain or mistrust.

Instead of condoning the Romanian- and German-led mass murder of Ukrainian and Bessarabian Jews (see Holocaust in Romania), Pântea is credited with having saved many of the potential victims—probably numbering in the thousands. On October 22, 1941, Pântea issued a proclamation in Odesskaya Gazeta, promising a return to normal, and announced freedom and equality between all Odesans. However, this statement was rendered ineffectual by events which occurred on the same day: an explosion on Marazlie Street took the life of General Ioan Glogojeanu and other Romanian officials. The Antonescu regime supposed a terrorist attack, ignoring all accounts according to which the retreating Red Army had mined the location. Reportedly, Pântea and his Transnistrian colleague Nichita Smochină were informed of the mining, and tried to warn their superiors not to enter the Marazile building.

Antonescu's reaction was sanguinary, and a collective blame was placed on the Odesa Jews. The community was decimated during what became known as the "1941 Odessa massacre". As a witness to this slaughter, Pântea noted that 450 Jewish people were hanged on the first day, others were randomly shot, and still others were rounded up, their fate to be determined by General Nicolae Macici. Pântea thereafter worked to persuade Macici that the killing quota imposed by Antonescu was excessive. On October 23, he and Macici asked Governor Alexianu to turn back the column of Jews sent on a death march. They registered only partial success, as some of the deportees returned: according to Pântea, all but 2,000 survived the experience. However, researchers of the events record a much higher death toll. According to them, Romanian troops randomly murdered some 20,000 or 30,000 of those sent on convoys.

The following week, the Mayor contacted socialite Alexandrina Cantacuzino and presented her with a report on the Massacre, which she was to hand over to Antonescu. In assigning blame for the killings, Pântea noted that he himself was not a defender of the Jews, but a man concerned with justice. His document highlighted the acts of "barbarity" and the "un-Romanian" behavior of various officials; Antonescu threatened to have the author shot on the spot, but later ordered an investigation into some cases of abuse.

=== Plan for Odesa ===
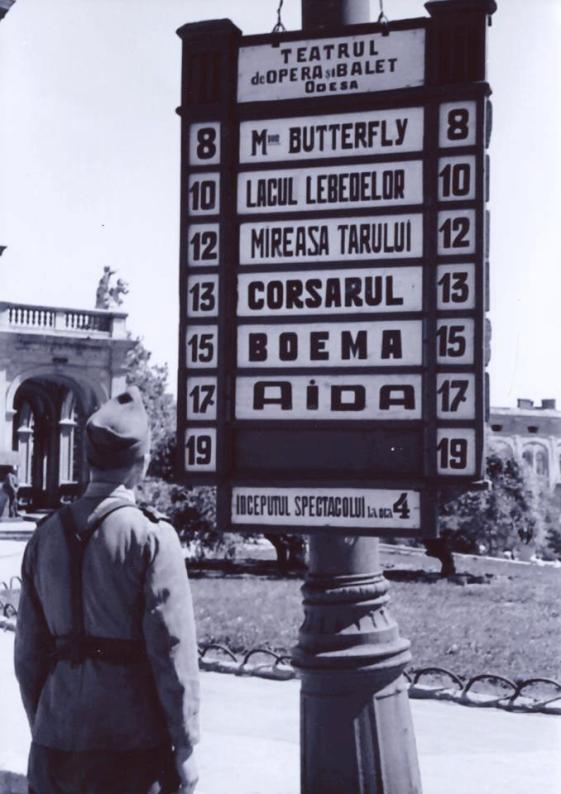
Lamppost with advertisements for coming attractions of Odesa Opera and Ballet Theater and Romanian guard (ca. 1942)

Pântea maintained Odesa a functional metropolis, with adequate food and electricity supplies, and as such, when compared to the rest of Transnistria, city life flourished under most of his mandate. He assigned engineer Lisenko, who had flooded the Odesa power station during the Soviet retreat, to build a new electrical substation; once this began operating, he reopened the Odesa Opera and Ballet Theater, refurbished Odesa University (while building a close relationship with the students), and cleared for use the city's tramway lines. Businesses also reopened, benefiting from free trade and voluntary taxation—the city treasury, Pântea claimed, collected some 170 million Reichsmark in revenue. According to historian Mark Mazower, the experiment was largely carried by corrupt practices, but also gave the Soviet-born Odesans a unique experience of capitalism.

Liberal enterprise coexisted with the minute regulation of social life: in Russia, Pântea's resolutions on this subject are remembered as farcical and unwittingly humorous. One of them limited children's use of bicycles and roller skates, under the pain of court-martial for their parents. The cultural projects he promoted doubled as a propaganda effort: the new authorities staged shows which suggested that Odesa was, and would remain, part of a new Greater Romania. During 1943, he renamed Avchinnikov Street after Octavian Goga, and turned a lodging once visited by Goga into a hotel for Romanian writers on vacation to "Romanian Odesa".

Some of the Russian locals played along, in a bit to ensure cultural survival. Among the latter was actor Vasily Vronsky (Vasile Vronschi), who knew Pântea from Chișinău, and who received permission to establish the Russian-language Vronsky Theater; granted Romanian citizenship, he gave speeches denouncing Soviet agitprop.

During January 1942, there was another planned exodus of Jews from Odesa. Pântea, whose official reports described the claim of "Jewish instigation" as a canard, was reportedly alarmed by the decision. Mostly in vain, he tried persuading Alexianu to reduce the number of Odesa Jews delivered to Berezivka concentration camp—the Mayor hoped to at least obtain the return of Jews who were artisans, teachers or Crimean Karaites. His own membership of the Eviction Bureau remains a contended issue: Pântea categorically denied it (a negation that is backed by Ion Constantin, and reflected in various primary sources); nevertheless, one archive document refers to him as one of ten supervisors of the 1942 deportation. He also took measures against squatting in formerly Jewish houses, but, historian and former Soviet partisan Yitzhak Arad argues, meant to "keep those apartments for the Romanian administration [...] and to sell a certain number of the apartments to turn a profit."

In time, Mayor Pântea found a middle ground between the various political factors, and selected his own administrative team from a mixture of Bessarabian and Soviet clerks. In addition to Vice Mayor Vidrașcu, it included old unionist combatants (Vladimir Chiorescu, Elefterie Sinicliu) and Odesan notabilities (Dr. M. Zaevloshin, architect Vladimir Cundert). Reportedly, City Hall did not exercise political repression against known communists, who were merely required to register on a special list. The Romanian Mayor was also careful to preserve contacts with the two most powerful forces battling each other for control, namely the Germans and the Soviet partisans. His intervention saved the life of Yelena Rudenko, sister of Soviet General Fyodor Tolbukhin, who had fallen severely ill at the family home in Odesa.

Alexianu was especially weary of the Mayor's web of connections. In December 1941, he inquired Pântea about his alleged employment of political suspects, which Pântea categorically denied. In 1942, government embarked on a complex, but erratic, investigation into the presence of former Komsomolists among Odesa's public sector employees. Allegations regarding Pântea's complicity in some acts of corruption prompted additional surveillance from Romanian Special Intelligence. Its subsequent reports accused the Mayor and some in his staff of keeping company with covert communists, and of trading on the black market of Chișinău. Later, sources adverse to Pântea claimed that he was the main beneficiary of trade in Moldovan wine and used goods, and that he had vested interest in aiding the Transnistrian Jews, who were his business partners.

By late 1942, Pântea again irritated the Romanian commandants, when he complained that General Vasiliu had requisitioned Odesa's trolleybuses and moved them to Craiova, in southern Romania. Pântea still tried to enforce his own plans for Odesa's development. In October 1943, on the 2-year anniversary of the occupation, he issued, by means of Molva gazette, a new address to the city's residents, in which he proudly listed his contributions. A few weeks later, he began employing laborers from the neighboring Reichskommissariat Ukraine for a new set of public works in Odesa.

=== 1945 prosecution ===
During January 1944, as the Eastern Front moved closer to Romania, Alexianu's bureaucracy was replaced with a defensive military structure, headed by General Gheorghe Potopeanu. Pântea considered his own position redundant, and asked to be recalled, but Antonescu ordered him to continue with his mandate. He was still at his post when Potopeanu relinquished his command to the Germans, and protested as Potopeanu handed over to the Nazis all property that Romania had confiscated from Soviet citizens. Enmity between the two Romanian administrators was on the rise. According to one account, Potopeanu still remembered that Pântea had tried to sell him a grossly overpriced used car.

During March, Pântea was himself forced to relinquish City Hall property, assigning it to the Germans. After farewell ceremonies at the university and in the factories, he and his wife Lucia left to join the retreating Romanian troops. The Pânteas were in Bucharest during King Michael's Coup (August 23, 1944), with which Romania effectively changed sides in the war by toppling Antonescu. Their house on Argentina Street was damaged in the subsequent Nazi air raid, and the family moved with politician Petre Ghiață, in Colentina. On August 24, Gheorghe Potopeanu, who had emerged as Finance Minister, demanded Pântea's arrest as a potential turncoat; and since the political transition found Pântea included on the transitional regime's list of enemies, it was also assumed that he was one of Antonescu's war criminals.

The post-Antonescu government of Constantin Sănătescu proceeded to include Pântea a revised list of war criminals, even though its Soviet partners still did not describe him as such. When the Red Army entered Bucharest in September, it arrested Potopeanu at his Ministry desk. Meanwhile, Pântea decided to obey the new legislation, and handed down to the state all items of property he had taken on as Mayor. By January 1945, when the Sănătescu list was published, Pântea turned fugitive: for a while, he lived in Craiova, where his brother Constantin resided; later, he was in Sibiu, living under the assumed name of Lozont (or Lozony) Cernescu.

Like Antonescu and Potopeanu, Pântea faced trial in front of the newly created People's Tribunal. In the end, he was acquitted, since Yelena Rudenko and Tolbukhin informed the Romanian state about Pântea's honorable conduct, and since the Allied Commission recommended his release. Pântea was arrested on several other occasions, but, singularly among Romanians prosecuted for war crimes, he was acquitted each time. Although his rivals in the Transnistrian administration were by then destroying evidence of his more positive role in the affairs of state, Pântea preserved certified copies as a precautionary measure.

=== Communist sentencing and rehabilitation ===
In 1947, Ilie Cătărău vindicated his 1918 deportation on Pântea's orders, and began circulating serious allegations against his rival. Published in the Romanian press, these resulted in a national manhunt for Pântea. Fearing a political retribution, the latter made himself lost in Sibiu, where he lived with false papers until December 1949. He was making short visits to Bucharest with forged identity papers and the alias George Mincu, and kept contacts with Anton Crihan, who was preparing for a defection to Yugoslavia.

Meanwhile, Soviet occupation gave way to a satellite Romanian communist regime. Pântea was tracked down by famed Commissar Eugen Alimănescu and handed down to the Securitate (that is, the communist secret police). He was interrogated by Securitate commandant Alexandru Nicolschi, and confronted with allegations made against him by Gheorghe Stere and Alexandru Mîță, whose lives Pântea had helped save. Pântea was sent to Jilava Prison, and kept without trial for three years; in late 1952, a Military Tribunal sentenced him to a further 10-years hard labor, as a "war criminal" and "enemy of the working class". His first year after the verdict was spent under heavy regime, at Aiud Prison, but Pântea was later moved into other infamously tough detention facilities: Gherla Prison and Ocnele Mari Prison. In November 1954, he was dispatched to a milder prison, at Craiova, and then sent to Poarta Albă, a labor camp on the Danube–Black Sea Canal.

In October 1955, Gherman Pântea was included in an amnesty decreed by the Romanian communist authorities, as the early sign of a reluctant liberalization. In January of the next year, he was even partially rehabilitated during a trial de novo for some 800 sentenced war criminals. After gathering evidence and testimonials from Soviet nationals, he took his case to the Supreme Tribunal, which concluded that his sentencing as a "war criminal" was illegal (while finding little evidence that his were crimes "against the working class"). However, the Securitate still kept a file on Pântea, keeping him and his family under constant surveillance. At a time when repression was organized against the Bessarabian refugees, its staff gathered data according to which Pântea was capable of organizing Bessarabian resistance in Romania-proper. With noted help from the Soviet KGB and a female Soviet envoy (codenamed Valeria), the secret police began re-investigating Pântea's various activities in politics. The Securitate archives also show that Securitate men approached the former Bessarabian Director with an offer to become their informant, but register Pântea's blunt refusal, even after intimidation.

=== Final years and death ===
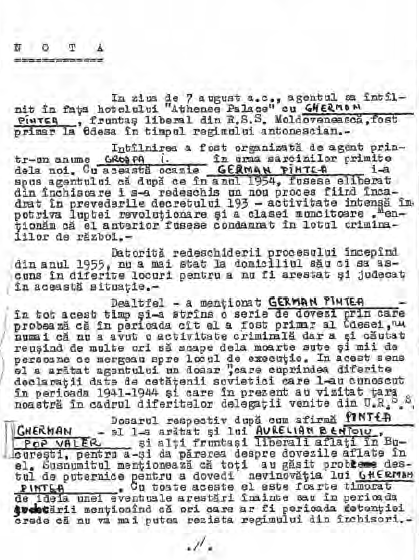
Report by a Securitate informant, concerning a meeting between Pântea and Aurelian Bentoiu (1956)

Communist harassment continued over the following years. After the Hungarian Revolution of 1956, the Securitate kept close watch on Pântea's reaction, reporting about his anti-communism, his contacts with the exiled Crihan or underground PNL-ists such as Aurelian Bentoiu, and his hopes for an American intervention. Consequently, through a decision signed by Nicolschi in 1960, he and his wife were stripped of their pensions. Officially, the Pânteas stood accused of illegally trading in gold coins; a brutal police inquiry followed, and Lucia Pântea's arm was fractured in the process, but the prosecution was stopped in its tracks by the Great National Assembly. Gherman and brother Constantin were again picked up in April 1961, and detained in the prison of Craiova together with other 5 "reactionary elements" from Bessarabia—in 1962, all were sentenced to 1 year in jail.

Around 1964, as Romania embraced (nominally anti-Soviet) national communism, Pântea began hoping that communist censorship would revisit the Bessarabian dispute from a traditional viewpoint. In this context, he corresponded with official historian Andrei Oțetea, praising his "courage and clarity" in exposing the hidden side of Marxist historiography. He himself began writing new memoirs for the Bucharest Institute of History, and, on May Day 1965, began receiving a state pension honoring his "outstanding contributions in service to the working class during the years 1919–1926". By 1967, Pântea made a final return to the public sphere, openly restating his version of historical events. He spoke on the subject at the funeral of fellow Bessarabian refugee Ion Buzdugan, at the parastas of Gurie Grosu, and again at a commemoration for Alexe Mateevici, reportedly causing panic among his public (most of whom were by then the survivors of communist jails). The Pântea family moved back to Bucharest, at the old home on Argentina Street.

Gherman Pântea died on February 1, 1968, in unusual circumstances: he had been absent from home for almost two days, and the family was informed that he had collapsed in the street, minutes after being spotted at a Piața Amzei diner; medical investigation showed that he was not suffering from any life-threatening condition. The funeral was at Bucharest's Bellu Cemetery, on February 4. The ceremony, which included an Orthodox service by priest Vasile Țepordei, doubled as a low-key political rally: it brought together the community of Bessarabian refugees, who regarded Pântea as their hero, and was closely monitored by the Securitate. The funeral orations were delivered by, among others, Father Țepordei, Sinicliu, and his 1921 rival, Halippa.

== Legacy ==
Gherman Pântea is briefly mentioned in For Soviet Power, a 1953 war novel by Soviet author Valentin Kataev. Here, in keeping up with Soviet historiography of the late Stalin period, he is mainly depicted as a criminal figure who takes absurd decisions. In contrast, the Bessarabian folklorist Tatiana Gălușcă-Crâșmaru composed the 1968 poem Lui Gh. Pântea, vechi luptător ("To Gh. Pântea, and Old Combatant"), which depicts the Moldavian Republic's Director as a hero of the entire Romanian people. Between these images is one proposed by the Bessarabian expatriate and Romanian historian Alexandru I. Gonța, according to whom Pântea is a relevant but second-rate figure in the history of Bessarabian unionism (this view, first made public in 1973, is hotly contested by other authors and activists).

After the Romanian Revolution of 1989, as Romania's participation in the Holocaust was being acknowledged, various commentators contrasted Gherman Pântea's behavior with that of other Transnistria administrators. According to Romanian-born Israeli historian Jean Ancel, Pântea's protest against Antonescu's orders is compatible with the work of his Cernăuți colleague Traian Popovici, known for defending Bukovina Jews from planned extermination. In 2008, a similar point was made by writer Boris Marian in the Jewish community magazine Realitatea Evreiască: "The Romanian Mayor of Odesa was shocked by the cruelty with which the orders coming in from Bucharest were being executed. His name was Gherman Pântea and he was a normal man. Like Mayor Traian Popovici of Cernăuți, Gh. Pântea wished above all to fulfill his duty as a human being."

On the 2011 commemoration of the Odessa massacre, Romanian filmmaker Florin Iepan produced the documentary Odessa, which gives evidence about the scale of murder. In an earlier interview, Iepan mentioned that Pântea was "an interesting character" and "a rather luminous figure in that context of bitterness and violence." During debates with the public, held after the film's release, Iepan also quoted Pântea's report to Antonescu as proof that some Romanian officials knew about (and, in this case, deplored) the killings in the city.

However, Pântea's own testimonies on the Holocaust subject have various ambiguities and omissions. Mark Mazower notes that, in writing his reports, Pântea never realized the level of Antonescu's involvement in the 1941 Massacre. Before the official recognition of Holocaust crimes, the Odesa mayor's accounts were being cited against themselves by those who tried to minimize Romanian involvement. In reaction, Jewish community historian Teodor Wexler argued that the attempt was missing its target: "Gherman Pântea's letter [is] of an unrestrained tragicalness", confirming "once and for all the historical responsibility of those who dictated the undertaking of the Holocaust in Romania."

Following the dissolution of the Soviet Union in 1991, most of Bessarabia returned to independence, as the Republic of Moldova. As of that moment, Pântea's name continues to be a subject of contention in the debates over Moldovan nationhood: a hero to the pro-unionists, he is largely ignored by the Moldovenists. This was noted in 2010 by unionist politician Mircea Druc, who assessed that, other than a commemorative plaque in Chișinău, there was little left to attest Pântea's significance to the Moldovan Republic. Nicolae Costin, who was Mayor of Chișinău between 1990 and 1994, reportedly sought to revive Pântea's urban projects (continued, after another long hiatus, by Dorin Chirtoacă).
