= Eșanu =

Eșanu is a Romanian surname. Notable people with the surname include:

- Andrei Eșanu (born 1948), Moldovan historian
- Mihai Eșanu, Romanian footballer
- Nicușor Eșanu (born 1954), Romanian sprint canoer
- Otilia Ruicu-Eșanu (born 1978), Romanian sprint runner
