= Commission for the Study of the Communist Dictatorship in Moldova =

The Commission for the Study and Evaluation of the Communist Totalitarian Regime of the Republic of Moldova (Romanian: Comisia pentru studierea şi aprecierea regimului comunist totalitar din Republica Moldova) was a commission instituted in Moldova by Acting President of Moldova Mihai Ghimpu to investigate the Moldavian SSR, the state which administered the country as a Soviet Socialist Republic from 1940 to 1991, and provide a comprehensive report with the purpose of condemnation of Marxism-Leninism as experienced by Moldovan people.

== Formation ==
On January 14, 2010, Moldova's Acting President, Speaker Mihai Ghimpu, decreed to set up the "Commission for the Study and Evaluation of the Totalitarian Communist Regime in the Republic of Moldova". The commission aimed at studying the claims about crimes of Soviet regime in the former Moldavian SSR from 1940 to 1991, as well as the period before 1940 when the country was an autonomous republic within the Ukrainian SSR. The commission was mandated to deliver a report by June 1, 2010, and subsequently to publish several volumes of documents on the main aspects related to crimes in Soviet Moldavia as well as to other human rights infringements.

The commission is headed by historian Gheorghe E. Cojocaru, the vice presidents are Igor Cașu and Sergiu Musteață, and the secretary being Mihail Taşcă. Igor Cașu contributed to the Presidential Commission for the Study of the Communist Dictatorship in Romania.

The presidential decree no. 165 was issued according to resolutions 1096/1996 and 1481/2006 of the Parliamentary Assembly of the Council of Europe and Art. 94 of the Constitution of Moldova (1994).

A few days after the presidential decree was issued, Vladimir Tismăneanu wrote:

The press release on the establishment of the Commission for the study and evaluation the Moldovan Communist dictatorship is undoubtedly a historic moment. Interim President Mihai Ghimpu gesture proves vision, morality and political will. Official condemnation of the communist dictatorship as illegitimate and criminal became inevitable. In Moldova, anti-communism is not an illusion anymore. As well as in Romania or in other states where the Bolshevik recipe of destruction of human liberties has been applied.

== Members ==
The members of the commission are:

1. linguist Vasile Bahnaru,
2. writer Vladimir Beșleagă,
3. lawyer Ion Casian,
4. economist Sergiu Chircă,
5. political scientist Lilia Crudu,
6. historian Andrei Cușco,
7. historian Demir Dragnev,
8. historian Nicolae Enciu,
9. historian Andrei Eșanu,
10. political scientist Victor Juc,
11. historian Alexandru Moșanu,
12. historian Gheorghe Negru,
13. sociologist Petru Negură,
14. historian Viorica Olaru-Cemîrtan,
15. historian Gheorghe Palade,
16. historian Pavel Parasca,
17. historian Anatol Petrencu,
18. historian Elena Postică,
19. philosophe Ion Sîrbu,
20. jurist Andrei Smochină,
21. historian Veaceslav Stăvilă,
22. historian Igor Șarov,
23. historian Ion Șișcanu,
24. historian Ludmila Tihonov,
25. historian Octavian Țicu,
26. historian Ion Varta

== Activity ==
The commission is formed of 30 members, comprising doctors in history, sociology, philology, economics, philosophy and law. The commission will study and analyze the 1917-1991 period of the communist regime. The activity of the Party of Communists of the Republic of Moldova from 2001 to 2009 will be not covered by the report unless it is proved that it continued some practices of the former Communist Party of Moldova. According to its Statute adopted in 2008, article 1, the Party of Communists of the Republic of Moldova is a "lawful successor and heir of the Communist Party of [Soviet] Moldavia both in terms of ideas and traditions".

The Commission for the Study and Evaluation of the Communist Totalitarian Regime in Moldova met in its first session on January 17, when there were created 7 workgroups in order to study the documents and the materials regarding the activity of the main institutions involved in the establishment and perpetuating the communist totalitarian regime in Moldova.

== Final report ==
The commission was presented its report to the President on 2 July 2010.
