= Yisroel Avrohom Portugal =

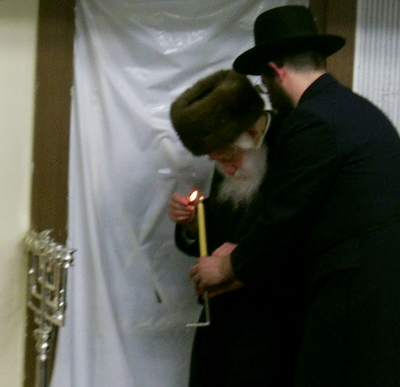
- Rabbi Yisroel Avrohom Portugal lighting Hanukkah lights

Personal life
- Born: June 2, 1923 Sculeni, Moldova
- Died: April 1, 2019 (aged 95) Johns Hopkins Hospital, Brooklyn, New York
- Spouse: Reizel Kahana Stern
- Children: 5 sons, 3 daughters
- Notable work: Composer of Hasidic songs
- Occupation: Rebbe of Skulen

Religious life
- Religion: Judaism

Rabbi Yisroel Avrohom Portugal (or Israel Abraham Portugal) (June 2, 1923 – April 1, 2019) son of Rabbi Eliezer Zusia, was the Rebbe (Grand Rabbi) of Skulen in Brooklyn, New York. He was the last Holocaust era Rebbe to lead a Hasidic dynasty.

== Early years, education, and World War II ==
Rabbi Portugal was born June 2, 1923, to Eliezer Zusia and his first wife Sheina Rachel in Sculeni, Moldova, a town near the Romanian border. In his youth, he studied in Vizhnitz under the Vizhnitzer Rebbe, Rabbi Eliezer Hager. Before World War II began, Portugal and his father left their hometown of Sculeni in Moldova (the town from which derives the name of the Hasidic dynasty that they led) and went to Chernowitz in Ukraine, where they spent the Second World War.

== Soviet occupation ==
Rabbi Portugal and his father, Rabbi Eliezer Zusia Portugal, rescued and cared for more than 300 Jewish children orphaned by the German effort to exterminate the Jews of Europe. They eventually settled with many of them in Bucharest, Romania. The senior Portugal was arrested several times by the Soviets, who ruled Romania until 1968. In April 1959 the Communist authorities jailed father and son for five months on charges of teaching Torah and smuggling children into Israel. Some reports said the two were tortured. Outraged, prominent American Jews, including Rabbi Menachem Mendel Schneerson, Rabbi Eliezer Silver of Ohio, successfully prevailed on Dag Hammarskjöld, the United Nations secretary general, to intervene, and the Portugals were freed. They were released in September 1959, and arrived in the U.S. in August 1960 after the U.S. State Department offered them U.S. citizenship.

== Brooklyn ==
Rabbi Portugal lived primarily in the Borough Park section of Brooklyn but spent some time including about half of the Jewish holidays in Williamsburg, Brooklyn where his father lived. He was widely sought after for his blessings and advice. He deprived himself of bodily pleasures by sleeping very little, not sleeping in a bed and eating no more than one meal a day. He was also known for his battles against modernities such as watching television and use of internet.

He encouraged shaving the scalp except for boys under three and unmarried girls.

He was a composer of Hasidic songs. He always (except on Shabbat and Jewish Holidays) carried with him a small tape recorder to record any new tune that would come to his mind. He composed thousands of songs. Most of them were forgotten after they were recorded, but many of them were sung at his tishen, and a handful of them have become classics in the Hasidic community.

Rabbi Portugal had close ties with many Hasidic rebbes. He headed the ''Chesed L'Avraham'' charity organization in Israel founded by his father, and was actively involved - traveling worldwide - in fundraising for it.

Following the death of his wife, Reizel (daughter of Rabbi Menachem Ze'ev Stern of Oberwischau), in 2005, he changed some of his practices, including traveling less and wearing his peyos hanging down rather than tied around his ears.

== Family ==
Portugal's wife, Reizel, died in 2005. Portugal had five sons and three daughters.

=== Sons ===
- Rabbi Yeshaya Yaakov Portugal, Skulener Rebbe Ztz"l in Boro Park, used to live in Montreal, Canada – oldest son of Rabbi Yisroel Avrohom Portugal. Always had many followers of his own, he died on September 7, 2024, just 5 years after taking over his father.
- Rabbi Meir Portugal – second son of Rabbi Yisroel Avrohom Portugal, Skulener Rebbe of Williamsburg, Brooklyn.
- Rabbi Ephraim Chayyim Yehuda Portugal, Skulener Rebbe Shlit"a in Monsey, New York – third son of Rabbi Yisroel Avrohom Portugal.
- Rabbi Zvi Noach Portugal, Skulener Rebbe Shlit"a in Lakewood, New Jersey – fourth son of Rabbi Yisroel Avrohom Portugal.
- Rabbi Shmuel Mordechai Portugal – youngest child of Rabbi Yisroel Avrohom Portugal, and Skulener Rav in Boro Park. Rabbi Shmuel Mordechai married his niece Sheina Rachel Stern (daughter of Rebbetzin Leah Libba, and oldest grandchild of Rabbi Yisroel Avrohom Portugal) in 1990.

=== Daughters ===
- Rebbetzin Leah Libba – Wife of Rabbi Chayyim Dov Stern, Skulener Rav of Bnei Brak, son of Rabbi Yitzhak Yehuda Stern of Bielitz .
- Rebbetzin Chaya Sarah – Wife of Rabbi Shimon Yoel Weinberger, Skulener Dayan, son of Rabbi Moshe Dov Weinberger.
- Rebbetzin Nechamah – Wife of Rabbi David Leib Klughaupt, head of Skulener Kollel of Boro Park, son of Rabbi Ya'akov Shlomo Klughaupt, son of Rabbi Levi Yitzhak Klughaupt.

== Death ==
Rebbe Portugal died on April 1, 2019, at about 5:45 PM in Johns Hopkins Hospital surrounded by his family. His funeral the following day as prescribed by Jewish law started in Brooklyn and Monsey and was attended by tens of thousands of people at both sites. The funerary proceedings were marked by a pair of incidents which each caused injury to a NYPD officer; the first in which an officer slipped and had his ankle broken by a hearse which ran over his leg and another where an out of fuel drone crashed down upon a police officer's head. He was buried next to his father at the Viznitz Cemetery in Monsey, New York. The Rebbe was 95.
