= Pavel Parasca =

Moldovan historian

Member of the Commission for the Study of the Communist Dictatorship in Moldova
- In office January 14, 2010 – 2 July 2010

Personal details
- Born: July 8, 1939 (age 87) Brînzenii Vechi
- Died: 28.10.2024 Chisnau Republic of Moldova
- Education: Moldova State University
- Profession: Historian

Pavel Parasca (born 8 July 1939) is a historian from the Republic of Moldova.

== Biography ==
Pavel Parasca was born on 8 July 1939, in Brînzenii Vechi and graduated from the Moldova State University in 1967. Then he worked as redactor for "Enciclopedia RSS Moldovenesti" and teacher in Congo-Brazzaville (1967–1968, 1971–1972). He returned for good in Chişinău, where he had academic positions in the Facultatea de Istorie of Moldova State University, Institutul de Istorie of Academy of Sciences of Moldova, Facultatea de Stiinte Umanistice a ULIM. On June 18, 1989, Parasca Pavel Fiodorovici was a founder of the Association of Historians of Moldova (Romanian: Asociaţia Istoricilor din Republica Moldova); he was director of the association for four years.

Pavel Parasca is a member of the Commission for the Study of the Communist Dictatorship in Moldova. The commission was instituted by the President of Moldova Mihai Ghimpu to investigate the Communist regime and provide a comprehensive report.

== Works ==
- Pavel Parasca, La obarsia Mitropoliei Tarii Moldovei, Chişinău: Prut International, 2002.
