= Sculeni =

- Commune
- Location in Moldova
- Coordinates: 47°19′N 27°38′E
- Country: Moldova
- District: Ungheni District

Population (2014)
  - Total: 4,750
- Time zone: UTC+2 (EET)
  - Summer (DST): UTC+3 (EEST)
- Website: https://ssculeni.wordpress.com/

Sculeni (Yiddish: סקולען, Skulen) is a commune in Ungheni District, Moldova. It is composed of four villages: Blindești, Floreni, Gherman and Sculeni. It sits on the Prut river which separates the Republic of Moldova from the omonimous region of Romania and has a border checkpoint to Romania. Across the Prut is a village also called Sculeni, with the Romanian side of the border checkpoint. At the 1930 census, Sculeni village consisted of three parts: Sculenii-Târg ("Sculenii Market", also known as Sculenii Noi, "New Sculeni") on the left bank of the Prut, and the two parts of Sculenii Vechi ("Old Sculenii", ori Sculeni village), on the right bank and the left, respectively.

== History ==
On 22 February 1821 (O.S.), at the start of the Greek War of Independence, Filiki Eteria leader Alexander Ypsilantis, accompanied by several other Greek officers in Russian service, crossed the Prut river at Sculeni into the Danubian Principalities, two days before proclaiming at Iaşi that he had "the support of a great power" (meaning Russia).

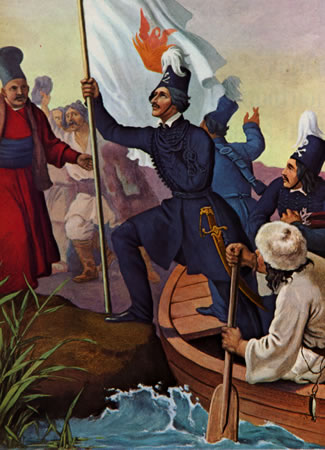
Ypsilantis crossing the Prut at Sculeni on 22 February 1821 (O.S.)

The Battle of Sculeni was fought on 29 June 1821 in Sculeni between Ottoman forces and the Greek revolutionary forces raised by the Filiki Eteria led by Prince George Katakouzenos. It came about as the result of Ottoman reprisals for Ypsilantis' expedition in the two Danubian Principalities.

The Romanian boyar and heir apparent to the Moldavian throne Grigore Mihail Sturdza was born in Sculeni on 23 May [O.S. 11 May] 1821, during the chaos created by the Greek uprising. He was the son of Prince Mihail Sturdza, a scion of Wallachian and Moldavian nobility.

The town had an important Jewish community before World War II. The town is the namesake of the Skulen Hasidic dynasty, as its founder, Eliezer Zusia Portugal, initially served as the town's rabbi. In 26–27 June 1941, some 400 Jews from the area were machine-gunned, half of them women, in what is known as the Sculeni Massacre, in a mass execution by the Romanian Army under the command of Gen. Ion Antonescu - the first major crime perpetrated against the Jews of the Soviet Union during Operation Barbarossa.

== Natives ==
- Mircea Chistruga (1948–2025), film director
- Olga Bogdanova (b. 1951), Soviet and Russian actress
- Andrei Eșanu (b. 1948), historian
- Wincenty (Morari) (b. 1953), cleric of the Russian Orthodox Church, Bishop of Tashkent and Uzbekistan and Metropolitan of Central Asia (since 2011)
- Eliezer Zusia Portugal (1898–1982), rabbi, first Rebbe of Skulen
- Yisroel Avrohom Portugal (1923–2019), Eliezer Zusia's son; rabbi, Rebbe of Skulen in Brooklyn
- Grigore Sturdza (1821–1901), boyar (noble), soldier, politician and adventurer

== Literature ==
Sculeni (battle of Sculeni) is mentioned by Alexander Pushkin in his short story The Shot.

== See also ==
- Battle of Sculeni
- Sculeni, Iaşi
- Skulen (Hasidic dynasty)
