= Eliezer Zusia Portugal =

Bessarabian-born American rabbi (1898–1982)

Eliezer Zusia Portugal (17 October 1898–18 August 1982) was the first Rebbe of Skulen. He was revered by his followers in Russia, Romania, Israel, and the United States for his personal warmth and his care for hundreds of Jewish youth and war orphans, whom he personally adopted as his own children. He established the Skulener dynasty in America in the 1960s. His only biological son, Rabbi Yisroel Avrohom Portugal, succeeded him as Rebbe.

== Rabbi at age 17 ==
Portugal did not become a Hasidic Rebbe until he was well into his sixties. His first public position was as Rabbi of the Bessarabian town of Sculeni (Yiddish: Skulen), his birthplace. He was appointed to this position at the age of 17 after the death of his father, Rabbi Yisroel Avrohom, who was the town's rabbi.

Portugal was successful in his dealings with both young and old community members in Skulen (present-day Moldova) due to his unusual warmth and compassion for others. He was especially effective in reaching Jewish youth, who were rapidly assimilating and throwing off mitzvah observance. Rather than give up on them, he engaged them with love and intellectual discussions about the deeper meaning and importance of Judaism, which convinced many to re-embrace their heritage.

When the Sadigerer Rebbe, Mordechai Sholom Yosef Friedman, visited Skulen and saw Portugal's achievements, he urged him to move to the much larger city of Czernowitz, Bukovina. Although Czernowitz's Jewish population numbered approximately 21,500 Jews out of a total population of 68,400, this city too was suffering rampant assimilation. Together with the nearby Chassidic courts of Sadigura, Vizhnitz and Boyan, the religious Jews of Czernowitz appointed Portugal as their rabbi to help preserve what they could.

During World War II, Portugal resided in Czernowitz. As part of Northern Bukovina, Czernowitz was annexed by the Soviet Union in 1940, then occupied by German and Romanian forces during World War II until the liberation by the Soviet army in April 1944.

== Father of orphans ==
Beginning in 1945, Portugal began adopting dozens of war orphans and caring for hundreds of others. When he was able to move to Bucharest, Romania, he smuggled his "family" in with him and proceeded to adopt even more children, establishing an orphanage for their care. Years later, he wrote in his will that his "children" should show their appreciation to him by remaining loyal to Judaism and studying Torah at every possible moment.

In 1959, Portugal was accused by the Communist government of Romania of spying for Israel and the United States. He was imprisoned together with his only son, Rabbi Yisroel Avrohom Portugal. Mr. Harry Goodman, Rabbi Eliezer Silver and Rabbi Menachem Mendel Schneerson led an international effort to free the Skulener Rebbe and his son. Eventually, through the intervention of United States Department of State, the two were freed in the August of 1959, when they left Romania and arrived in Belgium, eventually immigrating to America in 1960. The Rebbe later said that he chose the United States over Israel so he could better help those who remained in Romania.

The Rebbe settled in Crown Heights and continued his efforts helping the underprivileged. As the Jewish population in Crown Heights began to diminish, his followers left to Boro Park and Williamsburg. However, the Skulener Rebbe remained in Crown Heights in deference to the Lubavitcher Rebbe's requests of the Jewish population to stay. Due to his long schedule of prayer, and the absence of Skulener followers in his proximity, a daily minyan was formed for him in his house with Lubavitcher students. Later on, he moved to Williamsburg.

In 1961, Portugal visited Israel for the first time. He took a side trip to a leftist kibbutz to forgive a Romanian socialist who had been one of his fiercest opponents years before. (That man's descendants became observant Jews.)

When others urged him to open a yeshiva, he responded, "What would my yeshiva add to all the others? A person who wants to do a mitzvah must ask how he can give the most pleasure to God." Instead, in 1962, he inaugurated a network of schools called Chesed L'Avrohom. In Israel, his schools competed with those of the secular leftists for the children of immigrants to that country.

He had a close relationship with Rabbi Shlomo Freifeld. And even led a tish at Rabbi Freifeld's Yeshiva.

In 1970, he met with Senator Henry Jackson in Washington, D.C. to secure his help in the release of Jews from communist countries, which resulted in the Jackson–Vanik amendment.

Portugal authored Noam Eliezer and Kedushas Eliezer, as well as composed many popular Hasidic tunes. He died on 18 August 1982 and was buried in the Vizhnitzer Cemetery in Monsey, New York.
