= Mihail Minciună =

Bessarabian politician (1884–1935)

Member of the Moldovan Parliament
- In office 1917–1918

Personal details
- Born: September 2, 1884 Bogzeşti
- Died: February 4, 1935 (aged 50) Bogzeşti

Mihail Minciună (September 2, 1884 in Bogzeşti – February 4, 1935 in Bogzeşti) was a Bessarabian politician.

He served as Member of the Moldovan Parliament (1917–1918).

== Gallery ==
Moldovan stamp, 1998

== Bibliography ==
- Gheorghe E. Cojocaru, Sfatul Țării: itinerar, Civitas, Chişinău, 1998, ISBN 9975-936-20-2
- Mihai Taşcă, Sfatul Țării şi actualele autorităţi locale, "Timpul de dimineaţă", no. 114 (849), June 27, 2008 (page 16)
