= Zăicani =

- Village
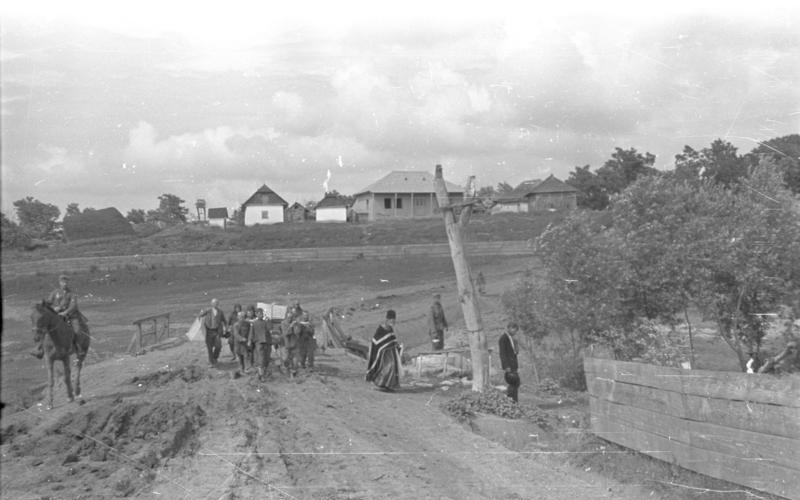
- Zăicani, July 3, 1941

- Location in Moldova
- Coordinates: 47°58′N 27°22′E
- Country: Moldova
- District: Rîșcani District

Population (2014 census)
  - Total: 2,761
- Time zone: UTC+2 (EET)
  - Summer (DST): UTC+3 (EEST)

Zăicani is a village in Rîșcani District, Moldova.

== Notable people ==
- Gherman Pântea
