= Bogzești =

- Commune and village
- Location in Moldova
- Coordinates: 47°25′N 28°26′E
- Country: Moldova
- District: Telenești District

Population (2014 census)
  - Total: 474
- Time zone: UTC+2 (EET)
  - Summer (DST): UTC+3 (EEST)

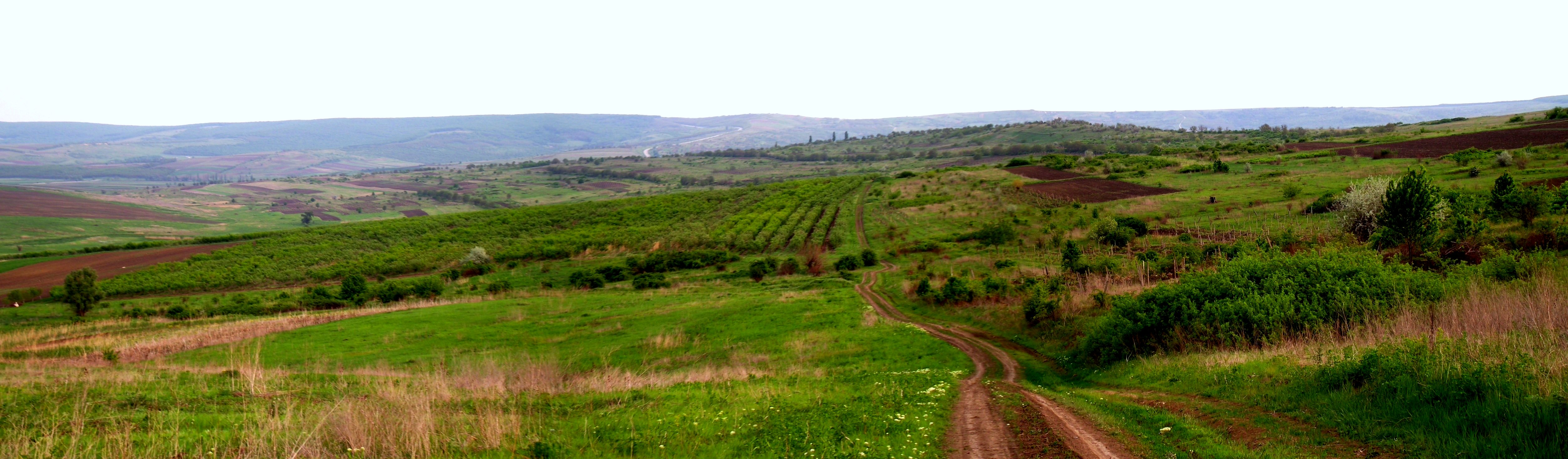
Unnamed Road, Bogzăști, Moldova

Bogzești is a village in Telenești District, Moldova.

== Notable people ==
- Vasile Mândrescu
- Mihail Minciună
