= Sebastian Teodorescu =

Mayor of Chişinău
- In office 1926–1927
- Preceded by: Nicolae Bivol
- Succeeded by: Gherman Pântea

Personal details
- Born: 1 June 1880 Prisaca, Olt County, Kingdom of Romania
- Died: 3 July 1940 (aged 60) Bucharest, Kingdom of Romania

Sebastian Teodorescu (1 June 1880 – 3 July 1940) was a Moldovan politician, mayor of Chișinău between 1926 and 1927, succeeding Nicolae Bivol and before Gherman Pântea's second term.

== Biography ==
Sebastian Teodorescu studied at the University of Bucharest, where he obtained his law degree. Later he worked in various positions: chief of police Tulcea, mayor of Tulcea, Dean of Tulcea Bar.

Teodorescu entered the World War I as a lieutenant. His personal file attests the participation in the battles carried out in: Bulgaria, Transylvania, Bucovina, Muntenia and Mărășești.

In 1918 he arrived in Bessarabia with the first detachments of the Romanian army, and after demobilization he settled permanently in Chisinau, resuming his profession of lawyer.

In 1926, when the first administrative elections took place in Bessarabia, Teodorescu applied for the post of mayor of Chișinău and won the elections becoming the first mayor elected after the Union on 27 March 1918.

== Honours and awards ==
- Order of the Crown of Romania
- Order of the Star of Romania
- Order of Michael the Brave
- National Order of Faithful Service
- Military Virtue Medal
