= Mircea Chistruga =

Moldovan film director (1948–2025)

Mircea Chistruga (6 February 1948 – 22 June 2025) was a Moldovan film director.

== Life and career ==
Chistruga was born in Sculeni on 6 February 1948. He studied at VGIK (1966–1971).

Throughout his career, he directed a number of documentary films, beginning with Soviet Moldova no. 9 in 1969, to Burghiu. Venim și mâine pe aici in 2007.

Chistruga died in Chișinău on 22 June 2025, at the age of 77.
