= Nicolae Bivol =

Bessarabian politician (1882–after 1941)

Member of the Moldovan Parliament
- In office 1917–1918

Mayor of Chișinău
- In office 1923–1924
- Preceded by: Gherman Pântea
- Succeeded by: Vasile Bârcă
- In office 1925–1926
- Preceded by: Vasile Bârcă
- Succeeded by: Sebastian Teodorescu

Personal details
- Born: June 1, 1882 Ialoveni
- Died: after 1941
- Party: National Liberal Party (1922-1926)
- Relations: Petru Bivol (father)
- Education: Imperial University of Dorpat

Nicolae Bivol (1 June 1882 – 3 July 1940) was a Bessarabian politician, member of the Sfatul Țării between 1917 and 1918, and Mayor of Chișinău in two terms between 1923–1924 and 1925–1926.

== Biography ==
=== Early life ===
Bivol was born in Ialoveni. In 1902, he graduated from Chişinău Theological Seminary, where he was a colleague of Teodor Neaga; both would become MPs in the Country Council. He then went on to study at the Imperial University of Dorpat, later becoming a high school teacher in Chișinău. During the First World War he was imprisoned by the Germans, returning to Bessarabia in 1918.

=== Greater Romania ===
On 25 November 1918 he obtained the mandate of an MP in the National Council, being among the deputies who voted the Declaration of 27 November 1918, according to which the conditions on unification of Bessarabia with Romania set on 27 March 1918 were rejected. From 1922 by 1925 he was a member of the National Liberal Party and for nine months between 1923 and 1924, he was the Mayor of Chișinău. He worked as an entrepreneur, owning a tannery between 1922 and 1926, and later, after 1938, a swimming pool.

In 1935, he edited the "Our Life" newspaper in Chișinău.

=== Interaction with the Soviets ===
On 3 August 1940, while in Bessarabia, Bivol was arrested by the NKVD. 54/13 of the Criminal Code of the Ukrainian SSR prohibited proactive fights against the working class and revolutionary activity. However, during the investigations, unexpectedly, some of the workers of the swimming pool and his subordinates from the town hall testified in favor of Nicolae Bivol. They said that he disbursed his employees' wages on time; that he included Soviet newspapers among his reading material; that he treated his employees kindly; and that he even provided additional financial support for some of his employees. They also mentioned the edition of the newspaper "Our Life", describing it as a left-wing and anti-fascist newspaper. Bivol's statement in 1938 of adherence to the Democratic Bloc and signing of a democratic manifesto served as further evidence in his favor.

On 9 November 1940 the preliminary investigation was completed, and the file was sent to Moscow for examination by the "Special troika" and application of punishment, regardless of witnesses statements. The Soviet prosecutors must have liked the statements submitted, and probably the character of the newspaper as well, because on 11 February 1941 the Soviets returned the dossier to Chișinău and arranged the data check; on 5 April 1941 the investigator already received permission from Moscow to have the file closed. Nicolae Bivol was released from prison, and his assets were returned. His was a rare case: only a few deputies in Country Council captured by the NKVD survived.
