= Brînzenii Noi =

- Commune and village
- Location in Moldova
- Coordinates: 47°39′N 28°29′E
- Country: Moldova
- District: Telenești District

Population (2014)
  - Total: 2,650
- Time zone: UTC+2 (EET)
  - Summer (DST): UTC+3 (EEST)

Brînzenii Noi is a commune in Telenești District, Moldova. It is composed of two villages, Brînzenii Noi and Brînzenii Vechi.

== Notable people ==
- Ion Buzdugan
- Pavel Parasca
