= Olga Bogdanova (actress) =

Soviet and Russian actor

- Ольга Богданова
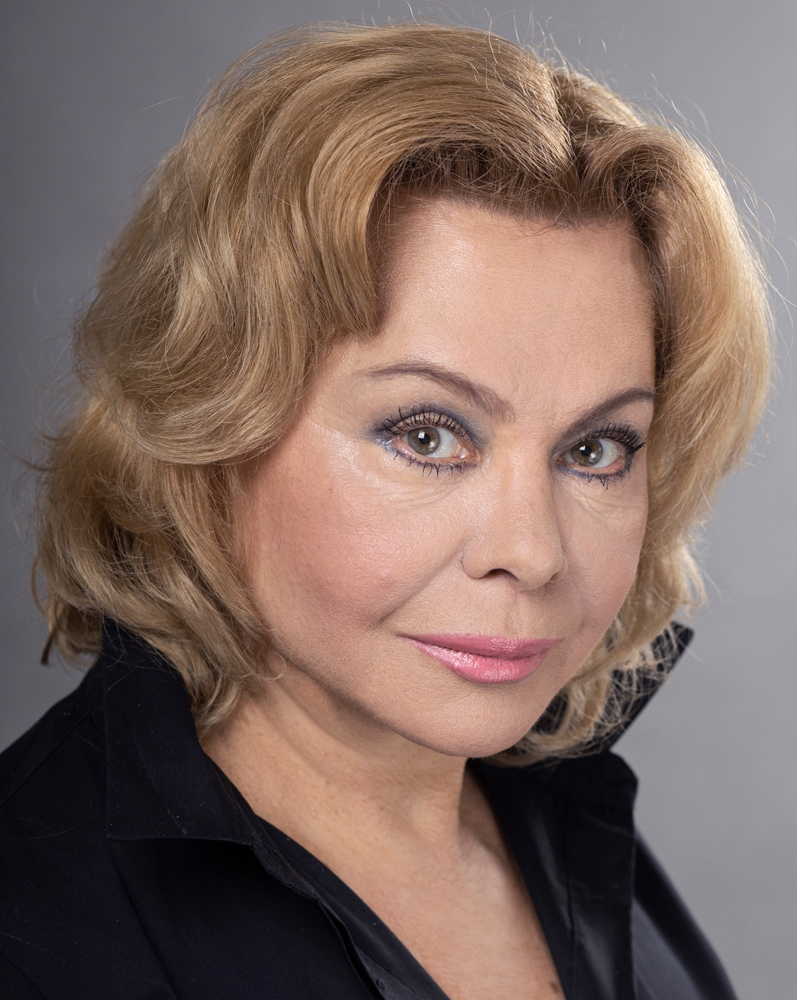
- Born: 7 August 1951 (age 75); Sculeni, Moldavian SSR, USSR
- Citizenship: Soviet Union; Russia
- Occupation: Actress
- Years active: 1971-present

Olga Mikhailovna Bogdanova (Russian: Ольга Михайловна Богданова; born on 7 August 1951) is a Soviet and Russian theater and film actress, actress of the Central Academic Theater of the Russian Army. People's Artist of Russia (1998).

== Biography ==
Olga Bogdanova was born on August 7, 1951, in the village of Sculeni, in Moldavia. She graduated from school with a gold medal, then with a red diploma - the Moscow Art Theater School (workshop of Pavel Massalsky and Alla Tarasova), after which she was accepted into the Sovremennik Theater, where she served for a year. Since 1973 - in the troupe of the Central Theater of the Soviet (Russian) Army, where she works to this day.

While studying in her first year, she starred in Leonid Gaidai's "The Twelve Chairs" in the episodic role of a girl at an auction, which was voiced by another actress.

Since June 2020, together with Stanislav Sadalsky, he has been releasing programs on his YouTube channel.

The leading actress of the theater has been on tour in many hot spots: in Afghanistan, Chechnya, and three times in Chernobyl.

Acts in films, television series, participates in television programs.

== Personal life ==
The first marriage with classmate actor Valery Chemodanov (born 1945) lasted 7 years. The second marriage with actor Alexander Mikhailushin (1943-2010) lasted 22 years and broke up due to his betrayal. The third spouse is Vitaly Bigeev (born 1972), producer. Married for over 20 years.

Have no children.

== Awards and titles ==
- Order of Friendship (December 13, 2011) - for great services in the development of national culture and art, many years of fruitful activity
- Order of Honor (1991)
- Medal "For Strengthening the Combat Commonwealth" (Ministry of Defense of Russia, 2000)
- Medal "For Labor Valor" (Russian Ministry of Defense, 2001)
- Medal "200 years of the Ministry of Defense" (2002)
- Medal "For the Return of Crimea" (2014)
- Honored Artist of the RSFSR (July 12, 1988)
- People's Artist of the Russian Federation (April 24, 1998)
