= Skulen (Hasidic dynasty) =

Hasidic dynasty

Skulen (סקולען) Hasidic Dynasty
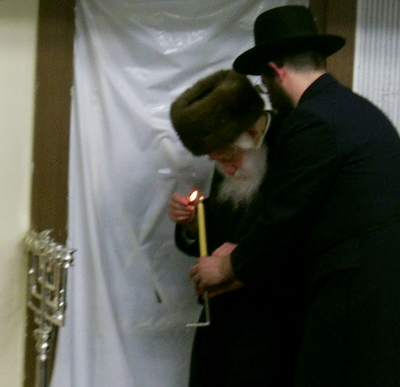
- Rabbi Israel Abraham Portugal, Grand Rebbe of Skulen, lighting Hanukkah candles

Founder
- Rabbi Eliezer Zusia Portugal

Regions with significant populations
- United States, Israel, Canada

Religions
- Hasidic Judaism

Skulen (סקולען) Hasidic dynasty was founded by Eliezer Zusia Portugal. It was headed by his son, Yisroel Avrohom Portugal until his death on April 1, 2019. Its name is from Sculeni (Yiddish: סקולען Skulen), a town in Bessarabia (now in Moldova) where Eliezer Zusia Portugal was born and served as rabbi.

The central Skulener synagogue is in, Boro Park, Brooklyn in New York City.

== History ==
Portugal succeeded his father as rabbi of Skulen at the age of 17 upon his father's death in 1915. In 1960 he and his son Yisroel Avrohom Portugal moved to the United States. He died in 1982.

He was succeeded by his son Yisroel Avrohom Portugal, who was in turn succeeded by his sons.

== Lineage of Skulener Dynasty ==
- Rebbe Yeshayah Shor of Yas - author of K'lil Tiferes - disciple of Rebbe Mordechai of Kremnitz (Kremenets) - son of the Maggid of Zlotshov.
  - Rebbe Yisrael Avraham Portugal (d. 1915) of Skulen - author of Shem uSh'aris Yisrael - disciple of the K'lil Tiferes.
    - First Skulener Rebbe: Rabbi Eliezer Zusia Portugal of Skulen (1898-1982) - author of Noam Eliezer - son of the Shem uSh'aris Yisrael, disciple of Rabbi Yisrael Shalom Yosef Friedman (1863-1923), of Bohush and Rabbi Mordechai Shalom Yosef Friedman (1886-1979), of Sadigura.
      - Second Skulener Rebbe: Rabbi Yisroel Avrohom Portugal (1923-2019) - son of the Noam Eliezer.
        - Third Skulener Rebbe: (1956-2024) Rebbe Yeshaya Yakov Portugal z"tl - eldest son of Rebbe Yisroel Avrohom
          - Fourth Skulener Rebbe: (since 2024) Rav Aron Meir Portugal - eldest son of Rebbe Yeshaya Yakov Portugal
          - Skulener Rebbe of Williamsburg (Yeshuas Yaakov): (since 2024) Rav Eliezer Zusia Portugal- son of Rebbe Yeshaya Yakov Portugal
        - Skulener Rebbe of Williamsburg: Rebbe Meir Portugal - son of Rebbe Yisroel Avrohom
        - Skulener Rebbe of Monsey: Rebbe Efraim Yehuda Portugal - son of Rebbe Yisroel Avrohom
        - Skulener Rebbe of Lakewood: Rebbe Zvi Noach Portugal of Lakewood - son of Rebbe Yisroel Avrohom
        - Skulener Rebbe of Yerushalayim: Rebbe Shmiel Mordche Portugal (rebbe since December 2020). Previously Rav of Boro Park - son of Rebbe Yisroel Avrohom
