= Negurenii Vechi =

- Commune
- Location in Moldova
- Coordinates: 47°25′N 27°53′E
- Country: Moldova
- District: Ungheni District

Population (2014)
  - Total: 1,845
- Time zone: UTC+2 (EET)
  - Summer (DST): UTC+3 (EEST)

Negurenii Vechi is a commune in Ungheni District, Moldova. It is composed of four villages: Coșeni, Negurenii Vechi, Țîghira and Zăzulenii Vechi.

== Notable people ==
- Andrei Scobioală
