= Andrei Scobioală =

Bessarabian and Romanian politician (1884–1971)

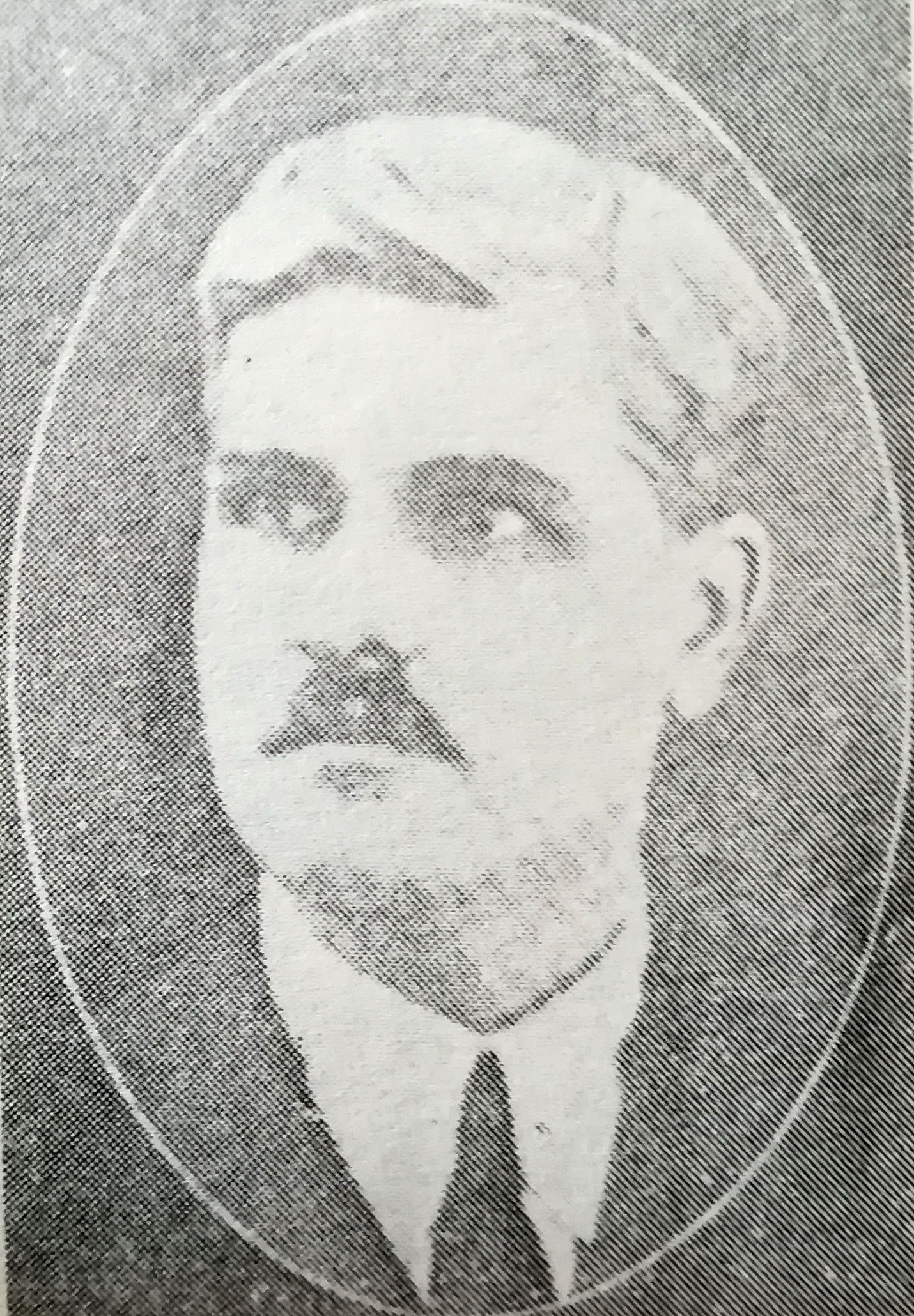

Member of the Moldovan Parliament
- In office 1917–1918

Personal details
- Born: 4 October 1884 Coşeni, Bălți County
- Died: 27 October 1971 (aged 87) Bucharest

Andrei Scobioală (1884–1971) was a Bessarabian politician, a professor of mathematics and a deputy in the Country Council between 1917 and 1919 and in the Parliament of Romania between 1928 and 1930.

== Biography ==
He studied at the Normal School in Bairancea and the Odessa Physics Faculty, taking his degree in 1909. It was mobilized for weapons during the First World War, more precisely in 1917, in a Russian unit on the Romanian front. Besides working on the front, he sent a letter to Gubernial Zemstvo at the beginning of the school year 1917–1918 in which he proposed to bring Transylvanian and Bucovina teachers from the prisoners and the refugees of war because he was worried about the situation of the native language education in Bessarabia, given the small number of Bessarabian teachers. On 18 February 1918 he participated in the opening of the Popular University of Chișinău, where he gave a speech.

Besides the political activity carried out in some Bessarabian and Romanian bodies and institutions, during the interwar period he was also a mathematics professor at the Normal School and the Military High School in Chișinău, as well as at the Lazăr High School in Bucharest (in 1940). In 1941 he returned to Chișinău, where he worked until 1944 as a teacher at the Normal School, after which he moved definitively to Bucharest. He died in 1971 because of a heart attack. He was buried at the Cărămidari cemetery in Bucharest (South Square).

== Gallery ==
Moldovan stamp, 1998

== Bibliography ==
- Gheorghe E. Cojocaru, Sfatul Țării: itinerar, Civitas, Chişinău, 1998, ISBN 9975-936-20-2
- Mihai Taşcă, Sfatul Țării şi actualele autorităţi locale, "Timpul de dimineaţă", no. 114 (849), June 27, 2008 (page 16)
