= Andrei Eșanu =

Historian of the Republic of Moldova

Andrei Eșanu OR
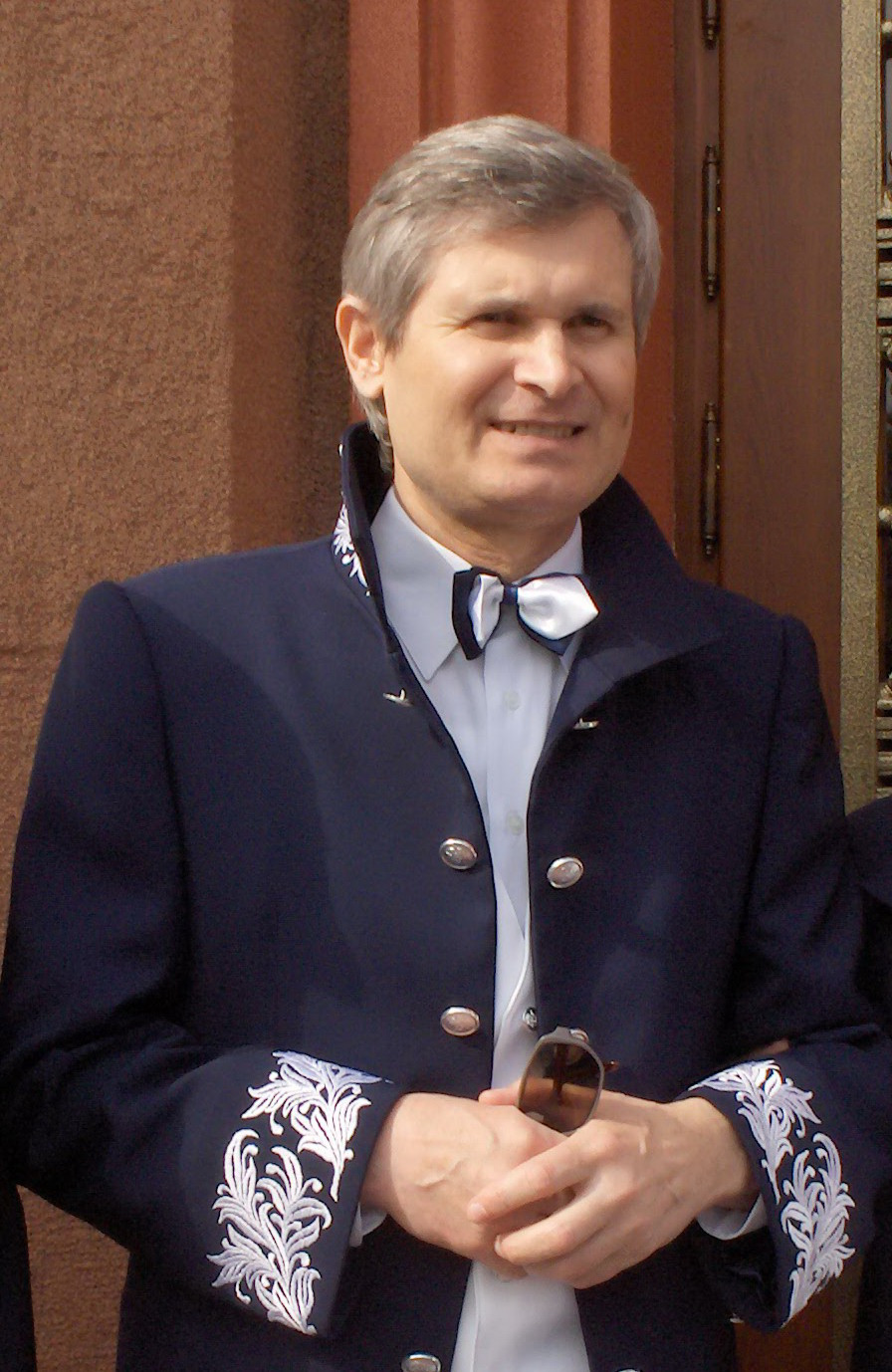
- Andrei Eșanu in 2005
- Born: July 16, 1948 (age 78); Sculeni, Ungheni District
- Spouse: Valentina Eşanu
- Children: 3

Academic background
- Education: Moldova State University

Academic work
- Discipline: Historian

Andrei Eșanu (born 16 July 1948) is a historian (Doctor habilitatus in history), writer and researcher from the Republic of Moldova. He is a member of the Commission for the Study of the Communist Dictatorship in Moldova. He is part of the Academy of Sciences of Moldova, and was elected an honorary member of the Romanian Academy in 2011.

== Biography ==
Andrei Eșanu was born on July 16, 1948, in the Sculeni village, Ungheni District, Moldavian SSR, USSR). He studied at the faculty of history of the State University in Chișinău. He worked for almost a year as a history teacher, after which he was employed in the Institute of History of the ASM in 1972.

He was a member of the CPSU (Communist Party of the Soviet Union).

Passionate about the history of medieval and modern culture and civilization in Southeastern and Eastern Europe, Eșanu has researched political history and international relations, the military history of the Moldova (14th to 19th century); has analyzed issues of medieval and modern urban history and civilization; problems of history and ecclesiastical culture and spirituality; has written about major personalities and cultural centers of Moldova.

The first scientific problem, to whose solving contributed, is the one related to the history of education, didactic literature and the spread of book science in Moldova of the 15th to 18th century. He wrote about 30 works on this subject, which included two monographs: School and Education in Moldova (15th to 18th century), published in 1982 by the publishing house "Știința" ("Science") in Chișinău, and another work named "Times overwhelmed by difficulties" published by the Chisinau publishing house "Universitas" in 1991.

Another block of issues, which concerned Andrei Eşanu, is the history of the printed book and manuscripts. In this regard, several works were written, including a monograph Dimitrie Cantemir "Description of Moldova". Manuscripts and editions, printed in 1987 by the Chisinau Publishing House "Science". Another group of works of the scientist is related to the medieval historiography of social-political thinking of medieval Moldova. Several works in this block are devoted especially to the work and scholarly activity of some of Moldovan medieval culture personalities: Grigore Ureche, Nicolae Milescu, Dimitrie Cantemir, etc.

In 1994, the scientist became blind. Since 1996, almost all the scientific papers edited by Andrei Eșanu have been worked out in collaboration with his wife Valentina Eșanu. The academician presented reports and communications to more than 100 international and national scientific forums in Moldova and abroad. He is actively involved in scientific and cultural life, being the president of the theoretical seminar at the Institute of History, State and Law (since 2003), member of the Expert Commission responsible for granting scientific and teaching degrees at the Higher Attestation Commission of the Republic of Moldova. He launched the research directions of medieval culture, the history of science and technology at the Institute of History of the ASM (Academy of Science of Moldova) the research laboratory of the history of culture at the State University of Moldova. He is a member of the redaction colleges of the magazine "Destin Românesc" (Bucharest-Chişinău), "The History of Moldova" (Chişinău), "Codrul Cosminului" (Suceava), "Limba Română" (Chişinău) and " Historical "(Bucharest). He was elected associate member of the Institute of Genealogy and Heraldry (Romanian Academy, Iasi, 2000).

Andrei Eșanu teaches basic courses at the Faculty of History of the State Pedagogical University "Ion Creangă" in Chisinau, at the Chisinau Teacher Training Institute, in front of the teachers from the republic. He contributed to the reactivation of theological education in the Republic of Moldova, had lectures at the Chiţcani Theological Seminary, at the Faculty of Theology of the State University of Moldova of Chisinau (until 1993) and at the Theological Academy in Chisinau (1993–1994).

In 2010, Andrei Eșanu was included in the commission for the study and assessment of the totalitarian communist regime in the Republic of Moldova, following a decree of the President Mihai Ghimpu.

== Family ==
He is married to Valentina Eșanu and has three children: Ștefan, Mircea and Ionuț. Ștefan has graduated from the Academy of Music, Theater and Fine Arts, Faculty of Fine Arts and is professor at the academy. He participated in the painting of the Nativity Cathedral, Chișinău.
