= Vasile Mândrescu =

Moldovan politician

Member of the Moldovan Parliament
- In office 1917–1918

Personal details
- Born: 1888
- Died: Unknown

Vasile Mândrescu (born 1888, Bogzesti, Orgeyevsky Uyezd, Basarabia Governorate, Russian Empire – d. 20th century) was a Bessarabian politician, member of the Land Council of the Moldovan Democratic Republic.

== Biography ==
He served as Member of the Moldovan Parliament (1917–1918). He was one of the members of the County Council who voted for the Union of Bessarabia with Romania in the session of 27 March 1918.

== Gallery ==
Moldovan stamp, 1998

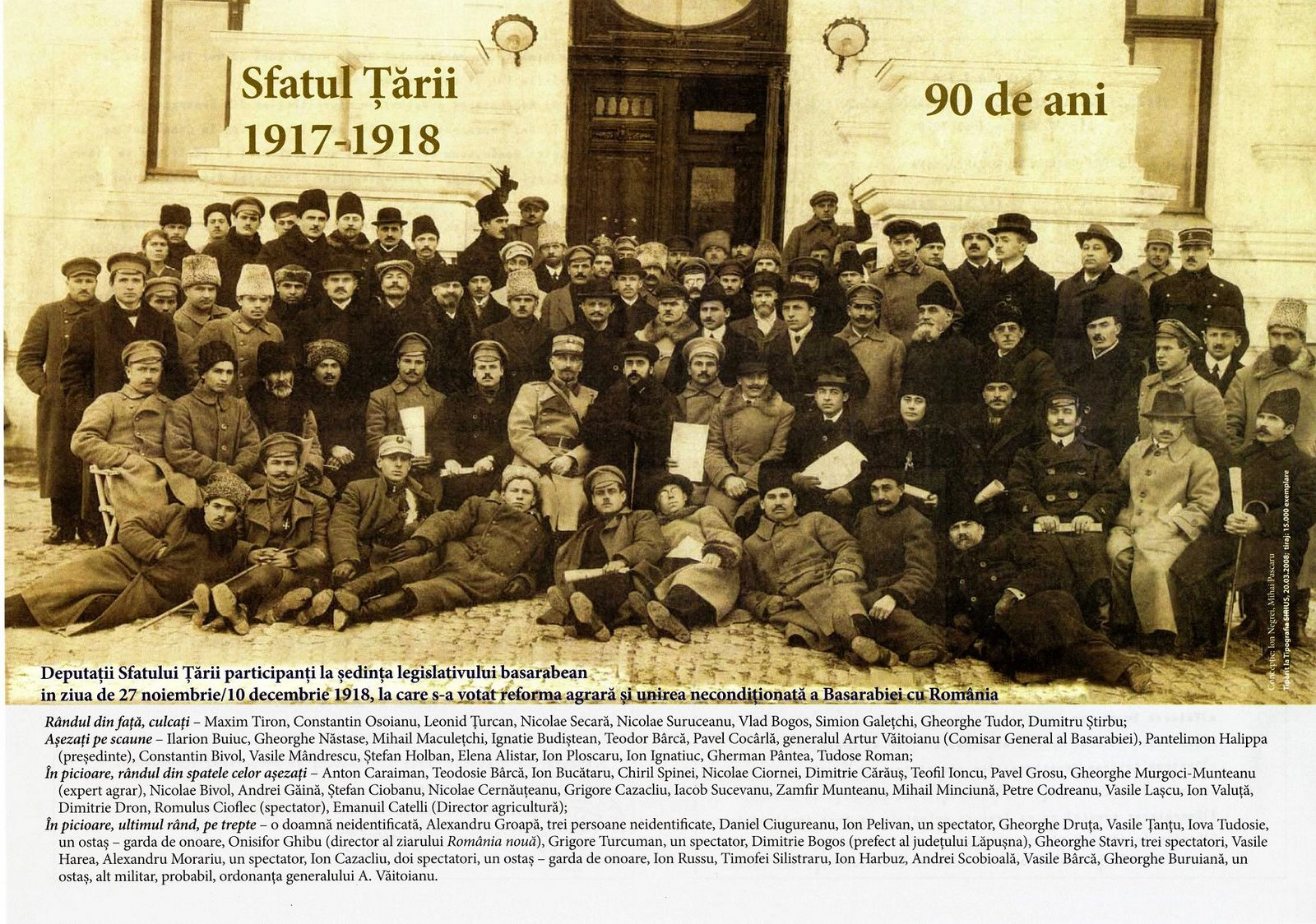
Members of the Council of the Country, 10 December 1918.
