= Vasile Bârcă =

Moldovan politician

Member of the Moldovan Parliament
- In office 1917–1918

Mayor of Chișinău
- In office 1922–1923
- Preceded by: Iulian Levinski
- Succeeded by: Gherman Pântea
- In office 1924–1925
- Preceded by: Nicolae Bivol
- Succeeded by: Nicolae Bivol

Personal details
- Born: 2 January 1884 Ignăței, Rezina District
- Died: 14 May 1949 (aged 65) Bucharest
- Party: National Moldavian Party; National Liberal Party
- Education: Saint Petersburg State University

Vasile Bârcă (2 January 1884 – 14 May 1949) was a Bessarabian and Romanian politician, member of the Sfatul Țării, Mayor of Chișinău, and minister during Greater Romania.

== Biography ==
Vasile Bârcă studied law at the University of Petersburg (1906), earning a doctorate, and worked as a lawyer. He was elected to the Sfatul Țării (Council of the Country) by the Soroca County Congress on 5 March 1918 and presided over the congress that preliminarily voted for Soroca County’s union with Romania. His mandate ran from 18 March 1918 to 18 February 1919. As a deputy, he advocated for the positive resolution of all issues concerning Bessarabia’s union with the Motherland.

== Sfatul Țării, Greater Romania ==
In the Sfatul Țării, he held the positions of Vice-President (25 November 1918 – 18 February 1919), Deputy Chairman of the Constitutional Commission (19 May – 27 November 1918), and member of the Legal Commission.

After the Union, he devoted himself to political and administrative activities, joining the National Liberal Party. He served as General Director at the Department of the Interior, ad‑interim at Domains and the Directorate of Justice in 1920–1921, Mayor of Chișinău in 1922–1923 and again in 1924–1925, President of the Unification Commission, Undersecretary of State at the Ministry of the Interior in 1936–1937, director of the daily newspaper Basarabia, and deputy for Orhei County in ten legislatures. Vasile Bârcă died on 14 May 1949 in Bucharest and was buried at Bellu Cemetery.
