= Gheorghe E. Cojocaru =

Moldovan historian (born 1963)

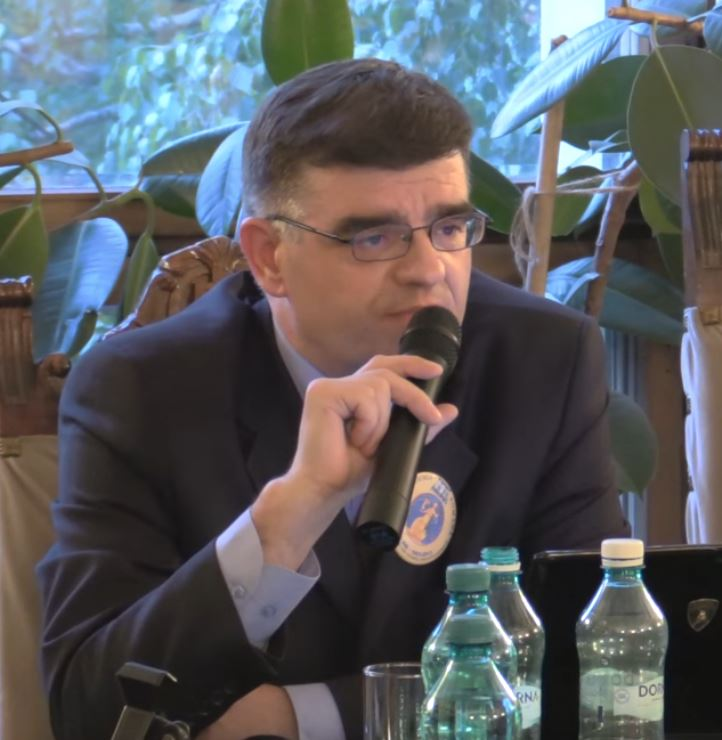
- Cojocaru in 2013
- Born: 8 February 1963 (age 63)
- Citizenship: Moldova
- Education: PhD
- Alma mater: Moldova State University
- Occupation: Historian
- Employer: Academy of Sciences of Moldova
- Known for: head of the Commission for the Study of the Communist Dictatorship in Moldova
- Notable work: The Comintern and the Origins of Moldovanism
- Title: Professor of History

Gheorghe E. Cojocaru (born 8 February 1963) is a historian from the Republic of Moldova.

== Biography ==
Gheorghe E. Cojocaru was born on 8 February 1963. He graduated from Moldova State University in 1986 and got a PhD from University of Bucharest in 1996. Cojocaru is a scientific researcher and coordinator with the Institute of History, State and Law of the Academy of Sciences of Moldova. He was the editor of Arena Politicii magazine (1996–1998). Cojocaru has been a political commentator for Radio Free Europe since 1998. He has written several books and articles related to politics and history of Moldova.

Gheorghe E. Cojocaru is also Chair of the Commission for the study and analysis of the totalitarian communist regime in Republic of Moldova, designated by Presidential Decree signed by the Acting President of Moldova, Mihai Ghimpu.

== Works ==
=== The Comintern and the Origins of Moldovanism ===
His book The Comintern and the Origins of Moldovanism (Chişinău, 2009) chronologically presents yet-unpublished documents of the Comintern which functioned in Moscow, and were discovered by the author in the Comintern archives in Moscow, Kyiv, Bucharest and Chişinău. The documents, which date back to the 1924-1928 period, were translated from Russian and argue the Soviet-type construction of the concept of "Moldovanism" and its inoculation among the population of Bessarabia, through the creation of the Moldovan Autonomous Soviet Socialist Republic in 1924.

The book was launched on 4 December 2009 at the National History Museum of Moldova in Chişinău. At the launch of the book, Alexandru Moşanu said:

Politicians who will read this book will realize that Moldovanism ideology appeared as a policy of ethnic assimilation of the Romanians from Transnistria, then from the entire space of the former Moldavian Soviet Socialist Republic. And now in the Republic of Moldova.

On 22 January 2010, the Ministry of Foreign Affairs (Romania) launched the book in Bucharest. At the launch of the book, the Foreign Minister of Romania Teodor Baconschi said:

We learn from Mr. Cojocaru’s book that 'Moldovanism' denies the Romanian identity roots and that its favorite method is exaggeration and mystification: slang becomes literary language, and a region on the Dniester's bank becomes a 'state' with a distinct 'Moldovan' identity.

=== List of works ===
The following is a list of works that were published:

- Gheorghe E. Cojocaru, The Comintern and the Origins of Moldovanism, Civitas, Chişinău, 2009.
- Gheorghe E. Cojocaru, Tratatul de Uniune Sovietică, Editura "Civitas" 2006.
- Gheorghe E. Cojocaru, Colapsul URSS și dilemma relațiilor româno-române, București: Editura Omega, 2001.
- Gheorghe E. Cojocaru, Politica externa a Republicii Moldova [The foreign policy of the Republic of Moldova], Ed. a 2-a, rev. si adaugita. - Chişinău: Civitas, 2001. - 208 p., ISBN 9975-936-75-X
- Gheorghe E. Cojocaru, Politica externă a Republicii Moldova. Demersuri privind aplanarea conflictului transnistrean, CIVITAS, Chişinău 2001.
- Gheorghe E. Cojocaru, 1989 la est de Prut, Prut Internaţional, Chişinău, 2001, Coordinator: Ion Negrei.
- Gheorghe E. Cojocaru, Sfatul Țării: itinerar, Civitas, Chişinău, 1998, ISBN 9975-936-20-2
- Gheorghe Cojocaru, Funeraliile URSS (Belovejskaia Puşcia, 1991).
