= Vladimir Herța =

Bessarabian Romanian politician, landowner, and philanthropist (1868–1924)

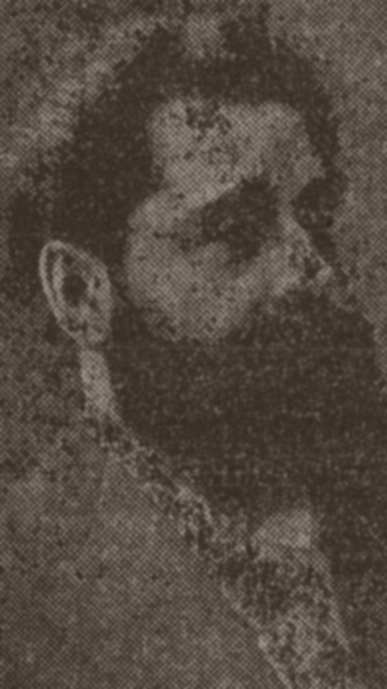
- Herța c. 1900

Mayor of Chișinău
- In office c. September 1918 – May 1919
- Preceded by: Alexander Schmidt
- Succeeded by: Teodor Cojocaru

Chairman of the Zemstvo in Orgeyevsky Uyezd
- In office March 1917 – 1918

Personal details
- Born: 14 May [O.S. 2 May] 1868 Kishinev (Chișinău), Bessarabia Governorate, Russian Empire
- Died: 3 August 1924 (aged 56) Chișinău, Kingdom of Romania
- Resting place: Chișinău Central Cemetery
- Party: Romanian League (1919)
- Other political affiliations: National Moldavian Party (1917–1918); National Liberal Party (1924)
- Spouse: Natalia Levinskaya
- Profession: Landowner, agriculturalist, lawyer, industrialist, singer, philanthropist

Vladimir or Wladimir Herța (Russian: Владимир Константинович Херца, romanized: Vladimir Konstantinovich Hertsa; 14 May [O.S. 2 May] 1868 – 3 August 1924), was a Bessarabian-born Romanian politician, entrepreneur, jurist, and amateur singer. He was initially active in the Bessarabia Governorate of the Russian Empire, where his family owned large estates that served as his main source of income. He claimed descent from the boyardom, asserting both Romanian ethnicity and inclusion within the Russian nobility, though his claims were disputed. Herța trained as a lawyer and established a legal practice in Kishinev, where he built himself a Baroque Revival villa, later used for political gatherings during and after the Russian Revolution of 1905. In that context, he was a liberal-conservative member of the zemstvo, who embraced certain tenets of Romanian nationalism while criticizing separatist aspirations in Bessarabia. After the revolutionary events, he settled in the Kingdom of Romania, alternating between Iași and Bucharest. His capitalist ventures included a cement factory in Dudești and glassworks in Deleni-Maxut.

At the height of World War I, and in the context of the February Revolution, Herța came to lead the zemstvo of Orgeyevsky Uyezd, where he owned land at Onișcani. Alongside Vladimir Cristi, Vasile Stroescu, and Paul Gore, he represented the right wing of Bessarabian autonomism. This group favored devolution under the Russian Provisional Government while opposing the absorption of Bessarabia by the Ukrainian People's Republic. Though agreeing to merge into the National Moldavian Party, which had Herța as vice-president, the faction was wary of the more left-leaning agenda of younger nationalists such as Ion Pelivan and Ion Inculeț, remaining conservative on issues of land ownership. Herța campaigned for the establishment of a Bessarabian assembly, which was ultimately formed under the name Sfatul Țării. The separatist drive coincided with the October Revolution, as Bessarabian politicians coalesced around opposition to Soviet Russia, forming the independent Moldavian Democratic Republic as an anti-communist entity.

Herța subsequently supported the Romanian military intervention in Bessarabia and, in early 1918, welcomed the Moldavian republic's union with Romania. The new regime, which initially favored Bessarabian autonomy, appointed him Mayor of Chișinău in September 1918. After the war, a regional power struggle led by Inculeț’s Bessarabian Peasants' Party resulted in the purge of dissidents from the local administration. Herța, who lost his office during these events, attempted to establish his own opposition group, the Romanian League, later aligning it with the nationwide People's Party. He remained committed to administrative devolution and strongly objected to the land reform, yet continued to advocate national unity, participating as a delegate of Bessarabian landowners in the Paris Peace Conference. He was also outspoken in his anti-communism and opposition to Soviet expansionism. After a period of withdrawal from politics, Herța made a brief return as a local leader of the National Liberal Party in 1924, but died suddenly that same year, leaving his widow in poverty. His villa endures as a secondary venue of the National Museum of Fine Arts, Chișinău.

== Biography ==
=== Early life ===
Herța was born on 14 May 1868 in Chișinău (known in Russian as Kishinev). Historian Gheorghe E. Cojocaru describes him as hailing from an "old family of noblemen"; likewise, the physician and social commentator I. Duscian identifies him as a titular member of the boyar class of ancestral Moldavia. One report from 1910 claimed that Vladimir's family had founded an eponymous town in Moldavia's Dorohoi County. Such accounts are questioned by other authors, including Iurie Colesnic. Through his father Constantin, Vladimir probably descended from German colonists, but apparently hid his origins by presenting himself as a member of the boyardom, and adding a nobiliary particle, de, to his family name. Some of his contemporaries believed that he was a baron.

Herța is believed to have graduated from the prestigious Gymnasium No 1 in his native city, but in 1879 he was registered as a third-year student at the Gubernial High School—one year behind Constantin Stere and Toma Ciorbă. He is also presumed to have completed law school in Yaroslavl, thus qualifying as an attorney. He married early in life, disobeying his father and forfeiting his right to the Herța estate. For a while, he lived in the Kingdom of Italy, earning money as a street musician; he was a noted baritone. He eventually inherited from Constantin, but squandered most of that wealth over several decades. His attested wife in later years was Natalia Levinskaya, whose father Iulian Levinski was a local politician in the Governorate; she herself had once been lady-in-waiting to Alexandra Feodorovna, the Russian Empress. In December 1893, after an incident on the Romanian–Russian border, at Novoselytsia (where one Bessarabian boatmen had been shot by a Romanian border guard), Herța served on an investigation committee that represented both sides of the diplomatic conflict.

Herța's main source of revenue was his agricultural land: in 1901, he was recorded as the owner of 238 dessiatin, or about 260 hectares, in Hirișeni; in 1905, he owned various estates totaling 17,000 hectares. He was also engaged in business dealings in Romania—he reportedly preferred that jurisdiction even as a youth, having grown "disgusted by the life he had lived" under Tsarist autocracy. Until 1911, his and his family's main residence was the former Moldavian capital of Iași, at 10 Catargi Boulevard. In July 1899, acting as a representative for the Bessarabian lady Ecaterina Moscoleva, he bought a townhouse from the local chemist Petru Poni. In April 1900, he sold that property to the Stere, who had since escaped from Bessarabia as a political convict. Stere who paid him a sum of 11,000 rubles. By January 1906, he had bought back the house from Stere, and was using it as his legal address.

=== 1905 Revolution and World War I ===
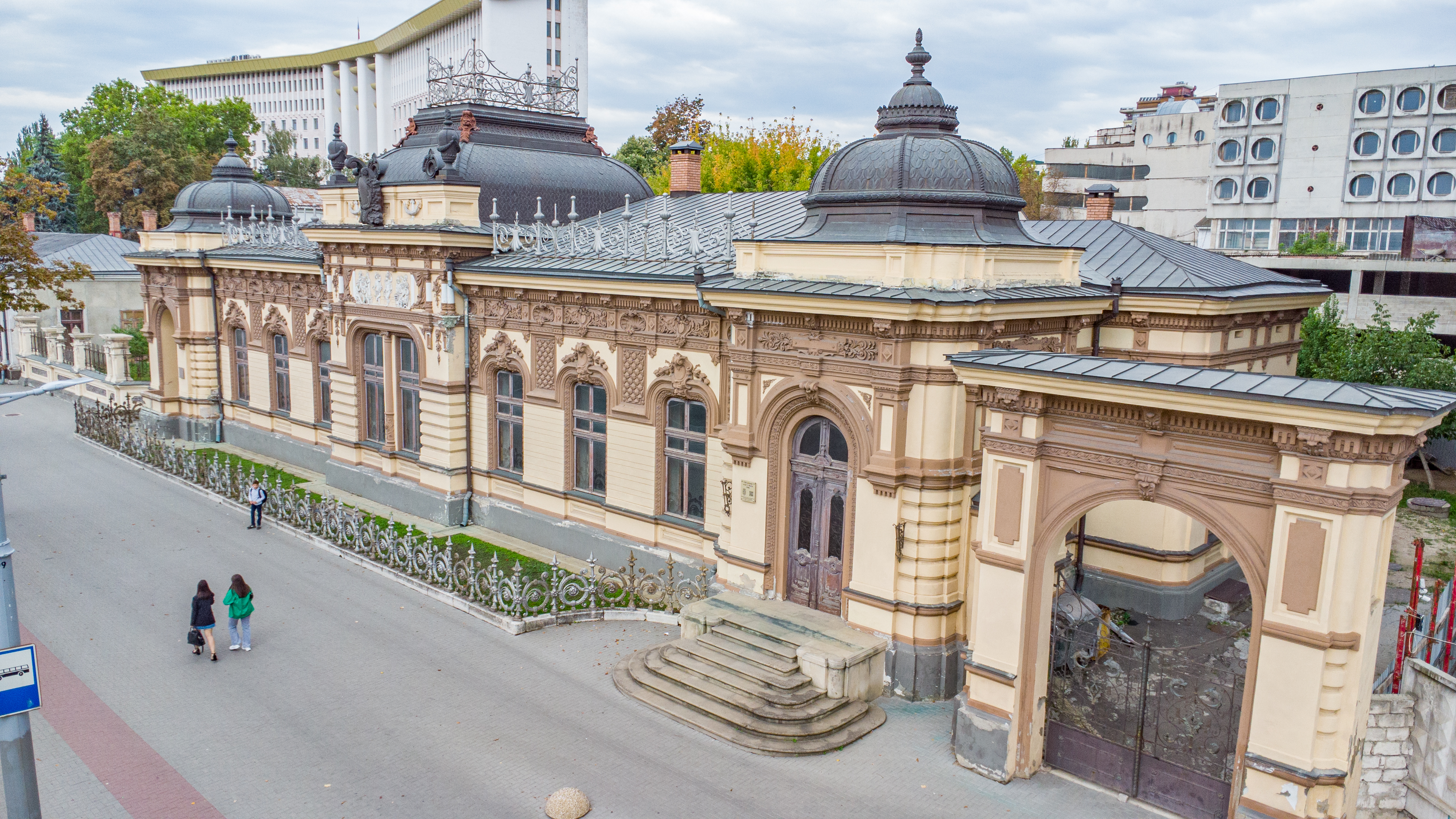
Side view of Herța's villa

At Kishinev, Herța bought himself the Balș Orphanage on Alexandrovskaya Avenue, demolished it in 1903, and had it rebuilt as a Baroque Revival villa by 1905. It was designed by a team of architects that included Heinrich Lonski of Austria-Hungary, and was considered one of Kishinev's most beautiful buildings, as well as a center for functions involving high society. Herța had a political role in the Russian Revolution of 1905, as it unfolded regionally. In October, his new home became an informal headquarters for the liberal faction of the Kishinev zemstvo, which soon became a chapter of the Constitutional Democratic Party. As a member of that group, Mayor Leopold Siținski made a half-joking proposal that Herța be proclaimed a Hospodar, or Prince, over the entirety of Bessarabia. Herța encouraged the growth of a progressive movement, giving his blessing to the appearance of Ion Pelivan's Romanian-language paper, called Basarabia. Ahead of the legislative elections in March 1906, Bessarabia's intellectuals split into factions. The radicalized youth, which cultivated Romanian nationalism and democratic ideals, recognized Pelivan as its informal leader. The conservative group, formed around Pavel Dicescu, supported education in Romanian, but was skeptical of other nationalist goals; its affiliates included Herța, Paul Gore, and Teodor Suruceanu. Their failure to embrace a common agenda hurt their chances in the election, and as a result all Bessarabian seats in the State Duma went to Russians and Russophiles.

In 1907, the Herța villa was briefly requisitioned by the Volhynian Life Guards Regiment, and was then leased to the Modern Theater. The "baron" was still based in Romania, where he also took his mother, Porfira. She died in Iași in December 1908, whereupon her remains were transported for interment in Bessarabia. In late 1910, Herța made one of his return trips to Kishinev; his train was stopped at Ungheni by the Special Corps of Gendarmes, who searched all the luggage and confiscated various books. By November 1911, he had moved to the Romanian capital, Bucharest. As a parting gift, he and Natalia donated to the charity led by Maria Hinna, which provided warm meals for Iași's underclass. Hinna later received his home in Iași, which she put up for public auction in December 1913.

In 1910, Herța was vice president of Titan Company, which manufactured cement and concrete blocks in Ilfov County, in what was then the unincorporated town of Dudești. In 1912, he took over as chairman from Mihail G. Cantacuzino, who was serving in the first Maiorescu cabinet; Herța was still recorded as chairman in March 1914. That same year, the factory was granted its own station by the state railway carrier, also servicing the suburb of Cățelu. In June 1913, Herța welcomed at Titan a delegation of the Romanian Polytechnic Society, led by Anghel Saligny, who praised the enterprise for the "superior quality [and] affordable pricing" of its products. He was involved in a joint venture with Fenicia Glassworks, operating the Maxut glass factory in Deleni-Maxut (opened in 1912, and sold to other investors in 1919). In May 1914, he and Alexandru Obregia established Providența Society, which traded in Romanian petroleum; as the largest contributor, he owned stock equivalent to 50,000 lei.

The purpose of Herța's presence in Romania was being questioned in some circles: in April 1914, an anonymous source depicted him as a Russian spy. Herța answered with a publicized letter, indicating that Vasile Morțun of Internal Affairs had personally vetted him. During the first two years of World War I, when Romania still pursued neutrality, he continued to live in Bucharest; on 3 February 1916, he performed at the Romanian Atheneum, in a benefit recital for Italy's cultural institutions. Following The Romanian Debacle, during which the Central Powers took Bucharest and all of Wallachia, he escaped to Western Moldavia, which was still under Romanian control and defended by the Imperial Russian Army. He remained there just as the February Revolution had erupted in Russia. He only made his way back to Bessarabia as the uprising was unfolding, and was voted in as chairman of the zemstvo in Orgeyevsky Uyezd. He had registered as a zemstvo voter in Onișcani, where, in 1915, he owned 346 dessiatin (some 380 hectares).

Herța and Gore formed a close bond with Vladimir Cristi, who had been appointed Bessarabian Governor by the Russian Provisional Government; the three of them reacted against the Central Rada of Kiev, which wanted Bessarabia absorbed into a Greater Ukraine. They formulated their protest as a telegram ("in Romanian with Cyrillic characters"), addressing it to Borys Martos. The revolutionary climate offered impetus for the political solidarity of Romanian-speakers in Bessarabia, who soon after formed their own National Moldavian Party (PNM). As recounted by activist Elena Alistar, it stemmed from an initiative committee which was already functioning on 1 March. Its 40-some members included herself and Herța, alongside Gore, Nicolae Alexandri, Pan Halippa, and Simeon G. Murafa. The resulting party was formed on 5 April, when it elected Herța and Gore as its vice presidents, seconding chairman Vasile Stroescu. Herța was also made president of the Moldavian Cultural Society and the Moldavian School Board.

=== Moldavian Republic and 1918 union ===
Herța and Halippa represented the PNM at a political rally of the Romanian-speaking soldiers in the Russian Army, which was held in Odesa in late April 1917. On 28 May, Herța appeared before the Moldavian Teachers' Congress, denouncing Tsarist autocracy for having kept Bessarabians as "humble slaves, with no rights, no justice, no means of enlightenment". He saluted Russia's prospects of becoming a "federative republic" with the "largest possible autonomy for Bessarabia", and argued that teachers could act as messengers for the "democratization of public life". As reported by congress participant Onisifor Ghibu, he still took a conservative stance regarding the Romanian Latin alphabet, advising his colleagues not to press for its adoption in Bessarabia.

On 5 June, Herța and Murafa appeared at a ceremony honoring the Romanian Volunteer Corps in Russia, which they presented with a flag and an icon. During July, after clear signals that the newly formed Ukrainian People's Republic considered Bessarabia as a part of its territory, the PNM accelerated its project of establishing a separate Bessarabian assembly, to transmit forward the will of its constituents. Governor Cristi encouraged Herța to present himself as the person backing this proposal, since he himself, as a Russian government official, could not automatically count on "the Bessarabian masses." Pelivan, who had been drawn into a direct cooperation with the Provisional Government and supported its social justice agenda, similarly observed that Herța and the PNM leader Stroescu were landowners of the zemstvo, and that, as such, they could not expect to be "obeyed by the popular masses." Ovid Țopa of Bukovina, who had obtained appointment on Bessarabian government bodies and was channeling support for Romanian nationalism, described both Herța ("a distinguished, handsome man") and Gore as allies of the "Moldavian" cause, "however much this harmed their own material interests". Țopa notes that they only objected to young radicals because the latter "have no experience in life and politics."

Variant of Alexis Nour's map, showing the Moldavian Democratic Republic and its Romanians ("that are known as Moldavians in Russia and Bessarabia")

During the final days of July, Cristi visited Russian leader Alexander Kerensky in Petrograd, obtaining from him an informal pledge that Ukraine and Bessarabia would remain separate within the envisaged Russian federative republic. Cristi convinced his host with a memorandum that had been drafted by Herța and Gore, alongside an ethic map created by Alexis Nour. That same month, the two men, alongside Teodor Neaga, addressed letters to Romanian teachers from Romania, Transylvania and the Duchy of Bukovina, inviting them to help educate the Bessarabians in their ancestral language. As reported by Romulus Cioflec, who came in with these recruits, the PNM was further weakened when Murafa was assassinated, "in broad daylight", by Russian soldiers. Herța himself went into hiding at his estate of Onișcani, allowing the public to believe that he was in Moscow.

An all-Bessarabian legislative body, ultimately known as Sfatul Țării, ultimately emerged during autumn 1917, from talks between the PNM and delegates of the ethnic minorities; all such preliminary meetings were held in Herța's villa. Herța himself appeared at the negotiations as "chairman of the unified national organizations", and, in his speech, outlined the case for rejecting the Ukrainian annexation. He was also the first person to submit the formal proposal for the establishment of a regional legislative body—insisting for proportional representation along ethnic lines. As a result, 70% of the seats were to be reserved for Romanian-speakers, still known locally as "Moldavians". His suggestion was then taken up by a commission of all represented groups—it was steered by Herța himself, after Cristi had appointed him. He registered a preliminary defeat when most of his guests supported not his vision of Bessarabian autonomy, but instead a consultative body that would send documents to the Russian Constituent Assembly. New adversaries emerged, calling Herța out as a "separatist" and a Romanian nationalist, and managing to get his commission to suspend all activities. As Colesnic reports, Herța was in fact still committed to Russia, owing to the "moral deadweight" of his Russian education.

According to Pelivan, the Bessarabian Romanian leftists did not oppose either Stroescu and Herța during the Sfatul elections of November, believing that representation of all social categories would advance the greater agenda. Herța did not emerge as a deputy, but was probably involved in selecting agronomist Pyotr Z. Bazhbeuk-Melikov as an official representative of the Armenian community. The October Revolution, which toppled Kerensky and formed Soviet Russia, also accelerated separatism in Bessarabia, now governed as a fledgling Moldavian Democratic Republic. In early 1918, it was supported by a Romanian military intervention, which reached Chișinău. On 24 January, which was celebrated in Romania as a Day of Unification, Herța appeared at a Romanian–Bessarabian festival in the republican capital, giving what one eyewitness described as a "beautiful and thoughtful speech." Shortly after, the republic gave up its independence, and Sfatul, as its parliament, voted in favor of union with Romania. Herța agreed with the initial form of the act, as successfully negotiated in March 1918 by the Romanian Premier, Alexandru Marghiloman, and by Herța's old acquaintance, Constantin Stere. He was among the PNM figures who negotiated with other groups, helping to obtain a unionist majority in the assembly. The Herța villa was hosting George Enescu, the Romanian composer and pianist, who as asked to perform a special concert in honor of the act.

=== Mayor and League founder ===
In June 1918, Herța was approached by Stere, who wanted him to run as Mayor. To Stere's chagrin, Herța refused to present himself before the city council, which confirmed Alexander Schmidt for that position. Herța ultimately replaced Schmidt in September, after the old bodies of local government had been dissolved through a Romanian royal decree. Initially, he was only the president of an interim commission, but was then fully confirmed as Mayor. Duscian described him as the first Romanian to have governed the city since its annexation by Russia in 1812. Before the end of 1918, Marghiloman's version of the union was nullified by the newly formed Bessarabian Peasants' Party (PȚB), which had formed a new faction in the Sfatul. This group agreed to renounce the core tenets of Bessarabian autonomy; Herța regarded their intervention as illegitimate, and singled out PȚB leader Ion Inculeț, for having negotiated a new status quo in disregard of vetoes in each zemstvo, and against a likely majority inside the assembly as well. In November, the Coandă cabinet in Bucharest publicly endorsed the Inculeț option, and sent in Artur Văitoianu to negotiate with the opposition. Herța was called up for the meetings, and, though he continued to support Bessarabian autonomy, he now framed it having an "administrative", rather than "political", nature. He appeared at discussions between Văitoianu and Vladimir Tsyganko, who, as leader of the left-wing peasant caucus, strongly objected to centralization; Herța reportedly acted as a mediator.

Shortly after the narrower version of union had been effected, Mayor Herța, who continued to support administrative devolution, created an official conservative opposition to the PȚB. In March 1919, he formed the Romanian League (also called Bessarabian People's League), which had as its mouthpiece the newspaper Dezrobirea ("Liberation"). Originally an apolitical movement, it declared itself in favor of "legality, justice, and social equilibrium", admitting members of all religions, and extending friendship to all ethnic groups. The League reemerged in August as a conservative party; it was also joined by figures on the right wing of unionism, including Vasile Cijevschi, Petru Cazacu, Ion Costin, and Dmitri Semigradov.

Herța's mayoral politics included efforts to replace the Tsarist nomenclature—such as when he proposed that Leovskaia Street be renamed after Alexandru Cotruță. In early 1919, the PȚB's Daniel Ciugureanu, who had been appointed Minister for Bessarabia in the fifth Brătianu cabinet, pressured city governments across the region into resigning. Herța and his associates had stepped down by 5 May; he immediately left for Bucharest, where he contacted Marghiloman, who was leading the Progressive Conservatives. He spoke to him about Inculeț's penchant for political corruption, and about the PȚB's public rows with Father Nicodim Munteanu, who had been assigned to look after the Bessarabian Orthodox Bishopric. An interview with him was carried by Dimineața daily on 6 May, but appeared with gaps in the text, marking redactions performed by military censors. The visible portions included his statements about Bessarabia being "in one of the saddest situations" of its entire history, with some details as to how Chișinău's autonomy was being encroached upon by a series of government agents, including Vasile Bârcă. He also noted that Dezrobirea had been suppressed by government, "with no reason given." On 14 May, Teodor Cojocaru took over as head of an interim government of Chișinău.

Inculeț was alarmed by Herța's campaigning in Romania proper, seeing him as engaged in political intrigues at the highest level. Herța was reportedly offered a chance to return as mayor, but only if he agreed to "purge the city council." He had by then established contacts with the much larger People's Party, formed at Iași by Alexandru Averescu, and was rumored to be readying himself for a ministerial position in the Bucharest government—with Averescu tipped as Prime Minister of Romania. The League's stated objection to the coming land reform alienated other conservatives, including Stroescu. In September, the latter expressed his support for a redistribution with "rightful compensation", praising the Bessarabian peasantry as a first line of defense against Soviet communism. He chided "Mr Herța and the other ciocoi [exploiters]" for putting "their own situation as a class" above the national interest. Both Herța and Averescu's groups ended up boycotting the general election of November (except in Cahul County). The former mayor had reportedly tried to present himself as a candidate, but the electoral commission, allegedly controlled by the PȚB, had prevented him from running. He was by then being targeted by Ciugureanu, who claimed to have sued him for malfeasance in office. Herța debunked the claim, obtaining proof from the local prosecutor that no such action had been filed.

=== Final activities and death ===
Although caucusing with the PȚB in the resulting Assembly of Deputies, the Romanian nationalist historian Nicolae Iorga deplored the absence of "boyars" such as Herța and Gore (he described the "baron" as a "bearded Persian" dressed-up like a "miracle-working rabbi"). During the Paris Peace Conference, public opinion was temporarily unified around obtaining recognition for the Bessarabian–Romanian union. In that context, Herța and Gore were considered as delegates of the unionist landowners' caucus, who were supposed to provide evidence that the upper classes were just as pro-Romanian as the peasants. Other landowners, including Semigradov and Pantelimon V. Sinadino, expressed skepticism that the conference would ever approve of the Romanian cause. The delegation was therefore never dispatched to Paris, though Herța insisted that he would travel there alone; he ultimately did so, joining Ion I. C. Brătianu's pan-Romanian delegation. Gore could not attend in person, but sent a brochure expressing his vision of the union. According to notes left by the PȚB's Pelivan, Gore and Herța "were invited in at a very late stage, and refused to go", since both feared that Bessarabia would eventually fall to the White Russians, who seemed to dominate in the Russian south: "[they] asked themselves, quite naturally so: if Bessarabia ends up reunited with Russia, what will we do then? Do we take refuge?"

During his final years, Herța raised funds for a "Monument of the Union", which he wanted to replace a Russian statue of Alexander I, in downtown Chișinău. He continued to play a part in national politics: in April 1920, shortly after the rise of a second Averescu cabinet, he visited with Averescu; newspapers speculated that he was behind Inculeț's expulsion from the government team. By early 1922, he had become friendly toward the National Liberal Party (PNL): alongside Gore, Cijevschi, Ciugureanu, Ștefan Ciobanu, Ludovic Dauș, Iustin Frățiman and Gherman Pântea, he organized a commemorative festival in honor of PNL founder Ion C. Brătianu. Herța had also found a political friend in another one of Averescu's associates, namely Take Ionescu, who ended up forming his own cabinet in December 1921. Herța was reportedly asked by Ionescu to become his Minister for Bessarabia, but refused, fearing that his inclusion would have weakened Ionescu's support in the region.

When a land reform ultimately reached Bessarabia in 1921, Herța lost over 220 hectares in Onișcani, which were sold to the state for 77,271 lei, but was allowed to keep some 160 hectares, including his manor. He appealed the decision, and obtained a doubling of the monetary compensation in December 1922. He also acted as a legal representative for Otto Flondor and the Saint Quentin family, who were relatives of his, and who had been dispossessed of land in Cobâlceni. Returning to Bucharest in January 1922, he announced that he had recovered from illness which had kept him out of politics, but that he intended to stage his comeback—adding that to have stayed out of the public debate during a time of crisis was the equivalent of a "crime". In July, he was one of the Bessarabian lawyers who publicly supported General Ioan Popovici, accused of having ordered the extrajudicial shooting of three communist agitators. In May 1923, he was interviewed about regional issues by an Adevărul reporter. At the time, he had again withdrawn from politics and was dedicated to his legal practice (operating in the same building as Chișinău City Bank); he declared himself against "Bolshevik" agitation (noting that it was being supported by the Soviet Union, rather than homegrown), while also chiding the far-right students for their violent opposition to Jewish emancipation. In December, he successfully represented S. Grosman, who had sued his tenants over an expropriation deal at Ograda Armenească of Chișinău.

Continuing with his own business ventures, in June 1923 Herța was elected on the board of trustees at Reșița Works. He was also involved in a dispute over the assets at Titan, which had gone bankrupt: in June 1924, he was being sued for not having handed in his Titan receipts, showing who still owned stock in the company. Around that time, Herța rallied with the PNL, even as its local branch was facing bankruptcy. He was proposed as the sectional leader by a faction of older party members, including Costin. This project was never completed: he died suddenly in his Chișinău house on the evening of 3 August 1924. According to Duscian, he was organizing a meeting of his political friends, as he regularly did during his final years—despite ruining himself financially in the process. More detailed reports indicate that had just dined with General Vasile Rudeanu, and was in the process of dictating a telegram to Cazacu. He was buried in the Orthodox section of Chișinău Central Cemetery on 8 August. His political rival Bârcă, as the city mayor, delivered the oration to an "enormous crowd."

== Legacy ==
The prosecutor's office ordered a second autopsy on Herța's body in August 1924, after anonymous tips that he had been assassinated. A Chișinău street was named after him in 1927 (until 1934, it was noted for hosting a Bessarabian branch of the Hebrew Christian movement, under Lev Averbruch). Around 1931, Herța's name and stances were revisited in the Moldavian ASSR, organized by the Soviet Union on the left bank of the Dniester. Its communist intelligentsia was split between those who favored Moldovan Cyrillic and those who followed Soviet Latinization guidelines, which would have made the "Moldovan language" indistinguishable from Romanian. Writer Dmitrii Milev, who championed the Cyrillic option, reminded his adversaries that Latinization had once been favored by "reactionaries" and "landowners", Herța included.

The former mayor, like his father-in-law, had died penniless—amassing debts that were reportedly "to the tune of millions". This left Natalia in a difficult position, even after she collected the 400,000 lei her husband had deposited at the Marmorosch Blank Bank (and the additional 40,000 located with Moldova Bank). For a while, she was allowed to work as an honorary inspector of schools by special order of the then-Prime Minister, Nicolae Iorga. She was living in Chișinău in January 1929, when her home was robbed by a gang of juvenile delinquents. In May 1932, she tried to commit suicide by ingesting a large dose of corrosive sublimate. She was rescued and kept under observation at a hospital in Chișinău, but reprimanded her doctors for not having left her to die. The following month, Sergiu Donică Iordăchescu, who had been Herța's brother-in-law and was serving as comptroller of Chișinău, hanged himself at his own residence on Tighina Street.

Herța Street only kept that name for the remainder of Romanian rule in Bessarabia: in August 1940, the region was overtaken by the Soviet Union; in the resulting Moldavian SSR, the street was renamed after Ivan Michurin. Before the Soviet annexation, Herța's Chișinău home had housed the Ministry of Bessarabia, and, in 1939, the privately owned Fine Arts Museum. It maintained that purpose in the Moldavian SSR, when it was refashioned into a Soviet state institution. It was finally closed down in 1988, and from 1989 was under permanent conservation. In July 1990, at the height of Perestroika reforms, the old Herța and Unirii streets were merged with each other, forming a single avenue named after Sfatul Țării. In post-Soviet Moldova, his villa was nominally maintained as a seat of the Moldovan Arts Museum, and included on the Ministry of Culture's heritage list. It was partly renovated in the early 1990s, and had fallen into disrepair over the following two decades—with additional controversy over the manner in which restoration was carried out, as it reportedly destroyed some of the architectural ornaments. Colesnic argued in 2012 that the building was still "almost intact", and as such recoverable. Reports from 2022 suggest that it was "forgotten by the authorities" and vandalized by unknown assailants.
