= Sinadino =

The Sinadino family, or Synadinos (Greek: Συναδινός) is a prominent Greek noble family.

== History ==
The Synadinos family (known as Sinadino in the Bessarabia Governorate)originated in Anatolia, with branches later settling in Chios, the Cyclades, Crete, Kefalonia, and Corfu. One branch of the family, led by Ioannis Synadinos, a successful Greek merchant who settled, was established in Chișinău during the 19th century. He contributed funds for the construction of a building in the city. During the Romanian administration of Bessarabia (1918–1940), a street was named in his honor. It has not been established whether any familial connection exists between the old Byzantine Synadenos family and this Greek Synadinos family.

== Notable members ==
- Eleftherios Synadinos (born 1955), Greek army officer and politician
- Pantelimon I. Sinadino (fl. 1837–1842), Bessarabian politician
- Pantelimon V. Sinadino (1875–1940), Bessarabian politician
