= Reindhold Scheibler =

Mayor of Chișinău
- In office 1938–1938
- Preceded by: Constantin Dardan
- Succeeded by: Vladimir Cristi

Personal details
- Born: 2/22 June 1889 Berlin
- Party: National Christian Party
- Other party: National Agrarian Party

Reindhold Scheibler (born on 2 or 22 June 1889, in Berlin - dead.?) was a teacher, translator and prose writer of German ethnicity in the Kingdom of Romania, author of a German translation of the poem "Luceafărul", mayor of Chișinău in 1938.

== Biography ==
Reindhold Scheibler studied at the Faculty of Letters, becoming a German professor at the Commercial High School in Chișinău. He also worked as a teacher at the Military High School Monastery Hill. He was a leading member of the National Agrarian Party and then of the National Christian Party. With the later's support, he became the mayor of Chișinău for a few months in 1938. He was one of the leaders of Straja Țării, which served as a youth instrument of the National Renaissance Front. As a translator he manifested himself by translating the writings of Mihai Eminescu, Octavian Goga, Dimitrie Bolintineanu and others into German. In addition to the translatation work, in the encyclopaedia "Contemporary Figures from Bessarabia" Chișinău (1939), also appears his original work: "Pharaoh's Hand", "The Dream of the Watchman", "On the Other Way" and "A Night in the Camp".

In 1940, after the Soviet occupation of Bessarabia and Northern Bukovina, he moved to Nazi Germany, as part of the Heim ins Reich policy.
