= Sălăgeni =

Sălăgeni may refer to several villages in Romania:

- Sălăgeni, a village in Grozești Commune, Iași County
- Sălăgeni, a village in Dumbrăveni Commune, Suceava County
