= Sperantia =

Sperantia is a Romanian surname. Notable people with the surname include:

- Eugeniu Sperantia (1888–1972), Romanian poet, essayist, sociologist, and philosopher
- Theodor Speranția (1856–1929), Romanian playwright, humorist, folklorist, and journalist
