= Karl Shmidt =

Russian politician (1846–1928)

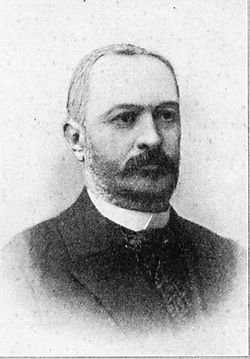

Mayor of Kishinev
- In office 1877–1903
- Preceded by: Clemante Șumanski
- Succeeded by: Leopold Siținski

Personal details
- Born: 25 June 1846 Beltsy, Bessarabia Governorate, Russian Empire
- Died: 11 April 1928 (aged 81) Chișinău, Kingdom of Romania
- Spouse: Maria Cristi
- Relations: Ioan V. Cristi (father-in-law)
- Children: 5, including Alexander Schmidt (1879–1954)
- Education: Imperial Novorossiya University

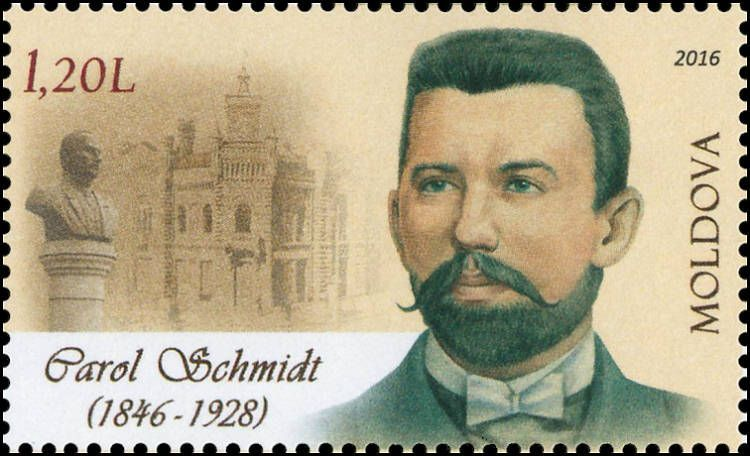
Schmidt on a 2016 Moldovan stamp

Karl Aleksandrovich Shmidt (Russian: Карл Александрович Шмидт; German: Karl-Ferdinand Alexander Schmidt; Romanian: Carol Schmidt 25 June 1846 – 11 April 1928) was an Imperial Russian politician active in the Bessarabia Governorate. A Bessarabian German, he was the longest serving mayor of Kishinev (now Chișinău, Moldova), serving from 1877 by 1903. He contributed greatly to its modernization and is considered one of the best mayors in the city's history. He was the father of Alexander Schmidt, who served as mayor of Kishinev between 1917 and 1918.

== Biography ==
Born in Bălți, in the family of Alexander Schmidt Senior, German Bessarabian, surgeon at the Medical Directorate of Bessarabia. Carol Schmidt's mother was of Polish origin.

== Career ==
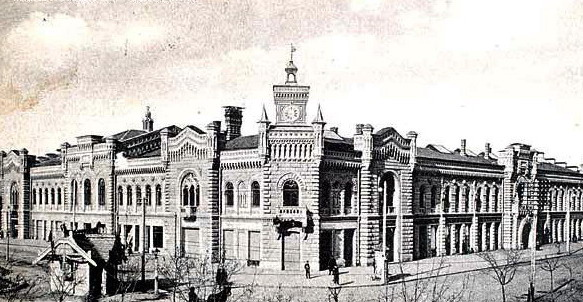
The City Duma building was built between 1898 and 1901, during Shmidt's tenure as mayor

In 1857–1863 he studied at the Regional Gymnasium of Kishinev. After graduation he studied at the Faculty of Physics and Mathematics of St. Vladimir University in Kiev between 1863–1864, but in 1865 he transferred to the Faculty of Law of the Imperial Novorossiya University, from which he graduated with the degree of doctor in legal sciences.

He was a candidate, then an assistant prosecutor in Tigina, then head of the prosecution department in Kishinev. In 1870 he was appointed criminal prosecutor of the District Court of Kishinev, and between 1872 and 1908 was honorary justice of the peace of Kishinev. In 1877 he was elected mayor of Kishinev, and then re-elected successively until his resignation in 1903, as a response to the Kishinev pogrom.

"The pogrom against the Jews in Kishinev in April 1903 was the last drop that filled the glass and caused Karl Shmidt to resign. He, who had done so much for the europeanization of the city, could not conceive that here the inhabitants can have such a wild mentality. This was the reason for his resignation. A sensitive and cultured man like him was incompatible with the Black Hundreds that dictated the political fashion of the day. No other lesson could be given to the town citizens except [his] resignation ..."— Pantelimon V. Sinadino, Nash Kishinev ("Our Kishinev"), 1903–04.

== Activity and reforms ==
He contributed to the construction of the chapel in the Râșcani district and several houses for the people with disabilities (1877–81). With his contribution the streets were paved, an asylum was opened (1899), the popular Amphitheater with the performance space was built (1900), the bust of Pushkin was unveiled, the first tram lines were opened (1881–95), the first aqueduct was built and the city's sewerage network, street lighting was introduced, numerous buildings were built (Royal School (1886), Princess Natalia Dadiani's Girls' Gymnasium (1900), County History Museum (1889), the current headquarters of the City Hall (1901), etc.).

He was a member of the Bessarabian Committee for the Protection of Orphanages, president of the Kishinev Directorate of the Young Students Aid Society, epitropist of the High School of Commerce and of the Royal School.

He initiated to open a museum of schools, of the Harmony Music Society and of the city school of Fine Arts (1894, today – the College of fine arts Alexandru Plămădeală).

== Family ==
He was married to Maria Cristi, the daughter of Bessarabian nobleman Ioan V. Cristi, president of the local zemstvo, and of Alexandra Nelidov (niece of Russian diplomat Aleksandr Nelidov). Karl Shmidt and his wife had 5 children, one of them, Aleksandr, serving as mayor of Kishinev in 1917–1918.

== Legacy ==
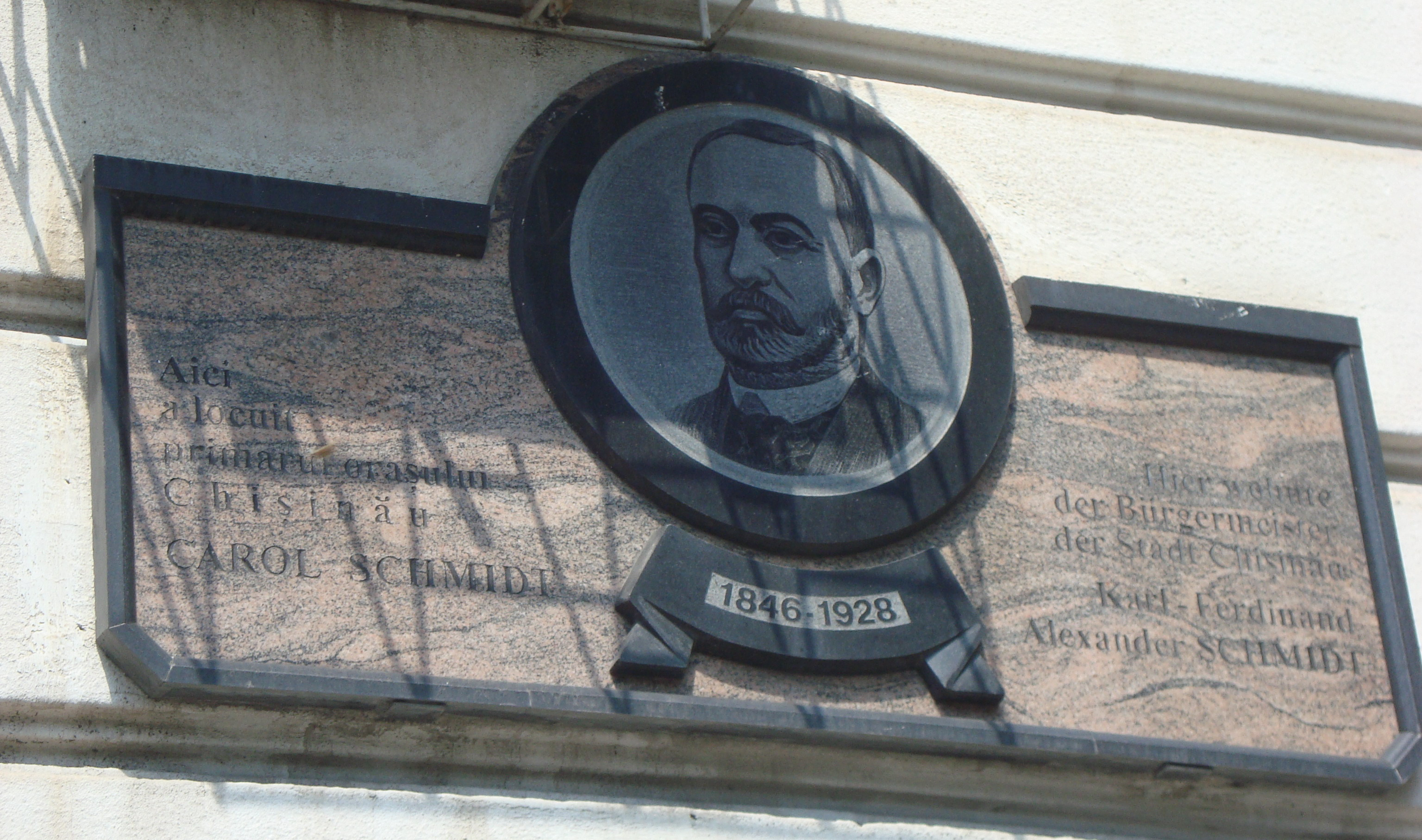
Memorial plaque at Shmidt's former house in Chișinău (author Veaceslav Jiglițchi.)(84 Metropolitan Varlaam str.)

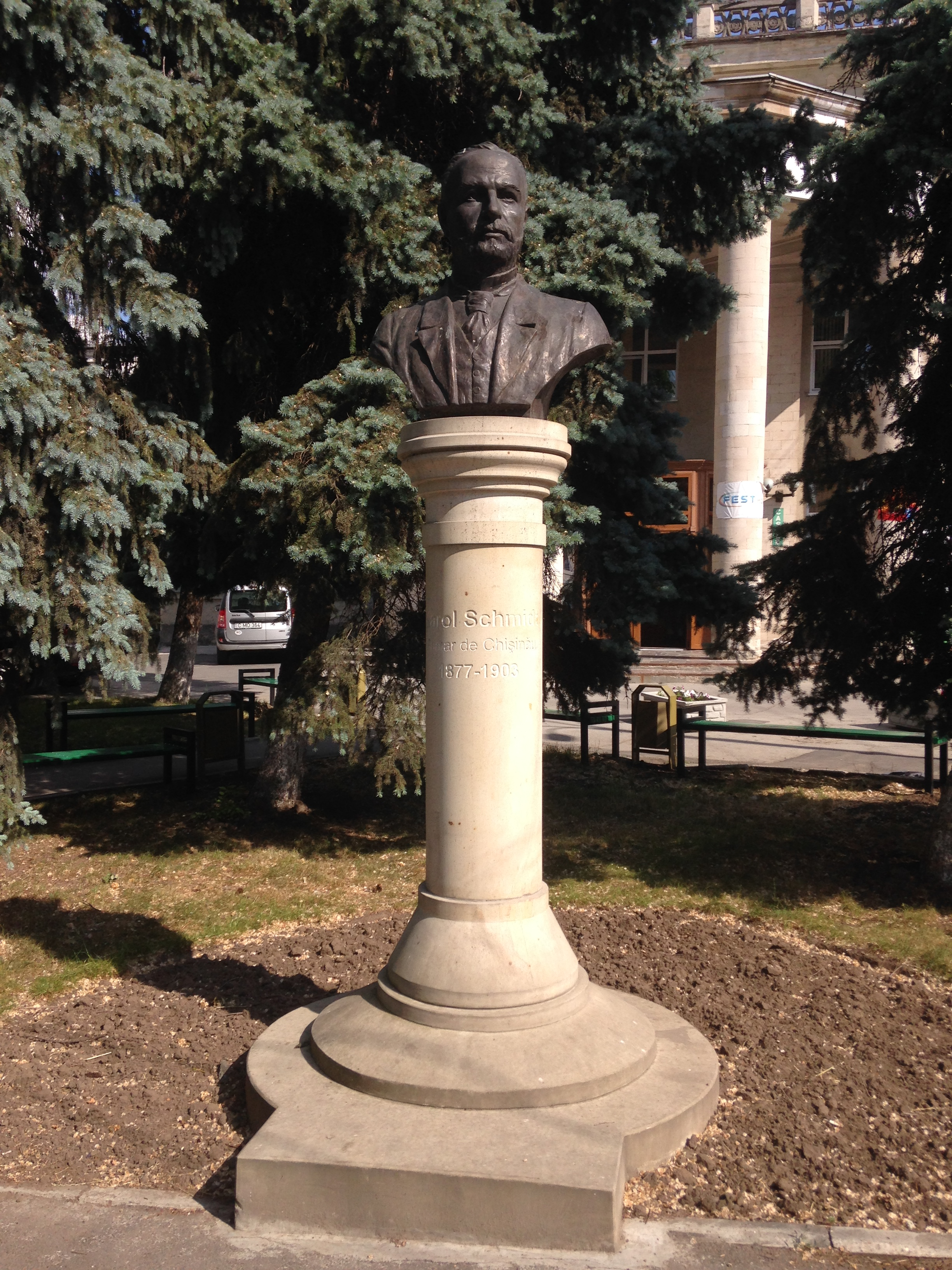
Bust in front of the National Philharmonic in Chișinău

Shmidt's popularity was such that he became the only mayor after whom the citizens renamed a street while he was still alive. In 1902, after 25 years as mayor of Kishinev, the former Gostinnaia street (Russian: Гостинная), on which he lived, was renamed Shmidt street (Russian: Шмидтовская). Today one part of the street is named after Metropolitan Varlaam and the other part after Metropolitan Dosoftei. The house in which Karl Shmidt lived has survived until today and is located on Metropolitan Varlaam street no. 84 (at the intersection with Mihai Eminescu str.). A memorial plaque in Romanian and German was installed on that building.

On 10 May 2014 a bust of Karl Shmidt by Moldavian sculptor Veaceslav Jiglitski was inaugurated in front of the National Philharmonic in Chișinău, near the house where the former mayor lived. All expenses were covered by the embassies of Germany and Poland.

The location of Karl Shmidt's grave is unknown. In 1937, a decade after his death, Gheorghe Bezviconi wrote in the magazine From our past that the grave of the great mayor was in poor condition and only a modest wooden cross was guarding him. Due to the wooden cross rotting away the location was lost and the grave can no longer be identified.

== Bibliography ==
- Kovarski, Brighita (1997). Enciclopedie. Chișinău. Chișinău: Editura Museum.
- Colesnic, Iurie (2005). Basarabia necunoscuta, vol. VI. Chișinău: Editura Museum.
- Brescanu, Iulian (2013). "Karl Schmidt – Geschichte eines deutschen Humanisten aus Bessarabien". Jahrbuch der Deutschen aus Bessarabien. 64: 201–204.
