= Anibal Dobjanski =

Romanian militiaman (1893–1994)

Hanibal Orațiu Dobjanski

Mayor of Chişinău
- In office 1941–1941
- Preceded by: Vladimir Cristi
- Succeeded by: Nicolae Costin

Personal details
- Born: 1893; Botoșani, Romania
- Died: 1994 (aged 100–101); Bucharest, Romania

Anibal Dobjanski (Hanibal Orațiu Dobjanski; 1893 – 1994) was a Romanian militiaman who was a colonel in the Romanian Army, former mayor of Chişinău in 1941, and was thus the last mayor of the Romanian administration in Moldovan.

== Biography ==
In the mid-19th century, the Dobjanski's family which is of polish origin has immigrated to Botoșani County (at the time of the Principality of Moldavia). Being from Botoșani, he graduated from the Boys' School no.1 Marchian, then the A. T. Laurian High School. He attended military studies at the Târgoviște Superior School of Cavalry, which he graduated with the rank of second lieutenant.

He is the nephew of Corneliu Dobjanski, a well-known lawyer and magistrate of that time at the Botoșani Court, who also owned an antique building, which is still preserved in the Botoșani.

Dobjanski took part in the war with Bulgaria of 1913 and participated in First World War, starting in 1916 with the rank of lieutenant.

In 1918, he came to Chișinău as a captain. He led the 3 Roșiori Regiment that was located in Chișinău, and then, led 2 Roșiori Regiment "Prunaru", and after a while he returned to the old regiment. For a time he was the Prefect of Lăpușna county.

In 1922, he decided to stay in Chișinău, being proactive in various activities: cultural, sports, elite and so on. He retired in time on the arrival of the Red Army, but in 1941 he returned to the army and was appointed as a Mayor of Chișinău, during that time the city was destroyed by bombings and Soviet commandos. He was released from the position of mayor of Chișinău on 30 September 1944.

Dobjanski wrote sketches, literary studies, lyrics and even wrote and edited a book of novels, called "Pages from life." He also published some memoirs about the poet Alexei Mateevici.

== Honours and awards ==
- The Order of the Crown of Romania, in the rank of Officer;
- The Order of the Star of Romania, in the rank of Cavalry;
- The Order of the Crown of Romania, in the rank of Grand Cross.

He donated all his medals got from the front (and not only) in the 80 ', to the Botoșani County Museum.
