= Mihai Furtună =

Moldovan politician (born 1955)

Mihai Furtună OR

Acting Mayor of Chișinău
- In office 18 April 2005 – 28 April 2005
- Preceded by: Serafim Urechean
- Succeeded by: Vasile Ursu (acting)

Personal details
- Born: 16 August 1955 (age 71)
- Education: Technical University of Moldova

Mihai Furtună (born 16 August 1955) is a Moldovan politician, deputy-mayor of Chișinău since September 2001. Mihai Furtună was acting Mayor of Chișinău for 10 days between 18–28 April 2005, after Serafim Urechean sacked.

== Education ==
- 1994–1996 - The Academy of Public Administration of the Government of the Republic of Moldova, specialized in International Relations, the degree in international relations;
- 1979–1985 - Polytechnic Institute of Chișinău, specialty Economics and organization of construction, qualification - economist engineer;
- 1972–1979 - The College of Constructions of Chișinău, specialty Industrial and civil construction, qualification - technician-builder.

== Professional experience ==
- September 2001 - January 2012 - Deputy Mayor of Chișinău municipality
- August 1999 - September 2001 - Praetor of the Botanica District
- October 1997 - August 1999 - Praetor of the Buiucani District
- 1990–1991 - Deputy Director of the Education Plant through courses of the Ministry of Construction
- 1980–1987 - Senior Master at the Education Plant through courses of the Ministry of Construction
- 1975–1980 - Master at the Education Plant through courses of the Ministry of Construction.

== Publications ==
- Traditional Administration Structures Establishing in Moldova, Public Administration, no. 4 (1998)
- The constitutionality and the evolution of the public authorities structures. The rule of law and the public administration (1999).
