= Mihai Severovan =

Moldovan politician (born 1947)

Mihai Severovan OR

Member of the Chișinău Municipal Council
- In office 25 May 2003 – 5 June 2011

Minister of Territorial Development, Construction and Public Works
- In office 24 January 1997 – 21 December 1999
- President: Petru Lucinschi
- Prime Minister: Ion Ciubuc; Ion Sturza
- Succeeded by: Vladimir Antosii (2005)

Minister of Communal Services and Exploitation of the Housing Fund
- In office 1 July 1992 – 24 January 1997
- President: Mircea Snegur; Petru Lucinschi
- Prime Minister: Andrei Sangheli

Chairman of the Chișinău Executive Committee
- In office 1990–1990
- Preceded by: Vladimir Dobrea
- Succeeded by: Nicolae Costin (as Mayor of Chișinău)

Personal details
- Born: 25 November 1947 (age 78) Gura Camencii, Moldavian SSR, Soviet Union
- Education: Technical University of Moldova

Mihai Severovan (born 25 November 1947) is a Moldovan politician.
