= Mayor of Chișinău =

Moldovan government official

- Primarul general al municipiului Chișinău
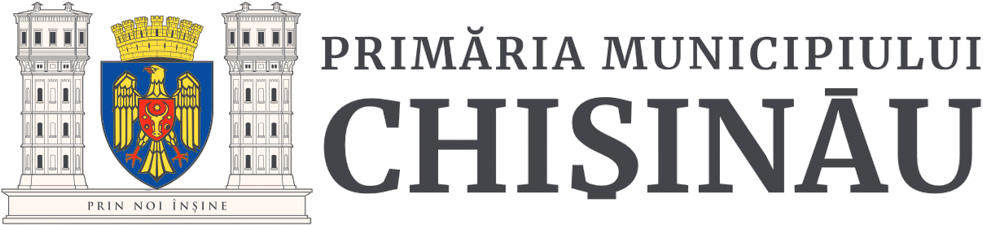

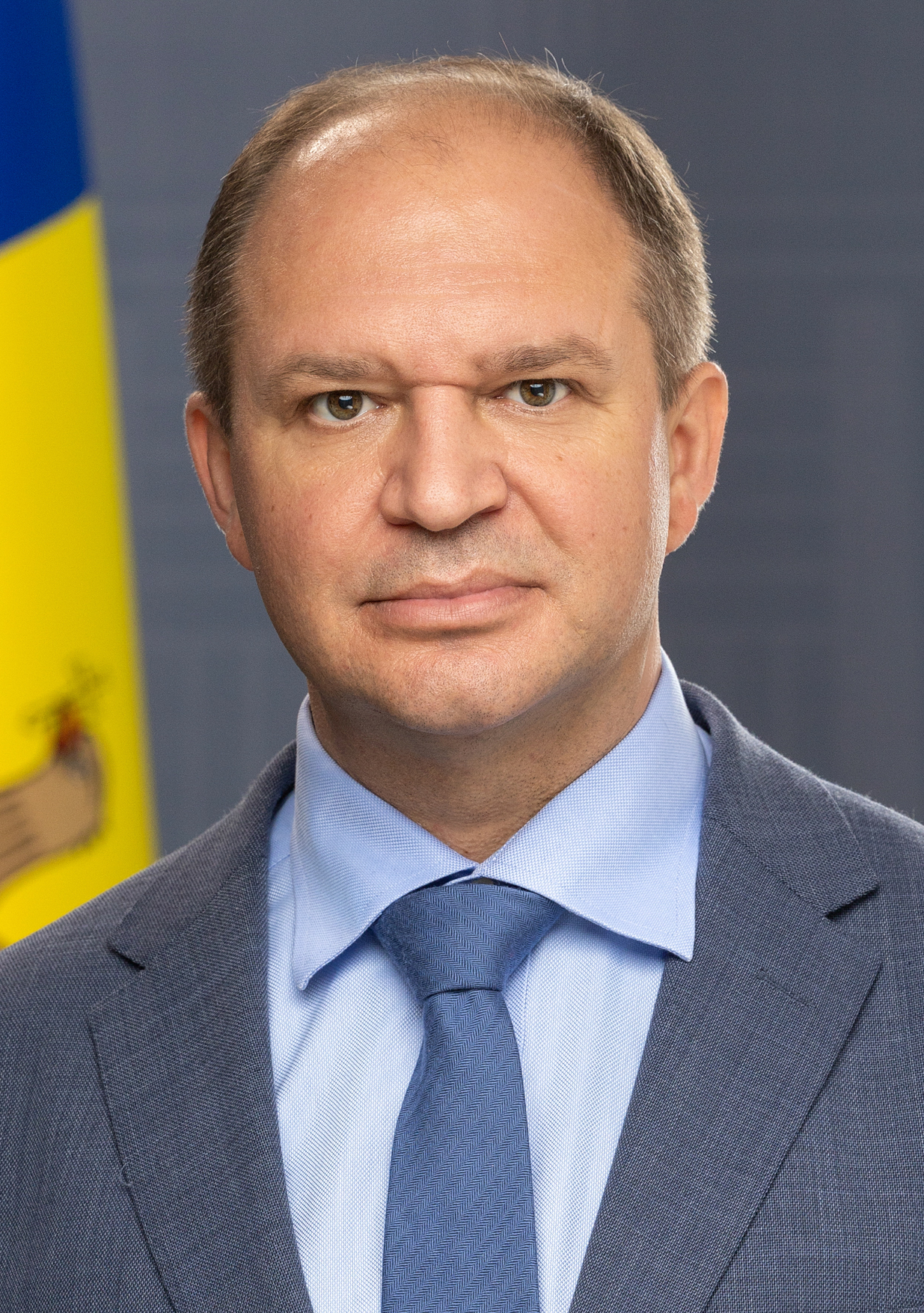
- Incumbent; Ion Ceban since 11 November 2019
- Style: Mister Mayor
- Member of: Chișinău Municipal Council
- Residence: Chișinău City Hall
- Seat: Chișinău
- Appointer: Direct popular vote
- Term length: 4 years
- Inaugural holder: Anghel Nour
- Deputy: Deputy Mayors
- Website: chisinau.md

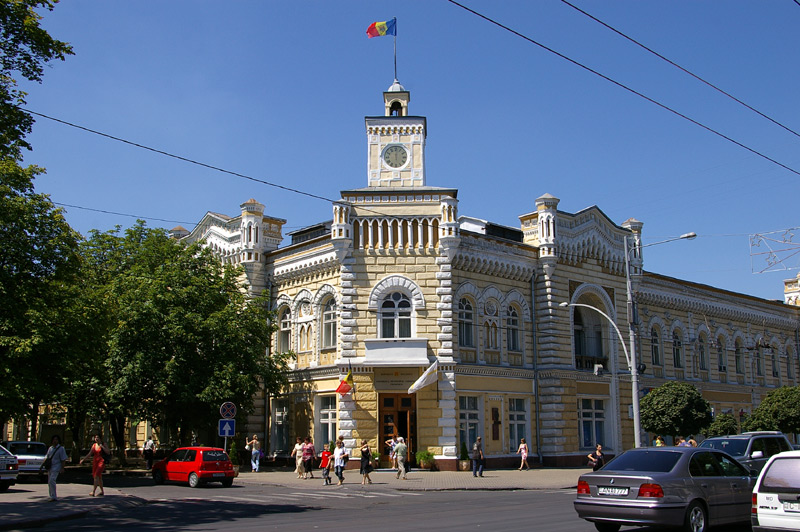
Chișinău City Hall, Central Chișinău

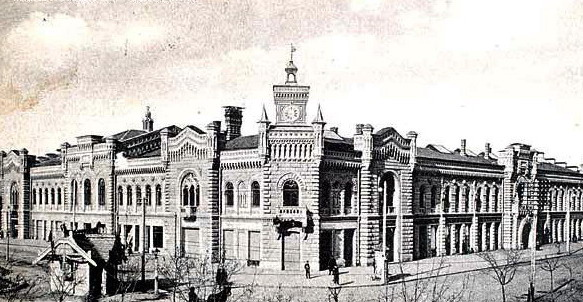
Chișinău City Hall around 1900

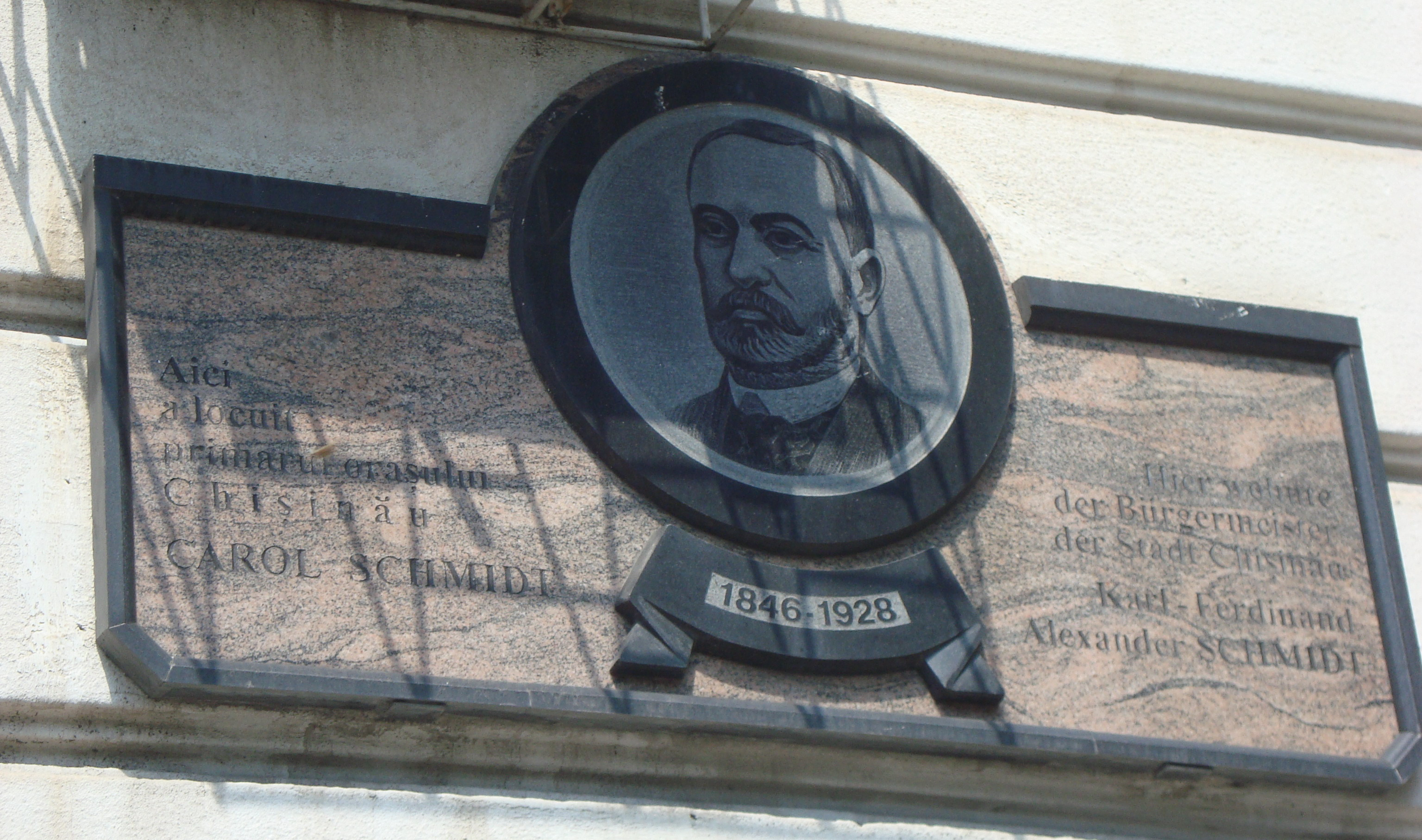
Carol Schmidt

The Mayor of Chișinău, officially the General Mayor of the Municipality of Chișinău (Romanian: Primar general al municipiul Chișinău), is the head of the executive branch of Chișinău's government and a member of the city's Municipal Council.

== History ==
The first mayor of Chișinău was Anghel Nour in 1817. In 1941, the office was abolished. After the end of the Soviet era and the re-establishment of the office in 1990, Nicolae Costin became the first democratically elected mayor.

== List of mayors ==
Throughout the passing of time, the mayors of the city of Chișinău have been the following ones:

=== Russian Empire ===
Nº	Mayor	From	Until	Notes
1	Anghel Nour	1817	1821	First mayor of the city
2	Dimitrie Lovcinski	1821	1831	
3	Stavru Dimu	1831	1833	
(2)	Dimitrie Lovcinski	1834	1836	Second time serving as mayor
4	Pantelimon I. Sinadino	1837	1839	
4	Pantelimon I. Sinadino	1840	1842	Second time serving as mayor
(2)	Dimitrie Lovcinski	1843	1845	Second time serving as mayor
5	Dimitrie Durdufi	1846	1848	
6	Dimitrie Mincu	1849	1854	
7	Anghel Nicolau	1855	1858	
(6)	Dimitrie Mincu	1858	1860	Second time serving as mayor
(6)	Dimitrie Mincu	1861	1866	Third time serving as mayor
8	Adam Krijanovski	1867	1869	
9	Pavel Gumalic	1870	1871	
10	Clemente Șumanski	1871	1877	
11	Carol Schmidt	1877	1903	First ethnic German mayor of the city (more specifically Bessarabian German)
12	Leopold Siținski	1904	1905	
13	Pantelimon V. Sinadino	1905	1910	National Liberal Party (PNL)
14	Iulian Levinski	1910	1917	

=== Moldavian Democratic Republic ===
Nº	Mayor	From	Until	Notes
15	Alexander Schmidt	1917	1918	Second ethnic German mayor of the city (more specifically Bessarabian German), son of Carol Schmidt

=== Kingdom of Romania ===
Nº	Mayor	From	Until	Notes
16	Vladimir Herța	1918	1919	National Liberal Party (PNL)
17	Teodor Cojocaru	1919	1920	National Liberal Party (PNL)
(14)	Iulian Levinski	1920	1922	Second time serving as mayor
18	Vasile Bârcă	1922	1923	National Liberal Party (PNL)
19	Gherman Pântea	1923	1923	National Liberal Party (PNL)
–	Yehuda Leib Tsirelson (acting/ad interim)	1923	1923	Acting mayor
20	Nicolae Bivol	1923	1924	National Liberal Party (PNL)
(18)	Vasile Bârcă	1924	1925	National Liberal Party (PNL)
(20)	Nicolae Bivol	1925	1926	National Liberal Party (PNL)
21	Sebastian Teodorescu	1926	1927	
(19)	Gherman Pântea	1927	1928	National Liberal Party (PNL)
22	Ion Negrescu	1928	1931	
23	Constantin Ionescu	1931	1932	
(19)	Gherman Pântea	1932	1932	National Liberal Party (PNL)
24	Dimitrie Bogos	1932	1933	National Peasants' Party (PNȚ)
25	Ion Costin	1933	1937	
–	Alexandru Sibirski (acting/ad interim)	1937	1938	Acting mayor
26	Constantin Dardan	1938	1938	
27	Reindhold Scheibler	1938	1938	Third ethnic German (more specifically Bessarabian German) mayor of the city
28	Vladimir Cristi	1938	1940	National Liberal Party (PNL)
29	Anibal Dobjanski	1941	1941	Bessarabian Polish

=== Moldavian SSR ===
Chairmen of the Chișinău City Executive Committee.

Nº	Chairman	From	Until	Party
1	Nicolae Vizitei	1944	1946	Moldavian Communist Party under the All-Union Communist Party (bolsheviks)
2	Dmitry Smirnov	1946	1950	Moldavian Communist Party under the All-Union Communist Party (bolsheviks)
3	Konstantin Sablin	1950	1953	Moldavian Communist Party under the All-Union Communist Party (bolsheviks)
4	Anatoly Maryutin	1953	1955	Communist Party of Moldavia under the Communist Party of the Soviet Union
5	Boris Tanashevsky	1955	1959	Communist Party of Moldavia under the Communist Party of the Soviet Union
6	Macar Godoba	1959	1961	Communist Party of Moldavia under the Communist Party of the Soviet Union
7	Mihail Dieur	1961	1966	Communist Party of Moldavia under the Communist Party of the Soviet Union
8	Anatoly Damaskin	1966	1970	Communist Party of Moldavia under the Communist Party of the Soviet Union
9	Ivan Kuskevich	1970	1973	Communist Party of Moldavia under the Communist Party of the Soviet Union
10	Vladimir Zakharov	1973	1975	Communist Party of Moldavia under the Communist Party of the Soviet Union
11	Nicolae Uzun	1975	1981	Communist Party of Moldavia under the Communist Party of the Soviet Union
12	Vladimir Semyonov	1981	1985	Communist Party of Moldavia under the Communist Party of the Soviet Union
13	Mihail Platon	1985	1987	Communist Party of Moldavia under the Communist Party of the Soviet Union
14	Ion Guțu	1987	1989	Communist Party of Moldavia under the Communist Party of the Soviet Union
15	Vladimir Dobrea	1989	1990	Communist Party of Moldavia under the Communist Party of the Soviet Union
16	Mihai Severovan	1990		Communist Party of Moldavia under the Communist Party of the Soviet Union

=== Republic of Moldova ===
Nº	Mayor	From	Until	Party	Election
30	Nicolae Costin	1990	9 August 1994	Popular Front (FPM)	—
31	Serafim Urechean	9 August 1994	18 April 2005	Our Moldova Alliance/Liberal Democratic Party (AMN/PLDM)	1995; 1999; 2003
–	Mihai Furtună (acting/ad interim)	18 April 2005	28 April 2005	Independent	—
–	Vasile Ursu (acting/ad interim)	28 April 2005	25 January 2007	Party of Communists (PCRM)	2005
–	Veaceslav Iordan (acting/ad interim)	25 January 2007	18 June 2007	Party of Communists (PCRM)	—
32	Dorin Chirtoacă	18 June 2007	28 July 2017	Liberal Party (PL)	2007; 2011; 2015
–	Nistor Grozavu (acting/ad interim)	4 August 2017	6 November 2017	Liberal Party (PL)	—
–	Silvia Radu (acting/ad interim)	6 November 2017	25 April 2018	Independent	—
–	Ruslan Codreanu (acting/ad interim)	25 April 2018	4 July 2019	European People's Party (PPEM)	—
–	Adrian Talmaci (acting/ad interim)	4 July 2019	8 October 2019	Liberal Party (PL)	—
33	Andrei Năstase	8 October 2019	10 October 2019	Dignity and Truth Platform (PPDA)	2018
–	Adrian Talmaci (acting/ad interim)	10 October 2019	4 November 2019	Liberal Party (PL)	—
(33)	Andrei Năstase	4 November 2019	5 November 2019	Dignity and Truth Platform (PPDA)	—
–	Adrian Talmaci (acting/ad interim)	5 November 2019	11 November 2019	Liberal Party (PL)	—
34	Ion Ceban	11 November 2019	Incumbent	National Alternative Movement (MAN)	2019; 2023

== See also ==
- Timeline of Chișinău
