= Dimitrie Mincu =

Mayor of Chișinău
- In office 1849–1854
- Monarch: Nicholas I
- Preceded by: Dimitrie Durdufi
- Succeeded by: Anghel Nicolau
- In office 1858–1860
- Monarch: Alexander II
- Preceded by: Anghel Nicolau
- Succeeded by: Adam Krijanovski
- In office 1861–1866

Dimitrie Mincu (russian Дмитрий Кириллович Минков; Bulgarian Димитър Кирилов Минков) was a Bessarabian politician, who was the Mayor of Chișinău in 1849—1854 and then in 1858–1860 and in 1861–1866.

== Biography ==
The father of Dimitrie Mincu (Minkov), Chiril (Кирилл), also known as Kalceo (Калчо), was a well-known Bulgarian merchant from Chișinău, who came to Bessarabia from Kalofer. He donated big money for the construction of the cathedral.

Dimitrie Mincu became a judge in 1846, and between 1849 and 1854 led Chișinău in his first term. Before being re-elected as mayor in 1858, between 1854 and 1858 Chișinău's mayor was Anghel Nicolau, who was married to Dimitrie Mincu's sister.

The Mincu's governing is associated with the development of urban trade, active improvement of the city. Thanks to him, cobblestone streets appeared in the city. In his honor, one of the paved streets of Chișinău, by the beginning of the World War II was called Minkowska (now George Coșbuc Street).

In 1848, Adam Krijanovski took the place of Dimitrie Mincu.
