= Iulian Levinski =

Bessarabian politician (1859–1923)

Mayor of Chişinău
- In office 1910–1917
- Preceded by: Pantelimon V. Sinadino
- Succeeded by: Alexander Schmidt
- In office 1920–1922
- Preceded by: Teodor Cojocaru
- Succeeded by: Vasile Bârcă

Personal details
- Born: 1859
- Died: 1923 (aged 63–64)
- Relations: Alexandru Cotruţă (father in law)

Iulian Levinski (1859–1923) was a Bessarabian politician, mayor of Chişinău between 1910–1917 and 1920–1922.

== Biography ==
Iulian Levinski worked as industrial inspectors. His father in law was Alexandru Cotruţă (1828–1905).
