= Anghel Nour =

Bessarabian politician

1st Mayor of Chişinău
- In office 1817–1821
- Monarch: Alexander I
- Succeeded by: Dimitrie Lovcinski

Military service
- Branch/service: Imperial Russian Army
- Rank: Captain
- Battles/wars: Russo-Turkish War (1806–1812)

Anghel Nour was a Bessarabian politician. He served as the first mayor of Chişinău between 1817 and 1821.

== Biography ==
Angel Nour was born in a family of Moldavian small-local nobles. He participated in the Russo-Turkish War (1806–1812), representing the Russian Empire, rising through the ranks to eventually become captain.

In 1817, for the first time, the elections to the Chișinău City Duma were held. At meetings of the Moldavian, Russian, Bulgarian, Greek and Jewish societies, one representative was elected. The first mayor was elected by the Duma - the "Moldavian service captain" Angel Nour.

He was actively engaged in the improvement of Chișinău, which was ceded to Russia in 1812 after the first Russian annexation of Bessarabia.
