= Veaceslav Iordan =

Moldovan politician (born 1966)

Veaceslav Iordan OR

Acting Mayor of Chișinău
- In office 25 January 2007 – 18 June 2007
- Preceded by: Vasile Ursu (acting)
- Succeeded by: Dorin Chirtoacă

Deputy Mayor of Chișinău
- In office 13 April 2006 – 25 January 2007

Member of the Chișinău Municipal Council
- In office 25 May 2003 – 13 April 2006

Personal details
- Born: 12 June 1966 (age 60) Chircăiești, Moldavian SSR, Soviet Union
- Citizenship: Moldova
- Party: Party of Communists of the Republic of Moldova
- Education: Academy of Construction, Kharkiv
- Occupation: Politician

Veaceslav Iordan (born 12 June 1966) is a Moldovan politician who served as interim Mayor of Chișinău from January to June 2007.

== Biography ==
Veaceslav Iordan was born on 12 June 1966 in the village of Chircăieşti, Căușeni District. After graduating from secondary school in his native town in 1983, became a student at the Faculty of Engineering of the Academy of Construction in Kharkiv. After a year of study he did his mandatory military service in the Soviet Army from 1984 to 1986. In 1986 he returned to the Academy where he continued his studies, obtaining a diploma in engineering. He began work as an engineer at the engineering department of Hotel Inturist from 1993 to 1998. In 1998 he was employed as head of maintenance services for Railways of Moldova. In 2000, he was appointed as deputy director general for social and capital construction in the same company.

In 2003, he was elected on party lists of Moldova to the Chișinău municipal council, then on 13 April 2006, was elected Deputy Mayor of Chișinău. In the new position, he coordinated infrastructure issues household utilities, roads, transport, public lighting, funeral services, and the village green.

== Appointment as Interim General Mayor of Chișinău ==
In 2003 Veaceslav Iordan was elected as municipal councilor of Chișinău on the lists of the Party of Communists of the Republic of Moldova, and then on April 13, 2006, was elected as deputy mayor of Chișinău municipality. In the new position, he coordinated the problems related to the communal household infrastructure, roads, transport, public lighting, funeral services, green spaces and was also responsible for the activity of "Termocom" JSC, "Apa-canal Chișinău" JSC, CET-1, CET-2, "Chișinău-Gaz ".

The appointment of the acting interim mayor of Chișinău, Vasile Ursu, as minister came just four months before the general local elections in May, elections in which the interim mayor of Chișinău had announced the decision not to run. Vasile Ursu has resigned as mayor of Chișinău since January 25, 2007, and has empowered deputy mayor Veaceslav Iordan to perform the duties of the acting interim mayor of Chișinău.

According to the Regulation regarding the activity of the municipal self-administration bodies, the right on empowering of the acting interim general mayor of the Chișinău municipality has the head of the administration of Chișinău. According to the Infotag Agency, at the extraordinary meeting of the Chișinău Municipal Council (CMC), several councilors have questioned the right of the acting interim mayor to appoint his successor, stating that this is the prerogative of the Council.

In 2005, for special work merits, Veaceslav Iordan was decorated with the Order of the Republic.

In a Top of the most influential Moldovans made up in 2006, Veaceslav Iordan ranked 10th, while interim mayor Vasile Ursu ranked 19th.

At the local elections on June 3, 2007, Veaceslav Iordan obtained only 27.62% of the votes, with only three percent more than the first candidate Dorin Chirtoacă, and in the second round held on June 17, 2007, given to the coalition of the majority of the opposition parties, he obtained only 38.83% of the votes and lost the elections.

On August 1, 2007, the Government of the Republic of Moldova appointed Veaceslav Iordan as general director of the "Apele Moldovei" Agency.
