= Svetlana Cebotari =

Moldovan politician (born 1969)

Minister of Health, Labour and Social Protection
- In office 10 January 2018 – 19 September 2018
- President: Igor Dodon
- Prime Minister: Pavel Filip
- Preceded by: Stela Grigoraș
- Succeeded by: Silvia Radu

Personal details
- Born: 7 August 1969 (age 57) Chişinău, Moldavian SSR, Soviet Union
- Education: Nicolae Testemițanu State University of Medicine and Pharmacy

Svetlana Cebotari (born 7 August 1969) is a Moldovan politician. She served as Minister of Health, Labour and Social Protection from 10 January 2018 to 19 September 2018 in the cabinet of Prime Minister Pavel Filip.

Political offices
Preceded by Stela Grigoraș	Minister of Health, Labour and Social Protection; 2018–2018	Succeeded by Silvia Radu
