= Dimitrie Lovcinski =

Bessarabian politician

Mayor of Chişinău
- In office 1825–1830
- Preceded by: Anghel Nour
- Succeeded by: Stavru Dimu
- In office 1834–1836
- Preceded by: Stavru Dimu
- Succeeded by: Pantelimon I. Sinadino
- In office 1843–1845
- Preceded by: Pantelimon I. Sinadino
- Succeeded by: Dimitrie Durdufi

Dimitrie Lovcinski (Russian: Дмитрий Петрович Ловчинский, romanized: Dmitry Petrovich Lovchinsky) was a Bessarabian politician. He served as the second, fourth and sixth mayor of Chişinău (Russian: Городской голова, "Head of the city") between 1825 and 1830, 1834-1836 and 1843-1845 respectively, when Bessarabia was a part of the Russian Empire. During his first tenure, Alexander Pushkin wrote The Gabrieliad and started Eugene Onegin while being in exile in Chişinău, and during Lovcinski's second tenure as mayor the Nativity Cathedral was opened in the city.
