= Alexander Schmidt (politician) =

Bessarabian politician (1879–1954)

- An undated photo of Alexander K. Schmidt

Mayor of Chișinău
- In office 1917–1918
- Preceded by: Iulian Levinski
- Succeeded by: Vladimir Herța

Personal details
- Born: 1879 Chișinău, Bessarabia Governorate, Russian Empire
- Died: 1954 (aged 74–75) Tashkent, Uzbek SSR, USSR
- Party: Popular Socialist
- Relations: Carol Schmidt (father)
- Education: Saint Vladimir Imperial University of Kiev
- Occupation: politician, professor
- Profession: lawyer, economist

Alexander Carol Schmidt (Romanian: Alexander Karlovici Schmidt, Russian: Александр Карлович Шмидт; 1879–1954) was a Bessarabian-born Imperial Russian, Moldavian and, later Soviet, politician, economist, lawyer and academic. He was the last Tsarist mayor of Chișinău, between 1917 and 1918.

== Biography ==
Alexander Schmidt was born on 1879 in Kishinev, at that time part of the Bessarabia Governorate. A Bessarabian German, he was a son of Carol Schmidt, who was serving as mayor of Kishinev when he was born, and Maria Cristi. The Schmidt family was part of the Russian nobility. He was raised into the Eastern Orthodox faith. Alexander Schmidt took part in the 1905-1907 Russian uprising and he was arrested, but he was released after his father's intervention. He then studied law and economics at the Saint Vladimir Imperial University of Kiev.

A member of the Popular Socialist Party, he became the mayor of Kishinev in 1917, during the February Revolution. After the establishment of the Moldavian Democratic Republic, he gave the inaugural speech of the first day of existence of the Sfatul Țării. An ardent Russian nationalist, he opposed the 1918 Romanian military intervention in Bessarabia. After the Union of Bessarabia with Romania, he proclaimed himself an enemy of Romania and, together with his father, Carol Schmidt, as well as with other Russian-Bessarabian nobles and politicians (including Aleksandr Krupensky, Vladimir Tsyganko or Mark Slonim), he founded in Odessa the Society for the Salvation of Bessarabia. The Society, led by Krupensky and Schmidt, received funds from Russian nobles and organized terror attacks in Bessarabia against the Romanian troops. The war minister of the Moldavian Democratic Republic, Gherman Pântea, advised the Romanian Army to execute Schmidt and Tsyganko. In a memo submitted on November 8–10, 1918 to the ambassadors and military attaches of the Entente, established in Iași, by representatives of the former Kishinev Municipal Council headed by Schmidt himself, it was noted that the Council never had any doubts about the fact that the international conference will give Bessarabia the possibility of expressing its will through a plebiscite. Alexander Schmidt and Aleksandr Krupensky published numerous brochures and interviews in Paris and London in which they tried to prove the Russian character of Bessarabia. They led a delegation of Russian politicians, landowners and nobles to the 1919-1920 Paris peace conference that strongly argued against the international recognition of the union of Bessarabia with Romania. Among other things, it was mentioned that the Romanian administration would have forced the province's population to take part in Romanian elections, who would have been absolutely foreign to the Russian-speaking population of Bessarabia, "to make the Entente believe that the population of Bessarabia accepted forced Romanian occupation". Representatives of this so-called Bessarabian delegation insisted on the need to organize in the territory of Bessarabia of a plebiscite, stating that the population who could not write in Romanian she was obliged to complete the ballot papers in Romanian. Among the anti-Romanian propaganda promoted by Schmidt is the myth of the "Romanian Gendarme, which beats the Moldovan peasant", which was later used by the Soviet propaganda against Romania.

After failing to prevent the unification of Bessarabia with Romania, Schmidt settled in the Ukrainian Soviet Socialist Republic. He became an active contributor to the Krasnaya Bessarabia magazine. From 1924 to 1930 he worked on the State Planning Committee of the Ukrainian SSR. He was then the head of the finance department of the Kharkov Financial and Economic Institute. During the great purge, he was arrested and imprisoned in a GULAG, but was later released and settled in Tashkent, the capital of the Uzbek SSR. In 1946 he became a professor at the Tashkent Financial and Economic Institute.

Alexander K. Schmidt died in 1954 and was buried in Tashkent.

== Gallery ==
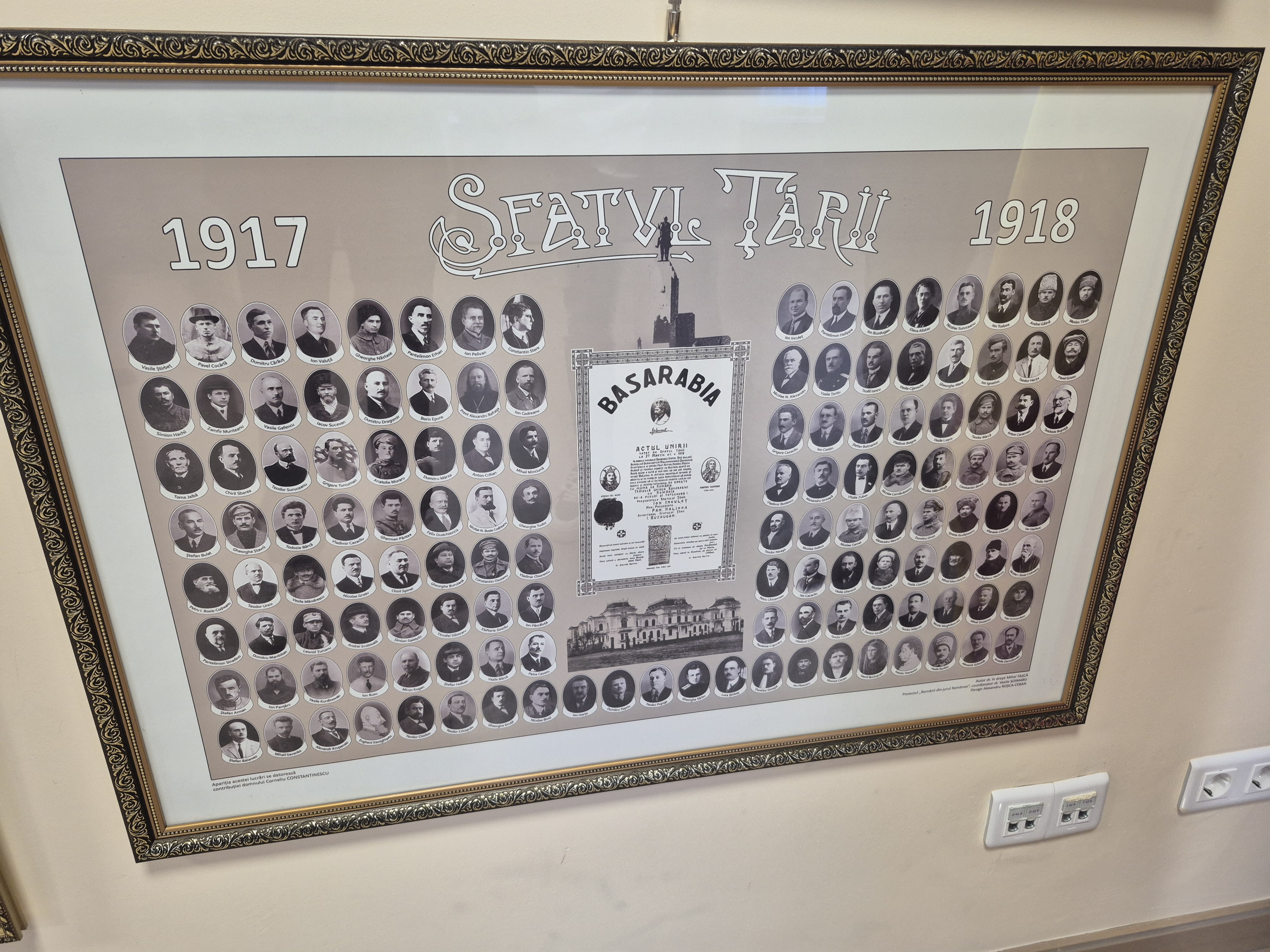
Sfatul Țării
