= Grozești, Nisporeni =

Grozești
- Village
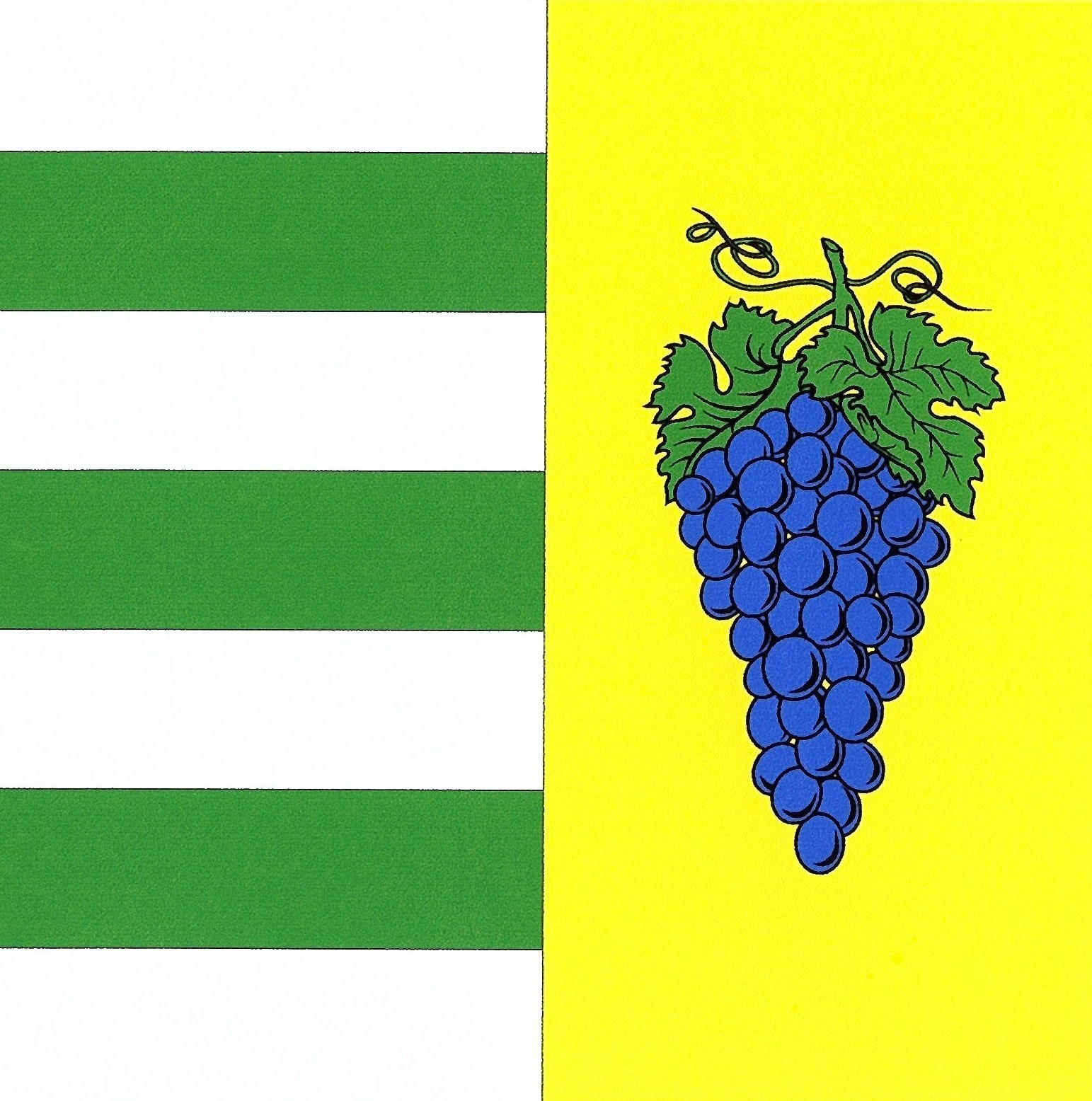
- Flag

- Location in Moldova
- Coordinates: 47°00′N 28°05′E
- Country: Moldova
- District: Nisporeni District

Population (2014 census)
  - Total: 1,827
- Time zone: UTC+2 (EET)
  - Summer (DST): UTC+3 (EEST)

Grozești is a village in Nisporeni District, Moldova. Right across the Prut river, which separates Moldova from Romania, is located the Romanian village of the same name. The two villages were split in 1940 after the Soviet Union annexed Bessarabia, which was then part of Romania.

== Notable people ==
- Dimitrie Bogos (1889-1946), politician, mayor of Chișinău
