= Vasile Ursu =

Moldovan politician

Vasile Ursu OR

Deputy Minister of Construction and Territorial Development
- In office 22 October 2008 – 4 November 2009
- President: Vladimir Voronin; Mihai Ghimpu (acting)
- Prime Minister: Zinaida Greceanîi; Vitalie Pîrlog (acting); Vlad Filat
- Minister: Vladimir Baldovici

Minister of Transport and Roads Infrastructure
- In office 23 January 2007 – 1 October 2008
- President: Vladimir Voronin
- Prime Minister: Vasile Tarlev; Zinaida Greceanîi
- Preceded by: Miron Gagauz
- Succeeded by: Anatol Șalaru (2009)

Acting Mayor of Chișinău
- In office 28 April 2005 – 23 January 2007
- Preceded by: Mihai Furtună (acting)
- Succeeded by: Veaceslav Iordan (acting)

Member of the Moldovan Parliament
- In office 17 April 1990 – 27 February 1994
- Constituency: Chișinău

Personal details
- Born: 1 August 1948 (age 77) Ratuș, Moldavian SSR, Soviet Union
- Citizenship: Moldova
- Party: Liberal Democratic Party of Moldova

Vasile Ursu (born 1 August 1948) is a Moldovan engineer and politician, MP at the first Parliament of the Republic of Moldova in 1990-1994, acting interim general mayor of Chișinău in 2005-2007 and minister of transport and road management for 2007-2008. In 2008-2009 he held the position of Deputy Minister of Construction and Territory Development.

Vasile Ursu is one of the 278 delegates of the first parliament of the former Moldovan SSR (later known as the Republic of Moldova), who voted the Declaration of Independence of the Republic of Moldova on 27 August 1991.

== Biography ==
Vasile Ursu was born on 1 August 1948 in the Ratuș village of Criuleni District, in the large family of a ploughman. After graduating from the school in his native village, he attended the courses of the Chișinău College of Construction (1964-1968) and then, graduated the Technical University of Moldova (1969-1976), with the diploma of construction engineer.

He then worked as an engineer-builder at the Design Institute of the Ministry of Population Social Service in the MSSR (February - July 1968), then, he did the military service in the Soviet Army, in Riga (July 1968 - June 1969). Returned to the MSSR, he worked as a construction site manager at the "Spetstroimehanization" (1969-1972) and "Chisiniovstroi" (1972-1977), the head engineer and the head of the Construction Directorate no.52 of the "Jilstroi" Trust in Chișinău (February 1977 - April 1981).

He was very active within the Communist Party of Moldavia, where he performed the duties of head of the industry and transport section at the Frunze District Committee of the Communist Party of Moldova (April 1981 - October 1983) and then, as an instructor at the section of construction and communal household of the Central Committee of the Communist Party of Moldova (October 1983 - November 1986). Also, between 1982 and 1993, he was a member of the Chișinău District and City Council.

In parallel, he attended the political activist courses at the Kyiv Higher Party School (1984-1986). Returning to the Republic of Moldova, he was appointed the head of the Executive Committee of the Ciocana Soviet district (1986-1991).

After the proclamation of the independence of the Republic of Moldova in 1991, he was praetor of the Ciocana sector in Chișinău municipality (1991-1993), first deputy mayor of Chișinău municipality (1993-1999); later praetor of the Râșcani sector (1999-2003) of the Chișinău municipality.

In parallel, for 1990-1993 he was also a Member of the Parliament of the Republic of Moldova. Being elected in the first Parliament of the Republic of Moldova for 1990–1993, Vasile Ursu voted the Declaration of Independence.

For 1995-1999 he worked in the economic field as first vice-president of the "ASCOM-GRUP" Association S.A. (1995) and then, the president of the “COMCON-VM” S.A. Association (1995-1999).

== Acting mayor of Chișinău municipality ==
Between 2003 and 2005, Vasile Ursu was deputy mayor of Chișinău. On 18 April 2005 the general mayor of Chisinau, Serafim Urechean, who had been elected as an MP in the Parliament of the Republic of Moldova, decided to resign as mayor of Chișinău in favor of the MP chair in the Parliament of the Republic of Moldova (RM). The Acting Mayor was appointed Deputy Mayor Mihai Furtună.

On 26 April 2005, 10 days after, the appointed acting interim mayor, Mihai Furtună was hospitalized, signed the disposition to transfer the acting interim mayor position to the deputy mayor Vasile Ursu, but only for the period of illness and not for an unlimited period.

A part of the Chișinău municipality councilors have stated that the Vasile Ursu's appointment for the position of the acting general mayor of Chișinău municipality was in contravention of the legislation in force. Normally, according to the Law on public administration, if the appointed acting general mayor resigns, only the Chișinău City Council is entitled, within 5 days, to appoint another acting mayor. In this way, I support the councilors of the fraction from the Our Moldova Alliance the non-affiliated councilors and some counselors from other factions which stated that Vasile Ursu "has seized power through blackmail and coercion".

On 10 and 24 July 2005 elections were held for the position of mayor, but they were invalidated due to the low attendance at the polls below 30%.

Vasile Ursu was an independent candidate in the elections of 27 November and 11 December 2005, being supported by the Party of Communists of the Republic of Moldova for the position of the general mayor of Chișinău municipality, but although he got 46.66% of the votes, respectively 52.91%, the election was invalidated due to the low attendance at the polls (22.62% of the voters voted).

In this situation, the decision was made to establish a moratorium on the organization of new elections, and the capital's management being provided by the interim mayor by the beginning of 2007.

== Minister of Transport ==
On 23 January 2007 the President of the Republic of Moldova, Vladimir Voronin, signed the decrees of revocation of Miron Gagauz from the position of Minister of Transport and Road Management, according to the request submitted, and to appoint Vasile Ursu for this position, who was at that time the acting general mayor of Chișinău municipality.

The new minister said his main priority would be to repair the roads. "Of course, roads are the most important for me. To paraphrase Dan Spătaru's song I would say - All our roads will ever be repaired".

Vasile Ursu's appointment as a minister came just four months before the general local elections held in May, elections in which the interim mayor of Chișinău announced his decision not to run for office. Vasile Ursu has resigned as mayor of Chișinău since 25 January 2007 and has delegated the deputy mayor Veaceslav Iordan to carry out the position of acting general mayor of Chișinău.

He kept the position as minister at the new government formed by Zinaida Greceanîi on 31 March 2008. Following a government decision, the Ministry of Transport and Road Management was dissolved and Vasile Ursu resigned from the office on 24 September 2008.

On 22 October 2008 Minister Vladimir Baldovici appointed Vasile Ursu as deputy minister of constructions and territory development.

== Personal life ==
He is married and has two children. He speaks Russian fluently and French with the dictionary.

== Distinctions and medals ==
Vasile Ursu is decorated with the Medal "Civic Merit" (1996), "Order of Honor" (2006) and Order of the Republic (2012). He also received the honorary title of "Man emeritus" (on 1 August 2008).

== See also ==
- First Tarlev Cabinet
- Second Tarlev Cabinet
