= Ruslan Codreanu =

Moldovan politician and manager (born 1980)

President of the People Power Party
- Incumbent
- Assumed office 28 February 2021

Acting Mayor of Chișinău
- In office 25 April 2018 – 4 July 2019
- Deputy: Nistor Grozavu
- Preceded by: Silvia Radu (acting)
- Succeeded by: Adrian Talmaci (acting)

Deputy Mayor of Chișinău
- In office 6 November 2017 – 25 April 2018
- Succeeded by: Angela Cutasevici

Personal details
- Born: 15 October 1980 (age 45) Chișinău, Moldavian SSR, Soviet Union
- Education: Babeș-Bolyai University (UBB); Hertie School of Governance
- Profession: Politician

Ruslan Codreanu (born 15 October 1980) is a Moldovan politician and manager who was the acting mayor of Chișinău until early July, 2019. Between 2004 and 2008 he worked at the Ministry of Economy and Commerce. Between 2008 and 2015 he was a council at State council of government. Since 2015 he was a municipal council in Chișinău. In November 2007, he became deputy mayor of Chișinău. On 30 August Codreanu announced on Facebook that he would be running for the post of mayor of Chișinău as an independent candidate.

== Biography ==
- 2013–2014: Hertie School of Governance, Berlin, Germany; Executive Certificate in public management
- 1998–2002: Babeș-Bolyai University, Cluj-Napoca, Romania; Graduate Diploma in history and economy of the European Union

== Professional experience ==
- July, 2015–November, 2017: Chișinău Municipal Council; municipal councilor, president of the PPEM faction;
- March, 2015–present European Institute of Politics and Reforms; expert in the reform of Chișinău City Hall;
- March, 2008–March, 2015: State Chancellery of the Government of the Republic of Moldova; head of the Directorate-General; Policy Co-ordination, External Assistance and Central Public Administration Reform since January, 2013;
- March, 2004–March, 2008: Ministry of Economy and Infrastructure; head of the Economic Adjustments Division in the European Integration Process (2007–2008);
- 2006–2007: Deputy head of the Economic Adjustments Division in the European Integration Process;
- 2005–2006: Principal specialist in the Economic Adjustments Division in the European Integration Process.

== Professional internships and conferences ==
- International seminar "Contemporary Management in Public Administration", Jerusalem, Israel;
- Training program "Regional Center for Public Administration Reform for Network Members", Turin, Italy;
- International seminar "Central Public Administration Reform", Berlin, Germany.

== Publications ==
- "Civil society and the fight against corruption: Promoting effective anti-corruption policies by reforming the public sector and law enforcement authorities
- "Thematic analysis on the implementation of the commitments of the Republic of Moldova in the field of Agriculture and Rural Development in accordance with the EU-Moldova Association Agreement (October 2014 - March 2016)"
