= Pavel Gumalic =

Russian politician

Mayor of Chișinău
- In office 1870–1871
- Preceded by: Adam Krijanovski
- Succeeded by: Clemente Șumanski

Pavel Gumalic (in Russian: Павел Гумалик) was a mayor of Chișinău between 1870 and 1871.

== Biography ==
Pavel Gumalic was born into a Greek family. He was the poruchik who retired from the army.

In 1870 he was elected to the position of mayor of Chișinău, succeeding Adam Krijanovski. In the short time of his administration, Gumalic built a railway station, started to build a water tower and laid down a water pipe, and laid the church of the Great Martyr Panteleimon, according to the project designed by the architect Alexandru Bernardazzi.

In 1870, the city position was adopted, introducing a classless city council and city administration. Using his power, Gumalic removed from the list of the city duma questionable candidates and introduced the people who were loyal to him. The Chișinău voters which became scandalized by this gesture demanded the resignation of the mayor and the cancellation of the election results. Gumalic was sent "on vacation", and the merchant Fedot Ivanov took his place.

On 24 March 1871, Clemente Șumanski was elected to the position of mayor.
