= Nistor Grozavu =

Moldovan politician (born 1959)

Deputy Mayor of Chișinău
- In office 20 December 2007 – 4 July 2019
- Succeeded by: Victor Chironda

Acting Mayor of Chișinău
- In office 28 July 2017 – 6 November 2017
- Deputy: Silvia Radu; Ruslan Codreanu
- Preceded by: Dorin Chirtoacă
- Succeeded by: Silvia Radu (acting)

Member of the Moldovan Parliament
- In office 22 April 2009 – 12 June 2009
- Parliamentary group: Liberal Party

Personal details
- Born: 22 August 1959 (age 67) Krasnoilsk, Ukrainian SSR, Soviet Union
- Party: Liberal Party (PL)
- Education: Technical University of Moldova
- Profession: Architect

Nistor Grozavu (born 22 August 1959) is a Moldovan politician.

== Biography ==
Nistor Grozavu is a Moldovan architect, politician and former deputy-mayor of Chișinău (the capital of the Republic of Moldova).

Nistor Grozavu's candidature was issued by the general mayor of Chișinău, Dorin Chirtoacă and was supported by the absolute majority of the elected councillors. Nistor Grozavu is an architect by profession. He was the councillor of the general mayor so far and the dean of the Faculty of Architecture and Urbanism of the Technical University of Moldova.

Nistor Grozavu was elected deputy of the Moldovan parliament on the 5 April 2009 parliamentary elections on the Liberal Party (PL) list.
