= Silvia Radu (politician) =

Moldovan politician and manager (born 1972)

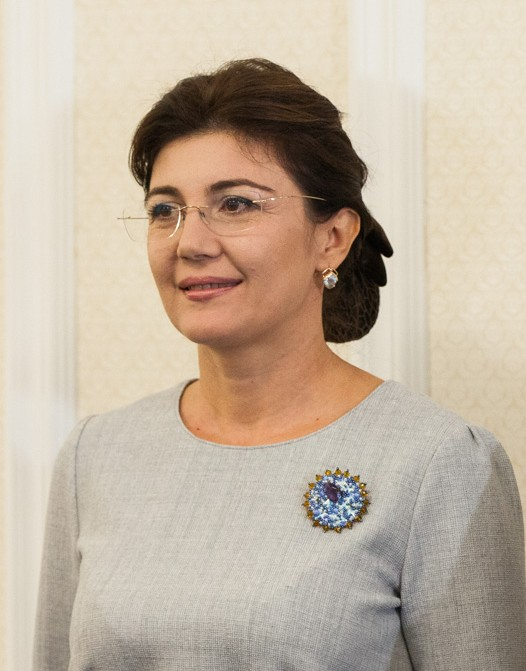
- Radu in 2018

Minister of Health, Labour and Social Protection
- In office 25 September 2018 – 8 June 2019
- President: Igor Dodon
- Prime Minister: Pavel Filip
- Preceded by: Svetlana Cebotari
- Succeeded by: Ala Nemerenco

Acting Mayor of Chișinău
- In office 6 November 2017 – 25 April 2018
- Deputy: Nistor Grozavu; Ruslan Codreanu
- Preceded by: Nistor Grozavu (acting)
- Succeeded by: Ruslan Codreanu (acting)

Personal details
- Born: 27 February 1972 (age 54) Hîncești, Moldavian SSR, Soviet Union
- Education: University of Navarra; Moldova State University
- Profession: Manager

Silvia Radu (born 27 February 1972) is a Moldovan politician and manager. Between 2008 and 2015 she was the director of Gas Natural Fenosa in the Republic of Moldova. In 2016, she was an independent candidate in that year's presidential election. From 6 November 2017 until April, 2018 Radu served as the ad interim of Mayor of Chișinău.
