= Teleșeu =

- Commune and village
- Location in Moldova
- Coordinates: 47°16′N 28°42′E
- Country: Moldova
- District: Orhei District

Population (2014 census)
  - Total: 1,169
- Time zone: UTC+2 (EET)
  - Summer (DST): UTC+3 (EEST)

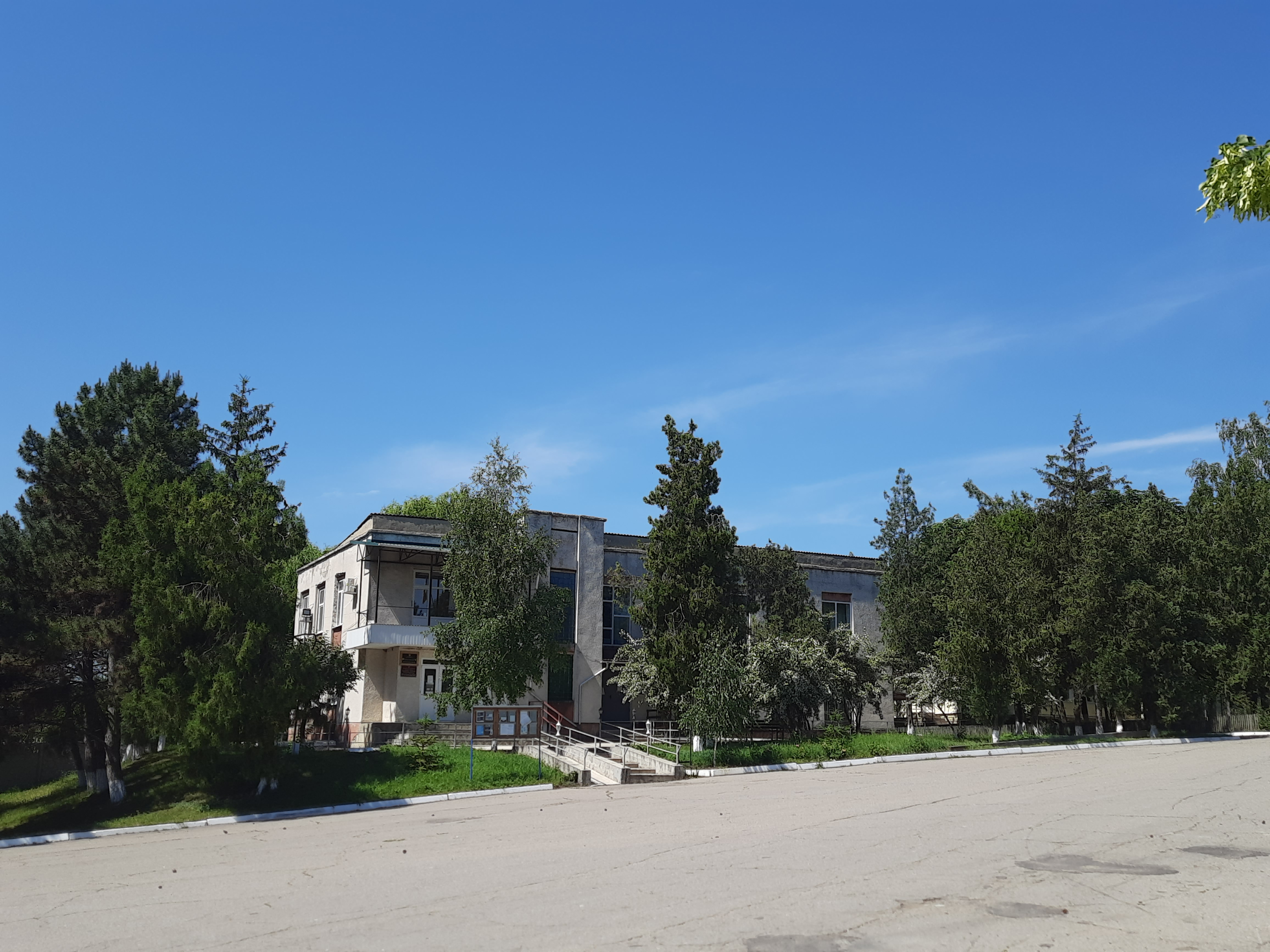
MD.OR.Teleșeu - town hall

Teleșeu is a village in Orhei District, Moldova.

== Demographics ==
According to the 2014 Moldovan census, Teleșeu had a population of 1,169 residents. The village spans an area of 29.6 km², resulting in a population density of approximately 39.5 inhabitants per square kilometer as of 2014. Between the 2004 and 2014 censuses, Teleșeu saw a population decrease of about 1.4%.

Women slightly outnumbered men, with 619 females (52.9%) and 550 males (47.1%). In terms of age distribution, 20.9% of the population were children aged 0–14, 68.7% were of working age (15–64), and 10.4% were aged 65 and older. All residents lived in rural areas.

The vast majority of residents (99.5%) were born in Moldova, with a small number (0.5%) originating from other Commonwealth of Independent States countries. Ethnically, the population was primarily Moldovan (94.4%), followed by Romanians (4.6%) and Ukrainians (0.6%). Moldovan was the most commonly reported native language, spoken by 89.1% of the population, while 10.3% reported Romanian as their native tongue. Virtually all residents identified as Orthodox.

== Administration and local government ==
Teleșeu is governed by a local council composed of nine members. The most recent local elections, in November 2023, resulted in the following composition: 6 councillors from the Party of Action and Solidarity and 3 councillors from the Revival Party. The Alliance of Liberals and Democrats for Europe, the Party of Socialists of the Republic of Moldova, the Liberal Party, and the Chance Political Party also ran, but didn't receive enough votes to select councillors. In the same elections, the candidate from the Party of Action and Solidarity, Ion Dediu, was elected as mayor with a 58.79% majority of the vote.

== Notable people ==
- Vladimir Cristi
