= Adam Krijanovski =

Mayor of Chișinău, Moldova, in 1867–1869

Mayor of Chișinău
- In office 1867–1869
- Preceded by: Dimitrie Mincu
- Succeeded by: Pavel Gumalic

Adam Krijanovski was a mayor of Chișinău from 1867 to 1869.

In 1836, with the rank of provincial registrar, he served as secretary at the court of Zemstvo in Elisavetgrad, in 1837 - in Bobrynets. In 1867, the college assessor Adam Krijanovski became the elected mayor, replacing Dimitrie Mincu at this position. In 1869, Pavel Gumalic was appointed in place of Krijanovski.
