= Dimitrie Bogos =

Romanian politician (1889–1946)

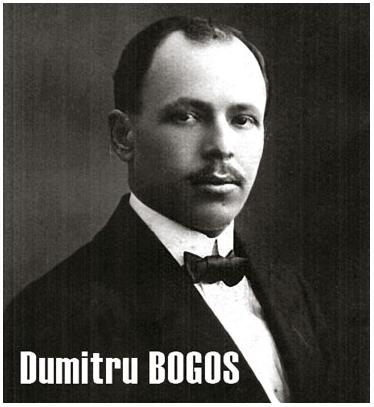
- Bogos in 1930

First Chief of the Staff of the Moldavian Army
- In office 1917–1918

Mayor of Chișinău
- In office 1932–1933
- Preceded by: Gherman Pântea
- Succeeded by: Ion Costin

Personal details
- Born: 14 June 1889 Grozești, Kishinyovsky Uyezd
- Died: 14 May 1946 (aged 56) Bucharest, Romania
- Relations: Dimitrie Bogos (father)
- Education: University of Warsaw

Dimitrie Bogos (14 June 1889 – 14 May 1946) was a Romanian politician, officer, jurist and publicist.

== Biography ==
Dimitrie Bogos was born on 14 June 1889 in the village of Grozești, the Bessarabia Governorate, the Russian Empire. He graduated from Theological Seminary of Chișinău and from the Faculty of Law of the University of Warsaw (1914). He participated in the establishment of the Moldovan Students' Circle "Awakening" in Kiev and Odessa, founded in 1908 by Daniel Ciugureanu, Ştefan Ciobanu, Alexei Mateevici, Simion Murafa, Ştefan Berechet and others, whose president was elected Daniel Ciugureanu. He participated in the First World War at the works of the Congress of Moldovan Militants. Immediately after the Congress, on 20 October 1917, he began to concern himself with the organization of the Moldovan armed forces between Prut and Nistru.

At the opening of the Sfatul Țării on 21 November 1917, he was delegated by the Moldovan Military Commissariat. He was not validated, but as a result of his experience in the Imperial Russian Army, he was appointed the first chief of the General Staff of the Army of the Moldavian Democratic Republic.

After the Union of Bessarabia with Romania he was appointed prefect of Lapusna County (1918-1920), then director of the Ministry of Interior for Bessarabia and minister of Bessarabia, from 5 to 19 January 1922, in Take Ionescu Cabinet, member of the Romanian Parliament, and Mayor of Chișinău (1932—1933). Then he was elected deputy in three legislatures in the Romanian Parliament, from the National Peasants' Party.

He collaborated with articles in various magazines and newspapers, especially with the "Bessarabia's Life".

He wrote a historical work on Bessarabia, titled At Crossing. Moldova from the Dniester in 1917-1918 (Romanian La răspântie. Moldova de la Nistru în anii 1917-1918), published in Chișinău in 1924.

After the Russian invasion of the summer of 1940 he fled to Bucharest, where he died on 14 May 1946. He was buried in the Ghencea Cemetery, then transferred to the family crypt in Cernica Cemetery, where he rests with his brothers.

== Bibliography ==
- Dimitrie Bogos. La răspântie. Moldova de la Nistru 1917–1918. – Ch. : Î.E.P. "Știința", 1998. – 223 p.
- Dimitrie Bogos, United States of Europe, Warsaw
- International Reference Library and Political Parties in Romania, London, 1936.
