= Alexandru Sibirski =

Moldovan politician

Mayor of Chişinău
- In office 1937–1938
- Preceded by: Ion Costin
- Succeeded by: Constantin Dardan

Alexandru Sibirski was a Moldovan politician.

== Biography ==
Alexandru Sibirski served as mayor of Chişinău (1937–1938).
