= Orgeyevsky Uyezd =

Subdivision of the Bessarabia Governorate of the Russian Empire

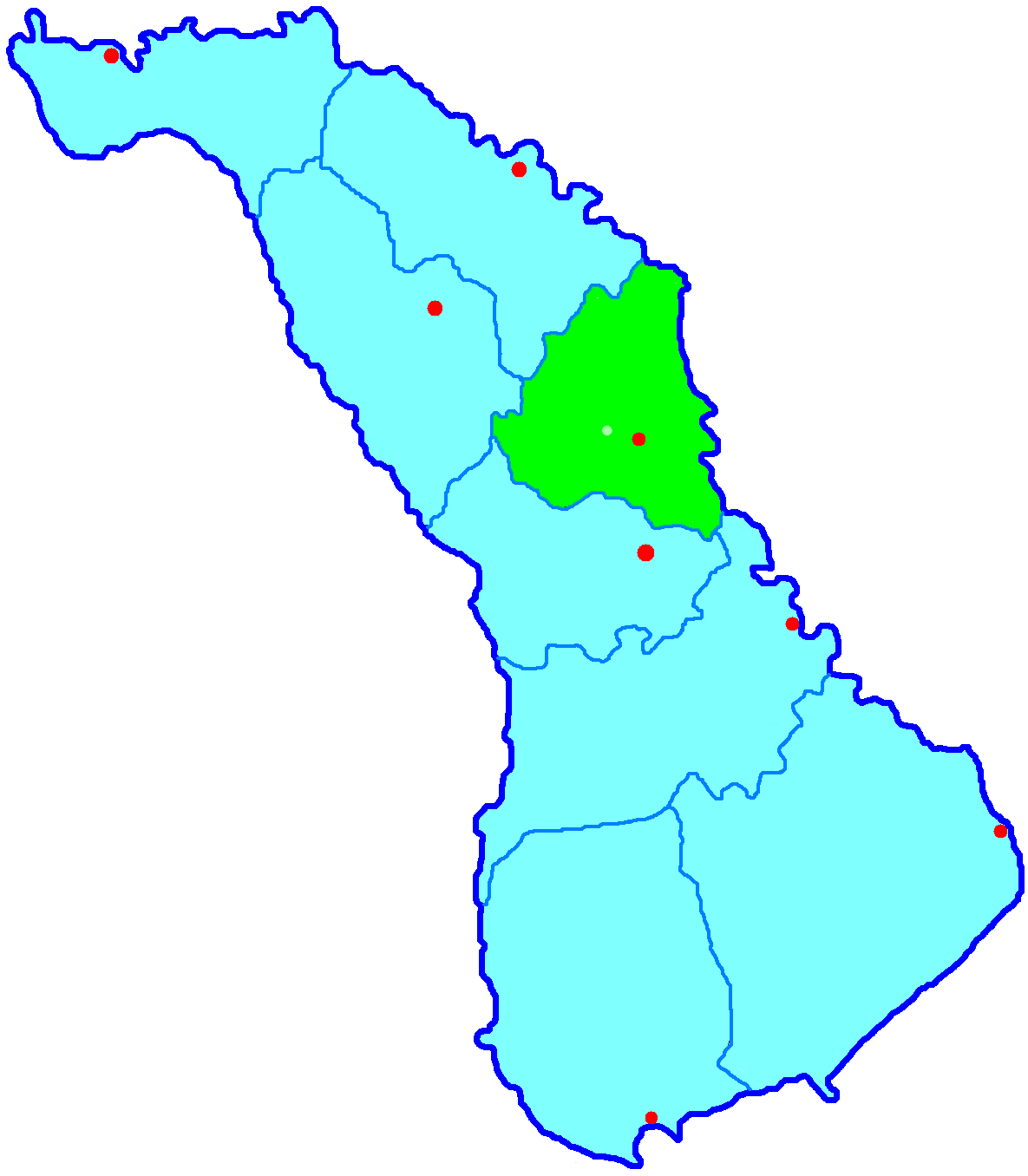
Map

Orgeyevsky County (Russian: Оргеевский уезд, romanized: Orgeyevsky Uyezd) was an uezd, one of the subdivisions of the Bessarabia Governorate of the Russian Empire. It was situated in the central part of the governorate. Its administrative centre was Orhei.

== Demographics ==
At the time of the Russian Empire Census of 1897, Orgeyevsky Uyezd had a population of 213,478. Of these, 77.9% spoke Moldovan and Romanian, 12.5% Yiddish, 5.7% Ukrainian, 2.7% Russian, 0.8% Romani, 0.3% Polish, 0.1% German, 0.1% Armenian and 0.1% Greek as their native language.

== See also ==
- Orhei County (Romania)
- Orhei County (Moldova)
