= Pantelimon I. Sinadino =

Bessarabian politician

Mayor of Chișinău
- In office 1837–1839
- Preceded by: Dimitrie Lovcinski
- In office 1840–1842
- Succeeded by: Dimitrie Lovcinski

Personal details
- Died: Chișinău
- Relations: Pantelimon V. Sinadino (grandson)

Pantelimon I. Sinadino was a Bessarabian politician of Greek descent. He served as mayor of Chișinău in 1837–1839 and 1840–1842, being preceded and succeeded by Dimitrie Lovcinski. Sinadino was the grandfather of Pantelimon V. Sinadino, who also was mayor of Chișinău between 1903 and 1904, 1905–1907 and 1909–1910.

== Bibliography ==
- Enciclopedie. Chișinău.. Chișinău: Editura Museum. 1997.
- Colesnic, Iurie (2004). Generaţia Unirii. Chișinău, București: Museum, Fundația Culturală Română.
