= Ion Costin =

Moldovan politician (1887–1940)

Ion T. Costin
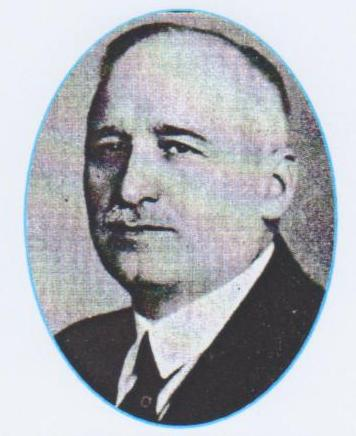
- Costin in 1930

Member of the Moldovan Parliament
- In office 1917–1918

Mayor of Chişinău
- In office 1933–1937
- Preceded by: Dimitrie Bogos
- Succeeded by: Alexandru Sibirski

Personal details
- Born: 19 January 1887 Ghidighici, Lăpuşna County
- Died: 12 January 1940 (aged 52) Bucharest, Kingdom of Romania

Ion T. Costin (19 January 1887 – 12 January 1940) was a Bessarabian Romanian politician. He was born at a time when his native region, as the eastern half of Moldavia, had been taken over by the Russian Empire and organized into a Bessarabia Governorate. Following the October Revolution, he took part in the affairs of the Moldavian Democratic Republic as a member of Sfatul Țării, voting for union with the Kingdom of Romania. Active in its politics, he died several months before the Soviet occupation of Bessarabia.

== Biography ==
He served as Director General for Internal Affairs in Pantelimon Erhan Cabinet and Daniel Ciugureanu Cabinet, then worked as a lawyer in Tulcea. He served also as deputy mayor and then Mayor of Chişinău (1933—1937), director of Sfatul Țării (newspaper) and Dreptatea.

== Gallery ==
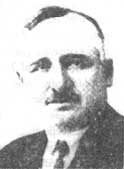
