= Theodor Speranția =

Romanian playwright, humorist, folklorist and journalist (1856 - 1929)

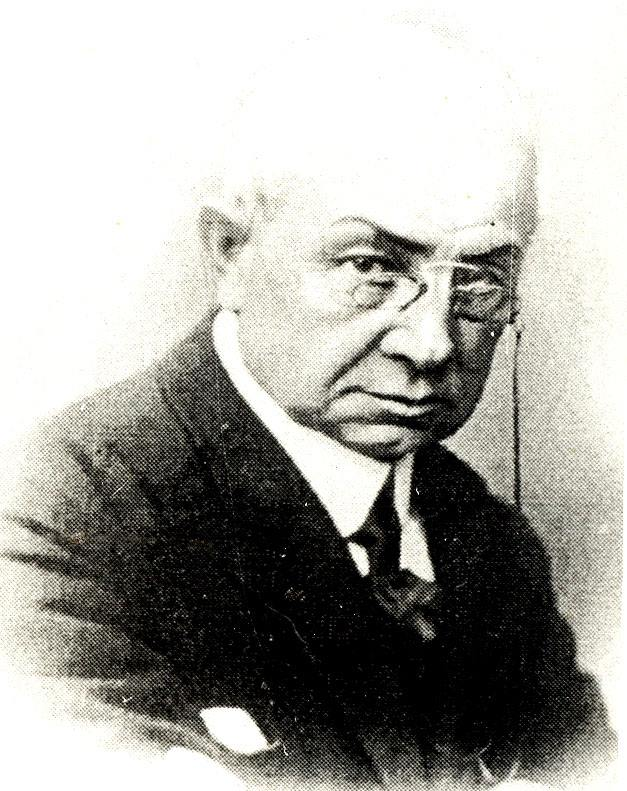
Theodor Speranția

Theodor Dimitrie Speranția (Romanian: [teˈodor speˈrant͡si.a]; born Theodor Dimitrie Nădejde [teˈodor diˈmitri.e nəˈdeʒde]; May 4, 1856 – March 9, 1929) was a Romanian playwright, humorist, folklorist and journalist.

== Biography ==
Born in Deleni, Iași County, his father was D. Nădejde, a Romanian Orthodox deacon; his son was poet Eugeniu Sperantia; and he was the cousin of political brothers Ioan and Gheorghe Nădejde. He attended primary school at Târgu Frumos, where a teacher changed Nădejde to Speranția (both words, the first Slavic and the second Latin in origin, signify 'hope'). He then entered the Veniamin Costachi seminary in Iași, which he left under the influence of socialist ideas. Subsequently, he entered the faculties of science and of literature and philosophy at the University of Iași. Together with the Nădejde brothers and Nicolae Russel, he published the socialist newspaper Besarabia. He entered the Iași socialist circle in 1880 and was one of the founders of its Contemporanul magazine, to which he contributed from 1881 to 1888. At that point, he moved to Bogdan Petriceicu Hasdeu's Revista nouă. Together with Zamfir Arbore and Ștefan Besarabeanu, he published Amicul copiilor in 1891. He enrolled at the University of Liège, where he earned a doctorate in literature and philosophy in 1886. While there, he became acquainted with the European folklore revival and delved into comparative literature. He subsequently moved to the Romanian capital Bucharest. In 1906, in a private capacity, he taught a course on domestic folk literature at the University of Bucharest.

Speranția made his published debut with poems in Perdaful in 1873. Publications for which he wrote include Contemporanul, Adevărul, Convorbiri Literare, Dimineața, Drepturile omului, Familia, Graiul nostru, Literatura și arta română, Munca literară și științifică, Noua revistă română, Rampa, Revista nouă and Universul literar. He edited several of his own magazines, including Caşcavalul, Tămâia and Revista copiilor. He published numerous books of entertaining stories (Anecdote populare, 1889; Anecdote afumate, 1898; Anecdote botezate, 1903; Anecdote piperate, 1903; Anecdote nouă, 1909; Anecdote marinate, 1911; Anecdote cu minuni, 1918; Anecdote cu noroc, 1918; Anecdote proaspete, 1926), plays (Teatru, I, 1894; Mama soacra..., 1894; De necaz, 1900; Ce face beția, 1900; Ce poate lenevia, 1908; Teatru de familie, 1912; Curcanii, 1922; Lângă pământ, 1922), novels (Feighéla, 1902; Fete de azi, I-II, 1908; Mă-nșală, 1921), children's stories (Călătoriile lui Enache Cocoloş, 1903; Chițibuș cel drăguț, 1929) and folklore studies (Introducere în literatura populară română, 1904; Miorița și călușarii, 1914). He was elected a corresponding member of the Romanian Academy in 1891.
