= Grozești, Iași =

Grozești
- Commune
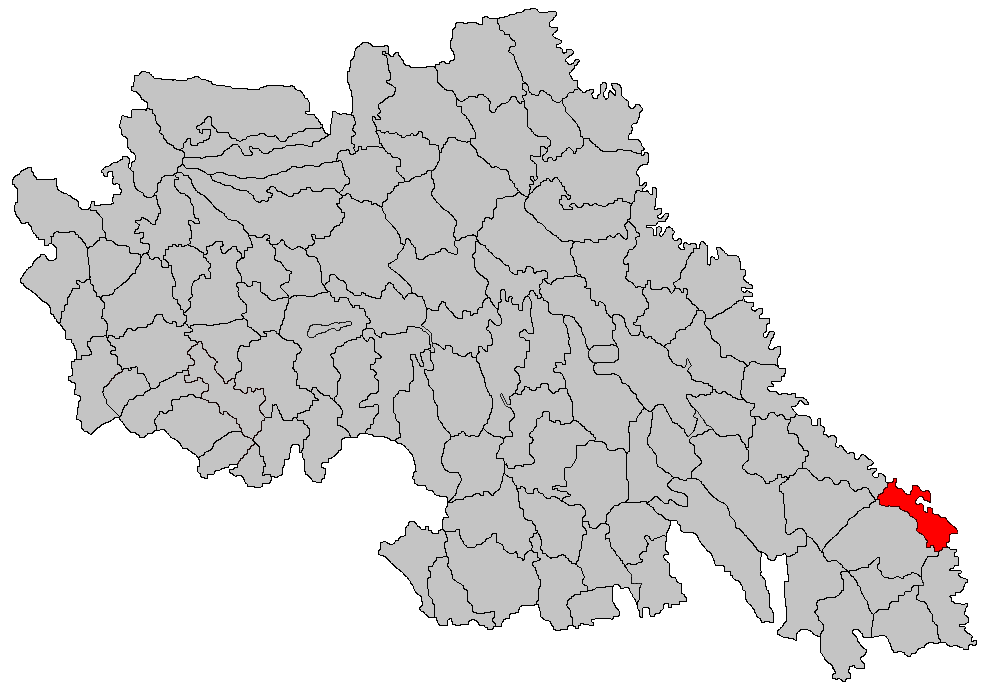
- Location in Iași County

- Location in Romania
- Coordinates: 46°59′25″N 28°03′20″E
- Country: Romania
- County: Iași
- Subdivisions: Grozești, Colțu Cornii, Sălăgeni

Government
  - Mayor (2024–2028): George Cristea (PSD)
- Area: 27.27 km^{2} (10.53 sq mi)
- Elevation: 27 m (89 ft)
- Population (2021-12-01): 1,364
  - Density: 50.02/km^{2} (129.5/sq mi)
- Time zone: UTC+02:00 (EET)
  - Summer (DST): UTC+03:00 (EEST)
- Postal code: 707235
- Area code: +40 x32
- Vehicle reg.: IS
- Website: www.comunagrozesti.ro

Grozești is a commune in Iași County, Western Moldavia, Romania. It is composed of three villages: Colțu Cornii, Grozești and Sălăgeni. Right across the Prut river, which separates Romania from Moldova, is the Moldovan village of the same name.
