= Constantin Dardan =

Moldovan politician

Mayor of Chişinău
- In office 1938–1938
- Preceded by: Alexandru Sibirski
- Succeeded by: Vladimir Cristi

Constantin Dardan was a Moldovan politician.

== Biography ==
Constantin Dardan served as mayor of Chişinău (1938).
