= Nicolae Costin =

Mayor of Chișinău from 1990 to 1994

Nicolae Costin OR
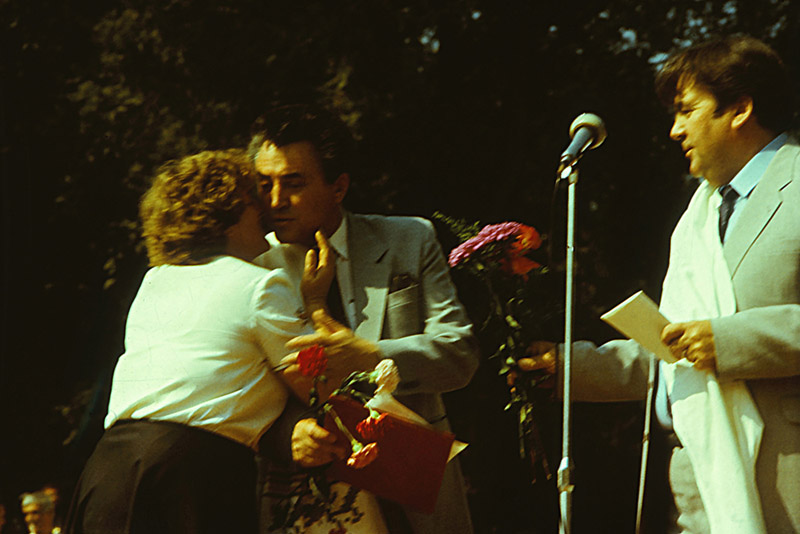
- Costin (left) with Moldovan President Mircea Snegur in 1991

Mayor of Chişinău
- In office 1990 – 9 August 1994
- Preceded by: Mihai Severovan (as Chairman of the Chișinău Executive Committee)
- Succeeded by: Serafim Urechean

Personal details
- Born: 7 April 1936 Pecişte, Kingdom of Romania
- Died: 16 February 1995 (aged 58) Chişinău, Moldova
- Resting place: Chişinău
- Party: Popular Front of Moldova
- Education: Moldova State University
- Profession: Professor

Nicolae Costin (7 April 1936 – 16 February 1995) was a Moldovan politician, and a history professor at Moldova State University who was executive chairman of the Popular Front of Moldova, a deputy in the first elected Parliament of the Republic of Moldova, and co-author of the Moldovan Declaration of Independence.

From 1990 to 1994 he was mayor of Chișinău.

Costin's official cause of death was leukemia. Rumors circulated, with no evidence, that he had been poisoned with radioactive caesium.

== See also ==
- Moldovan Declaration of Independence
