= Deleni, Iași =

Deleni
- Commune
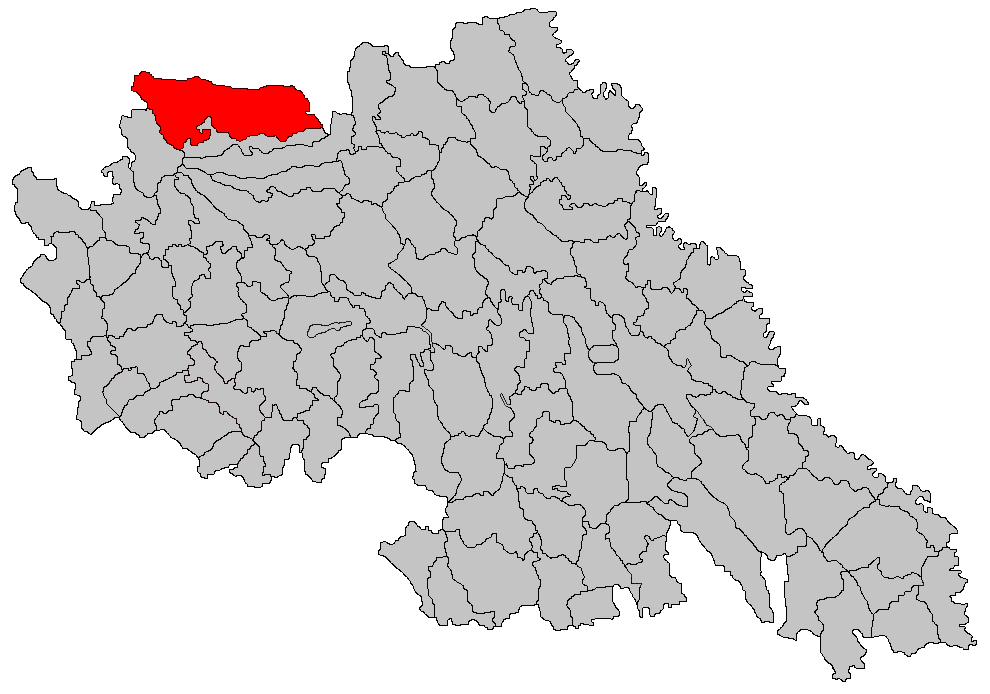
- Location in Iași County

- Location in Romania
- Coordinates: 47°28′N 26°53′E
- Country: Romania
- County: Iași
- Subdivisions: Deleni, Feredeni, Leahu-Nacu, Maxut, Poiana, Slobozia

Government
  - Mayor (2024–2028): Dumitru Prigoreanu (PNL)
- Area: 151.2 km^{2} (58.4 sq mi)
- Elevation: 296 m (971 ft)
- Population (2021-12-01): 8,885
  - Density: 59/km^{2} (150/sq mi)
- Time zone: EET/EEST (UTC+2/+3)
- Postal code: 707165
- Area code: +40 x32
- Vehicle reg.: IS
- Website: comunadeleni.com

Deleni is a commune in Iași County, Western Moldavia, Romania. It is composed of six villages: Deleni, Feredeni, Leahu-Nacu, Maxut, Poiana and Slobozia.

== Natives ==
- Theodor Speranția
