= Alexandru Cotruță =

Bessarabian politician (1828–1905)

Alexandru Mutei Cotruţă
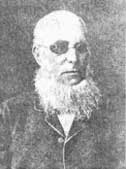

Personal details
- Born: 1828
- Died: 1905 (aged 76–77)
- Relations: Iulian Levinski (son in law)

Alexandru Mutei Cotruţă (1828–1905) was a Bessarabian politician.

== Biography ==
Alexandru Matei Cotruţă studied at the Regional High School in Chișinău and the Richelieu High School in Odessa at the Legal Department. On 1 October 1852 he entered as an official at the Odessa County Court. He also served as secretary of the Basarabian Provincial Nobility (1853-1869) and president of the provincial Uprave of Zemstwa (1875-1889). His son-in-law was Iulian Levinski (1859-1923), mayor of Chisinau.
