= Vladimir Cristi =

Moldovan politician

Member of the Moldovan Parliament
- In office 1917–1918

Director General for Internal Affairs
- In office 1917–1918
- President: Ion Inculeț
- Prime Minister: Pantelimon Erhan; Daniil Ciugureanu

Minister in Romanian Cabinet
- In office 16 January 1932 – 5 June 1932
- Prime Minister: Nicolae Iorga

Mayor of Chișinău
- In office 29 September 1938 – 1940
- Preceded by: Constantin Dardan
- Succeeded by: Anibal Dobjanski

Personal details
- Born: 1880 Teleșeu, Bessarabia Governorate, Russian Empire
- Died: 1956 (aged 75–76) Văcărești Prison, Bucharest, Romanian People's Republic
- Party: Moldavian National Party; National Renaissance Front
- Education: Moscow State University; University of Paris

Vladimir Cristi (1880–1956) was a Romanian publicist and politician who served as State Minister in the Nicolae Iorga government between 16 January and 6 June 1932. Cristi was Mayor of Chișinău between 1938 and 1940.

== Biography ==
Vladimir Cristi was a descendant of a boyar family in Moldavia, the nephew of Ioan Cristi, a Bessarabian noble, and the son of Grigorie Cristi, who had served as the governor of the Oriol gubernia. Vladimir pursued his studies and graduated from the Faculty of Law at the Moscow University and the Faculty of Agronomy at a university in Paris. In 1917, he served as the gubernial commissar of Bessarabia.

He was a deputy in the "Sfatul Țării" (Council of the Country), Minister of Internal Affairs in the government of the Moldovan Democratic Republic, a deputy in the Parliament of Romania, and the Minister for Bessarabia in Nicolae Iorga's government (1931-1932). Vladimir Cristi also held the position of mayor of Chișinău from 1938 to 1940. In 1944, he fled to Nazi-controlled in Austria, where he held the title of Minister of Cults in the puppet government established by the Iron Guard in Vienna. Vladimir Cristi was arrested by the NKVD when attempting to contact Constantin Argetoianu, a former prime minister. He was deported to the Soviet Union and later held at Văcărești Prison, where he died.

== Career ==
Following his graduation from the university, Vladimir began his career within the Zemstva of Orhei County from 1909 until 1917. After the Russian Revolution in 1917, he officially became a member of the party of the Soviet of Peasants and Workers in Chișinău. Vladimir was appointed by the Provisional Government as the gubernial commissioner of Bessarabia, taking over from Constantin Mimi. In his capacity as the gubernial commissioner, V. Cristi engaged in direct negotiations with the Petrograd Government to defend the autonomy of Bessarabia and prevent its annexation to Ukraine. This is evidenced by the reaction of the Ukrainian Prime Minister when he returned from Petrograd to Kiev with only 9 gubernias.

Following the changes brought about by the Bolshevik Revolution and the proclamation of the Moldavian Democratic Republic, Vladimir Cristi's role became that of Director General of Internal Affairs, a position he held during the second government formed after the Declaration of Independence on January 24, 1918, subsequently becoming the Minister of Internal Affairs of the Moldavian Democratic Republic.

Together with other members of the Sfatul Țării, Vladimir presented a memorandum to King Ferdinand I, advocating for the union of the Moldavian Democratic Republic with the Kingdom of Romania, which proved successful. On March 27, 1918, the act of union was signed. V. Cristi continued to lead the internal affairs of the country after the union of Bessarabia with Romania. On April 11, 1918, Cristi was appointed as a delegate to the Ministry of Foreign Affairs of the Romanian government. In June 1932, he joined the Agrarian Union Party. "The Party of Former Landowners of Bessarabia, led by Vladimir Cristi, is part of Constantin Argetoianu's Agrarian Union," as stated in the magazine "Din Trecutul Nostru," published in 1936.

== Properties ==
In a document drafted in March 1932, the politician's properties were listed, including:

- House No. 11 on University Street (Vladimir's residence)
- In the village of Teleșeu, Orhei County, he owned 14 hectares of arable land, 17 hectares of vineyards, and 1 hectare of garden.
- In the village of Zamcioji, Rădeni commune, Lăpușna County, he had an estate with a total area of 214 hectares and 1154 square meters. This included: the mansion along with the park (6 hectares and 6,684 square meters), orchards of apple, plum, and walnut trees (46 hectares and 7,730 square meters), under the room (6 hectares and 2,095 square meters), arable land and hayfield (143 hectares and 810 square meters), and acacia plantations (5 hectares). His mansion reflected the wealth of the politician, with 25 rooms and 3 kitchens. The estate administrator lived in another two-level building. There were stables for horses and cows, an icehouse, and a cellar.

== The last years of his life ==
After the Soviet occupation of Bessarabia and Northern Bukovina in 1940, Vladimir took refuge in Romania and later fled to Austria, where he was seized by Soviet secret services. Cristi, along with his entire family, was arrested as an "enemy of the people" and sent to the central detention facility in the USSR for investigations. He died in 1956 in Văcărești Prison in Bucharest.

== Bibliography ==
- Figuri contemporane din Basarabia. Enciclopedie, Chișinău, 1939
- Alexandru Chiriac. Mic dicționar al membrilor Sfatului Țării, Patrimoniu, 1992; Dicționarul Membrilor Sfatului Țării 1917–1918. Editura Fundației culturale Române. București.2001
- http://www.bessarabia.ru/Vladimir%20Cristi.htm
- https://moldova.europalibera.org/a/29282813.html
- https://www.aosr.ro/wp-content/uploads/2018/03/Fauritorii-MU-Vladimir-Cristi.pdf
