= Pantelimon V. Sinadino =

Bessarabian politician (1875–1940)

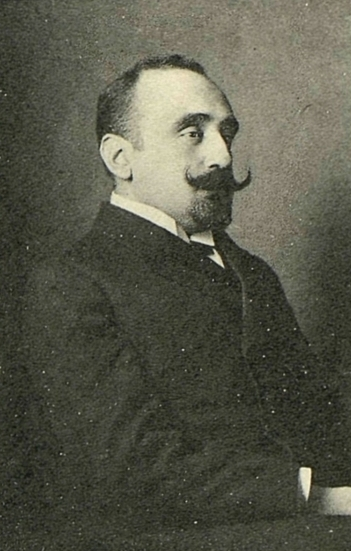
- Sinadino in 1910

Member of the Chamber of Deputies
- In office 1933–1934

Member of the Sfatul Țării
- In office 1917–1918

Mayor of Chișinău
- In office 1903–1904
- In office 1905–1907
- In office 1909–1910

Member of the Imperial Duma
- In office 1907–1917

Personal details
- Born: 17 July 1875 Chișinău
- Died: 1940 Gulag
- Party: National Liberal Party (Romania)
- Relations: Pantelimon I. Sinadino (grandfather)
- Education: Kyiv University
- Profession: physician

Pantelimon V. Sinadino (17 July 1875 – 3 February 1940) was a Bessarabian politician. He served as mayor of Chișinău (1903–1904, 1905–1907, 1909–1910). He was the grandson of Pantelimon I. Sinadino.

== Gallery ==
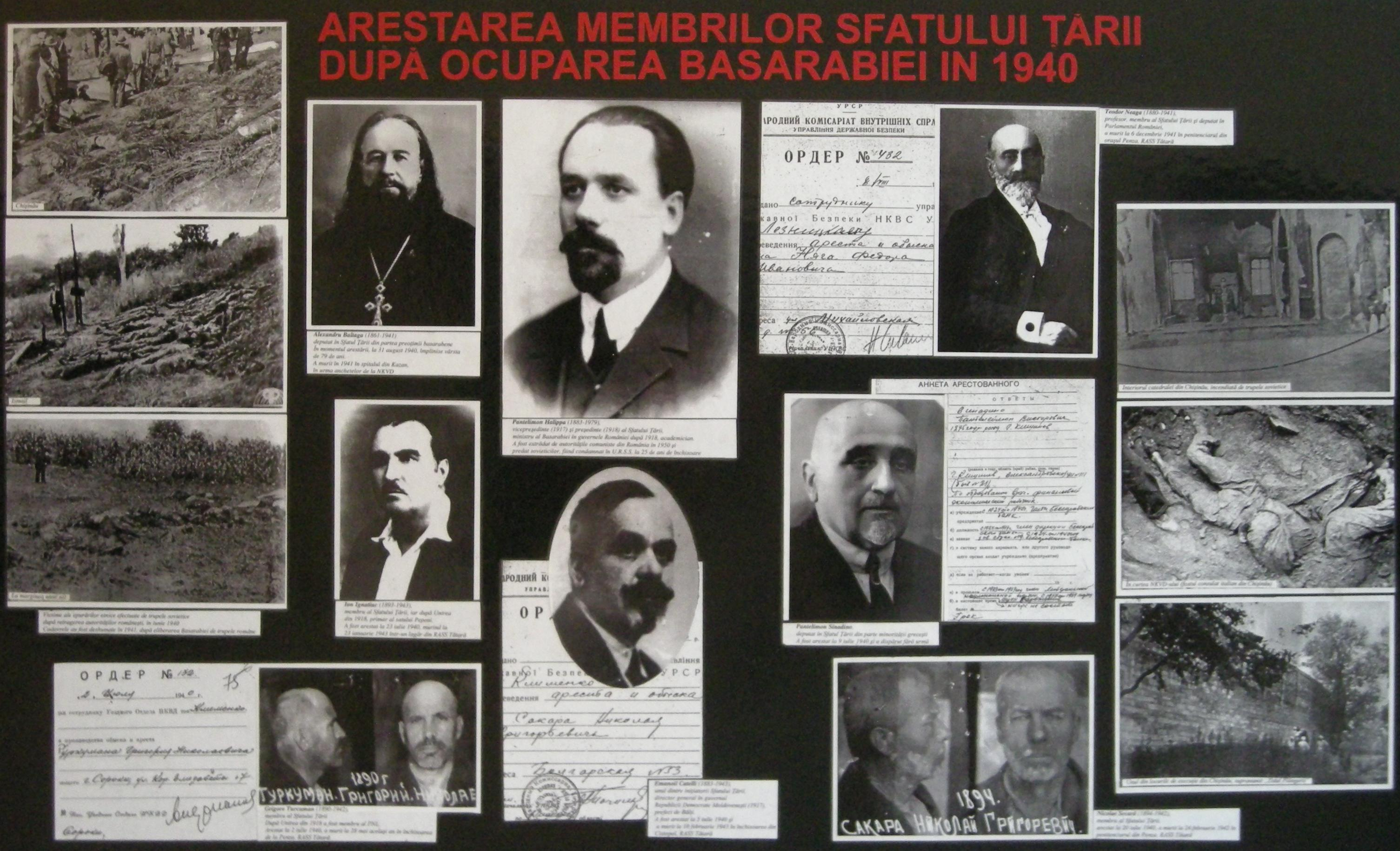
1940s persecutions

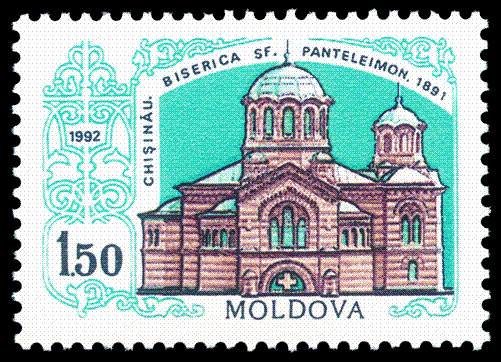
Panteleimon Church, built by his father Victor Sinadino

== Works ==
- Chișinăul nostru (1904–06, Amintiri) (manuscris);
- Creditul în Basarabia – Chișinău, 1929;
- Ce este necesar pentru însănătoșirea vieții economice în Basarabia – Chișinău, Tip. Dreptatea, 1916

== Bibliography ==
- Enciclopedie. Chișinău. Chișinău: Editura Museum. 1997.
- Colesnic, Iurie (2004). Generația Unirii. Chișinău, București: Museum, Fundaţia Culturală Română.
