= Constantin Bivol =

Bessarabian Romanian politician (1885–1942)

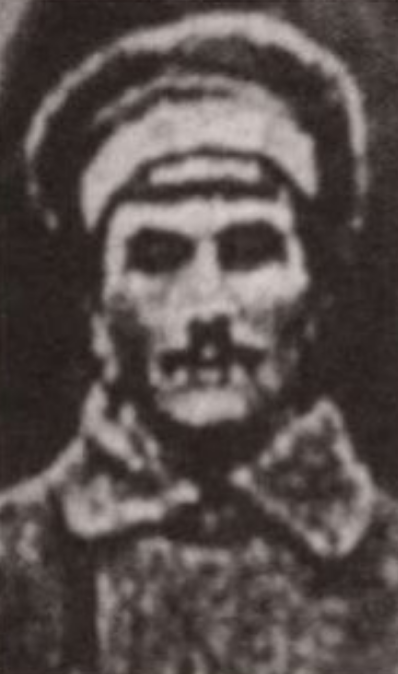
- Bivol, in Russian Army uniform, photographed in 1918

Member of Sfatul Țării
- In office November 1917 – November 1918
- Constituency: Soldiers' Soviet

Member of the Romanian Assembly of Deputies
- In office November 6, 1919 – May 1920
- Constituency: Chișinău County

Personal details
- Born: Constantin Vasilievici Bivol; March 10, 1885 Costești, Kishinev Uyezd, Bessarabia Governorate, Russian Empire
- Died: March 12, 1942 (aged 57) No 4 Prison, Chistopol, Tatar ASSR
- Party: Moldavian Bloc (1917); PȚB (1919)
- Other political affiliations: National Peasants' Party (1925–1927); National Liberal Party (1927–1940?)
- Profession: Agriculturalist

Constantin Vasilievici Bivol (Russian: Константинъ Васильевич Биволъ, romanized: Konstantin Vasilyevich Bivol; Moldovan Cyrillic: Константин Бивол; March 10, 1885 – March 12, 1942) was a Bessarabian politician and agriculturalist, brother of the more famous politician Nicolae Bivol. Hailing from the ethnic Romanian community of Costești, he was born a subject of the Russian Empire, and saw action with the Imperial Russian Army in World War I. He was a soldiers' delegate to Sfatul Țării, the regional assembly of the Bessarabia Governorate, after elections in November 1917; upon the proclamation of a Moldavian Democratic Republic, he veered toward Romanian nationalism, and promoted the Romanian vernacular (known locally as "Moldavian") against the linguistic pluralism championed by Bessarabia's ethnic minorities.

In early 1918, Bivol supported the republic's merger into the Kingdom of Romania and was active within the post-union Bessarabian Peasants' Party. His main activity in the late stages of Sfatul was with the commission of land reform: Bivol supported a radical version of the project, but moderated his stance during subsequent debates. He had a stint in the Romanian Assembly of Deputies following elections in November 1919. He joined the consolidated National Peasants' Party and then its rivals, the National Liberals, serving two additional stints as mayor of his native village (1925–1926, 1932). He was trapped in Bessarabia by a Soviet invasion in 1940, and was arrested by the NKVD—whose leadership investigated him as an anti-Soviet element. He was transported to the Gulag, and died of malnutrition in Soviet Tataria. Bivol's family was not informed of his death until a posthumous rehabilitation process, in 1990.

== Biography ==
=== Early life and Sfatul ===
Bivol was born as a Russian citizen in Costești, Kishinev Uyezd, with Nicolae as his brother. In a 1918 record, their ethnicity was indicated as "Moldavian"—a term used in that paper for all the Romanian or Romanian-speaking delegates to Sfatul Țării. Archivist Alexandru Moraru calls Bivol a "Romanian Bessarabian" and "martyr of the Romanian people". In July 1918, Bivol remarked that he belonged to the Bessarabian yeomanry (răzeși), whom he called "Bessarabia's oldest inhabitants", but that much of his property had been scattered into small and irretrievable pieces of land. He paid tax on 10 dessiatins (some 27 acres, or 11 hectares), adding: "I only use 5 dessiatins, God only knows where the rest of them are." Nicolae Bivol was drawn into the "national-democratic" movement during the Russian Revolution of 1905, networking with Ion Pelivan, Emanuil Gavriliță, and Alexandru Ouatul. Constantin himself was a farmer down to World War I, when he was called for service in the Imperial Army, witnessing the February Revolution. Integrated with the post-revolutionary Russian Army, he was sent to Sfatul by the Central Moldavian Executive Committee of the Soldiers' Soviet. His brother was also a member, but the circumstances of his election, and the institution which he represented, are still unclear.

As seen by historian Ion Țurcanu, Bivol was one of the "revolutionary romanticists" within Sfatul and its "Moldavian Bloc". This subgroup believed that social justice as expressed by the February Revolution was compatible with the agenda of Romanian nationalism, and could therefore be preserved after union with the Romanian state. On February 5, 1918, the assembly took to debating the national language of the Republic—with ethnic-minority delegates, headed by Krste Misirkov, insisting on "Moldavian and Russian [as] the two equal languages." Bivol took the rostrum to oppose this move, and, using his native language, insisted that minorities, while allowed to speak with each other in their own languages, should "learn Moldavian, out of respect for the Moldavian nation." His own speech was not understood by Misirkov and the other minority deputies, who asked for a Russian summary of what was being said. As temporary chairman, Pan Halippa translated the relevant parts, but echoed Bivol's opinion, noting that "the deputies should have already learned Moldavian by now." In March, Bivol also supported assigning Pushkin Hall to Făclia Society, which had promised to create therein a Romanian-language theater.

On March 27, Bivol was among the majority of deputies who voted for union with Romania, afterwards involving himself in debates about the scope and shape of the promised land reform. He endorsed a radical, egalitarian, and universal redistribution of the gentry's estates, arguing for the political goal of creating a "strong peasant class". In Bivol's view, family plots could be no less than 7 dessiatins (some 19 acres, or 7 hectares). In May, Sfatul voted him as a Moldavian Bloc delegate on its newly established commission for land reform, where, in June, he spoke out against the preservation of model farms as inalienable land—and against the position taken by deputies such as Vladimir Tsyganko. Bivol and Mihail Minciună played down the notion that gentry-owned farms were significantly more productive than peasant farms—their claims on this issue are seen by Țurcanu as manipulative, or at least mistaken. Bivol was also hostile to the Orthodox clergy, arguing that priests should be dispossessed of their plots, and suggesting that monasteries only be granted land sparingly, in proportion to their staff.

The debates dragged on for 17 sessions, to June 26, when Bivol pessimistically noted: "I see things going down the path where peasants will not be receiving even a single patch of land" (Eu văd că lucrul nostru merge astfel că țăranii nu vor primi niciun petic de pământ). By August, he was criticizing proposals for the reintroduction of an open-field system, noting that no Bessarabian peasant would have endorsed the obshchina against a tradition of yeomanry. In one of his statements, he contrasted the Sfatul project, crafted "by the state for generic purposes of state", with war communism as applied in Soviet Russia. He argued that the only thing landowners could fear was losing such property as they no longer used for cultivation. He continued to favor complete redistribution, as defined by the slogan "all land to the laboring people", but, as Țurcanu points out, he "swiftly" moderated his stance. The agenda was postponed again by uncertainty regarding the legality of Sfatul decisions, as well as by the 1918 harvest; the Romanian Army was called in to ensure that peasants would continue to work as "obligatory tenants" of the landowners during that summer and autumn.

=== Romanian career and Soviet imprisonment ===
The closing months of 1918 signaled the establishment of Greater Romania, which united the Kingdom and its Bessarabian provinces with Transylvania, the Banat, and Bukovina. Bivol was supportive of this project, joining Halippa's Committee for the Unification of All Romanians and its 10-member leadership board. On November 18, the Coandă cabinet pushed for a resolution of land reform in Bessarabia, which imposed on the Sfatul commission to pass through a Romanian-sanctioned project. As noted by Țurcanu, the decision was of questionable legality, since many of the members were absent, while others had been included without the formalities of a Sfatul approval; Bivol, who voted in favor, was one of the twelve members who met both conditions. During the final deliberations, he proposed that the expenses of land-reform procedures be transferred to the peasants themselves; he also ensured that expropriation did not interfere with any ongoing sustainable agriculture and reforestation projects, and noted that those peasants who received orchards and vineyards should not expect to receive arable land. Bivol also proposed, and obtained, that banks be barred from ever foreclosing on the land assigned to peasants, which thus became inalienable. He was then assigned to the local commission which oversaw the land reform in Soroca Uyezd.

On August 23, 1918, Bivol's brother had signed up as a founding member of the Bessarabian Peasants' Party (PȚB). Constantin also joined the group, and ran on its list during the legislative election of November 1919. On November 6, he was confirmed for a seat in the Assembly of Deputies in Chișinău County, as the last of seven PȚB deputies elected in that precinct (Daniel Ciugureanu came in first). During Assembly sessions, Bivol and other PȚB men decried the new administration's clampdown on rebellious Bessarabian peasants, and especially government's tendency to describe locals as "Bolsheviks". On December 26, Bivol also demanded that Romania provide "brotherly support" to the Romanian and "Moldavian" communities in the Ukrainian Soviet Socialist Republic, estimating that there were 500 thousand such co-nationals. During January 1920, he raised awareness about shortages of salt and kerosene.

Bivol only served to the recall elections of May 1920, but continued to engage in local politics. He was elected Mayor of his native Costești in 1925, though he only served as such to April 1926. He was ultimately deposed by Prefect Gabriel Niculescu-Mureșanu, who had been petitioned by the local villagers. Bivol was by then affiliated with the National Peasants' Party in 1925, but defected to the National Liberals in 1927. The latter affiliation resulted in his return as Mayor of Costești for eight months in 1932; he was reportedly a member of that party until 1940. He witnessed the Soviet invasion of Bessarabia in June 1940, which transformed Bessarabia into a Moldavian Soviet Socialist Republic. On August 25, the NKVD arrested Bivol at his last known domicile, the village of Dahnovici. He was one of 14 members of the Sfatul to be captured in that round-up; Major Nikolai Sazykin, who was commanding over the local NKVD, reported to his chief Lavrentiy Beria that they were all in his custody, and proposed a show trial. Sazykin contended that the Moldavian Bloc and the Sfatul were active "counterrevolutionary" organizations, guilty of "criminal activity against the Moldavian people", and described Bivol as a "landowner". Beria postponed his decision to February 1941, by which time 13 of the 14 men had died in various areas of the Gulag. The one exception was Ion Codreanu, who, in May 1941, was exchanged with Romania for the Romanian Communist Party militant Ana Pauker.

Moraru argues that Bivol was continuously tortured, in what was an effort to make him confess to political crimes, and ultimately killed off when he would not oblige the NKVD. His death was recorded as having taken place on March 12, 1942, at No 4 Prison's hospital of Chistopol, in the Tatar Autonomous Soviet Socialist Republic. The ultimate cause recorded as a combination of malnutrition and colitis. Bivol's case was declared closed, due to lack of evidence as well as to his demise, though his family was left uninformed about his ultimate fate.

== Legacy ==
Bivol only underwent rehabilitation in the Soviet Union on July 16, 1990. His daughter, Vera Căpățină, petitioned the Moldavian prosecutor and the local KGB for additional information. She was told that the property confiscated from Bivol could not be returned, and that: "Regretfully, we were unable to locate his place of burial." In post-Bessarabian and post-Soviet Moldova, he is counted among the "victims of communist totalitarianism", and included as such in a 2001 book by the National Museum of History; as noted by Moraru, the work also lists twenty-one other Bivols from Costești, which may indicate that the whole family was fundamentally anti-communist. Bivol is also commemorated in Romania, where, in 2018, his life was showcased by the Sighet Memorial's "Men of the Union" exhibit.
