= Teodosie Bârcă =

Moldovan politician

Member of Sfatul Țării
- In office 1917–1918

Personal details
- Born: 1894 Tătărăuca Nouă, Soroksky Uyezd, Bessarabia Governorate

Teodosie Bârcă (1894 – ?) was a Bessarabian politician, member of Sfatul Țării, the parliament that voted the Union of Bessarabia with Romania.

== Biography ==
He was born in Tătărăuca Nouă, Soroksky Uyezd, Bessarabia Governorate. Bârcă served as Member of Sfatul Țării in 1917–1918.

== Gallery ==
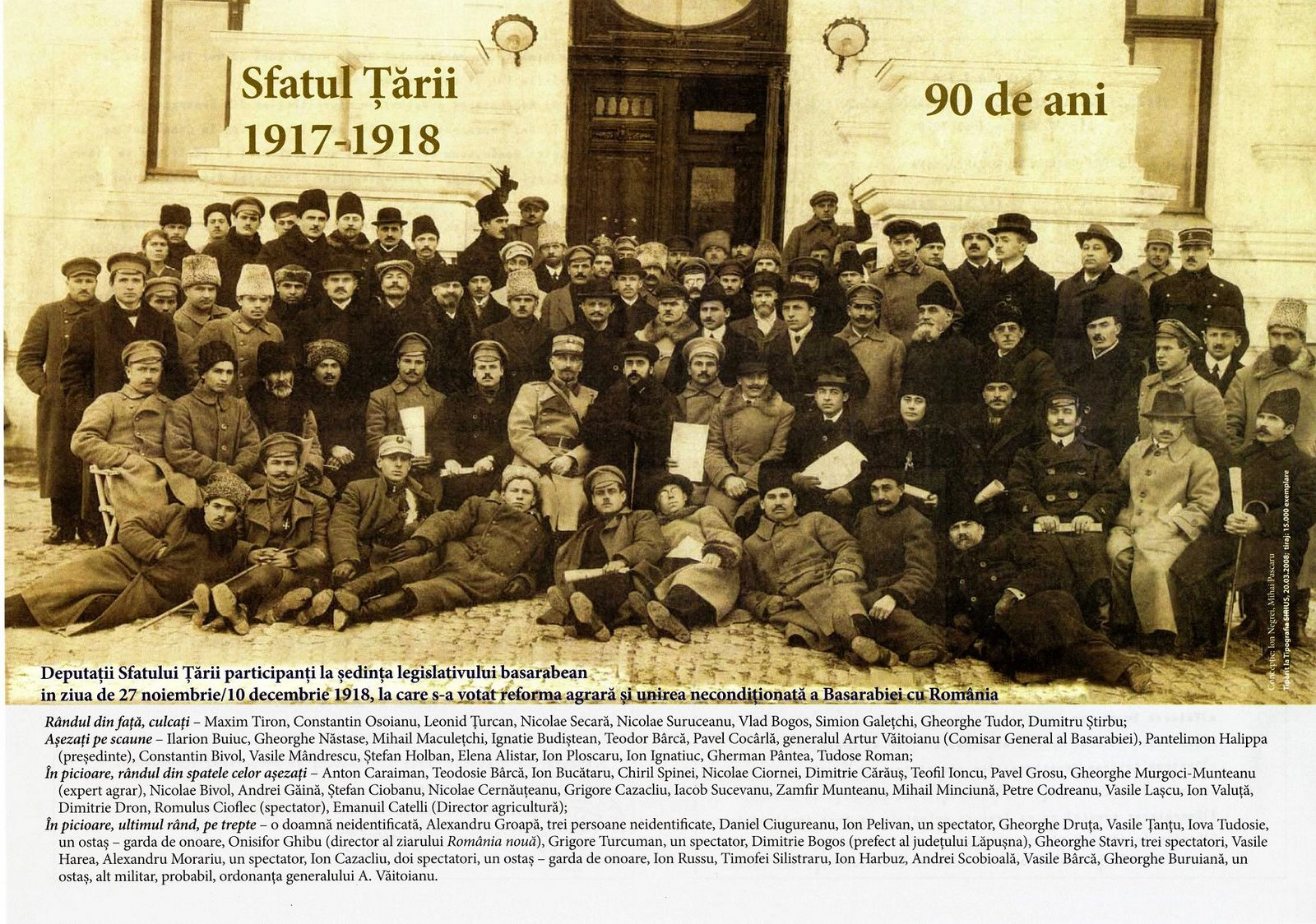
Sfatul Țării, December 10, 1918; Teodosie Bârcă is second from the left, standing behind the seated row

Moldovan stamp, 1998

== Bibliography ==
- Gheorghe E. Cojocaru, Sfatul Țării: itinerar, Civitas, Chișinău, 1998, ISBN 9975-936-20-2
- Mihai Tașcă, Sfatul Țării și actualele autorități locale, Timpul de dimineață, no. 114 (849), June 27, 2008 (page 16)
