= Grigore Turcuman =

Bessarabian Romanian politician

Member of Sfatul Țării
- In office 1917–1918

Personal details
- Born: 20 October 1890 Tătărăuca Nouă, Soroksky Uyezd, Bessarabian Governorate, Russian Empire
- Died: 28 May 1942 (aged 51) Penza, Russian SFSR, Soviet Union (Gulag)
- Resting place: unknown
- Party: National Liberal Party (Romania)
- Spouse(s): Vera, née Bârlădeanu
- Children: Constantin, Tatiana
- Occupation: Landowner, politician
- Profession: Navy officer

Grigore Turcuman (20 October 1890 – 28 May 1942) was a Bessarabian Romanian politician. As a member of Sfatul Țării (the Bessarabian Parliament), he voted the Union of Bessarabia with the Kingdom of Romania on 27 March 1918.

== Biography ==
Turcuman was born in a Romanian (Moldavian) family from Tătărăuca Nouă, Soroksky Uyezd, Bessarabia Governorate. He served as Navy officer in the Imperial Russian Navy (Black Sea naval force), during World War I. After the beginning of the Russian Revolution, he came back to Bessarabia, being elected on 21 November 1917 Member of Sfatul Țării (the Moldovan Parliament), as representative of the Bessarabian Romanian soldiers and officers, serving until 1918. Representing the opinion of the majority, he voted the Union of Bessarabia with the Kingdom of Romania on 27 March 1918.

Later he advanced in rank to Navy Captain (in reserve), in the Black Sea Division of the Romanian Royal Navy. As member of the Romanian National Liberal Party, Turcuman served in the administration of Soroca County, being sub-Prefect between 1933 and 1937. After the Soviet occupation of Bessarabia and Northern Bukovina in June 1940, he was arrested by the Soviet NKVD on July 2, 1940. Prosecuted for his political activity as Romanian Unionist, he was sent to the Gulag, where he perished in May 1942 at the hospital of Prison No. 1 in Penza.

== Gallery ==
Moldovan stamp, 1998

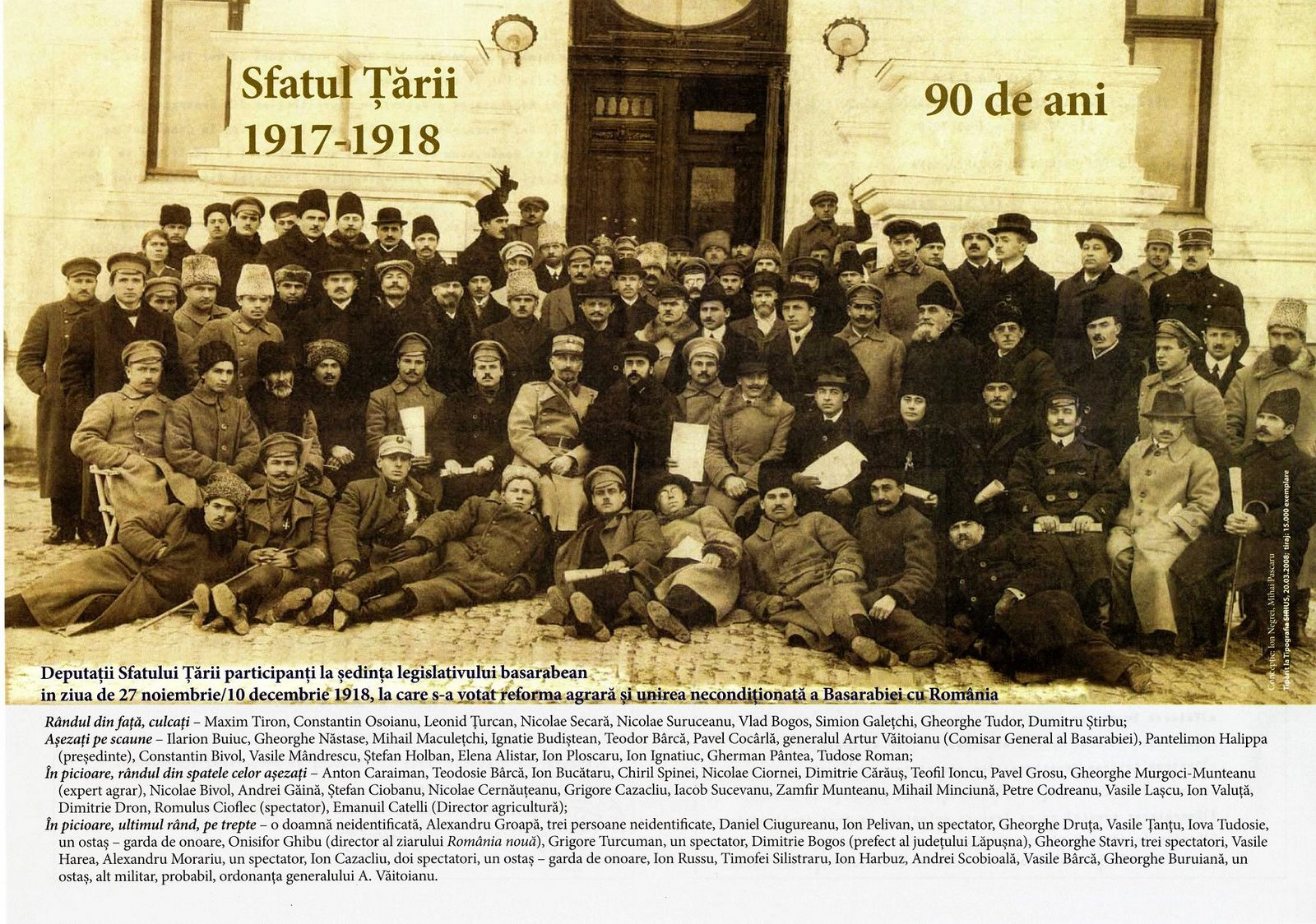
Sfatul Țării, December 10, 1918; Turcuman is in the middle, standing in the last row, on stairs

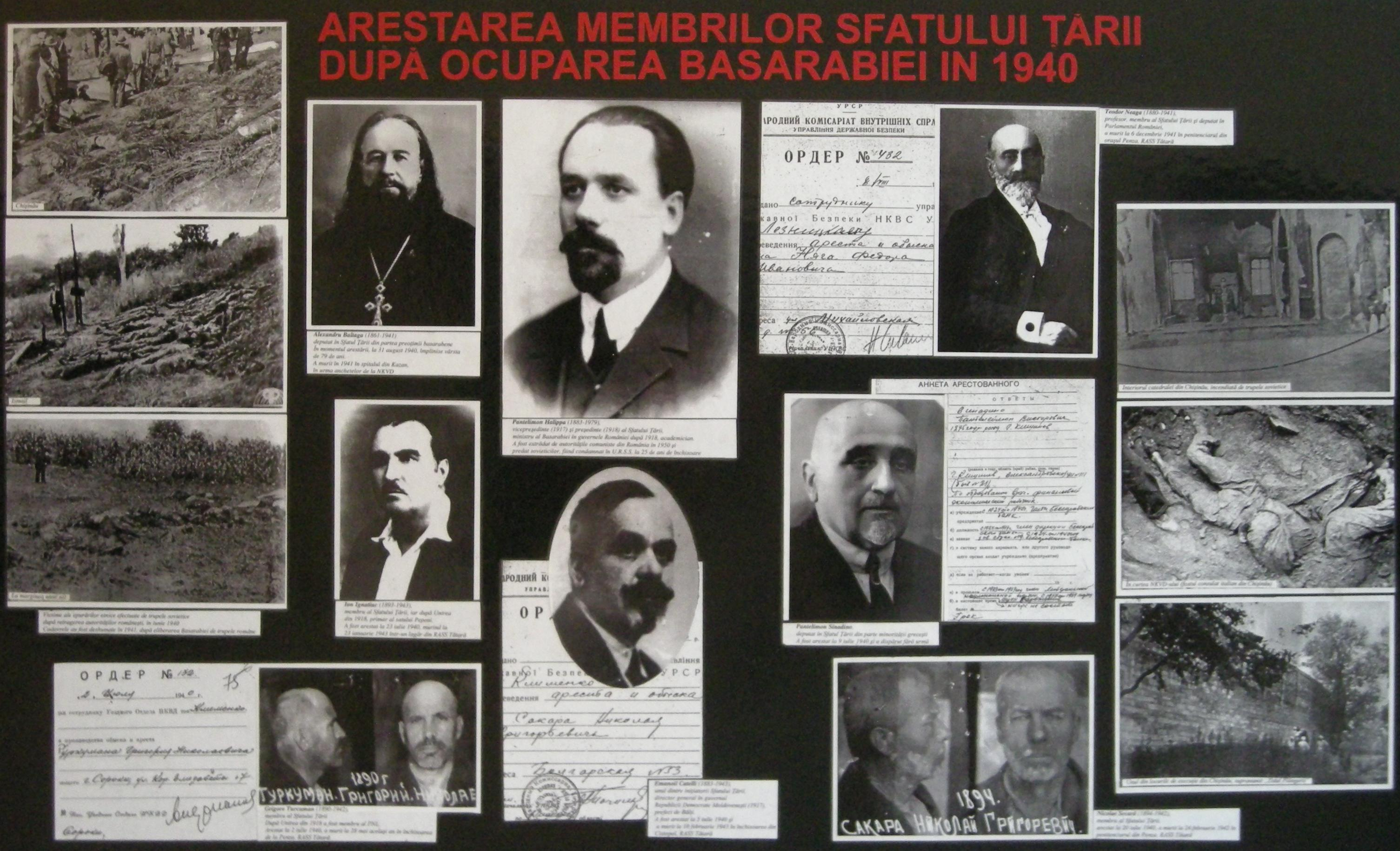
1940s persecutions against Sfatul Țării members

== Bibliography ==
- "Eliberați" pentru a fi nimiciți (grupaj): Grigorii Turcuman, in "Moldova suverană", nr. 96, 24 iunie 1993, p. 3.
