= Saint George-Lozonschi Church =

Heritage site in Iași County, Romania

Coordinates: 47.1630°N 27.5796°E

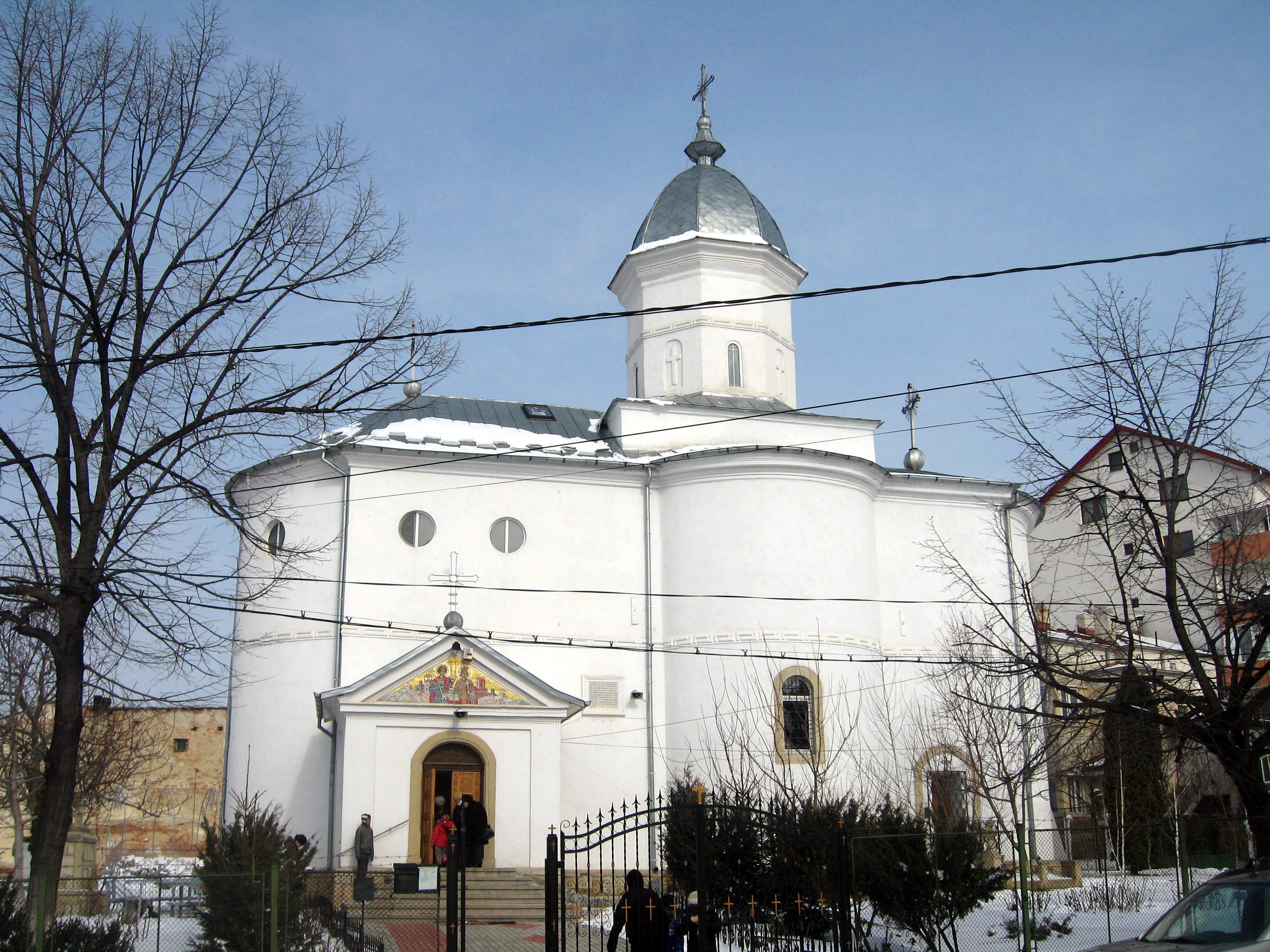
Saint George-Lozonschi Church

Saint George-Lozonschi Church (Romanian: Biserica Sfântul Gheorghe - Lozonschi) is a Romanian Orthodox church located at 2 Cloșca Street in Iași, Romania. It is dedicated to Saint George and Saint Catherine of Alexandria.

== Origins and description ==
The first church on the site was built in the 16th century; it was made of wood and also named after Saint George. The oldest mention dates to 1615. The date of construction is unknown, but the ktitor was pârcălab Gheorghe Kataratos, a Greek who lived in Lozna village, hence the nickname Izlozeanul or Lozonschi. The church was also known as the Lady's Church (Biserica Doamnei), the Young Lady's Church (Biserica Domniței) or the Young Lady Mărioara's Church (Biserica Domniței Mărioara). Hence, historian N. A. Bogdan suggested it may have been founded by Maria of Lozonț, one of the ladies of Stephen the Great, or by a descendant or relative of hers. Another historian claims that the Lady's Church was actually located in the princely court, and that a documentary confusion gave rise to an erroneous identification. In 1707, the priests granted a plot of land for a house, itself a gift, to a certain Vasile in exchange for material to build a new roof.

At the end of the 18th century, due to the church's advanced state of degradation, paharnic Iordache Lozonschi, a descendant of the original founder, rebuilt the church in stone. As the Romanian Cyrillic dedication plaque on the south side indicates, the present church was built in 1800. At the same time, the church was also dedicated to Saint Catherine, after the name of Lozonschi's wife. The founder died in 1818, as attested by the white marble gravestone in the nave. A parish church from the beginning, it was attended by members of the bootmakers' guild. During the 19th century, Saint Demetrius-Balș Church was its filial. It did not receive substantial donations and was mainly supported through its own income. Among its properties was the Hăsnășeni estate in the Bessarabia Governorate, the income being transmitted through the Russian consulate. There was a cemetery around the church; the palace of Mihail Sturdza was located to the south, while boyar houses stretched north of the cemetery.

Trefoil in form, the church has semicircular apses on the exterior and interior, with a single octagonal spire above the nave. Notably, the western wall and the altar are rounded, probably an Armenian influence that came through Russia. There is a row of circular windows on the upper part of the church. The vestibule has a space for the choir, divided from the nave by a wall nearly a meter thick. The bell tower sits above the choir. There are two hidden spaces above the side apses. The iconostasis, from 1800, is made of massive wood planks that cannot be removed, other than the four large royal icons.

== Subsequent developments ==
An alehouse once stood near the church. According to one story, Metropolitan Veniamin Costache (reigned 1803–1842, with interruptions) was riding in a carriage in the area when he spotted a drunken priest, whom he chastised. The priest promised not to drink except for St. George and St. Demetrius. Seen drunk a few days later by Costache, the latter upbraided him for breaking his vow. The priest replied his promise meant he would only drink in the bars around St. George and St. Demetrius churches, not that he would abstain from drinking on all but those two feast days.

Using the parish's own income, the church was thoroughly repaired between 1895 and 1898, an event marked by an inscription on a black plaque placed on the interior south wall of the nave. A square foyer that serves as an entrance was added at the time; it is small and classical in design. A Polish painter covered parts of the apse and altar, as well as four triangles on the ceiling, with images of saints and the Four Evangelists. The fresco work was done in neoclassical style but only fragments have survived, in the altar. Among the church's valuables are a wooden communion box from 1806, a silver cross and stand from 1812, a silver candlestick from 1816 and a silver disc from 1825. It also owns a Greek Gospel book from 1793, a Slavonic one from 1803 and ten books from Costache's time, including the Neamț Gospel book of 1821.

The church is listed as a historic monument by Romania's Ministry of Culture and Religious Affairs.

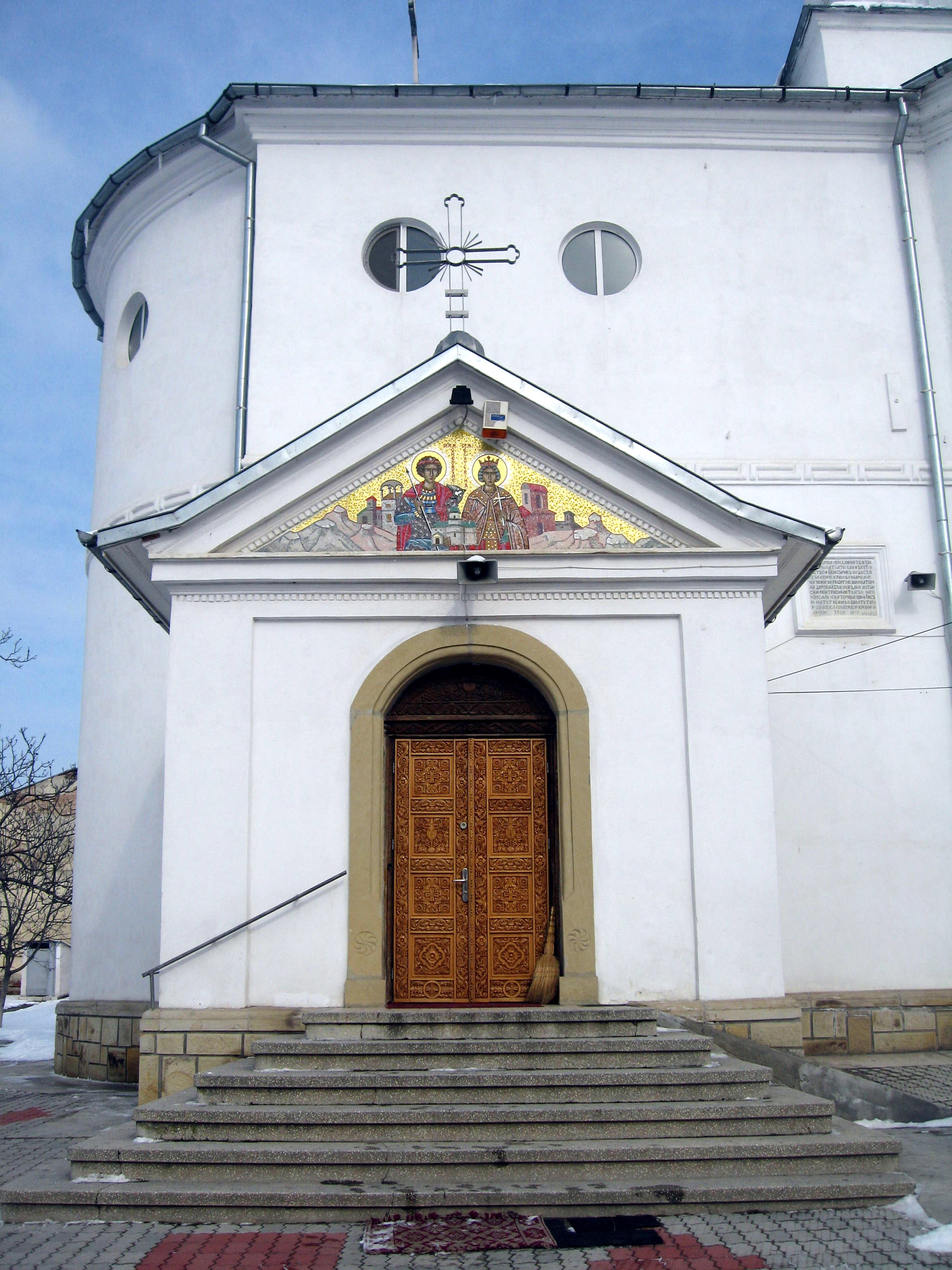
Entrance

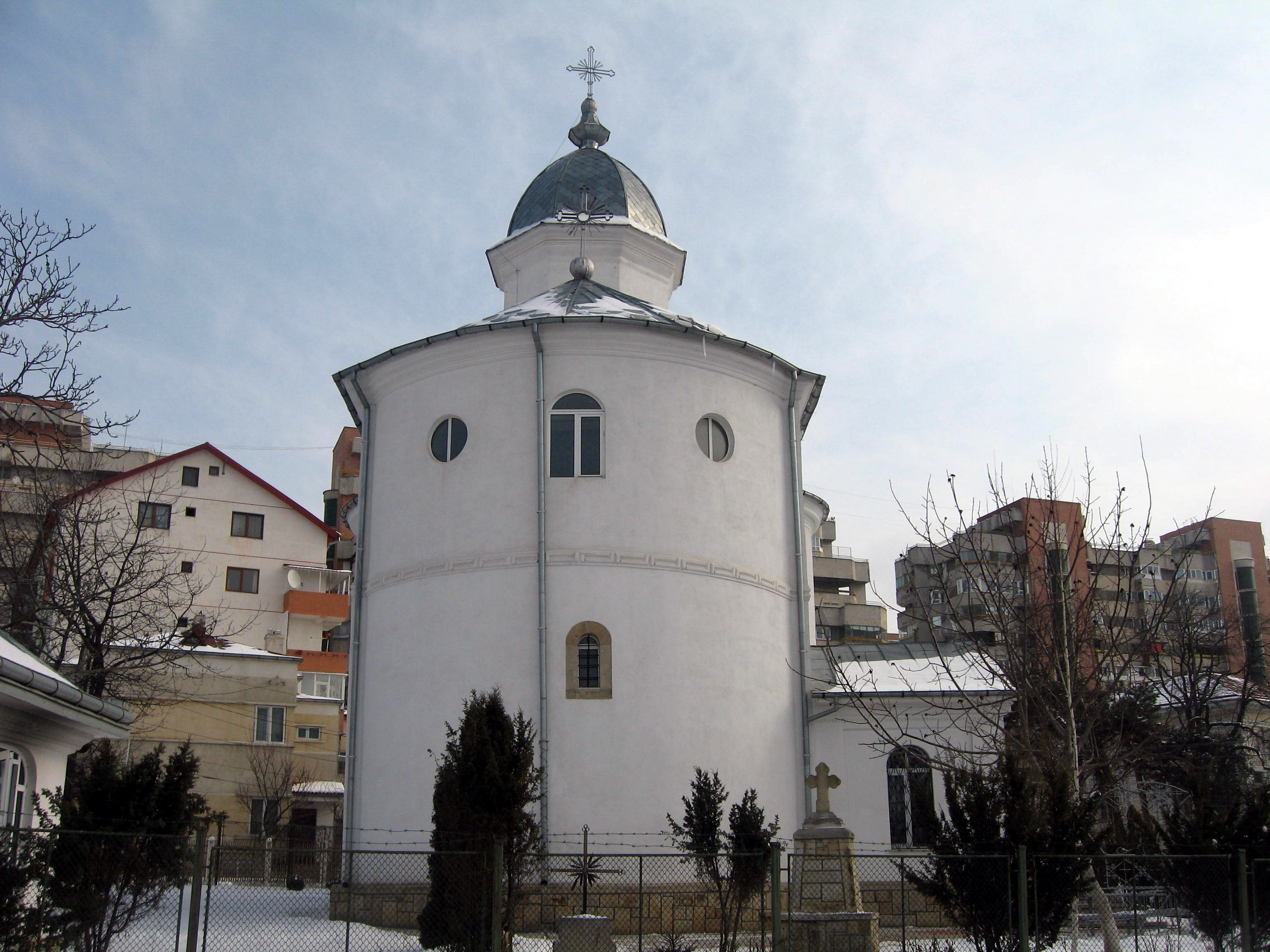
West end

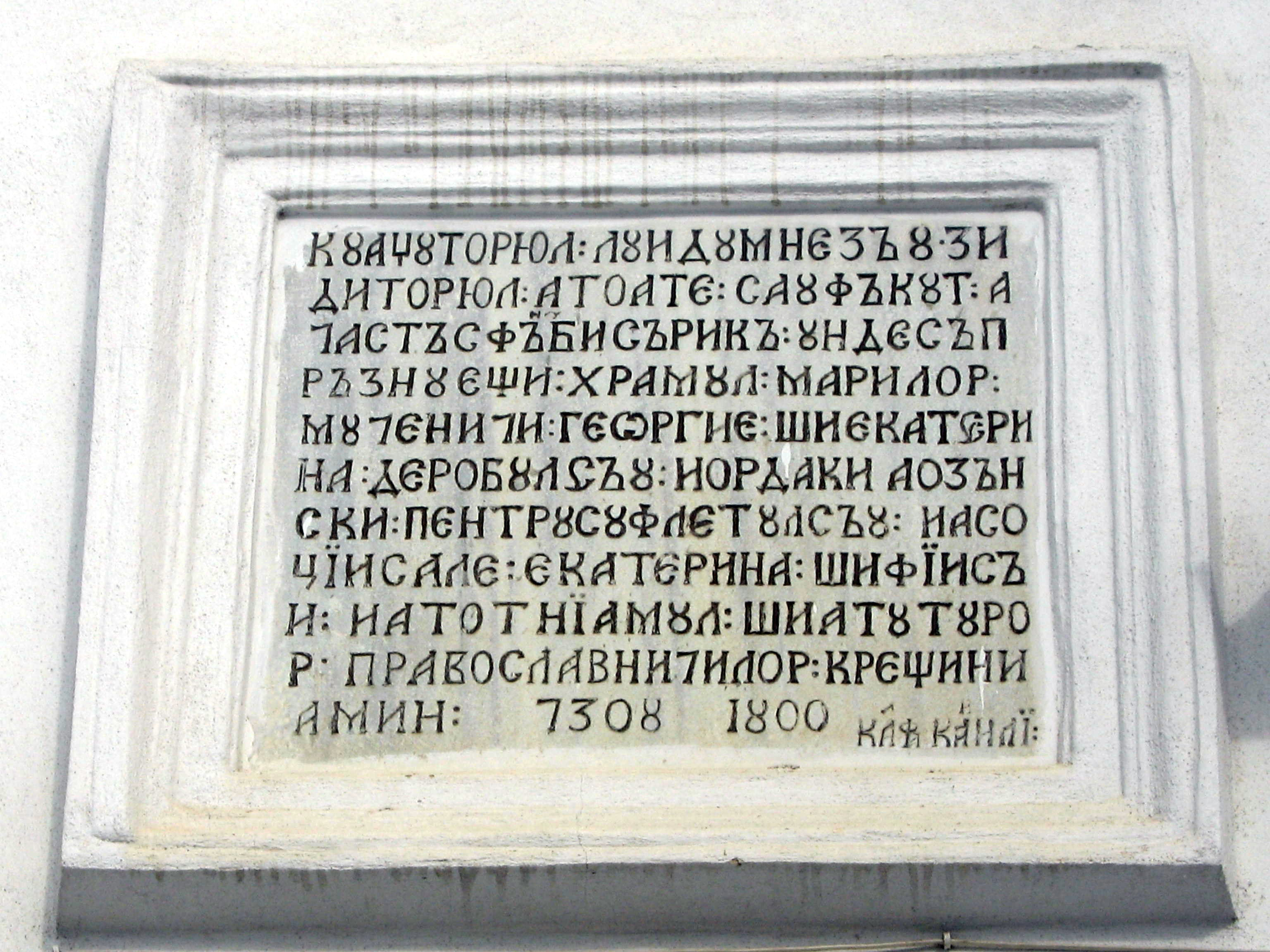
Dedication

The text on the dedication is written in the Romanian Cyrillic alphabet in a semi-scriptio continua:

KȣАЏYТОРЮΛ:ΛȣИДȣМНЄЗЪȣ:ЗИ

ДИТОРЮΛ:АТОАТЄ:САȣФЪKȣТ:А

ЧАСТЪСФЪБИСЪРИKЪ: ȣНДЄСЪП

РЪЗНȣЄЩИ:ХРАМȣΛ:МАРИΛОР:

МȣЧЄНИЧИ:ГЄѠРГИЄ:ШИЄKАТЄРИ

НА:ДЄРОБȣΛСЪȣ:ИОРДАKИ ΛОЗЪН

СKИ:ПЄНТРȣСYФΛЄΤȣΛСЪȣ: ИАСО

ЦÏИСАΛЄ:ЄKАТЄРИНА:ШИФÏИСЪ

И: ИАТОТНÏАМȣΛ:ШИАТȣTȣPO

P: ПРАВОСΛАВНИЧИΛΟΡ:KРЄЩИНИ

АМИН: 7308 1800 KAФА KAИΛÏ:

In the modern Romanian alphabet:

CUAGIUTORIUL:LUIDUMNEZĂU:ZI

DITORIUL:ATOATE:SAUFĂCUT:A

CEASTĂSFĂBISĂRICĂ: UNDESĂP

RĂZNUEȘTI: HRAMUL:MARILOR:

MUCENICI: GHEORGHIE:ȘIECATERI

NA:DEROBULSĂU:IORDACHI LOZĂN

SCHI:PENTRUSUFLETULSĂU: IASO

ȚIISALE:ECATERINA:ȘIFIIISĂ

I: IATOTNIIAMUL:ȘIATUTURO

R: PRAVOSLAVNICILOR:CREȘTINI

AMIN: 7308 1800 CAFA CAILII

The text reading:

Cu agiutoriul lui Dumnezău, ziditoriul a toate, sau făcut această sfă(ntă) bisărică unde să prăznuești hramul marilor mucenici, Gheorghie și Ecaterina, de robul său, Iordachi Lozănschi, pentru sufletul său (ș)i a soțiii sale, Ecaterina și fiii săi (ș)i a tot niiamul și a tuturor pravoslavnicilor creștini, Amin: 7308 1800 Ca(l)fa Ca(n)ilii.

”With the help of God, the builder of all, this holy church was built, where you can celebrate the patron saint of the great martyrs, George and Catherine, by his servant, Iordachi Lozănschi, for his soul and that of his wife, Catherine and his sons and of the whole family and of all Orthodox Christians, Amen: 7308 1800 Calfa Canilii.”
