= Bivol =

Bivol is a Slavic and Romanian (Moldovan) word meaning "ox" or "buffalo". It may refer to:

== People ==
- Alina Bivol (born 1996), Russian chess player
- Constantin Bivol (1885–1942), Bessarabian politician
- Dmitry Bivol (born 1990), Russian boxer
- Nicolae Bivol (1882–1940), Moldovan politician
- Victor Bivol (born 1977), Moldovan judoka

== Other ==
- Bivol.bg, a Bulgarian investigative media
