= Teodor Bârcă =

Moldovan politician (1894–1993)

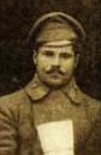

Member of Sfatul Țării
- In office 1917–1918

Personal details
- Born: 12 June 1894 Costești, Ialoveni, Bessarabia Governorate
- Died: 12 May 1993 (aged 98) Cotmeana, Argeș County, Romania

Teodor Bârcă (12 June 1894 – 12 May 1993) was a Bessarabian politician and professor, who on 27 March 1918 voted the union of Bessarabia with Romania. He was the vice president of Sfatul Țării, the parliament of Bessarabia at the time.

== Biography ==
Bârcă was born on 12 June 1894 in Costești, Ialoveni, then in the Bessarabia Governorate of the Russian Empire. He was a member of Sfatul Țării in 1917–1918. As vice-president of the parliament, he signed some acts, from and after March 27, together with Gheorghe Buruiană, another vice-president of the parliament.

== Gallery ==
Moldovan stamp, 1998

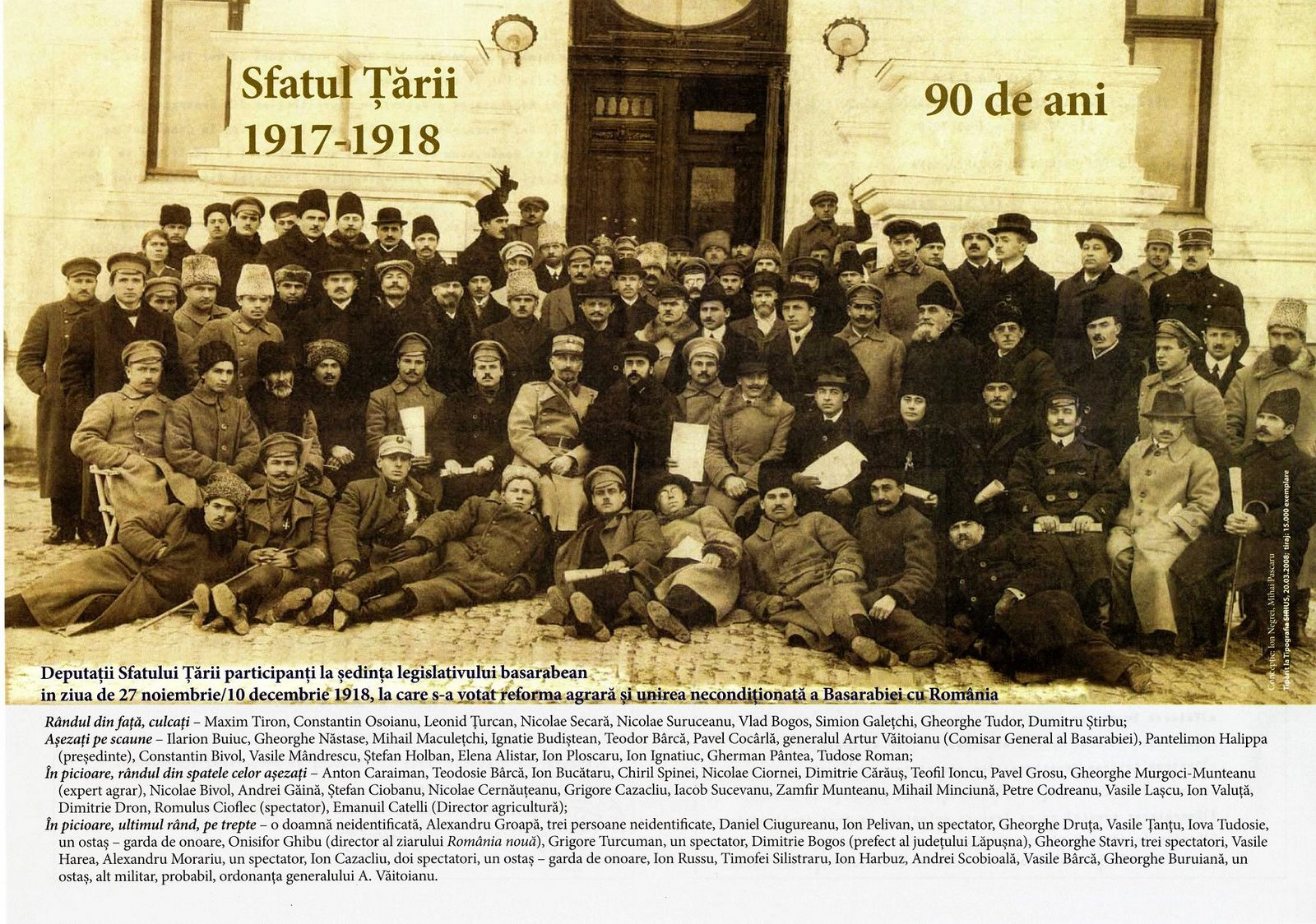
Teodor Bârcă and Sfatul Țării in 1918

== Bibliography ==
- Gheorghe E. Cojocaru (1998). Sfatul Țării: itinerar [Country Council: itinerary] (in Romanian). Chişinău: Civitas. ISBN 9975-936-20-2.
- Mihai Tașcă (27 June 2008). "Sfatul Țării și actualele autorități locale" [The Country Council and the current local authorities]. Timpul de dimineață (in Romanian). 114 (849): 16.
