= Bobeica =

- Commune
- Location in Moldova
- Coordinates: 46°59′N 28°28′E
- Country: Moldova
- District: Hîncești District
- Elevation: 660 ft (200 m)

Population (2014)
  - Total: 2,565
- Time zone: UTC+2 (EET)
  - Summer (DST): UTC+3 (EEST)
- Postal code: MD-3413
- Area code: +373 269

Bobeica is a commune in Hîncești District, Moldova. It is composed of three villages: Bobeica, Dahnovici and Drăgușeni.

== Notable people ==
- Constantin Bivol (born Costești, 1885 - death Chistopol, 1942) was an inhabitant of Dahnovici
