= Comrat Republic =

1906 autonomous Gagauz republic in Russia

Comrat Republic Κομράτ Ρεσπυβλικάσι (Note: At the time, the Gagauz language was written in the Greek alphabet.) (Gagauz) Republica de la Comrat (Romanian) Комратская республика (Russian)
- 6 January – 12 January 1906
- Flag

- Map of the Comrat Republic, roughly corresponding to Comrat Volost, within Russia's Bessarabia Governorate
- Capital: Comrat
- Common languages: Gagauz, also Romanian, Russian
- Religion: Orthodox Christianity
- Government: Autonomous republic
- Leader
  - 1906: Andrey Galatsan
- History
  - Declaration: 6 January 1906
  - Dissolution: 12 January 1906

Population
  - 1906 estimate: 10,000
Preceded by	Succeeded by
Russian Empire	Russian Empire
- Today part of: Moldova

The Comrat Republic (Gagauz: Κομράτ Ρεσπυβλικάσι, Komrat Respublikası; Romanian: Republica de la Comrat; Russian: Комратская республика, romanized: Komratskaya respublika) was an autonomous republic established in the village of Comrat, in the Bessarabia Governorate, during the Russian Revolution of 1905 in protest of the tsarist regime of the Russian Empire. It was created after a mutiny by Andrey Galatsan, a socialist revolutionary, with the support of the local Gagauz population. It lasted six days (from 6 January to 12 January) and is today viewed positively in Gagauzia (now in Moldova) as a premonition of the future Gagauz territorial autonomy.

== History ==
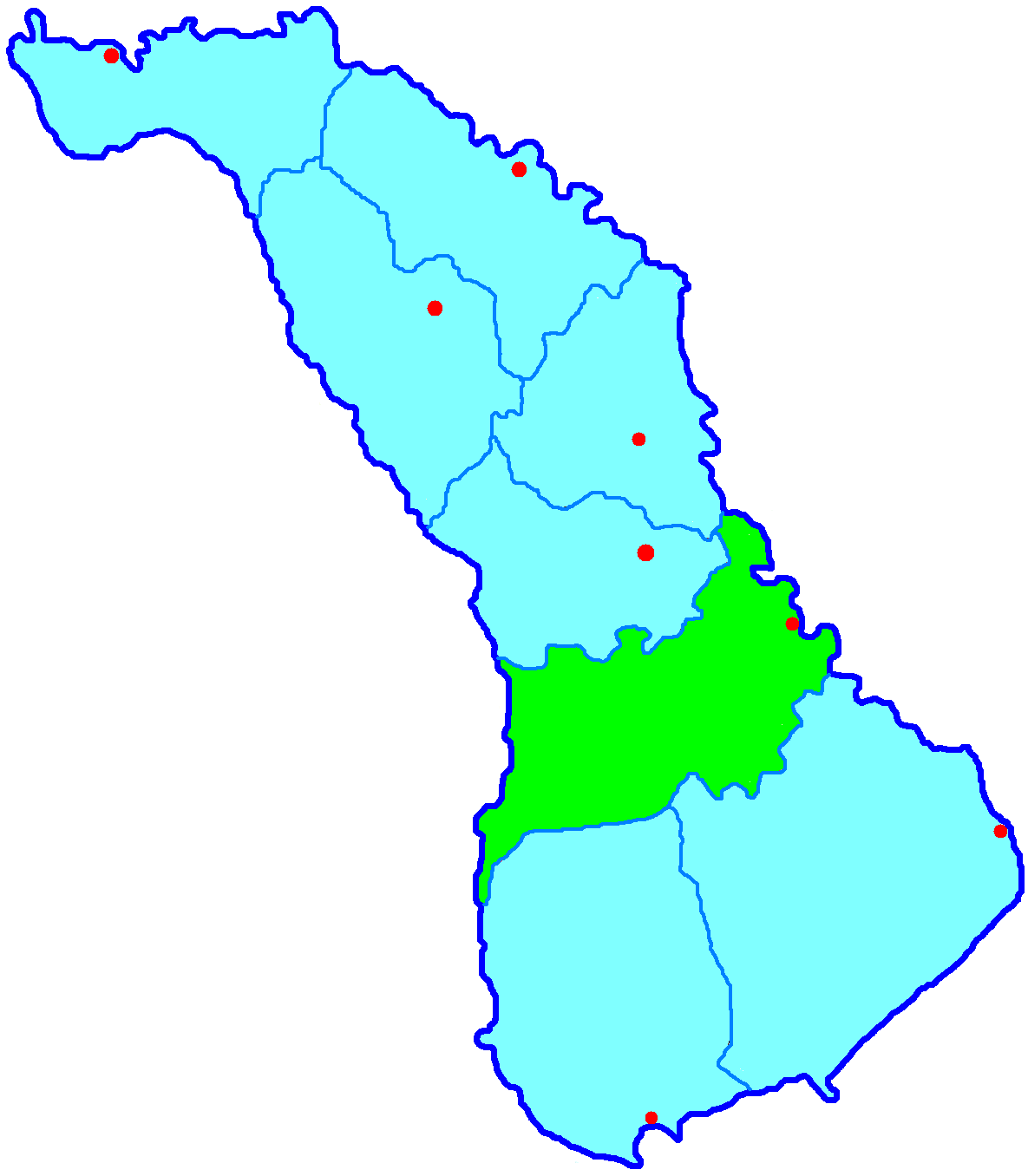
Map of the Bendersky Uyezd within the Bessarabia Governorate, where Comrat was located in 1906

In 1905, following the arrival of the 1905 Russian Revolution, the Gagauz people began to call for the abolition of tsarism in the Russian Empire. Thus, Andrey Galatsan, a student at the Kharkiv Polytechnic Institute and a revolutionary socialist, created a clandestine organization in the village of Comrat, with a Gagauz ethnic majority. Galatsan began to urge the Gagauz peasant population to join his fight for rights. Protests by them began, and they started demanding to stop the recruitment of Gagauz people into the Imperial Russian Army, education in the Gagauz language, free medical care and others. During this period, the idea of Gagauz territorial autonomy began to be considered for the first time.

On 6 January 1906, a demonstration began in Comrat that escalated into mutiny, with Galatsan's supporters overthrowing the local authorities and proclaiming the Comrat Republic. A committee under Galatsan's rule was established, and its first decisions were to repeal taxes, cancel IOUs and perform a land reform. Later, on 10 January, a Russian newspaper reported "Comrat, with a population of 10,000, is in the hands of the insurgents. Autonomy has been proclaimed. The authorities have been fired and arrested. The dragoons (a mounted infantry) are unarmed". The flag of the Socialist Revolutionary Party, a red flag with the Russian-language slogan Въ борьбѣ обрѣтешь ты право свое ("Through struggle you will attain your rights") printed on it, was promoted as a central symbol of the republic.

On 12 January, after six days, the rebellion was suppressed. Galatsan and several of his companions were tried for sedition and deported to Siberia.

During the times of the Soviet Union, the Comrat Republic was presented as a socialist and proletarian movement but not as an ethnic one. However, since the proclamation of the Autonomous Territorial Unit of Gagauzia, it has been regarded as a "sign" or "premonition" of the Gagauz autonomy, highlighting its socialist characteristics but especially the ethnic Gagauz ones. Today, one of the streets of Comrat is named after Galatsan.

== See also ==
- Gagauz Republic
- History of Gagauzia
