= Autonomous republic =

Type of administrative division similar to a province or state

An autonomous republic is a type of administrative division similar to a province or state. A significant number of autonomous republics can be found within the successor states of the Soviet Union, but the majority are located within Russia. Many of these republics were established during the Soviet period as Autonomous Soviet Socialist Republics, or ASSRs.

== Autonomous republics within the former republics of the Soviet Union ==
- Republics of Russia
- Azerbaijan: Nakhchivan Autonomous Republic
- Georgia:
  - Adjara,
  - Abkhazia (currently controlled by the pro-Russian separatist government of the Republic of Abkhazia),
  - South Ossetia (also controlled by a separatist pro-Russian government that designates themselves as an autonomous republic within Georgia, the government of South Ossetia)
- Ukraine: Crimea (disputed with and occupied by Russia)
- Uzbekistan: Karakalpakstan

== Eastern Europe ==
- Autonomous Republic of Northern Epirus
- Comrat Republic (1906, self-proclaimed)
- Republic of Tamrash

== French territories ==
The designation also can refer to the following 16 former French territories in Africa before 1960, when all gained independence, except for Djibouti, which voted in a referendum to remain part of France as an overseas department:

- Tunisia (1954)
- Togolese Republic (February 22, 1958)
- Malagasy Republic, today known as the Republic of Madagascar (October 14, 1958)
- Mali Federation, formed by the Sudanese Republic (now the Republic of Mali) and the Republic of Senegal (November 24, 1958)
- The Republic of the Congo, referred at the time as Middle Congo (November 28, 1958)
- Islamic Republic of Mauritania (November 28, 1958)
- Republic of Chad (November 28, 1958)
- Gabonese Republic (November 28, 1958)
- Ubangi-Shari, referred today as the Central African Republic (December 1, 1958)
- Republic of Dahomey, current Republic of Benin (December 4, 1958)
- Republic of Ivory Coast (December 4, 1958)
- Republic of Upper Volta, current Burkina Faso (December 11, 1958)
- Republic of Niger (December 19, 1958)
- Republic of Cameroon (January 1, 1960), unified with the British Cameroon a year later
- State of the Comoros (1961)
- Territory of the Afars and the Issas, known today as the Republic of Djibouti (1967)
- Republic of Cochinchina (1946–1949)

== See also ==
- Autonomous administrative division
