= Tătărăuca Veche =

- Commune
- Location in Moldova
- Coordinates: 48°18′N 27°59′E
- Country: Moldova
- District: Soroca District

Population (2014)
  - Total: 1,770
- Time zone: UTC+2 (EET)
  - Summer (DST): UTC+3 (EEST)

Tătărăuca Veche is a commune in Soroca District, Moldova. It is composed of six villages: Decebal, Niorcani, Slobozia Nouă, Tătărăuca Nouă, Tătărăuca Veche and Tolocănești.

== Demographics ==
=== Village populations ===
- Tătărăuca Veche (village) – 535
- Decebal – 104
- Niorcani – 520
- Slobozia Nouă – 314
- Tătărăuca Nouă – 443
- Tolocănești – 78

=== Notable people ===
- Teodosie Bârcă
- Petre Popa
- Chiril Spinei
- Grigore Turcuman
