= Saint Demetrius-Balș Church =

Heritage site in Iași County, Romania

Coordinates: 47°09′51″N 27°34′57″E

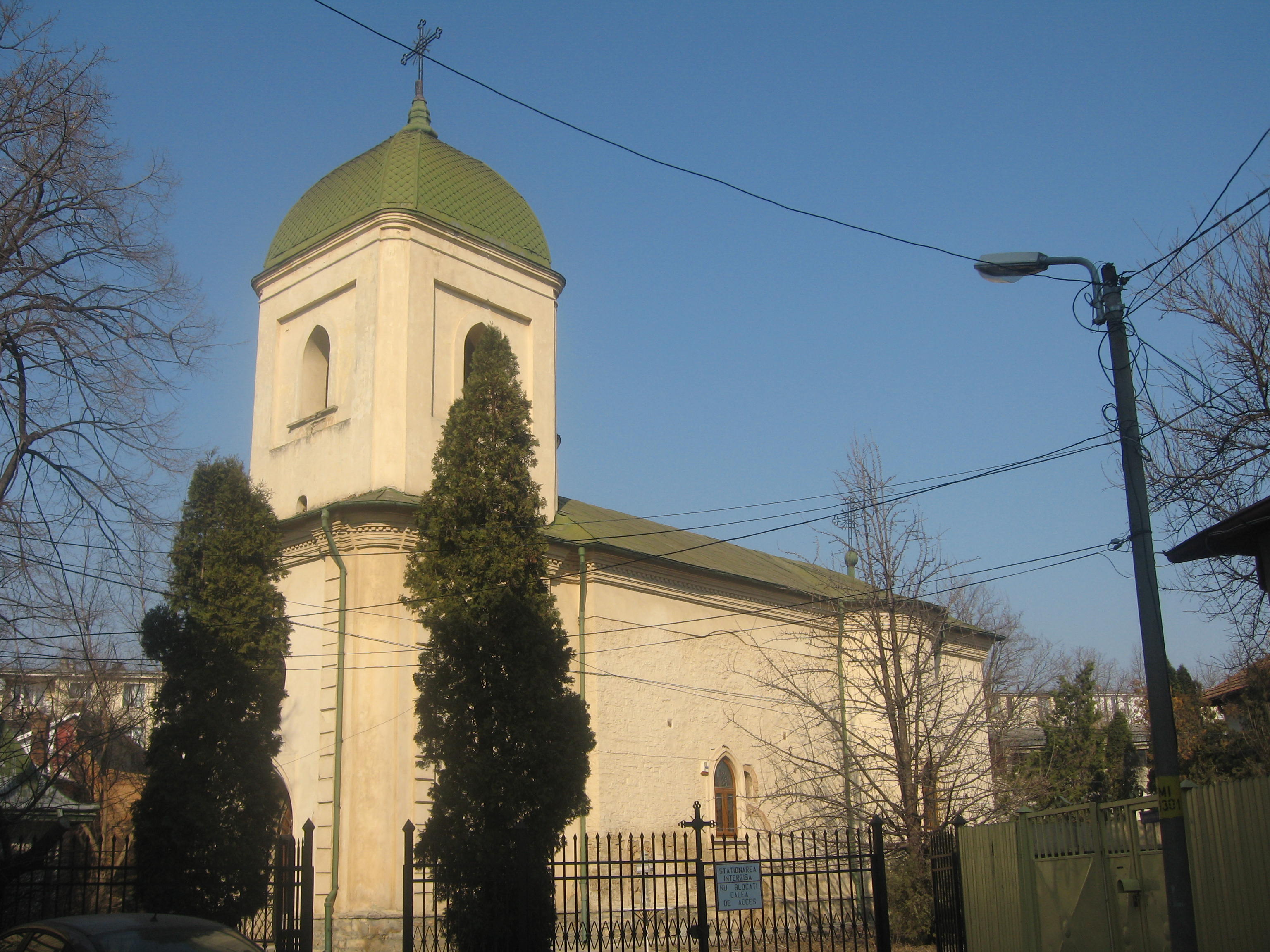
Saint Demetrius-Balș Church

Saint Demetrius-Balș Church (Romanian: Biserica Sfântul Dumitru-Balș) is a Romanian Orthodox church located at 14 Decembrie 1989 Street, nr. 15, in Iași, Romania. It is dedicated to Saint Demetrius of Thessaloniki.

The church was built in 1690 by medelnicer Ionașcu Balș (1663-1738). Belonging to the Moldavian style, it was devastated by fire in 1723; the blaze began in a nearby brick workshop or, according to other sources, in the church itself. Balș and his son Lupu rebuilt the church, adding stone walls and a new roof. Initially, the building was entered through an open terrace on the south side; its remnants can still be seen in the stonemasonry. There was a niche with an icon of Saint Demetrius, now partly hidden by a window. In 1781, a foyer was added on the western side, with a bell tower above. At that point, the entrance was moved to the west, through the closed foyer under the tower, while the other door was shut up behind a wall. For a long time, members of the Balș family financed the church, which had a separate administration, even though it was a filial of the Saint George-Lozonschi Church. Various princes of Moldavia, particularly members of the Mavrocordatos family, offered gifts to the parish.

In 1857, a grave was built for the Balș family in the vestibule, gathering remains from the cemetery in the churchyard. In 1900, eight headstones of the family were brought in from the cemetery and placed in the foyer walls. Five are in the Romanian Cyrillic alphabet, two in Greek and one is almost completely effaced. The plate for the crypt, made of Carrara marble, was vandalized by an individual who removed the Greek letters of gilt metal. A professor attempted to decipher the inscription in 1902, but could only make out a few words. At that point, another plaque was set up; the refurbishment was carried out by Gheorghe Balș.

Damaged by fire and earthquakes over time, the church was restored in 1897 by administrator Mihail Balș, following the plans of architect Iancu Catargiu. This is mentioned in a dedication above the entrance, and at the same time, a white marble plate with the names of several deceased was also installed. Serious repairs were undertaken in 1948-1952 in order to fix damage caused during World War II. New renovations took place in 1994-1998; the iconostasis was repaired and the interior was repainted in neo-Byzantine fresco. The church has two bells from 1690 and 1692, while the iconostasis was carved in classic Baroque around 1800.

The church is listed as a historic monument by Romania's Ministry of Culture and Religious Affairs.

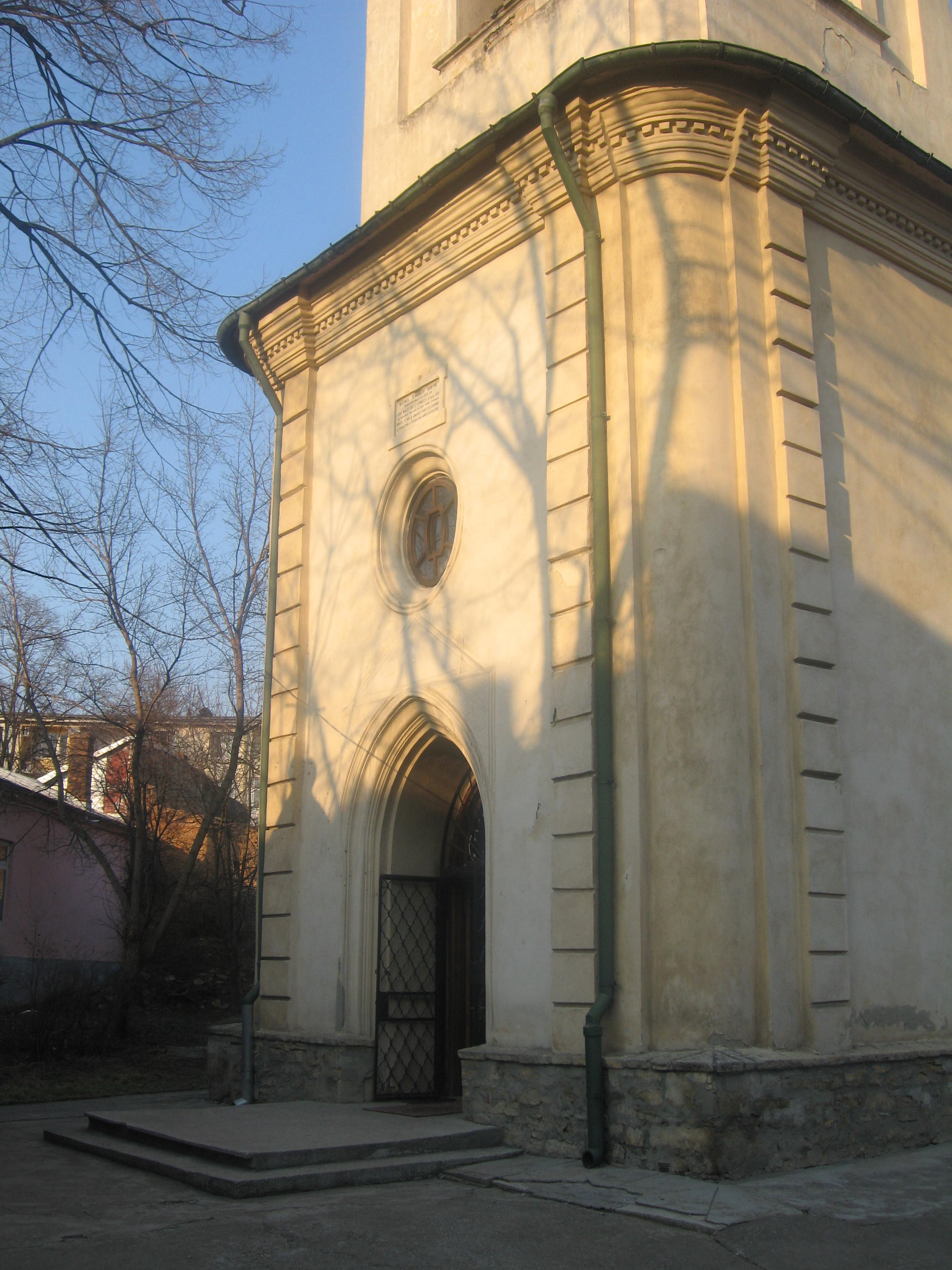
Entrance

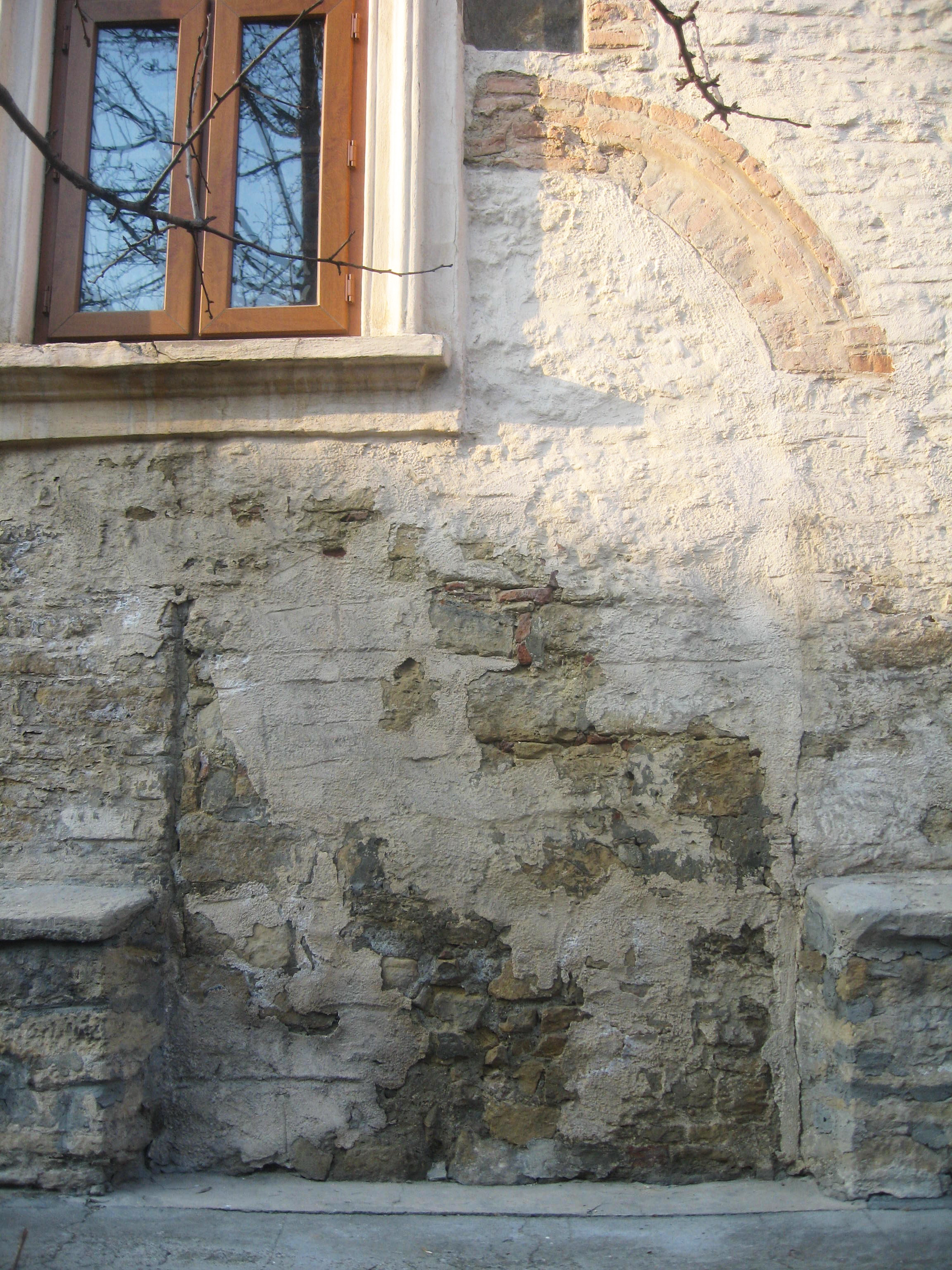
Detail

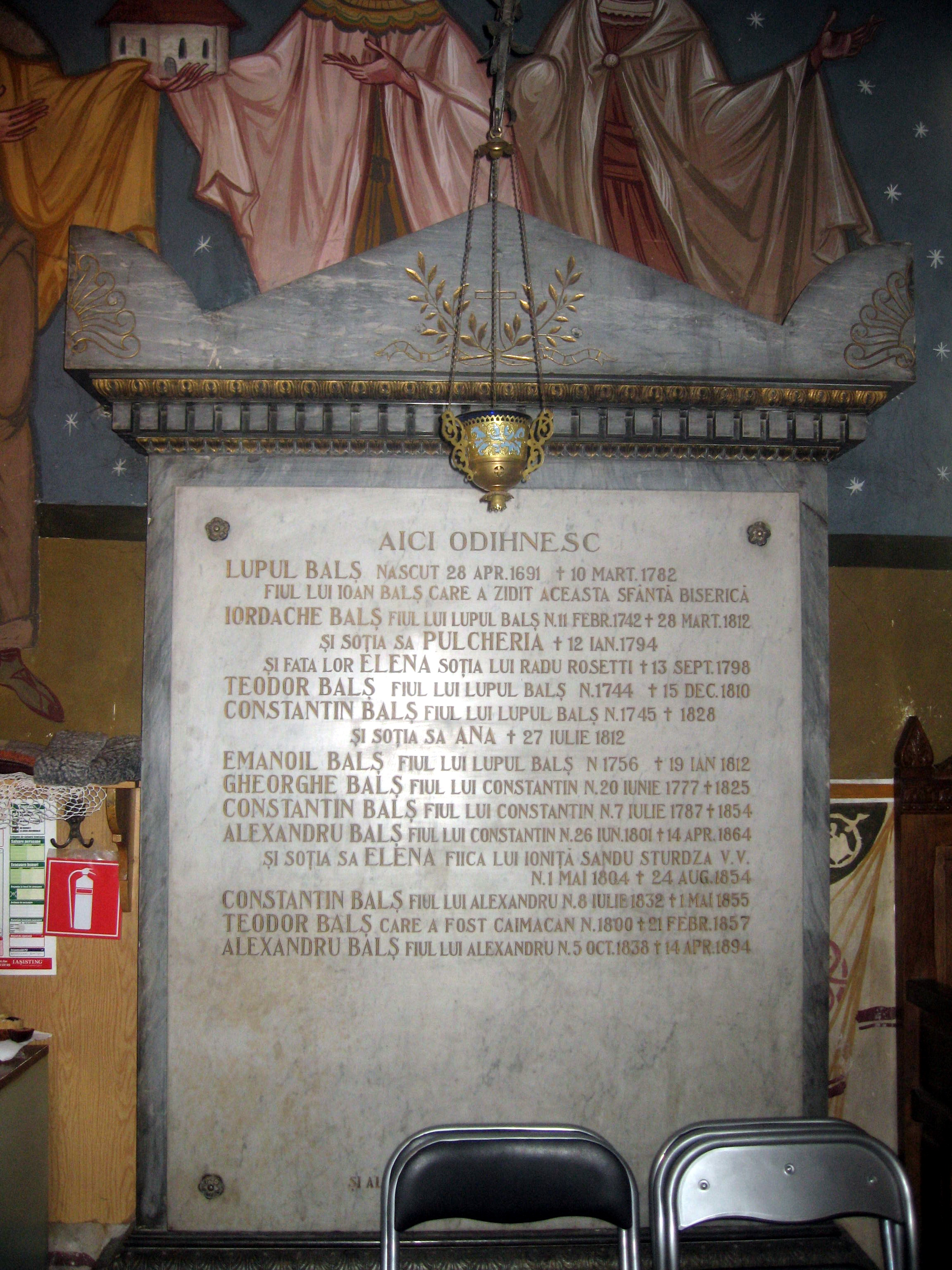
Balș grave

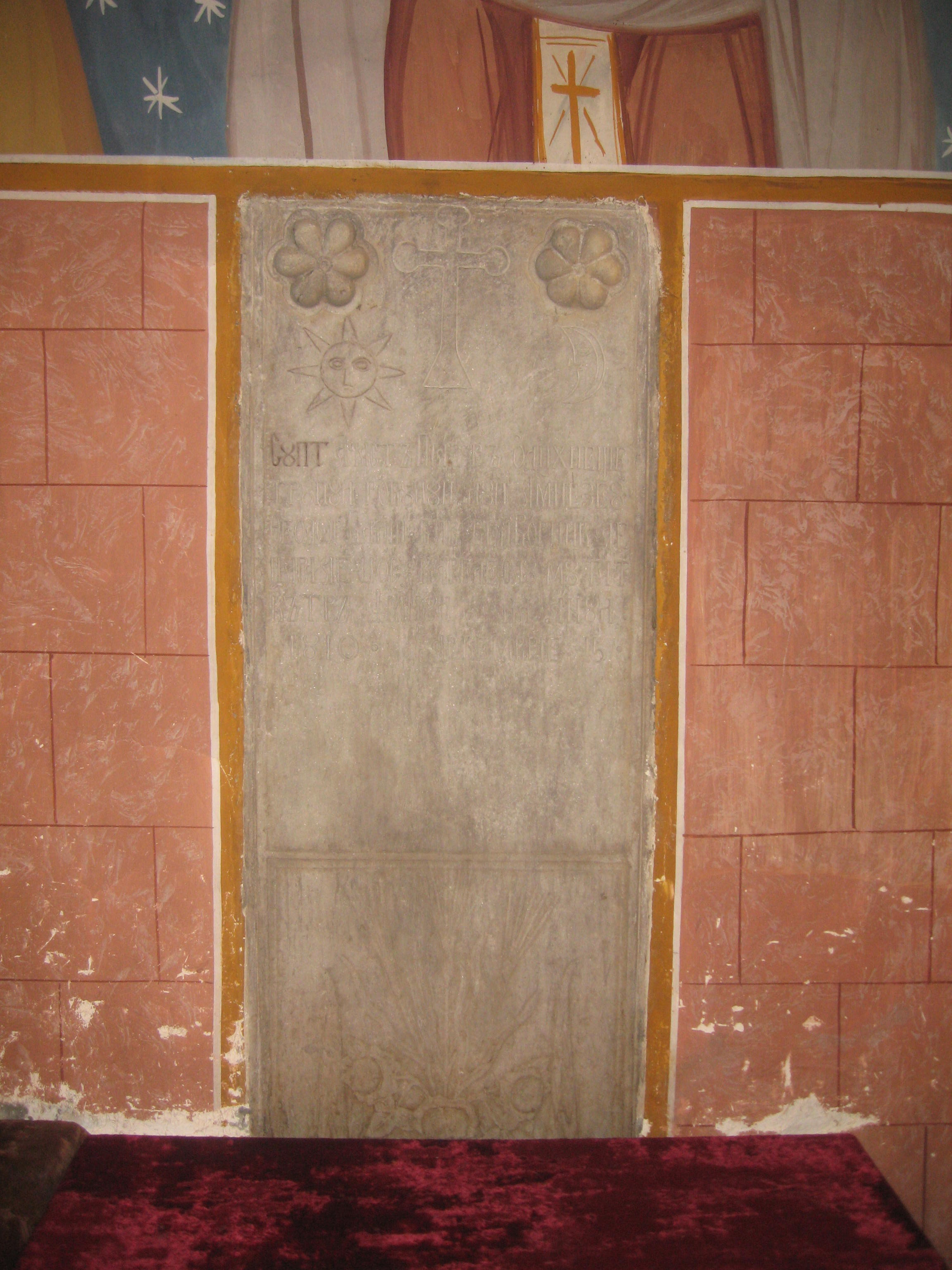
Older gravestone

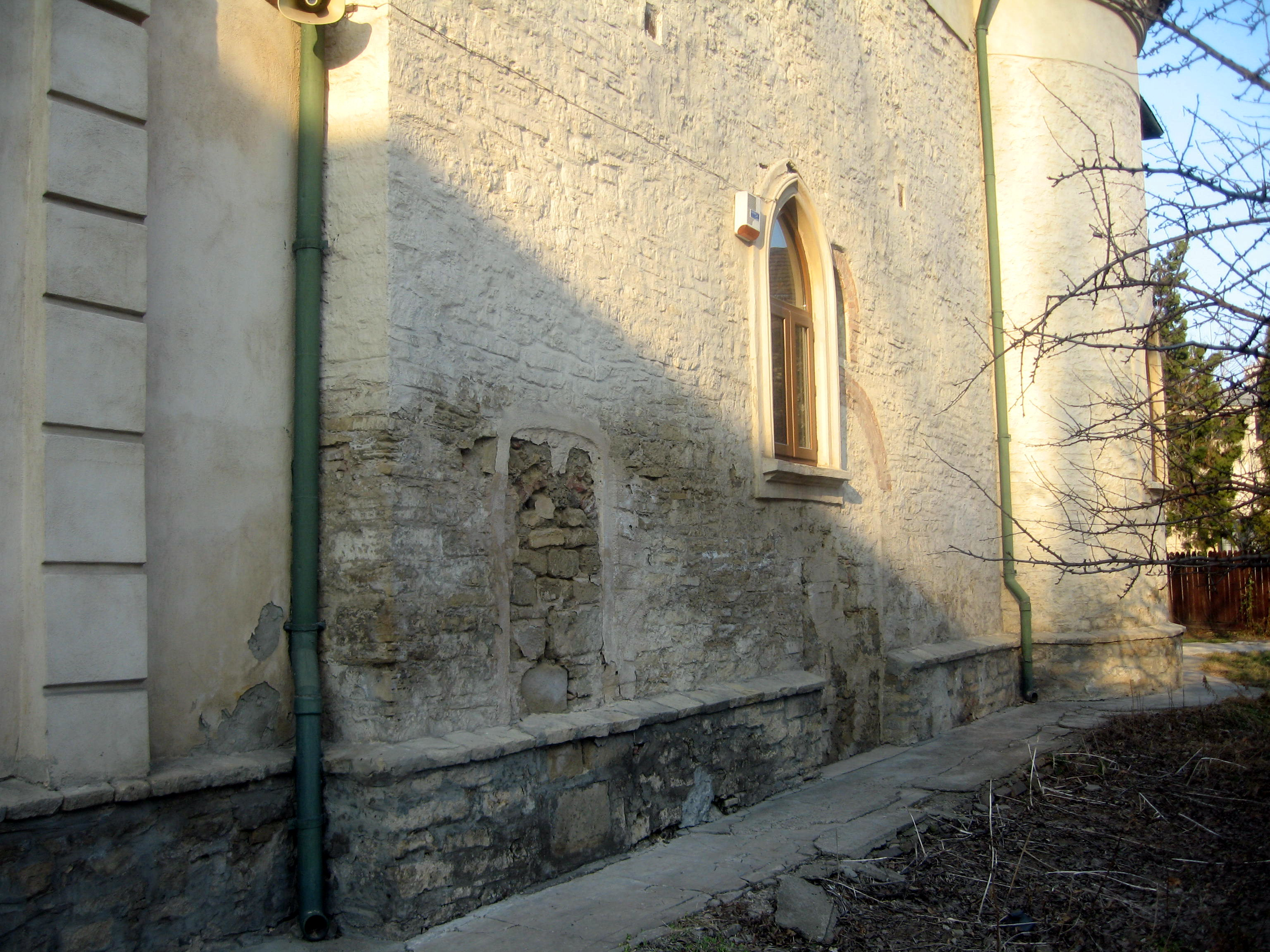
Side view
