= Bendersky Uyezd =

Subdivision of the Bessarabia Governorate of the Russian Empire

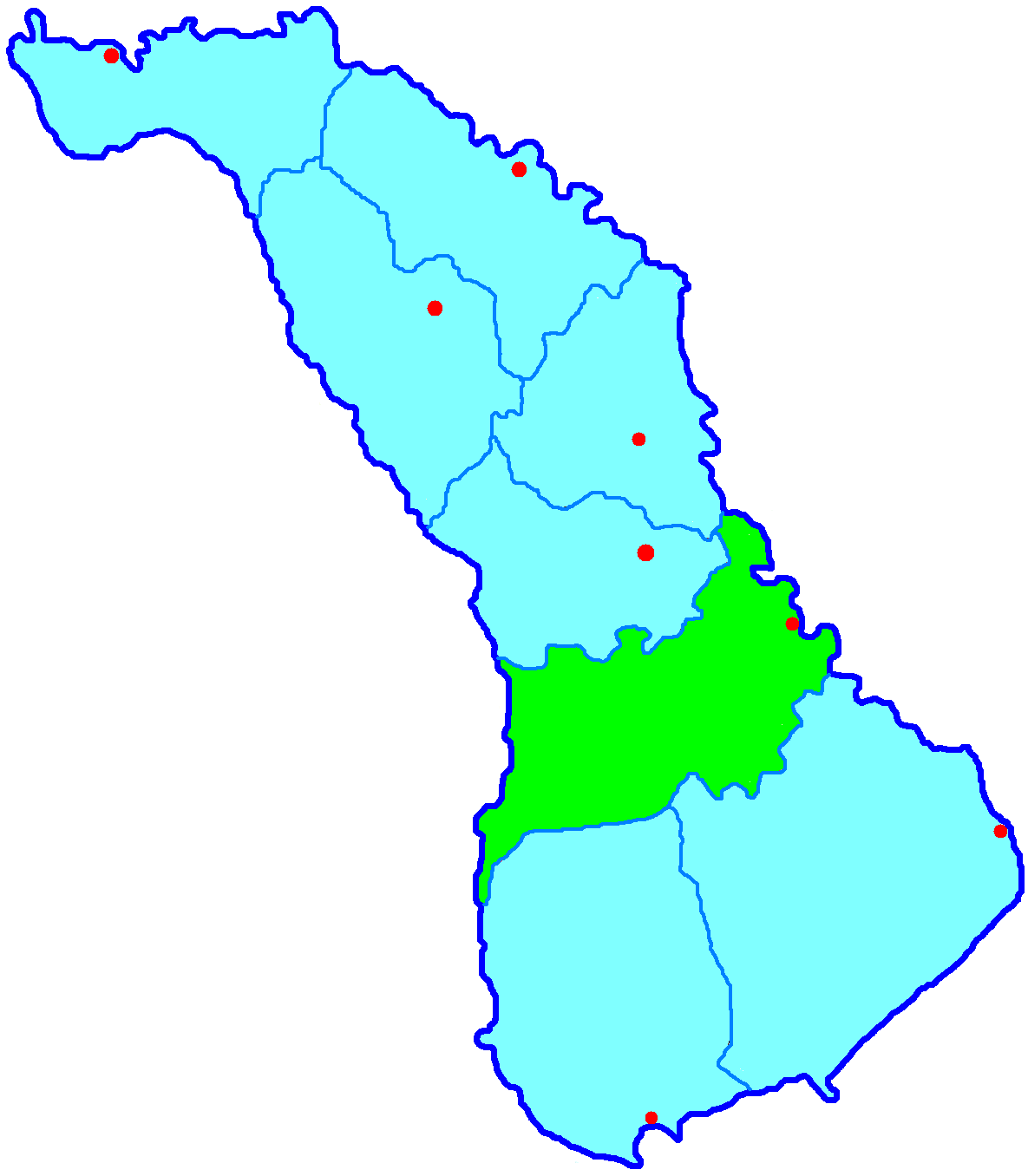
Map of the uyezd

Bendersky County (Russian: Бендерский уезд, romanized: Bendersky Uyezd) was an uezd, one of the subdivisions of the Bessarabia Governorate of the Russian Empire. It was situated in the southern part of the governorate. Its administrative centre was Bender.

== Demographics ==
At the time of the Russian Empire Census of 1897, Bendersky Uyezd had a population of 194,915. Of these, 45.1% spoke Moldovan and Romanian, 14.1% Gagauz or Turkish, 10.8% Ukrainian, 9.5% Russian, 8.5% Yiddish, 7.6% Bulgarian, 2.9% German, 0.6% Polish, 0.4% Romani, 0.1% Greek, 0.1% Belarusian and 0.1% Armenian as their native language.

== See also ==
- Comrat Republic
- Tighina County (Romania)
- Tighina County (Moldova)
