= Petre Popa =

Moldovan writer and activist (born 1958)

- Born: 7 May 1958; Tătărăuca Veche
- Known for: director of the Theater "Veniamin Apostol"
- Awards: Order of the Star of Romania

Petre Popa (born 7 May 1958) is a writer and activist from Moldova. He served as the head of the Department of Culture of the Soroca District (1999–2007) and has been the director of the Theater "Veniamin Apostol" in Soroca since 2009. Petre Popa is a member of the Moldovan Writers' Union.

== Awards ==
- Petre Popa was awarded, by a presidential decree, with Romania's highest state decoration – the Order of the Star of Romania.
- Laureat al Festivalului naţional de poezie din Sighetu Marmaţiei, 1990.

== Works ==
- Apariţii: „Rădăcina aripilor”, Chişinău, 1993;
- „Prinţul moştenitor”, Bucharest, 1998;
- „Puiul ursului de circ”, Chişinău, 1999;
- „Intuiţie”, Chişinău, 2000;
- „Ritmuri şi anotimpuri”. Poezii şi cântece pentru copii, Buzău, 2007
- „AiciUndeva”, Chişinău, 2008;
- „Dor pribeag, cântece”, Chişinău, 2009;
- „Asimetrii, poeme”, Chişinău, 2009.
