= Costești, Ialoveni =

Village in Moldova

Costești
- Commune and village
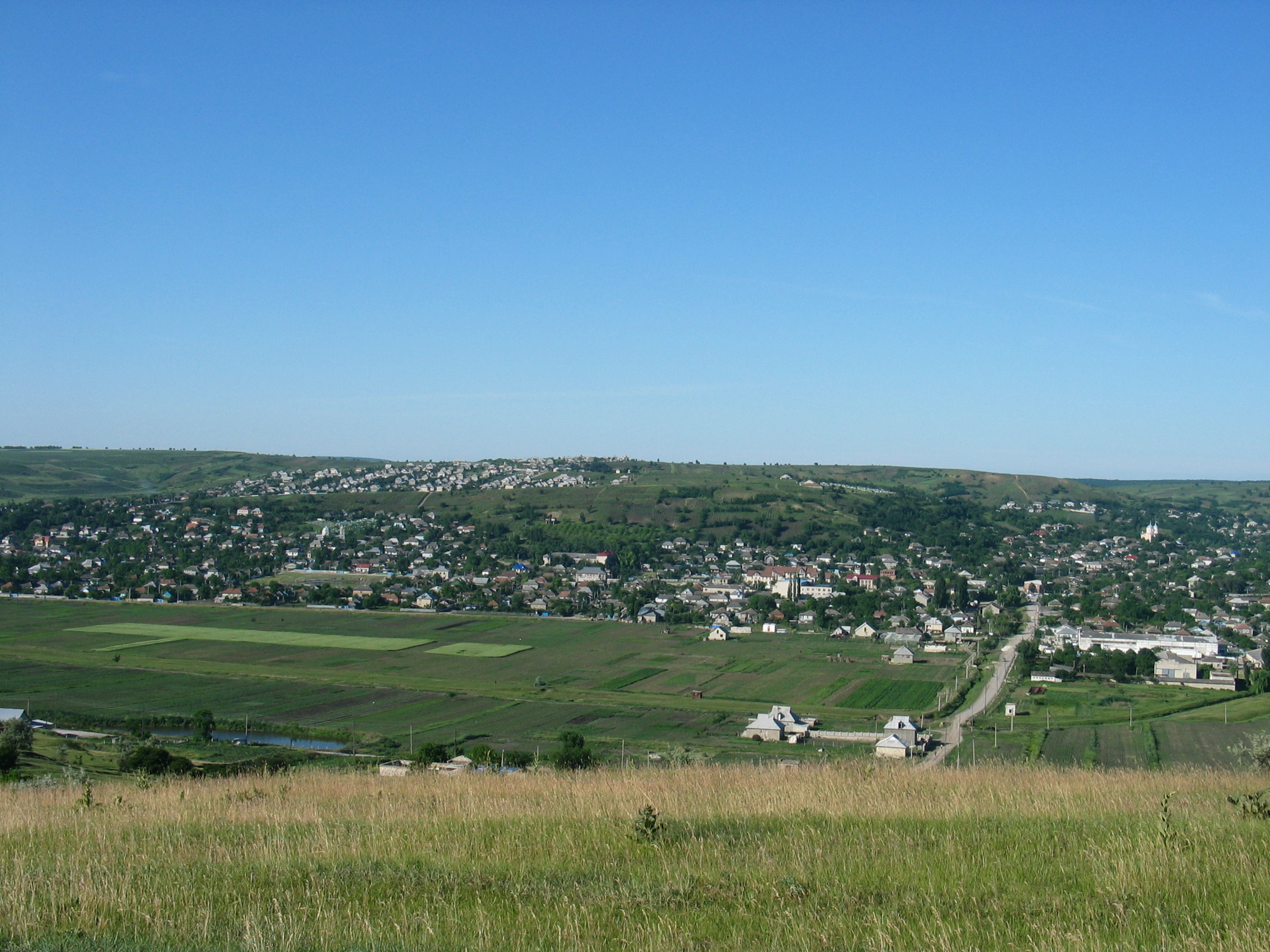

- Location in Moldova
- Coordinates: 46°52′4″N 28°46′8″E
- Country: Moldova
- County: Ialoveni
- Settled: 1573

Government
  - Mayor: Ion Marandici

Area
  - Total: 68.82 km^{2} (26.57 sq mi)

Population (2014 census)
  - Total: 10,907
  - Density: 158.5/km^{2} (410.5/sq mi)
- Time zone: UTC+2 (EET)
  - Summer (DST): UTC+3 (EEST)
- Postal code: MD-6813

Costești is a village in Ialoveni District, in central Moldova, with a population of 11,128 at the 2004 census. It is the second largest rural locality in the country by population, three times larger than the homonymous city in the north of Moldova.

== Notable people ==
- Teodor Bârcă, teacher and politician
- Constantin Bivol, agriculturalist and politician
- Victor Stepaniuc, historian and politician
- Ion Sula, politician

== Externals links ==
- Media related to Costești, Ialoveni at Wikimedia Commons
