= Kishinyovsky Uyezd =

Subdivision of the Bessarabia Governorate of the Russian Empire

Kishinyovsky County (Russian: Кишинёвский уезд, romanized: Kishinyovsky Uyezd) was an uezd, one of the subdivisions of the Bessarabia Governorate of the Russian Empire. It was situated in the central part of the governorate. Its administrative centre was Kishinev (Chișinău).

== Demographics ==
At the time of the Russian Empire Census of 1897, Kishinyovsky Uyezd had a population of 279,657. Of these, 62.9% spoke Moldovan and Romanian, 19.5% Yiddish, 11.9% Russian, 1.9% Ukrainian, 1.3% Polish, 0.8% German, 0.7% Romani, 0.4% Bulgarian, 0.2% Armenian, 0.1% Greek and 0.1% Tatar as their native language.

== See also ==
- Chișinău County
- Lăpușna County (Moldova)
- Lăpușna County (Romania)
