= Beletsky Uyezd =

Subdivision of the Bessarabia Governorate of the Russian Empire

Beletsky County (Russian: Белецкий уезд, romanized: Beletsky Uyezd) was an uezd, one of the subdivisions of the Bessarabia Governorate of the Russian Empire. It was situated in the northwestern part of the governorate. Its administrative centre was Bălți (Beltsy).

== Demographics ==
At the time of the Russian Empire Census of 1897, Beletsky Uyezd had a population of 211,448. Of these, 66.3% spoke Moldovan and Romanian, 12.9% Yiddish, 11.4% Ukrainian, 6.7% Russian, 1.0% German, 0.7% Romani, 0.7% Polish, 0.1% Armenian, 0.1% Belarusian and 0.1% Greek as their native language.

== See also ==
- Bălți County (Romania)
- Bălți County (Moldova)
