= History of Gagauzia =

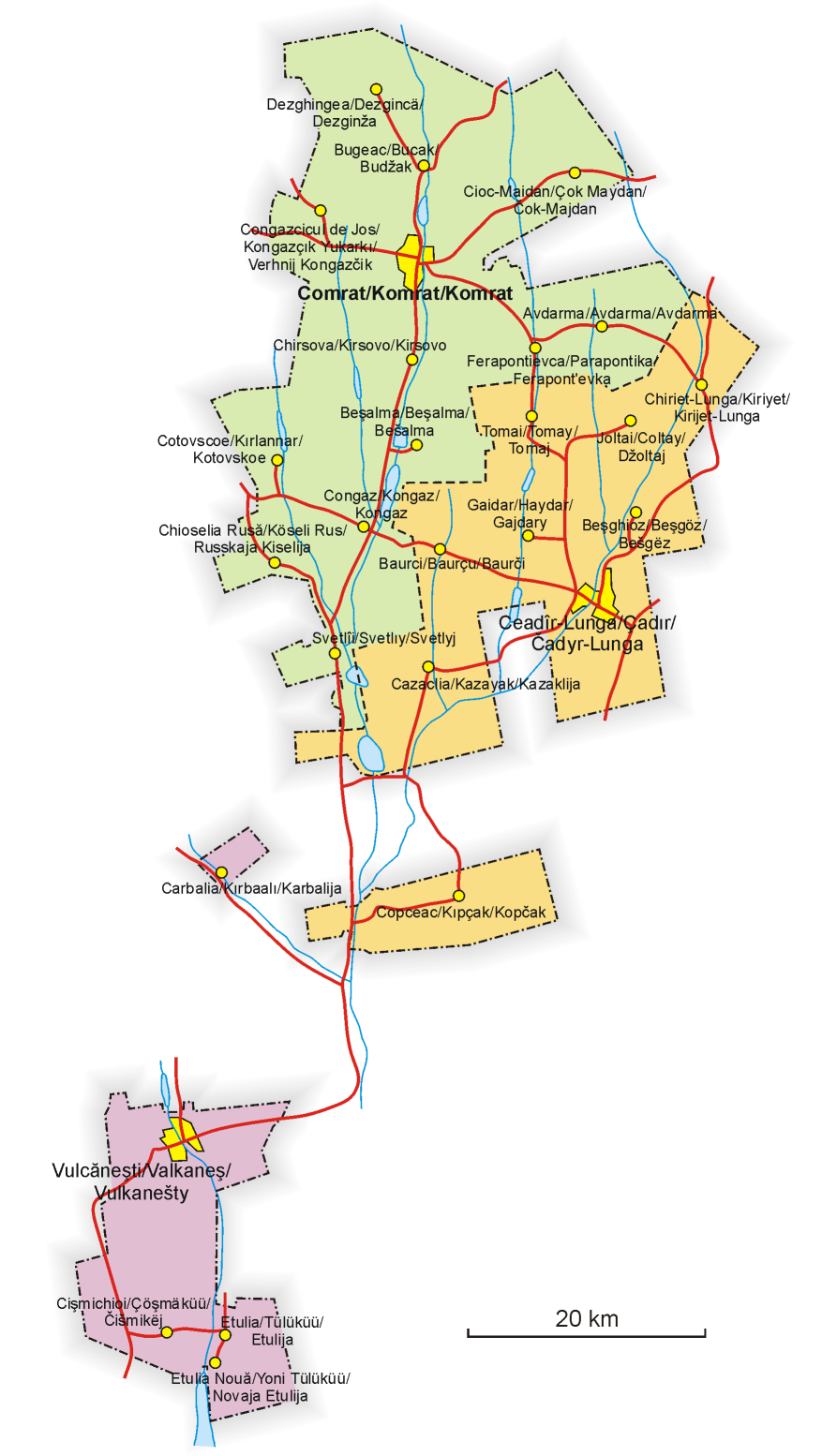
Map of Gagauzia

The history of Gagauzia dates back to ancient times. The larger area, known as Bessarabia, previously the eastern half of the Principality of Moldavia, was annexed by the Russian Empire in 1812. The Gagauz have been ruled by the Russian Empire (1812–1917), Romania (1918–1940 and 1941–1944), the Soviet Union (1940–1941 and 1944–1991), and Moldova (1917–1918 and 1991 to date).

== Middle Ages ==
The Gagauz people are said to be descended from the Seljuk Turks that settled in Dobruja, together with the Pechenegs, Uz (Oghuz) and Cuman (Kipchak) people that followed the Anatolian Seljuk Sultan İzzeddin Keykavus II (1236-1276). More specifically, one clan of Oghuz Turks migrated to the Balkans during the inter-tribal conflicts with other Turks. This Oghuz Turk clan converted from Islam to Orthodox Christianity after settling in the Eastern Balkans (nowadays in Bulgaria) and were called Gagauz people.

== Russian Empire ==
In 1812 Bessarabia, previously eastern half of the Principality of Moldavia became part of the Russian Empire, and Nogai tribes that inhabited several villages in south Bessarabia (or Budjak) were forced to leave. Between 1812 and 1846, Russians settled the Gagauz people from what is nowadays eastern Bulgaria (which remained under Ottoman Empire) to the orthodox Bessarabia, mainly in the settlements vacated by the Nogai tribes. They settled there in parallel with Bessarabian Bulgarians in Avdarma, Comrat, Congaz, Tomai, Cişmichioi, and other former Nogai villages. Some Gagauz were also settled in the part of the Principality of Moldavia that did not come under Russian control in 1812, but within several years village by village moved to the compact area they inhabit today in the south of Bessarabia.

== Soviet Union ==
During World War II, the Soviet created Moldavian Soviet Socialist Republic was invaded by the forces of Nazi Germany.

Gagauz nationalism remained an intellectual movement during the 1980s, but strengthened by the end of the decade, as the Soviet Union began to embrace democratic ideals. In 1988, activists from the local intelligentsia aligned with other ethnic minorities to create a movement known as the "Gagauz People". A year later, the "Gagauz People" held its first assembly in which a resolution was passed to demand the creation an autonomous territory in southern Moldova, with the city of Comrat as its capital. The Gagauz national movement intensified when the Romanian language was accepted as the official language of the Republic of Moldova in August 1989, replacing Russian, the official language of the USSR. A part of the multi-ethnic population of southern Moldova regarded this decision with concern, precipitating a lack of confidence in the central government in Chişinău. The Gagauz were also worried about the implications for them if Moldova reunited with Romania, as seemed increasingly likely at the time. In November 1989, the Gagauz ASSR within Moldova was declared.

== Independent Moldova ==
In August 1990, Comrat declared itself an autonomous republic, but the Moldovan government annulled the declaration as unconstitutional. At that time, Stepan Topal emerged as the leader of the Gagauz national movement. Support for the Soviet Union remained high, with a referendum in March 1991 returning an almost unanimous vote in favor of remaining part of the USSR. The referendum, however, was boycotted by Moldovans in Gagauzia, as well as in the rest of Moldova. Many Gagauz supported the Moscow coup attempt in August 1991, and in September, Transnistria declared itself independent, thus further straining relations with Chişinău. However, when the Moldovan parliament voted on whether Moldova should become independent on 27 August 1991, six of the twelve Gagauz deputies in Moldovan parliament voted in favor, while the other six did not participate. As a consequence, the Moldovan government toned down its pro-Romanian stance and paid more attention to minority rights.

In February 1994, President Mircea Snegur promised the Gagauz autonomy, but he was against outright independence. He was also opposed to the suggestion that Moldova become a federal state made up of three republics: Moldova, Gagauzia and Transnistria. In 1994, the Parliament of Moldova awarded to "the people of Gagauzia" (through the adoption of the new Constitution of Moldova) the right of "external self-determination", should the status of the country change. In other words, if the case was that Moldova decided to join another country (by all accounts, that would be Romania), then the Gagauz would be entitled to decide, by means of a self-determination referendum, whether to remain part of the new state or not. On 23 December 1994, the Parliament of the Republic of Moldova accepted the "Law on the Special Legal Status of Gagauzia" (Gagauz: Gagauz Yeri). The law entered into force on 14 January 1995, resolving the dispute peacefully. 23 December is now a Gagauz holiday. Many European human rights organizations recognize and promote Gagauzia as a successful model for resolving ethnic conflicts. Gagauzia is now a "national-territorial autonomous unit" with three official languages, Moldovan, Gagauz, and Russian.

Three cities and twenty-three communes were included in the Autonomous Gagauz Territory: all localities with over 50% of Gagauz, and those localities with between 40% and 50% of Gagauz, which expressed their desire to be included as a result of referendums to determine Gagauzia's borders. In 1995, Gheorghe Tabunșcic was elected to serve as the Governor (Moldovan: Guvernator, Gagauz: Bashkan) of Gagauzia for a four-year term, as were the deputies of the local parliament, "The People's Assembly", with Petru Pașalî as chairman.

Dumitru Croitor won the 1999 Governor elections and began to make use of the rights granted to the Governor by the 1994 agreement. The central authorities of Moldova proved unwilling to accept the results initiating a lengthy stand-off between the autonomy and Chişinău. Finally Croitor resigned in 2002 due to the pressure from the Moldovan government which accused him of abuse of authority, relations with the separatist authorities of Transnistria and other charges. The central electoral commission of Gagauzia did not register Croitor as a candidate for the post of the Governor in the subsequent elections and Tabunșcic was elected in what was described as unfair elections.

On 1 April 2020, the COVID-19 pandemic reached Gagauzia.

== See also ==
- Politics of Moldova
- History of Moldova
- History of the Soviet Union
- Communist Party of Moldavia
