= Soroksky Uyezd =

Subdivision of the Bessarabia Governorate of the Russian Empire

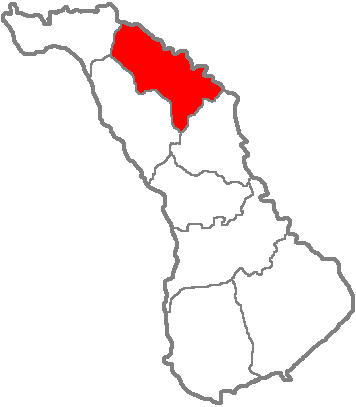
Sorotsky County in red

Soroksky County (pre-reform Russian: Сорокскій уѣздъ, romanized: Soroksky Uyezd) was an uezd, one of the subdivisions of the Bessarabia Governorate of the Russian Empire. It was situated in the northern part of the governorate. Its administrative centre was Soroca.

Soroksky Uyezd was created in 1836 alongside Beletsky Uyezd from Yassky Uyezd which then ceased to exist. In 1918, after the Union of Bessarabia with Romania, the county became part of the Kingdom of Romania until 1941, when Moldavian SSR was created as a result of the Soviet occupation of Bessarabia and Northern Bukovina. Finally, in 1949, the "uyezd" territorial subdivision was abolished and three new raions (districts) were created, one of which retained the name as Raion Soroca.

== Demographics ==
At the time of the Russian Empire Census of 1897, Soroksky Uyezd had a population of 218,861. Of these, 63.2% spoke Moldovan and Romanian, 16.0% Ukrainian, 14.2% Yiddish, 4.8% Russian, 0.8% Polish, 0.5% German, 0.2% Romani and 0.1% Armenian as their native language.

== See also ==
- Soroca County (Romania)
- Soroca County (Moldova)
