= Bessarabia Governorate =

1812–1917 unit of Russia

Coordinates: 47°01′28″N 28°49′56″E

- Governorate
- 1812–1918
- Coat of arms

- Location in the Russian Empire
- Capital: Kishinev (Chișinău)
- Area
  - (1897): 45,632.42 km^{2} (17,618.78 sq mi)
- Population
  - (1897): 1,935,412
- History
  - Established: 1812
  - Abolished: 1918
Preceded by	Succeeded by
Principality of Moldavia; United Principalities of Moldavia and Wallachia	Moldavian Democratic Republic; Principality of Moldavia

The Bessarabia Governorate (Note: Russian: Бессарабская губерния, pre-reform orthography: Бессара́бская губе́рнія, romanized: Bessarábskaya gubérniya; Romanian: Gubernia Basarabia; Ukrainian: Бессара́бська губе́рнія, romanized: Bessarábsʼka hubérniia; Bulgarian: Бесара́бска губе́рния, romanized: Besarábska gubérniya) was a province (guberniya) of the Russian Empire, with its administrative centre in Kishinev (Chișinău). It consisted of an area of 45,632.42 square kilometres (17,618.78 mi^{2}) and a population of 1,935,412 inhabitants. The Bessarabia Governorate bordered the Podolia Governorate to the north, the Kherson Governorate to the east, the Black Sea to the south, Romania to the west, and Austria to the northwest. It roughly corresponds to what is now most of Moldova and some parts of Chernivtsi and Odesa Oblasts of Ukraine.

It included the eastern part of the Principality of Moldavia along with the neighboring Ottoman-ruled territories annexed by Russia by the Treaty of Bucharest following the Russo-Turkish War (1806–1812). The Governorate was disbanded in 1917, with the establishment of Sfatul Țării, a national assembly which proclaimed the Moldavian Democratic Republic in December 1917. The latter united with Romania in April 1918.

Around 65% of the territory of the former governorate now belongs to the Republic of Moldova (including the breakaway region of Transnistria); around 35% belongs to Ukraine.

== History ==
=== Annexation ===
As the Russian Empire noticed the weakening of the Ottoman Empire, it occupied the eastern half of the autonomous Principality of Moldavia, between the Prut and Dniester rivers. This was followed by six years of warfare, which were concluded by the Treaty of Bucharest (1812), by which the Ottoman Empire acknowledged the Russian annexation of the province.

In 1829, according to the Treaty of Adrianople, Turkey ceded to Russia the Danube Delta, which also became part of the Bessarabia Oblast.

Before the Russian annexation, the territory had no particular name, Moldavia being traditionally divided into Ţara de Sus (the Upper Lands, the area of the Carpathian Mountains) and Ţara de Jos (the Lower Lands, the plains which included this territory). Bessarabia was the southern part of this territory (now known as Budjak); it is believed that the region was named after the Wallachian house of Basarab, which may have ruled it in the 14th century. The Russians used the name "Bessarabia" for the whole region rather than the southern area.

Bessarabia had an area of 45,630 km^{2} (17,620 sq mi), more than the rest of Moldavia and a population between 240,000 and 360,000, most of them being Romanians. The boyars of Bessarabia protested against the annexation, arguing that the Ottoman Empire had no right to cede a territory that was not theirs in the first place (Moldavia being only a vassal, not an Ottoman province), but this did not prevent the Sultan from signing the treaty in May 1812.

=== Oblast and governorate ===
After the annexation, the local boyars, led by Gavril Bănulescu-Bodoni, the Metropolitan of Chișinău and Hotin, petitioned for self-rule and the establishment of a civil government based on the Moldavian traditional laws. In 1818, a special autonomous region was created, which had both Romanian and Russian as languages used in the local administration. Bănulescu-Bodoni also obtained permission for opening a seminary and a printing press, with the Bessarabian church being an eparchy of the Russian Orthodox Church.

After the death of Bănulescu-Bodoni in 1821, Bessarabia lacked a strong leader and as the Russians feared nationalism, which triggered the anti-Ottoman 1821 Wallachian Revolution in neighbouring Wallachia, the local authorities began a gradual retraction of many of the freedoms.

Nicholas I of Russia, crowned in 1825, began a campaign of reforms which had the goal of gaining more control over the western provinces. Autonomy of the region was retracted in 1829, with the new constitution written by the governor of New Russia and Bessarabia, Mikhail Semyonovich Vorontsov. In 1834, Romanian was banned in schools and government facilities, and soon, books, the press, and churches despite 80% of the population being Romanian. Those who fought the changes could be exiled to Siberia. The constitution no longer made the usage of Romanian compulsory for public announcements and in 1854, Russian was made the official language. Also around 1850, Romanian was no longer used in schools and the importation of books from Moldavia and Wallachia was banned.

Integration within the Russian Empire continued with the introduction of the zemstva in 1869. Although this system was meant to increase the participation of the locals in civic affairs, it was run by Russians and other non-Moldavian functionaries brought from across the Empire.

The Moldavian boyars protested against the reforms, which decreased their own powers, but their protests were not well organized and they were mostly ignored. Some Moldavian boyar families were however integrated in the Russian nobility, but most of the nobles of Bessarabia were foreigners: in 1911, there were 468 noble families in Bessarabia, of which only 138 were Moldavian. In the beginning of the 20th century, the Jewish population made up to 40% of Chisinau.

Romania became independent in 1878, but millions of ethnic Romanians lived outside its borders and as such it had aspirations toward Transylvania, as well as Bessarabia.

=== Southern Bessarabia returned to Moldavia ===
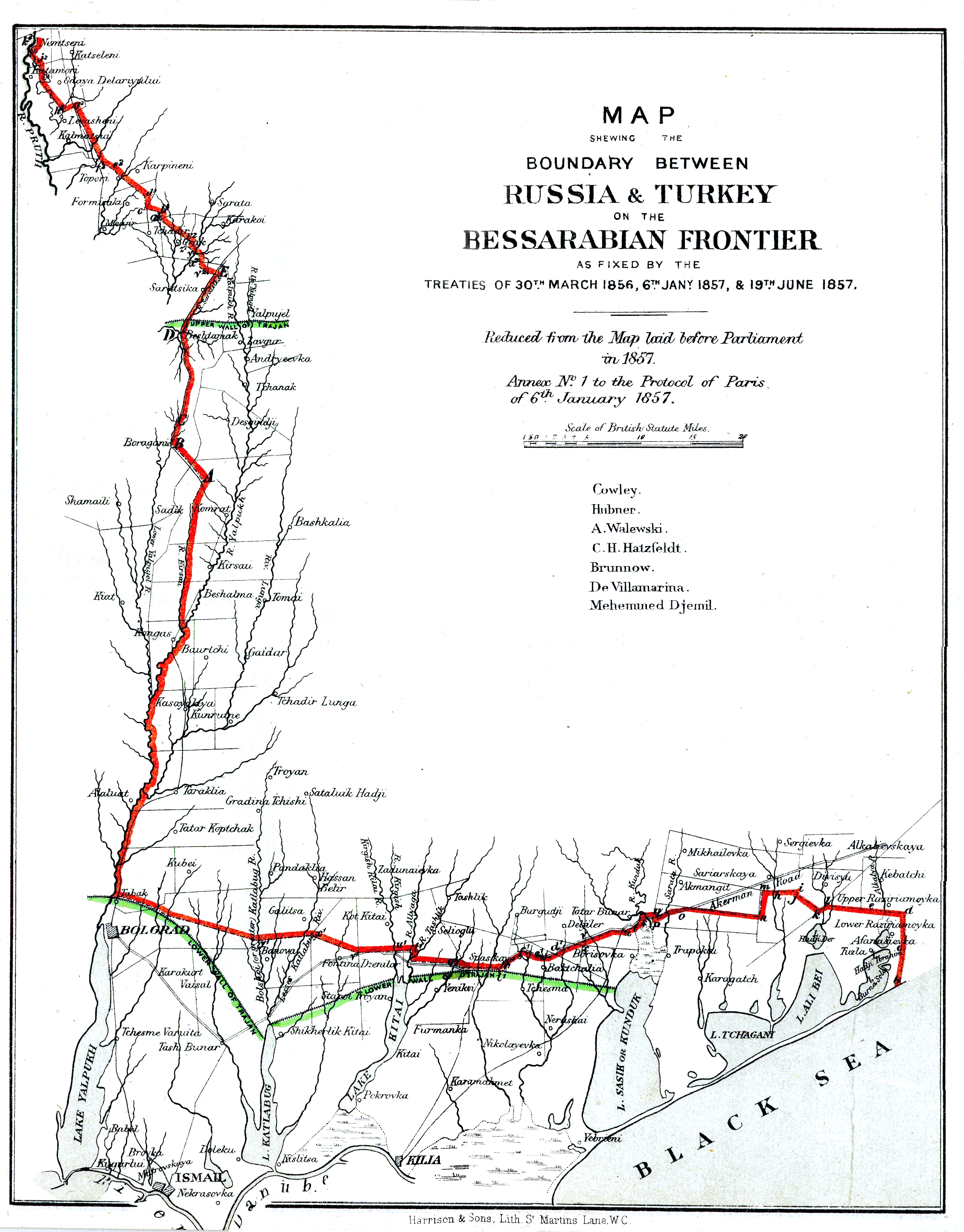
Map of the border between Moldavia/Romania and Russia, 1856-1878

In 1856, under the terms of the Treaty of Paris, Russia was forced to return a significant territory in Southern Bessarabia (organised as the Cahul and Ismail counties, with the Bolgrad later split from the second) to Moldavia, which joined Wallachia in 1859 to form Romania.

In 1877, the Russian Empire and Romania signed a treaty by the terms of which, Romania and Russia were allies against the Ottoman Empire, while Russia recognized Romania's independence and guaranteed its territorial integrity after the war. However, at the end of the Russo-Turkish War (1877–1878), Russia took southern Bessarabia, Alexander Gorchakov justifying this as a "matter of national honour" for Russia and arguing that the territory was ceded in 1856 to Moldavia, not to Romania and that the Russian guarantee of territorial integrity was directed against Turkish claims.

The Romanian politicians and public were angered by this action: Romanian politician Mihail Kogălniceanu accused Russia of deception and of treating an ally like a conquered province. He even started a memorandum against Russia to try to influence the Western governments, denouncing not only the annexation of Southern Bessarabia, but the 1812 annexation of Bessarabia as well. Despite this, none of the European powers wanted to risk a conflict with Russia.

According to the Treaty of Berlin (1878), Romania gained Dobruja as a compensation for the loss of Southern Bessarabia. Despite being a larger territory, Romanians considered it an unfair exchange and accepted it reluctantly, because there was no other alternative.

== Culture ==
As a consequence of Russification policy, Bessarabia was the most backward of the western provinces of the Russian Empire. In 1897, literacy was just 15.4% for the whole Bessarabia, with only 6% of ethnically Moldavians being literate, the main reason behind this being that Russian was the only language of instruction. As of 1920, an estimated ten percent of men and one percent of women were able to read and write.

Alexander II's reign brought a policy of establishing schools in every parish: 400 rural schools were founded in the 1860s in Bessarabia, but the Orthodox Church insisted everything be taught in Russian, whereas neither priests (who were teachers in most villages) nor pupils were speaking it. Thus, by the 1880s only 23 schools remained.

As a result, the literature and cultural life stagnated, only a few notable literary figures arising from Bessarabia, among them being Alexandru Hasdeu (1811–1872), Constantin Stamati (1786–1869) and Teodor Vârnav (1801–1860). In the second half of the 19th century, all links with Romanian literature were cut and no literary currents or schools of criticism developed in Bessarabia. In fact, in 1899, a visitor found no Romanian books in the Chişinău public library.

== Kishinev pogroms ==
The Kishinev pogrom was an anti-Jewish riot that took place in Kishinev, then the capital of the Bessarabia Governorate in the Russian Empire, on April 19 and 20, 1903. A further pogrom erupted in October 1905. In the first wave of violence, which was associated with Easter, 49 Jews were killed, large numbers of Jewish women were raped and 1,500 homes were damaged. American Jews began large-scale organized financial help, and assisted in emigration. The incident focused worldwide negative attention on the persecution of Jews in Russia.

== Politics ==
There was no Moldavian political party or movement in Bessarabia until 1905, when two major groups were founded. The moderates, led by landowner Pavel Dicescu, organized around the Societatea pentru Cultură Naţională ("The Society for National Culture"), argued for the usage of Romanian as a language of instruction in schools, but against social reforms. In 1909, they were successful in passing a resolution in the zemstvo of the gubernia related to the usage of Romanian in schools.

The radicals (national democrats), mostly students educated at Russian universities and influenced by socialist revolutionaries, wanted a real national awakening, as well as social justice. They founded a newspaper called Basarabia (first issue on 24 May 1906) led by Constantin Stere, which called for autonomy of Bessarabia and more rights to protect their language and culture, while making clear that they do not want secession from the Russian Empire.

Their movement had little success because in 1907, the extreme right won in the elections for the second Duma. In March 1907, the newspaper published Deşteaptă-te, române! ("Wake up, Romanian!"), a Romanian patriotic song, which made Kharuzin, the governor of Bessarabia, to order the closure of the newspaper only nine months after its first issue. Most of the contributors of the newspaper fled to Iaşi afterwards.

When the February Revolution happened in Petrograd in 1917, the governor of Bessarabia Governorate, Mihail Mihail Voronovici, stepped down on 13 March and passed his legal powers to Constantin Mimi, the President of the Gubernial Zemstvo, which was named the Comissar of the Provisional Government in Bessarabia, with Vladimir Criste his deputy. Similar procedures took place in all regions of the Empire: the chiefs of the Tsarist administrations passed their legal powers to the chiefs of the County and Governorate Zemstvos, which were then called County/Governorate Commissars.

== Demographics ==
According to Bessarabian historian Ștefan Ciobanu, at the beginning of the 19th century the ethnic Romanians (Moldavians) proportion was approximately 95% (1810), not including the territories formerly under direct Turkish administration (Budjak and Khotyn), which also purportedly had a Romanian majority. The Russian rule resulted in important changes in the ethnic structure of Bessarabia, especially due to the Russian policy of immigration from neighbouring provinces and Russification. The immigration was not uniform: in some districts in the northern and southern parts of Bessarabia (for instance Hotin and Akkerman), the immigration resulted in Ukrainians outnumbering Romanians, while the rural areas of the centre were mostly Romanian.

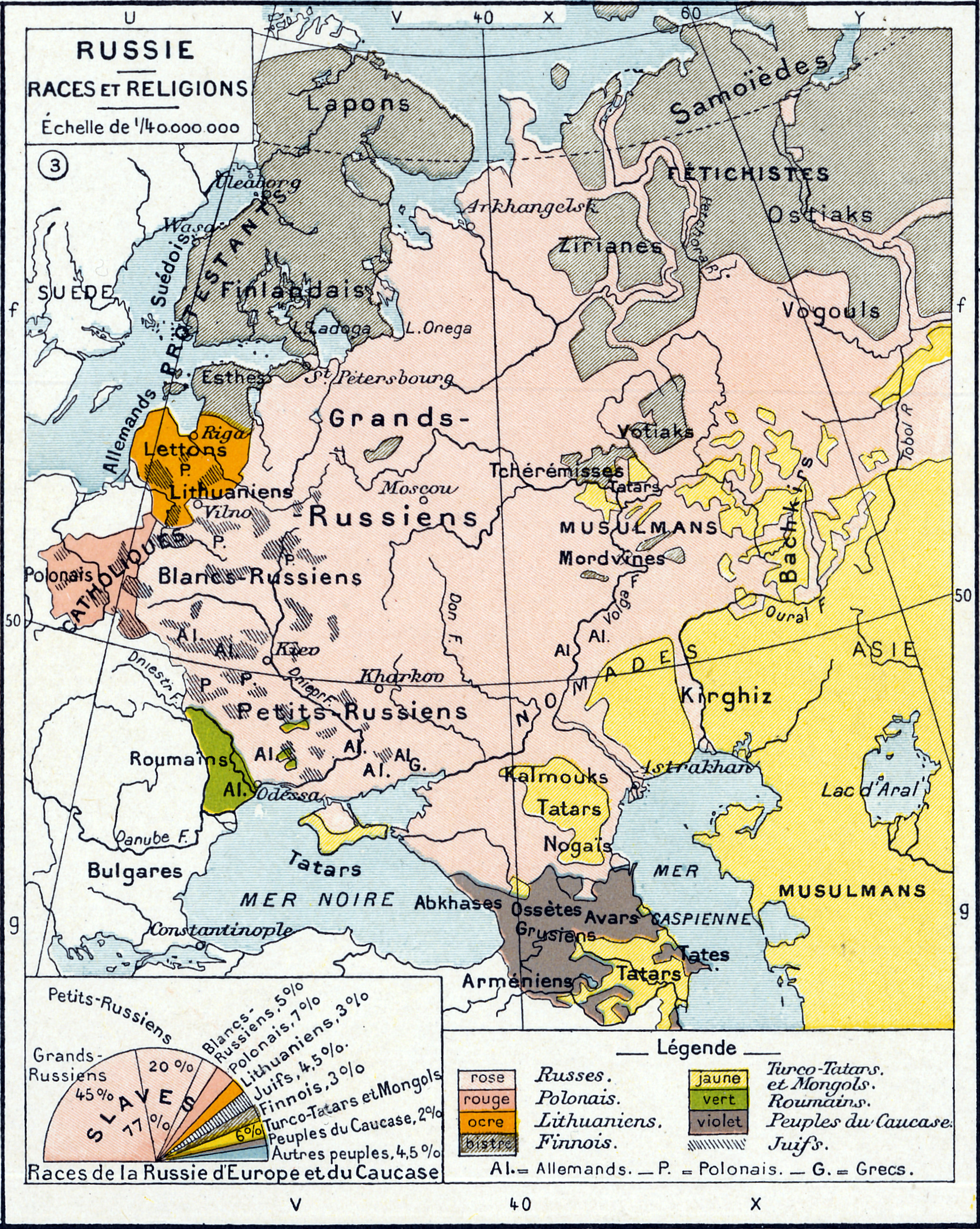
Ethnic groups in the European part of the Russian Empire before World War I.

Initially, the purpose of the colonization policy was unrelated to the ethnic makeup, being to increase the population of the rather sparsely populated area, in order to better exploit its resources. It was part of the larger campaign of colonization of Novorossiya, under which Russia appealed to everyone who wanted to work and live under its authority, no matter if they came from the Russian Empire or from elsewhere.

Census	Population	Romanians (Moldavians)	Ukrainians and Russians	Jews
1817	482,630	86% (est.)	6.5% (est.)	4.2% (est.)
1856	990,000	74%	12%	8%
1897	1,935,412	56%	18.9%	11.7%

Linguistic composition of the Bessarabia Governorate in 1897
Language	Native speakers	Percentage
Moldavian	920,919	47.6
Ukrainian	379,698	19.6
Jewish	228,168	11.8
Russian	155,774	8.0
Bulgarian	103,225	5.3
German	60,206	3.1
Turkish	55,790	2.9
Other languages	31,632	1.6
TOTAL	1,935,412	100.00

Most of the Moldavians of Bessarabia were free peasants, of which most being landless, leasing their land from landlords and monasteries, while 12% (in 1861) were răzeşi ("yeomen"). The Emancipation reform of 1861 had little effects in Bessarabia, where there were few serfs: just 12,000 most of which being brought from Russia for non-agricultural activities.

The urban population was quite low, amounting just 14.7% in 1912, most of the cities being just local administrative centres and having little industry. Also, few of the urban dwellers were Moldavians, in 1912, 37.2% being Jewish, 24.4% Russian, 15.8% Ukrainian, with just 14.2% Moldavian.

== Administrative divisions ==
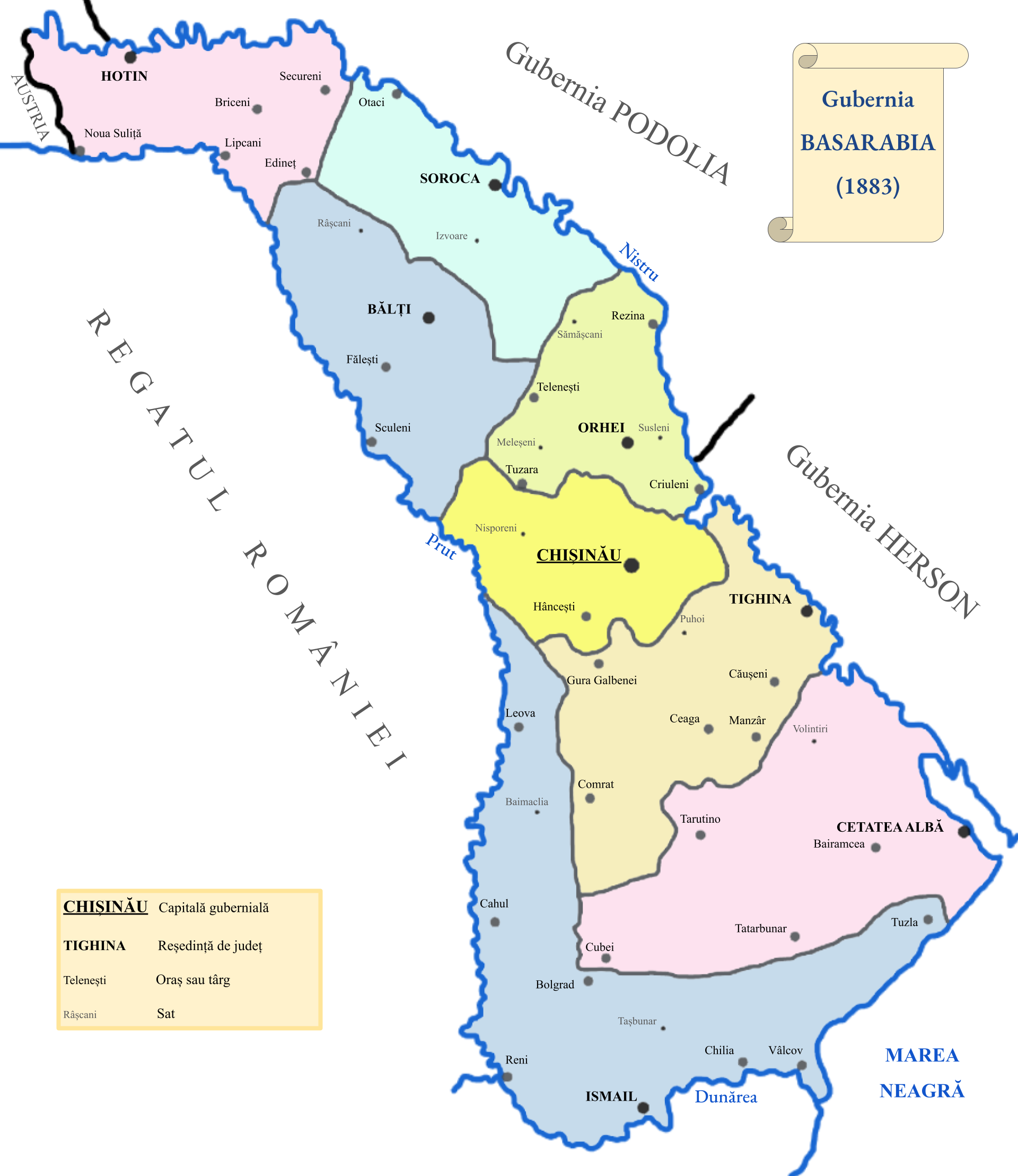
Bessarabia Governorate, 1883

From 1812 to 1818, there were 12 counties, which were then merged into 6, afterwards split into 9 counties (ținuturi): Hotin, Soroca, Iași, Orhei, Bender, Hotărniceni, Greceni, Codru, Reni (Ismail). The original terms for county were Romanian: ținut and județ (in Russian: tsynut, uyezd).

Two of the latter, Cahul County and Ismail County were returned to Moldavia in 1856. There they were known as Southern Bessarabia with three counties because a Bolgrad County was split out of Ismail County. When again annexed by the Russian Empire in 1878, these there were lumped together as one Ismail County, thus from 1878 till 1917, there were 8 counties.

County		Capital	Arms of capital	Area	Population (1897 census)	Note
Name in Romanian	Name in Russian	Capital	Arms of capital	Area	Population (1897 census)	Note
Akkerman	Аккерманскій	Akkerman		8,288 km^{2} (3,200 sq mi)	265,247	split from Bender in 1818
Bălți	Бѣлецкій	Bălți (Beltsy)		5,543.5 km^{2} (2,140.4 sq mi)	211,448	known as Iaşi County until 1887
Bender	Бендерскій	Bender (Bendery)		5,398.5 km^{2} (2,084.4 sq mi)	194,915	Codru County, merged into Bender in 1818; Hotărniceni County, merged into Codru in 1816
Chișinău	Кишиневскій	Chișinău (Kishinyov)		3,723 km^{2} (1,437 sq mi)	279,657	split from Orhei in 1836
Hotin	Хотинскій	Hotin (Khotin)		3,985.4 km^{2} (1,538.8 sq mi)	307,532	
Ismail	Измаильскій	Ismail (Izmail)		9,250.2 km^{2} (3,571.5 sq mi)	244,274	known as Tomarovo County until 1816, Leova County between 1830 and 1836, and Cahul County between 1836 and 1856. Between 1830 and 1857 the city of Ismail was put under a separate administration that included the nearby villages owned by the state. In 1856 most of the county became part of Moldavia, while the remaining part constituted the Comrat County, split between neighbouring counties in 1858. The Ismail County re-emerged when the territory returned to Russian rule in 1878.: Greceni County, merged into Ismail in 1818
Orhei	Оргѣевскій	Orhei (Orgeyev)		4,133.4 km^{2} (1,595.9 sq mi)	213,478	
Soroca	Сорокскій	Soroca (Soroki)		4,564.2 km^{2} (1,762.2 sq mi)	218,861	merged into Iaşi in 1818, split again in 1836

== Church ==
Split from the Metropolis of Moldavia, the orthodox church in Bessarabia became an eparchy of the Russian Orthodox Church, and after Bănulescu-Bodoni's death, it became an agent in the state policy of Russification.

All the archbishops after 1821 tried to bring the eparchy in conformity with the regulations of the Russian Orthodox Church and because of that, all the high-ranked clerics were brought from Russia, because they were more familiar with the rules of the Russian church.

Archbishop Irinarh Popov (1844–1858) tried to promote Russian nationalism and loyalty to the tsar and brought clerics from Russia. Archbishop Pavel Lebedev forced Moldavian churches and monasteries to use Russian during the religious service, making knowledge of Russian compulsory for becoming a priest, but despite his attempts, by the end of his rule (1882), there were still 417 churches which used only Romanian in the liturgy.

Following the 1905 Russian Revolution, the church decided to allow the usage of Romanian by the village priests and the re-establishment of the eparchy printing press, which would publish religious literature and of a newspaper.

== See also ==
- Comrat Republic
- Bessarabia Governorate (Romania)
- Bessarabian question
