= Romanian military intervention in Bessarabia =

1918 invasion and annexation of Bessarabia by the Kingdom of Romania

- Part of the Allied intervention in the Russian Civil War and World War I
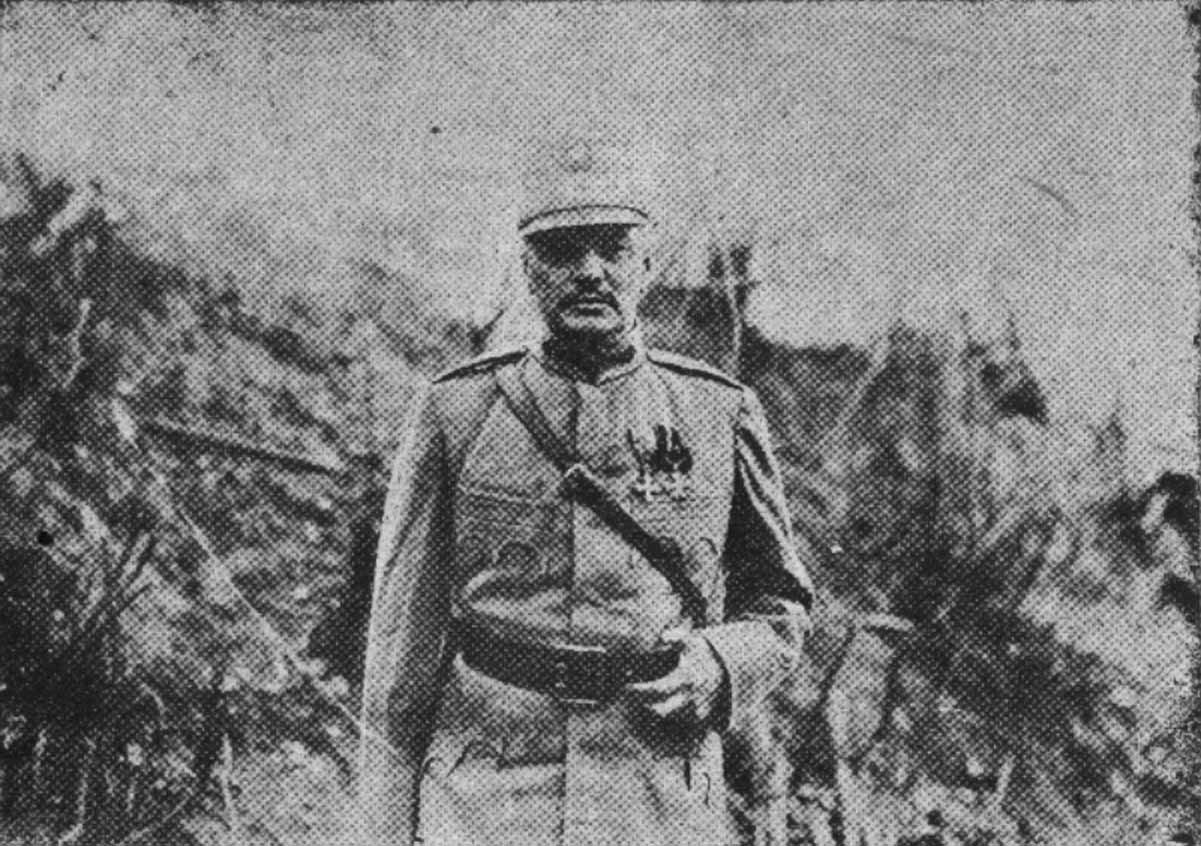
- Romanian general Ernest Broșteanu in Bessarabia during 1918
Date	19 January – 8 March 1918
Location	Bessarabia
Result	Romanian victory: Removal of the Bolsheviks and restoration of the Moldavian Democratic Republic; Moldavian Assembly declares independence and two months later proclaims union with Romania
Territorial changes	Romanian occupation of central and southern Bessarabia; Austro-Hungarian occupation of northern Bessarabia

Belligerents
Kingdom of Romania; Volunteer Corps of Transylvanians-Bukovinians; Moldavian Democratic Republic (anti-Bolshevik factions); Russian Republic; Ukrainian People's Republic Diplomatic support: (French Third Republic) France; United Kingdom German Empire; Austria-Hungary	Rumcherod (19–30 January); Moldavian Democratic Republic (pro-Bolshevik factions) (19 Jan.–early Feb.); Odessa SR (30 January–8 March); Romanian Revolutionary Military Committee (Feb.) (Russia) (Ukraine) Odessa Committee for the Salvation of Bessarabia

Commanders and leaders
(Kingdom of Romania) Ernest Broșteanu (Russian Republic) Dmitry Shcherbachev	Evgeny Venediktov; Filipp Levenson; Grigory Kotovsky (Moldavian Democratic Republic) Anatol Popa; Grigore Borisov; Anatoli Zhelezniakov; Mikhail Muravyov; Petr Lazarev (Moldavian Democratic Republic) Vasile Rudiev †; Ivan Krivorukov (Russia) (Ukraine) Alexander Schmidt

Strength
800–1,000 Transylvanian volunteers c. 50,000 Romanian regular troops Danube Flotilla	c. 6,000 in Chișinău over 1,000 in Bălți c. 1,000 in Vâlcov c. 2,000 in Akkerman; 3 infantry regiments 1 infantry battalion 2 hussar regiments 2 cavalry regiments 2 cavalry squadrons 1 railroad battalion 1 artillery brigade 1 machine-gun company 1 automobile company several Red Guards detachments 500 Romanian volunteers several military vessels

Casualties and losses
c. 150 killed c. 2,100 captured 2 floating batteries captured	>1,500–2,000 killed

The Romanian military intervention in Bessarabia took place between 19 January and 8 March (Old Style [O.S.] 5 January – 23 February) 1918, as part of the broader Allied intervention in the Russian Civil War. It pitted the Kingdom of Romania, Russian Republic, Ukrainian People's Republic and anti-Bolshevik factions of the Moldavian Democratic Republic on one side, against the Bolshevik controlled Rumcherod and Odessa Soviet Republic, as well as pro-Bolshevik factions within the Moldavian DR. The intervention began when the Romanian army and its allies crossed into Bessarabia and launched an attack on Chișinău and Ungheni, capturing the latter.

On 19 January, the Bolshevik Frontotdel took hold of Chișinău, only to lose it to a second Romanian offensive on 26 January. On 29 January, Romanian troops besieged Bender; after much bitter fighting the defenders retreated from the city on 2 February. In northern Bessarabia, Romanian troops seized Bălți on 5 February. On 14 February, Vladimir Lenin appointed Mikhail Muravyov as the commander of the Bessarabia and Transnistria Front, reinforcing it with 3,000 soldiers. Muravyov went on a counter-offensive, achieving a number of victories, however his gains were erased when the Central Powers launched a large scale offensive against the Bolsheviks. In the south, Bolshevik sailors continued to control parts of the Budjak until early March, before retreating to Odessa.

Romania used the opportunity to break armistice negotiations with the Bolsheviks and occupy the last Bessarabian territories not under its control. On 6 February, Sfatul Țării, the Moldavian Democratic Republic's parliament, declared the country's independence. On 9 April 1918, the Moldavian Democratic Republic united with Romania.

== Background ==
In 1812, as a result of the Treaty of Bucharest that followed the Russo-Turkish War of 1806-1812, and in spite of all protests, Moldavia lost to the Russian Empire its eastern part, between Prut and Dniester rivers. Becoming known as Bessarabia, the territory annexed by Russia and was then gradually colonized and Russianized. Education in the Romanian language was forbidden, and its use in the administration was also banned, while the Orthodox church in Bessarabia, detached from the Metropolitan Church of Moldavia and passed under the jurisdiction of the Russian Orthodox Church, also became an instrument of the Russification policy. Following the union of Moldavia with Wallachia in 1859, and the establishment of the independent Kingdom of Romania in 1881, the foreign policy of the new state became strongly influenced by the ideas of the Romanian National Awakening, aiming at creating a Greater Romania which would incorporate all Romanian speakers, including the inhabitants of Bessarabia.

During World War I, in 1916–1917, Romania and Russia fought as allies, and during the winter of 1916/1917 the Russian command directed the 35th Infantry and 15th Cavalry divisions to the Romanian front in order to forestall the country's complete occupation. The southern part of Romania (72% of its territory) had already been occupied by the Central Powers, with the capital itself, Bucharest, having fallen on 4 December 1916. Romanian and Russian troops successfully defended against the German offensive, and the front was stabilized by mid-August 1917. In the meantime, news of the February Revolution which overthrew the Russian Tsar had reached Bessarabia. The first local soviet was created in Bender/Tighina on 21 March 1917, and by May 1917 soviets had been created in all district of Bessarabia. Concurrently, during the spring of 1917 peasants began dividing the land among themselves. The National Moldavian Party (NMP) was also created during the second part of March 1917, attracting primarily landowners. Gaining the support of the Romanian government, the party agitated for the introduction of Moldovan language in state institutions, solving the agrarian problem only in the interest of Moldavians, and gradually promoted a union with Romania. Though national polarization had emerged among the soldiers of the Russian army, the NMP failed to impose its goals on the various organizations emerging in the context of the revolutions: the April Provincial Congress of Public Teachers decided that both Moldavian and Russian should be used in education, while the First Provincial Peasants' Congress (3-5 June 1917) decided to transfer all land in public ownership, demanded equal treatment for all national groups, and decided for autonomy within Russia. Describing the situation, NMP politicians Grigore Cazacliu and Ion Văluță stated "the Moldavian people consider us their enemies". The party failed to gain popularity among the Bessarabians who voted in November 1917, in the Bessarabia electoral district, for the Russian Constituent Assembly elections, and received only 2.3 percent of the vote. However, after the Romanian intervention, three of the five deputies representing the Soviet of Deputies of the Peasants, led by Ion Inculet and Pantelimon Erhan, and also including Teodor Cojocaru, elected to the All-Russian Constituent Assembly, which obtained 36.7% of the votes in the November 1917 elections in the Bessarabia Electoral District, out of the 13 elected from the province, eventually supported Bessarabia's union with Romania on 27 March/9 April 1918. It has been suggested that their opposition against the Bolshevik takeover before the Romanian intervention had a particularly important role in making Inculet, Erhan and Cojocaru support Bessarabia's independence and subsequent union with Romania after the Romanian intervention. Cojocaru's support for the union of Bessarabia with Romania at the time of the union has been noted. On 22 December 1917, both Inculet and Erhan asked for a Romanian military intervention in Bessarabia. The daily journal of the Romanian prime minister Alexandru Averescu of 28 February 1918, indicates that Inculet had proposed to Averescu the union of Bessarabia with Romania, and that the latter had refused this option because of his desire to retain Dobrogea as a part of Romania, which would have been impossible in the case of the union of Bessarabia with Romania; this seems to have been the first time when the president of the Moldovan Democratic Republic indicated his preference for such a step. On 25 June 1918, Inculet claimed in a speech in Sfatul Tarii that he had supported the union of Bessarabia with Romania on 24 January 1918, when Bessarabia declared its independence; the latter Romanian parliamentarian minister of the interior and deputy prime minister of Romania (Inculet) later claimed that he had supported such a move when he had requested the Romanian military intervention in Bessarabia, a staple of his electioneering techniques in interwar Romania.

Besides the marauding and violence by deserters, usual in regions near the front line such as Bessarabia, the February Revolution further eroded discipline among Russian soldiers, resulting in a surge in the number of deserters; instances of brigandage and looting multiplied. In August 1917, after the July Days, the newly created Central Moldovan Military Executive Committee in Chișinău, supported by the Chișinău City Soviet, decided to establish ten Moldavian national units of 40 people each; these were initially called Cohorts, then mobile detachments. The Cohorts' main mission was to maintain order against domestic anarchy, but they were unable to do that in the context of social turmoil and rebellion among the Russian soldiers. Mikhail Meltyukhov claims that the units also intervened to prevent the peasants from dividing the lands of the large estates and helped restore the property of large landowners. Simultaneously, the internal situation in Russia also led to emergence of Bolshevik groups among the Russian soldiers: distinct organizations were created in Bessarabia and the Romanian Front during August and September. The Bolshevik influence came to manifest itself even among certain Moldavian detachments, prompting Ștefan Ciobanu to later declare that "it is precisely those few Moldavian units that were at the disposal of Sfatul Țării that were infected with Bolshevism". The peasants also radicalized, the Second Provincial Peasants' Congress (9–13 September 1917) calling for the transfer of all land, water, forests and resources to the public domain, mirroring the Bolshevik slogan "All land to peasants!". Beginning with 7 October, the Central Moldovan Military Executive Committee decided to create units under its sole command, and was supported with soldiers and officers by the Russian command of the Romanian Front and the Odessa Military District. The committee also convened a Moldavian Military Congress, gathering around 600 delegates, mainly officers; on 3 November the Congress decided on the creation of a provincial assembly, Sfatul Țării, which would uphold Bessarabian autonomy.

According to Ion Giurcă, the overthrow of the Russian Provisional Government in Petrograd in October 1917 (also known as the October Revolution) and the seizure of power in Russia by the Bolsheviks led to disorganization and indiscipline in the Russian Army on the Eastern Front. On 5 December [O.S. 22 November] 1917, Soviet Russia signed in Brest-Litovsk a complete ceasefire with the Central Powers, calling for a peace without annexations and indemnities, and ordering its troops to stop fighting in view of an armistice with the Central Powers. Dmitry Shcherbachev, the head of the Russian troops on the Romanian Front, refused to comply with the Soviet Government's orders. Under these conditions, two opposing groups emerged in the local Russian armies: one that recognized the new Bolshevik leadership in Petrograd, determined to leave the front, and a second group under the command of general Shcherbachev, which sought to continue the war; disputes and armed confrontations soon erupted between the two groups. Despite Romanian military support, Shcherbachev, who according to van Meurs had become a "commander without an army", failed to subdue the local Bolshevik committee and ultimately agreed to sign an armistice with the Germans. Consequently, Romania and Russians under Shcherbachev signed an armistice in Focșani on 9 December [O.S. 26 November] 1917, six days before the armistice between Russia and the Central Powers.

Following the Bolshevik Declaration of the Rights of the Peoples of Russia, on 15 December [O.S. 2 December] 1917, Bessarabia proclaimed its autonomy within the Russian Republic, as the Moldavian Democratic Republic. The leaders of the newly created state were Ion Inculeț, the president of Sfatul Țării, the Moldavian legislative council, and Pantelimon Erhan, the chief of the Moldavian government (called the Council of General Directors). The local leaders argued that Bessarabia should remain firmly within the new Russia, but with its status "like that of Finland in the tsarist empire or one of the cantons of Switzerland". Due to violence and the chaotic situation in the region, as well as the prevalence of illiteracy among the Bessarabian peasant masses, no general election took place and the seats in Sfatul Țării were distributed to various social groups, minorities, professional organizations, and interest groups. The delegates represented only four of the governorate's uyezds, which were primarily populated by ethnic Moldovans. In the Budjak where the majority of the population was non-Moldovan, Sfatul Țării's authority received limited recognition. The assembly and the Council of Directors were expected to administer the province until the Bessarabian Constituent Assembly could meet to decide the future of the province.

In the meantime, various soviets had emerged around Bessarabia, many of them controlled by Mensheviks, Esers, and Bundists, and initially without Bolshevik influences. The soviets and Sfatul Țării recognized each other, and the Esers and Peasant's Soviet had received seats in the assembly. Both the Petrograd Soviet and the Council of People's Commissars recognized the new Moldavian Republic, its Assembly and government. Conversely, several of local soviets also recognized Vladimir Lenin's government, and until mid-December the local soviets became "Bolshevized".

Mikhail Meltyukhov claims that, on 21 November, the Romanian ambassador in London indicated to the British leadership that the Romanian army was ready to participate in the struggle against the Soviets, and two days later the US president promised support for Romanian territorial claims in exchange for participation in an anti-Soviet intervention. Shcherbachev also agreed to transfer to Romania Russian weapons, ammunition and food supplies in exchange of 16 million rubles; part of these resources were to be transferred to General Alexey Kaledin, recognized by the Entente as the legitimate Russian representative.

While retreating from Romanian territory, groups of Russian soldiers and even whole units also started committing various acts of violence and robberies, resulting in a series of confrontations with the Romanian army in Socola, Galați, Pașcani, Spătăreşti and Mihăileni. However, according to Tutula, the main cause that led to Romanian actions against Russian soldiers was the chaotic state of the Russian army and the increased danger represented by the concentration of Bolshevik troops in Iași and its surroundings. According to Tutula, these troops aimed at suppressing Shcherbachev, dethroning King Ferdinand I and establishing a communist regime in Romania; such arguments determined the Romanian Government to adopt, on the night of 21 December [O.S. 8 December] to 22 December [O.S. 9 December] 1917, "exceptional measures". The Romanian army was ordered to allow only authorized travel for the Russian columns heading for the Prut, and to disarm all Russian troops in disorder.

Mikhail Meltyukhov notes that Romanian intervention was requested by Shcherbachev after the Bolsheviks under Semyon Roshal, with the support of the Socola garrison, announced they had seized power on the Romanian Front on 16 December. After failed negotiations in Iași, Ukrainian troops and four Romanian regiments arrested the Bolshevik negotiation team on 21 December, shot Roshal, dissolved the revolutionary committee and disarmed troops loyal to it. Dorin Dobrincu points out that, arriving from Petrograd with the mission to take control of the Revolutionary Military Committee of the Romanian Front, Roshal tried, with the help of some Bolshevik soldiers, to arrest General Shcherbachev; the general was saved by his Ukrainian guards and the intervention of the French and Romanian officers. According to Dobrincu, after being detained by the Romanians, Roshal ended up in "unclear conditions" in the hands of the anti-Bolshevik Russians; his body was later found near a railway line, possibly after being shot by "his Russian political and ideological opponents". The following days, the Romanians disarmed all Russian troops deemed "unreliable", and, according to Meltyukhov, severed Russian access to food depots and interned Russian servicemen in concentration camps. On the morning of 22 December [O.S. 9 December] 1917, the Romanian troops, with the help of Ukrainian soldiers loyal to General Shcherbachev, surrounded the Russian garrison at Socola and disarmed it. According to Dobrincu, no casualties were reported in this incident, and all 3,000 Russian soldiers were put on trains and sent across the Prut. Romanian troops in other settlements across Moldavia followed suit, however in several places their actions led to armed confrontation. According to Mitrasca, the Russian troops fleeing from Romanians passed through Bessarabia, robbing and pillaging. Meltyukhov however claims that, in order to justify its actions, the Romanian government propaganda began alleging that Russian troops had been perpetrating robberies and pogroms.

The actions of the Romanian troops "for the enthronement of the order" in the Romanian territory were categorized by the Soviet Government as "criminal", being followed by ultimatum notes which, according to Vasile Tutula, had the character of a declaration of war. The Commissar of Foreign Affairs, Leon Trotsky, reproached the Romanian representative in Petrograd, Constantin Diamandy, for interfering in Russia's internal affairs, while Diamandy replied Romanian actions were police measures against devastation by the Russian troops.

== Prelude ==
The first Romanian forays in Bessarabia began in mid December (on 14 December [O.S. 1 December] 1917 according to some sources) when a small detachment took over the village of Leova, purportedly in order to protect the grain stores. This caused indignation among locals, which believed the troops came "to take away the gains of the revolution". Following a rally organized by the local soviet, the Romanian troops were repulsed, losing one officer (captain Popilian) and two soldiers. A member of the Cahul supply commission informed the Sfatul Țării that Romanian troops had intervened after he had requested to Shcherbachev a military guard for the local depots, however the Romanians were attacked by local armed bands. On 21 December the Romanians sent a two-regiment strong retaliatory expedition, occupied Leova, and, under treat of shooting every tenth local, demanded that the leaders of the local Soviet be surrendered. All four members of the soviet's executive committee, headed by I. Nestrat, were summarily tried and consequently shot, as they were deemed responsible for the earlier Romanian casualties.

Further forays took place throughout December: on the 20th Romanian troops surrounded Pogănești, Sărata-Răzeși and Voinescu and began shooting the locals, prompting Chițan, president of the Mingir committee, to telegraph Chișinău to ask for urgent military assistance; similar Romanian actions took place two days later in Cărpineni and surrounding villages. On 23 December 1917, Britain and France signed a secret agreement delineating their spheres of influences within the Russian Empire. Bessarabia and other Russian territories north of the Black Sea coast fell within the French ambit. Determined to combat the Central Powers and Russian forces hostile to its interests, the head of the French military mission in Iași, General Henri Mathias Berthelot, began pressuring Romania to occupy Bessarabia.

The state of insecurity in Bessarabia, determined by robberies and riots committed by retreating Russian troops, as well as Bolshevik claims to power over the region, determined some of the Moldavian leaders to ask for help from the Romanian state, however not for a Romanian occupation, as it happened later. On 26 December, the Bolsheviks took control of the Bessarabian railways, the Moldavian troops refusing to take actions against them in spite of the decision of Sfatul Țării. At the latter's request, Shcherbachev ordered parts of the 7th Cavalry and 61st Infantry divisions to head towards Bessarabia, however, his troops also refused to comply. In the meantime, the peasant faction of Sfatul Țării decided to send 3 representative to Petrograd to request support against a possible Romanian intervention. On 27–28 December [O.S. 14–15 December] 1917, Vladimir Cristi and Ion Pelivan, members of the Moldavian legislative council Sfatul Țării and of the government, paid a visit to Iași, to present the situation from Bessarabia to the Romanian government. Following the discussions, on 4 January 1918 [O.S. 22 December 1917], Sfatul Țării decided to grant powers to the Moldavian government, respectively to request military aid from the Allied Powers. On the same day, Erhan, Pelivan, and Cristi sent a secret telegram to the Romanian Minister of War requesting the urgent sending to Chișinău of a Transylvanian regiment (made up of former Austro-Hungarian prisoners of Romanian ethnicity) located in Kiev. Another request came from the Moldavian Committee in Kiev, which, following information received from the representative of Sfatul Țării on the critical situation in Bessarabia, also requested the Romanian government in Iași to send Romanian troops to Bessarabia, immediately. Still on 4 January, the Soviet government in Petrograd ordered Russian troops to retreat from Romanian territory towards Bessarabia, opposing with force any Romanian attempt to stop them, while the Council of Directors addressed the French military attaché in Chișinău, requesting instructors for its troops.

The socialist bloc and the block of national minorities in Sfatul Țării were categorically against the arrival of the Romanian troops, indicating that this could be the first step to the military occupation of the region, posing a threat to all the political and social gains of the revolution. In response to the rumours of a Romanian intervention, several organizations across Bessarabia issued protests, including the Briceni soviet of workers' and soldiers' deputies, the fourth Congress of peasants' deputies in Hotin district, the second Congress of peasants' deputies in Bălți district, the meeting of the Bessarabian delegates to the second Congress of the Rumcherod, the Central Military Commissariat of Internal Affairs, the soldiers of the 1st Moldavian Regiment, the 129th Moldavian air battery and the detachment of Bessarabian sailors in Sevastopol. The limited Romanian armed intervention in Leova in early December, as well as the actions taken to disarm retreating Bolshevik troops in Romanian territory prompted strong protests by the Soviet Government. Romania's failure to reply to the protests ultimately led Lenin to arrest the Romanian representative in Petrograd and confiscate the Romanian Treasure on 13 January 1918. The Romanian diplomat was released the following day at the request of the other embassies in Petrograd, with the Soviet government reiterating its request that arrested Russian soldiers be freed and allowed to retreat.

By the end of December, Bolsheviks took the upper hand in most local soviets and on 6 January 1918, in preparation for repelling an impending intervention, they created a unified command in Chișinău, the Revolutionary Military Committee for Bessarabia, headed by Yevgeny Venediktov and using both troops from the reserve regiments and units retreating from the Romanian front. Even before this move, the Chișinău city soviet began criticizing the activity of Sfatul Țării, and several days later, the executive committee of the Bessarabian peasants' soviets, the Chișinău city soviet and the Central Committee of the Moldavian Officers and Soldiers called on a meeting in order to provide a better, democratic composition of the Bessarabian assembly. This was ultimately cancelled after the Bessarabian Bolshevik delegates to the second congress of the Rumcherod, taking place in Odessa between 23 December 1917 and 4 January 1918, adopted a strong condemnation of the Sfatul Țării and decided to send to Chișinău the Rumcherod's Front Section (Frontotdel) to take over the region. According to Vasile Vasilos, the ultimate goal of the Bolsheviks was to establish the Soviet power in Bessarabia and maintain it as part of Russia.

On the night of 13 January 1918 [O.S. 31 December 1917], the strategic points and buildings in Chișinău were captured by the Bolsheviks, and the Frontotdel proclaimed itself the supreme power in Bessarabia, however, according to Meltyukhov, Sfatul Țării was not dispersed. The Frontotdel order all authorities to strictly follow only its orders, and not those of the Central Council of Ukraine, General Shcherbachev or other self-proclaimed bodies. Furthermore, it ordered all military structures of the Romanian Front to leave Romanian territory and relocate to Chișinău and directed the military committees to rebuild an army to defend Bessarabia. The Frontotdel also requested that the Petrograd government directed the Moldavian Council of Directors to refuse any Romanian military intervention. On 16 January 1918 [O.S. 3 January 1918], the pro-Russian socialist deputies withdrew from Sfatul Țării and issued a statement calling for the union with the Russian Bolshevik revolution and against the arrival of the Romanian army in Bessarabia, claiming that "there were too many Moldovans and bourgeois elements in Sfatul Țării". On 18 January [O.S. 5 January], the Frontotdel along with the local Bolshevik organization began the removal of other Moldavian state structures. According to Marcel Mitrasca the Bolsheviks abolished Sfatul Țării and replaced it with a self-proclaimed Moldavian Soviet (even though Marcel Mitrasca claims there were no ethnic Moldovans in its composition).

In these conditions, Cristi, Pelivan and Erhan went to Iași to request once again the entry of the Romanian army in Bessarabia to fight the Bolshevik challenges to the power of Sfatul Țării. As a result of the critical situation in which Sfatul Țării and the Moldavian government were, on the pretext of securing supply lines against raids by Bolsheviks and armed bandits, the Romanian government agreed to send the army to Bessarabia, the measure being supported by the representatives of the Entente (French and British missions in Iași), but also by the Russian general Shcherbachev, the nominal commander of the Russian army on the Romanian front. Van Meurs claims that a significant part of the Bessarabian public opinion strongly resented Romanian intervention and feared that the promised reforms would be overturned. Bolshevik propaganda played on such fears, claiming the Moldavian Bloc in Sfatul Țării had sold Bessarabia to Romania and was planning to renounce the agrarian reform. Gherman Pântea, the director responsible for the military in Sfatul Țării's government, reported that "the Moldavian population, and especially the Moldavian soldiers, were excited and angry that the Romanians would come to take from them land obtained as a result of the revolution, and the freedoms won after a century of suffering".

Octavian Țîcu considers that, first of all, not the attitudes, favourable or not to the entry of Romanian troops in Bessarabia, but the disintegration of the Russian Empire, local anarchy and the absolute need of the Western allies to maintain the Romanian-Russian front, to ensure its supply, communications and withdrawal, were the main factors that determined general Shcherbachev to ask the Romanian government to send the Romanian army to Bessarabia, amid the lack of organization of the Russian army.

== Operations ==
=== Initial attacks ===
Map of the Moldavian Democratic Republic

On 6 January, the Romanian government, in agreement with the Ukrainian authorities, ordered Transylvanian troops to advance from Kiev to Chișinău, in coordination with an attack on the border town of Ungheni, which had a Bolshevik garrison. Upon their arrival in Chișinău railway station on 19 January at around 1 AM, the 800 to 1,000 Transylvanians were met by 1st Moldavian Infantry Regiment, the 5th Zaamursky Cavalry Regiment and a Red Guards detachment raised by the Frontotdel. After the Transylvanians refused to disarm, a skirmish broke out and they were ultimately disarmed and arrested, losing five or six killed and many wounded, and afterwards sent back to Kiev. Attempts by Erhan and Inculeț to convince the Moldavian troops to release the Transylvanians, claiming they were only in transit, failed after the captured soldiers declared they had been sent to take over Romanian depots and liquidate the Bolsheviks. However, according to Vasile Tutula, after the Transylvanian soldiers were arrested, beaten, and in torn uniforms, mocked and spit on the streets of the city, some of them were then forcibly released by the Moldavian troops, who sheltered them in their barracks, while according to Dorin Dobrincu, the Transylvanians were released after a few days, in the context of the entry of Romanian troops in Bessarabia.

In the meantime, the Romanian command decided on 17 January to send further troops towards Bessarabia, several units crossing the Prut on the 18th and the 19th. The attack on Ungheni began at dawn on 18 January involved, besides Romanian troops, Russian troops still loyal to Shcherbachev and Ukrainian nationalist units. The combined troops were able to defeat the Soviets and capture the town, executing the twelve members of the local soviet of soldiers' deputies. By the evening of the following day Romanian troops had reached Strășeni and attempted to make their way to Chișinău through Ghidighici, however, they were met by strong Soviet fire at Ghidighici and Cojușna. By the night of the 20th, the interventionists retreated in disarray towards Strășeni, abandoning their weapons and surrendering in small groups as they were pursued by Frontotdel's cavalry units. Met with hostility by local villagers, a detachment of over one thousand Romanians was surrounded and surrendered at Strășeni. The Romanian troops and Russian detachments led by general Nekrasov, Shcherbachev's representative, retreated toward Ungheni and attempted to regroup at Cornești during 20 January, only to be surrounded by a revolutionary railway battalion. Some of the invading troops surrender, while the rest managed to break out and retreat to Romania; general Nekrasov barely escaped lynching by his soldiers and was ultimately killed by locals. On 21 January, the detachment of the 2nd railway district repairing the line from Chișinău to Strășeni came upon a group of Romanian troops, capturing 40 soldiers, with the others escaping to Ungheni.

Around the same time, the Romanian army along with Russian troops loyal to Shcherbachev attempted to create a bridgehead in the south of Bessarabia, occupying Cahul, Vadul lui Isac and Manta. Attempting to enter Bolhrad, they were met by the troops of the Military Revolutionary Committee of the 6th Army along with Moldavian detachments. On the night of 22/23 January the defenders managed to disarm the Romanians after a short battle and proceeded to clear the Romanian troops in Bolhrad, Cahul, Leova and Vulcănești. The garrison and locals in Reni also managed to repulse an attack from across the border, while Russian generals Kotzebue, Dedyushin and Ivanov were arrested as collaborators of the invaders.

=== Soviet takeover in Chișinău ===
In the meantime, Ion Giurcă claims the Bolsheviks attacked the headquarters of the Inter-Allied Commission, arresting the military and officials of the Entente states, as well as several deputies of Sfatul Țării. Ion Giurcă states that Erhan and Inculeț were among the arrested, while Vladimir Polivțev notes the two Moldavian leaders were actually invited to an emergency joint meeting of the Bessarabian Provincial and Chișinău City Executive Committees of the Soviets of Workers 'and Soldiers' Deputies, the Peasant Provincial Executive Committee and the Moldavian Central Military Executive Committee, which had assembled on 19 January to declare state of war. Erhan and Inculeț declared during the meeting they did not know anything about the entry of Romanian troops and would dismiss any directors that may have had anything to do with it. Depending on the account, they were either forced to write and send to the Romanian government a telegram protesting against the entry of the Romanian armies and demanding an end to its sending to Bessarabia, or voluntary did it to disperse suspicions against them. It is unclear whether the Frontotdel takeover was precipitated by the Romanian attack or was a result of it having gained the allegiance of most local soviets in Bessarabia the previous day. Erhan and Inculeț were also forced to order the Moldavian regiments to oppose the advance of Romanian troops; Pan Halippa claimed that Gherman Pântea had actually signed the order, which Inculeț and Erhan knew about, but the order did not reach the Moldavian troops, being used only as a "justification" to the Bolshevik leaders, who were in control of Chișinău. Wim van Meurs further notes that it is unclear whether Erhan and Inculeț were forced by the Bolsheviks to order resistance to the Romanian advance or they genuinely loathed the arrival of the Romanian "liberators". The Moldavian leaders did not have a unitary perspective on the future of Bessarabia: while Halippa and Pelivan were seeking a union with Romania, Erhan and Inculeț were left-wing politicians who sought a Moldavian Republic, either independent or as part of a Russian Federation. Inculeț in particular, as president of the Sfatul Țării, did not take part in any of the mission to the Romanian government and was later prevented from participating in the negotiations in Brest-Litovsk, as the Romanian feared he would support the incorporation of Bessarabia into the Russian Federation. By 20 January, the Sfatul Țării and the Council of Directors had lost any power they had over Bessarabia, with the Soviets gaining the upper hand. The Frontotdel opened the military depots and distributed weapons to the local population, which constituted Red Guards. On the night of the 20th, it put Chișinău under martial law, dispersed the Sfatul Țării and outlawed the Council of Directors and any organizations conducting "counter-revolutionary activity". Fearing arrest, many members of the Sfatul Țării went into hiding or left the city, while some of the directors, with the help of the French military attaché and the landholder Pantelimon V. Sinadino, leader of the Union of Landowners of Bessarabia, left for Iași to request for a Romanian intervention.

=== Main thrust and capture of Chișinău ===
The Romanian forces which carried out the intervention into Bessarabia amounted to two infantry and two cavalry divisions, totalling 50,000. On 20 January the Romanian Command ordered its troops to cross the Prut, and the first Romanian units entered Bessarabia the following day. In the morning of 23 January [O.S. 10 January], the 11th Romanian Division of general Ernest Broșteanu crossed the Prut. The 11th Infantry Division was supposed to capture Chișinău and advance towards Tighina, the 1st Cavalry Division to attack Bălți and Soroca, the 13th Infantry Division to occupy southern Bessarabia, while the 2nd Cavalry Division was meant to link the two infantry divisions in the area of Cimișlia. On 25 January all Romanian division were merged into the 6th Corps under General Ioan Istrate. On the defending side, the Frontotdel controlled around 6,000 troops in Chișinău, including the 1st Moldavian Infantry Regiment, 1st Bessarabian Hussar Regiment, 1st Moldavian Hussar Regiment, the 3rd and 5th Zaamursky Cavalry Regiments, the 14th Artillery Brigade, and several volunteer Red Guards squads; these troops were tasked with "retaining the city until reinforcements arrived, and with their arrival go on the offensive and expel the Romanians from the Moldavian Republic". The defenders included among their rank Filipp Levenson, Sholem Schwarzbard, Grigory Kotovsky and Iona Yakir. Two days later, Inculeţ and the representatives of the Moldovan military committees met in Călărași with general Broșteanu. Both sides agreed that the Romanians "will not interfere in the internal affairs of Bessarabia"; however, when informed by the Moldovan delegates that the death penalty had been abolished in Bessarabia, Broșteanu replied he would be the ultimate judge and would hand any punishment he deemed fit. Romanian prime-minister Take Ionescu would later declare "the whole world knew that the troops were sent to Bessarabia in order to complete, when possible, the final act of union with Bessarabia". In Odessa, the 20 January Plenary session of the Central Executive Committee of the Rumcherod decided to consider itself "in a state of war with Romania" and declared a general mobilization for volunteers detachments in the districts of Odessa, Tiraspol, Kherson, Akkerman and Bender. The Rumcherod also decided the internment of any Romanian officials in the city and the sequestration of Romanian properties there. The decision was party overturned the following day, the Rumcherod hoping to obtain a diplomatic resolution to the conflict. On 23 January, the Rumcherod formally transmitted to the Romanian consul and the British and French missions the request that the Romanian government withdraw its troops from Bessarabia and the Russian troops on the Romanian front be allowed free passage towards Russia. While the Romanian representative denied the entry of Romanian troops, the Entente mission replied that the troops had been sent to protect Romanian depots.

During the first days of the offensive, the Romanian troops that had crossed the Prut between Ungheni and Leova occupied Ungheni, Căinari and Pogănești. On their way, they seized the railway facilities and food depots, dispersed the Soviets and peasant committees and shot their members, requisitioning food supplies from the peasants. After three days of battle, the Romanian troops advancing from Hîncești and Strășeni captured Chișinău on the evening of 26 January 1918 [O.S. 13 January], being greeted by Erhan and Pântea, accompanied by several Moldavian squadrons. According to some reports, several Moldavian units fought "shoulder to shoulder" along Russian revolutionaries against the Romanian Army; Polivțev claiming that reports of the Sfatul Țării indicated that 86% of the Moldavian troops fought on the side of the Frontotdel and "soldiers were determined to kill the officers suspected of betrayal". The Soviet troops withdrew to Tighina without opposing the Romanian troops in the city itself. According to Vladimir Polivțev, factors that led to failure of the Chișinău defence included the general inferiority of the troops, mismanagement of the existing units, inter-party frictions among the various Soviet organizations and the success of supporters of the Sfatul Țării among the officers to neutralize part of the Moldavian regiments. Thus, some officers managed to send Moldavian troops away from the city in a passive sector of defence, while supporters of Shcherbachev still active among the troops in southern Bessarabia were also able to prevent the Russian units of the 47th Corps and other units of the 6th Army from coming to the assistance of the defenders. The day Chișinău fell the Petrograd government decided to sever all diplomatic relations with Romania and expel its representatives, declared the Romanian gold reserves "inviolable to the Romanian oligarchy" and declared Shcherbachev an "enemy of the people". The following day, Broșteanu officially entered the city, the Romanian army organizing a parade. As the Romanian government failed to respond to its protests, the Rumcherod announced on 4 February that it considered itself at war with Romania and, on 6 February, ordered the units of the Romanian Front and the Odessa Military District to "immediately provide armed resistance to the Romanian military units that entered Bessarabia, as well as in any other locality when the Romanian forces attempted to disarm the Soviet troops or seize military material and equipment".

Vladimir Polivțev claims that following the Romanian capture of Chișinău a wave of repression ensued: Staff Captain N.V. Durasov, assistant chief of the Revolutionary Headquarters was executed, the 1st Moldavian Infantry Regiment was disarmed and 17 of its soldiers were shot after refusing to swear allegiance to the Romanian King. The other Moldavian units were either dissolved or merged with the Romanian units. Executions were not limited to supporters of the Soviets, as several anti-Bolshevik socialists were shot, including the Menshevik member of Sfatul Țării Nadejda Grinfeld and the popular socialist Nikolai Kovsan, editor of Svobodnaya Bessarabiya. Director of Military Affairs Gherman Pântea had to admit on 2 February that "frequent executions" were taking place in Chișinău, while Ivan Krivorukov, at the time secretary of the Central Bureau of the Trade Union, testified that executions were carried of without trial, some of the victims being buried half-dead in the landfill in Rîșcani. Chișinău was put under a state of siege and a curfew was imposed concurrent with extensive searches of private properties. Most revolutionary organizations, including the Central Moldovan Military Executive Committee, were dissolved, along with the trade unions and mutual-aid funds.

On 28 January [O.S. 15 January], during an extraordinary joint meeting of Sfatul Țării and the government, Inculeț welcomed and argued the Romanian military presence in Bessarabia, speaking about the guarantees of the Romanians, while Erhan assured general Broșteanu that the government in Chișinău will take all measures to support the action of the Romanian army.

=== Third Peasants Congress ===
Opposition to the Romanian intervention continued elsewhere in Bessarabia, with Erhan noting in his 26 January speech in Sfatul Țării that the influence of Bolsheviks and distrust of Sfatul Țării was especially high in the districts of Akkerman, Ismail, Khotyn and Soroca. On 31 January began in Chișinău the Third Bessarabian Provincial Congress of Soviets of Peasant Deputies, which had been postponed since the fall of 1917. Due to ongoing military operations, few delegates from the Akkerman, Ismail and Khotyn could assist, with most delegates coming from the central, Moldavian-majority parts of Bessarabia. The majority rejected Erhan's candidacy for president and instead elected the Moldavian Vasile Rudiev, who had earlier been designated commissioner for Bălți by the Sfatul Țării and, as head of the Bălți district Congress of Peasants, had protested against the Romanian intervention and called for the recognition of the Petrograd government on 27 January. The following day, the Bessarabian Provincial Peasants' Congress unanimously voted a resolution that "all power should belong to the Soviets of workers, soldiers and peasants' deputies" and chose a commission to draw up a declaration of protest against the occupation of Bessarabia. Rudiev personally called for guarantees for freedom of speech, assembly, and the inviolability of the members of the congress, demanded the restoration of a sovereign Moldavian Republic, with the Romanians expelled from the country within 24 hours. His discourse was met with prolonged applause. Half an hour after Rudiev's speech, Romanian troops cordoned off the building where the Congress was taking place, brought four machine guns within the hall and sent in a military squad demanding the extradition of the speakers who "had insulted the Romanian government". Rudiev and another member of the presidium, Valentin Prahnițkii, went off to negotiate with Broșteanu, and later three more members of the Congress were arrested (Teofil Cotoros, Ion Panţiru and Procop Ciumacenco). The five delegates, four Moldavians and one Ukrainian, were subsequently executed by the Romanians. As the five were also members of Sfatul Țării and were legally inviolable, the Council of Directors inquired into the fate of the delegates, however Broșteanu dismissed them replying he did not consider the arrests "interference in the internal affairs of the republic" and that "no one can interfere with him" in the fight against the "Bolsheviks". Meltyukhov and Polivțev note that ultimately 45 of the 116 delegates that participated in the Congress were shot.

=== Battle of Bender ===
With the help of Moldavia's detachments, the Romanians continued their advance towards Hotin, Ismail, Bender/Tighina and Cetatea Albă. Especially fierce resistance was met at Bender, a strategic railroad junction and the site of a major fortress, where the Frontotdel had retreated. The decision to resist was taken on 24 January at a rally of the soldiers of the local garrison and local workers, when the Bender Defence Headquarters was created comprising the Frontotdel, members of the Chișinău Soviet and commanders of revolutionary detachments who had evaded the Romanian troops, as well as local supporters of the Soviet power (Bolsheviks and other socialists alike). Opposing the Romanian 11th Infantry Division were the 5th and 6th Cavalry Regiments, hastily created Red Guards detachments recruited from the railways workshops and residents of the city, as well as the soldiers of the 4th Moldavian Regiment in Bender. The Romanians advanced in late January from Chișinău and Căinari; the latter column was intercepted by a pre-emptive strike organized by the Bender Red Guards using a makeshift armoured train which resulted in the capture and disarmament of 844 Romanians. As the Defence Headquarters decided to send regular troops across the Dniester for reorganization and replenishment, the Red Guards also bore the brunt of the Romanian attack on the city, which begun on 29 January. In spite of intense artillery support, the Romanians were unable to enter the city for two days, while the defenders were able to capture several trophies. After the city's artillery munition depots blew up, either due to a direct hit or to sabotage, and large sections of the city were engulfed in flames, the Red Guards decided to retreat across the Dniester on the morning of 2 February. A wave of repression against social activists, surviving defenders and the trade unions began after the entry of Romanian troops. On 5 February after a Romanian attempt to cross the Dniester, a battle over the control of the bridge over the river unexpectedly turned into a Soviet counter-attack, and most of the city was retaken around 8 AM, as Romanian troops retreated in disorder. The main Soviet counter-attack began the following day, when the troops of the Frontotdel, reinforced by volunteer soldiers from the 8th Army, Red Guard detachments from Odessa and Nikolaev, as well as around 500 Romanian pro-Soviet volunteers organized by the Romanian Revolutionary Military Committee, succeeded in taking over the fortress and clearing the whole city of Romanian regular troops. The Soviet offensive drove back the Romanian 22nd Infantry Brigade 10–15 kilometres (6.2–9.3 miles) towards Bulboaca and Căușeni and captured significant personnel and trophies. Reinforced Romanian troops attacked the city again of 7 February from Bulboaca and Calfa and the Soviet troops ultimately retreated across the Dniester due to heavy losses; the Romanian also managed to capture some settlements across the river. Romanian losses during the battle for Bender amounted to 141 people, including 3 officers. A wave of brutal reprisal began against the local population, with the Romanians putting around 5,000 residents under armed guard near the railway station, and confiscated food stocks from Bender and the neighbouring villages. Around 150 railway workers, as well as other locals, were executed in front of the crowd. Following the mediation of foreign diplomats, a 48 hours ceasefire was signed on 8 February.

=== Battle of Bălți and northern campaign ===
News of what the locals saw as a Romanian invasion also alerted the various committees in Bălți, which on 21 January organized the Revolutionary Headquarters for the Protection of Bessarabia, led by the Moldavians Andrei Paladi, chairman of the Bălți district peasants' soviet, Grigore Galagan, chairman of the local land committee, and Vasile Rudiev, the local government commissioner. The following day, Paladi urged the locals to organize defence squads, while the local soviet issued a manifesto declaring "Death is better than new slavery under the yoke of the bloodsucker, the Romanian king". Later that day, a rally was held that was attended by 3,000 workers, soldiers of the garrison and representatives of nearby villages, expressing protest against the entry of the occupation forces into Bessarabia and subsequently weapons from the military depots were distributed to the population. The Congress of Bălți district Peasants' deputies adopted on 27 January a resolution rejecting the authority of Sfatul Țării and recognizing the Council of People's Commissars, protesting against separation from Russia and calling for the power to be invested into soviets of peasants', soldiers' and workers' representatives. Committees and organizations at all levels were to be re-elected, delegates were to be sent to Petrograd to request help against the Romanian entry into Bessarabian territory, and organizations in other Bessarabian districts were invited to endorse the decisions of the Bălți district Congress. To prevent the landowners from requesting Romanian assistance, their telephone lines were severed and the telephone exchange was taken under the control of the Congress.

The main organizer of the defence forces was Staff Captain Anatol Popa, veteran of World War I, a former member of the Chișinău Central Military Commissariat involved in the creation of the 1st Moldavian Regiment, who earlier in January had been appointed by the Sfatul Țării as military commissioner for the Bălți district. Popa was the one to actually conduct the defence, as Paladi had been sent by the Bălți Peasants' Congress to the north to request assistance from the 8th Army and Council of People's Commissars, while Rudiev left for Chișinău to participate in the Third Bessarabian Peasants Congress. By 2 February, Popa managed to muster an infantry battalion, two cavalry squadrons, a separate machine-gun company, an automobile company and an incomplete artillery battery, further reinforced by armed groups of peasants from nearby Cubolta and Hăsnășenii Mici. Thus the total force included, besides the soldiers of the city garrison, up to one thousand volunteers organized in Red Guards. Trenches were dug around the city and guns and machine guns were installed at the main entry points. On 3 February 1918, the 1st Romanian cavalry division crossed the Prut at Sculeni and advanced towards Fălești, where it was fired upon by the Red Guards; the town was ultimately captured after two successive attacks. The following day, Romanian General Mihail Schina was captured by a peasant self-defence force in Obreja, but, after barely escaping lynching, he was freed by an attack of the Romanian cavalry. Romanian attempts to break into Bălți from the south on 4 February were repulsed by machine gun and artillery fire, and the attacking troops were forced to retreat by the heavy losses. Another attack near the railway station was also blocked by the resistance of revolutionary soldiers and local volunteers. Having numeric superiority, Romanian troops eventually occupied the city around 3 PM on 5 February after a fierce battle, though shooting continued within the city until dark. Advancing northwards, a Romanian detachment captured Soroca on 6 February, and on the 12th the Romanian troops assisted the Polish legions in capturing Yampol across the Dniester. The Aslanduz Infantry Regiment and the Ocnița Red Guards only approached the Bălți after Romanians had occupied it, and were thus unable to render support to the defence forces. During the following days and until late February, together with a part of the Bălți defenders and peasant armed groups, these troops continued fighting the Romanian advance along the Bălți-Ocnița railway (at Sofia, Drochia, Tîrnova and Dondușeni) and afterwards, under the leadership of Paladi, fought off the Romanians in the Rîbnița-Șoldănești area. Meanwhile, between 5 and 6 February about 1,000 people were arrested and 20 shot in Bălți by the Romanian Army as reprisals. Anatol Popa was court-martialled and sentenced to death, but pardoned due to his popularity, and invited to join the Romanian Army. He decided instead to flee and would later lead several Soviet units in the Russian Civil War. The Romanian Siguranța reported on 8 February that unrest among peasants in the Bălți district against the Romanian presence was still vigorous.

=== Southern campaign ===
In the southern part of the province, the Romanian intervention was carried out by the 13th Infantry Division, the 2nd Cavalry Division, the 5th Călărași Brigade and other smaller units. The Romanian advance met various degrees of resistance and skirmishes took place in various places. Already on 23 January, a Congress of Budjak peasants' and workers' self-determination held in Akkerman rejected the authority of Sfatul Țării and decided to fight against the invaders. The same day, after an artillery bombardment, the Romanians captured Cahul and started reprisals against the defenders. On 24 January the defenders of Bolhrad dispersed the attacking units using machine guns; however, the main forces of the 2nd Cavalry Division defeated their resistance the following day. Several days later, the Bulgarian peasants in Taraclia assembled a 250-strong detachment armed with rifles, scythes and pitchforks, but the town surrendered after the Romanian artillery opened fire. Skirmishes and intense fights also erupted between Romanian troops and hastily organized volunteers at Comrat and the railway stations in Ceadîr-Lunga and Basarabeasca. The city of Izmail was taken after intense fights and shelling by Romanian warships. The defenders, numbering several hundred soldiers and sailors, resisted from 3 to 6 February, as political confusion prevailed in the city. As reprisals, the Romanians arrested 1,500 locals and executed 14 sailors, while the members of the soviet of sailor deputies were hanged. Part of the defenders retreated to Kiliya where, together with local self-defence forces, managed to resist ten days until the town was also captured on 7 February after a short battle. The defenders were also supported by Romanian sailors organized by a revolutionary committee led by Gheorghe Stroici. Romanian soldiers and workers on the military and civilian vessels of the Romanian fleet had mutinied on 27–28 January, raised the red flag and helped defend the city. After the capture of Kiliya, its defenders left for Odessa.

Fights around Vâlcov erupted on the evening of 8 February, with sentinel ships under Soviet command responding to fire from the Romanian post in Periprava. The following day, Romanian monitors of the 2nd Marine Division shelled the town and the transport ships present in its harbour, prompting the K-15 floating battery to return fire. While auxiliary ships managed to leave the harbour, the Soviet gunboats succeeded in damaging one Romanian monitor and destroying their artillery fire-directing centre, forcing them to retreat upriver. Fighting against the Romanian Danube Flotilla, the defenders were supported by several military vessels sent from Odessa and Sevastopol and up to 1,000 revolutionary soldiers and Red Guards. On 12 February a detachment of 200 Baltic Fleet sailors arrived in town, led by the anarchist Anatoli Zhelezniakov, who took command of the defending troops; the following day troops were landed on a nearby Danube island, denying the Romanians use of the river. Resistance continued until 28 February, when the surviving ships left for Odessa and Nikolaev. Two ex-Russian floating batteries, K-2 and K-7, were captured by the Romanians in the Danube estuary during February. These vessels, part of the numerous Russud class, each displaced 255 long tons (259 t) and measured 54.7 metres (179 ft 6 in) in length, with a beam of 7.1 metres (23 ft 4 in) and with a draught of 1.2 metres (3 ft 11 in). They had a top speed of 5.5 knots (10.2 km/h; 6.3 mph) generated by two-shaft diesel engines and were each armed with two 152-millimetre (6 in) guns. Unable to evacuate them, the Soviet abandoned in various Bessarabian Danube harbours submarine No. 3, river blocker "Odessa", minesweeper "Yulia", eight riverboats, a messenger ship and a number of support vessels.

After the capture of Vâlcov, resistance continued with a two-day defence in Tatarbunary and the village of Kubey. In the meantime, Ukrainian troops of the Central Rada took over the Eser-controlled city of Akkerman on 28 January, but two days later, after a rally of the local soldiers, the Bolsheviks gained control over the city. Romanian troops reached the outskirts of the city in early March; following a general mobilization in the county, the 1st Bessarabian Regiment was established and was assigned a defensive position 30 kilometres (19 miles) from the city. With support in ammunition and reinforcements from Odessa, the 2,000-strong garrison managed to hold its ground until 9 March.

=== Battles on the Dniester ===
Fighting continued in Bessarabia throughout the month of February, as Romanian attempts to restore law and order were resisted by the peasants and various revolutionary units. Andrei Brezianu and Vlad Spânu claim that the last detachments of communist revolutionaries were driven over the Dniester and out of the country on 20 February [O.S. 7 February], however Polivțev notes that Soviet power was maintained in the district of Khotyn, the northern part of the district of Soroca and most of the district of Akkerman until the signing of a Romanian-Soviet armistice on 5 March.

Two days after the Ukrainian declaration of independence severed direct connections between Bessarabia and Russia, on 6 February the Moldavian Democratic Republic proclaimed its independence after intense debates. The Bolsheviks captured Odessa on 29 – 30 January, resulting in Rumcherod being succeeded by the Odessa Soviet Republic on 30 January [O.S. 17 January] 1918.

Meanwhile, Soviet success against the Ukrainian troops allowed the creation in Odessa of a Supreme Collegium to combat the Romanian and Bessarabian counter-revolution, whose leader, Christian Rakovsky, was tasked by the Council of People's Commissars with the task of "driving the Romanian counter-revolutionary forces out of Bessarabia and provoking a revolutionary movement in Romania". Negotiations with the Romanians were interrupted on 15 February and the Romanian side was presented with an ultimatum requesting the immediate evacuation of its troops from Bessarabia, the surrender of all seized Russian military property, the dispersal of Russian and other national counter-revolutionary units, the extradition of General Shcherbachev, and the punishment of those responsible for the killings and executions of Russian military personnel. Fighting consequently resumed on 16 February, however the Soviet attempts to capture Bender or advance upriver on the Danube failed. Romanian attempts to cross the Dniester were also blocked after skirmishes at Crocmaz and Palanca

On 14 February, Lenin appointed Mikhail Muravyov as the commander of the Bessarabia and Transnistria Front, tasked with halting the Romanian offensive and recapturing Bessarabia. The Soviet leader ordered him to march on Bessarabia on 17 February and, within a day, Muravyov managed to transfer 3,000 of his troops from Kiev to Dniester; there, they united with the 3rd Army under Eser Petr Lazarev, which was created on 21 February based on all Soviet units between Galați and Sevastopol. The 3rd Army numbered some 4,000 to 5,000 undisciplined militiamen from Odessa and small numbers of former regular army soldiers of the 4th and 6th armies: the 5th and 6th Zaamursky Cavalry Regiments, the 1st Dniester Infantry Regiment, Kotovsky's cavalry regiment, three light batteries with 12 guns, one howitzer division with 11 guns, an armoured detachment, an engineers battalion and smaller units. These troops were concentrated in the area of Tiraspol, Parcani, Grigoriopol, Dubăsari and Slobozia. A detachment of the committee of the 6th Army was deployed in the south, between Cioburciu and the Black Sea. Upon assuming command of the Front on 18 February, Muravyov sent Lenin the following telegram:

“The situation is extremely serious. The troops of the former front are disorganized, in reality there is no front, only headquarters remain, the location of which is unknown. The hope is only for reinforcements from outside. The Odessa proletariat is disorganized and politically illiterate. Ignoring the fact that the enemy is approaching Odessa, they do not think to worry. The attitude to the matter is very cold - typical of the Odessites."

Taking command of the Soviet forces acting against Romania on 19 February, Muravyov planned to advance on Iași from three directions: Mogilev-Podolsky, Rîbnița and Bender. On 20 February Muravyov's troops launched an offensive against the Romanian troops which attempted to establish bridgeheads across the Dniester in the area of Bender. The Romanians were successfully repulsed and lost three guns. Another Romanian attempt to cross the Dniester was halted in the village of Troitske on 1 March. To the north, Pavel Yegorov's troops, marching from Kiev, encountered a Romanian detachment between Rîbnița and Slobidka, routing them after a combined blow. Soviet troops, primarily the 3rd Army, went on the counter-offensive and, after six days of fighting, defeated the Romanians in the area of Slobozia and Rîbnița again by 2 March. The main battle took place at Rîbnița, where the Soviets captured 15-18 guns, a large number of small arms and 500 prisoners. Soviet troops also advanced around 15 kilometres (9.3 miles) across the Dniester, recapturing Rezina, Șoldănești and other villages.

=== Intervention of the Central Powers and failed armistice ===
In the meantime, as the Soviet delegation left the peace negotiations at Brest-Litovsk without agreeing to the vast territorial losses requested by Germany, the Central Powers signed a separate peace with the Ukrainian People's Republic on 9 February. In order to force the Soviet government into signing the peace, and considering the Ukrainian government's failure to overcome the Soviet forces, the German Army resumed its offensive on the entire front on 18 February. On the same day, Field Marshall August von Mackensen, Commander of the German-Austrian troops, met the newly appointed Romanian prime-minister Alexandru Averescu in Iași in order to discuss a peace treaty. Mackensen personally assured Averescu that Romania would be able to maintain troops in Bessarabia and would receive freedom of action against the Soviet in exchange for signing the peace with the Central Powers and supporting the export of agricultural products from Ukraine. Following the example of its German ally, the Austro-Hungarian Army also launched an anti-Soviet offensive in its section of the front on 24–28 February, capturing the Bessarabian towns of Novoselytsia and Khotyn on the same day and advancing towards Ocnița, where they met the Romanian army. Following a German ultimatum on 28 February, Romania was pressured into signing a preliminary peace treaty in Buftea on 5 March; according to the terms, Romania relinquished Dobruja and significant territories on the Austro-Hungarian border, accepted heavy economic clauses and agreed to the demobilization of its army. Romanian troops in Bessarabia were however excepted from the demobilization. The Romanian Command and the Central Powers agreed that Austro-Hungarian troops would occupy the district of Khotyn and the northern part of the district of Soroca, while the armies of the Central Powers would be allowed free passage through Romanian-occupied Bessarabia. Consequently, the Austro-German 25th Army Corps advanced through northern Bessarabia towards Kiev, the 27th Austro-Hungarian Corps advanced through central Bessarabia towards Rîbnița, Birzula and Odessa, while the 52nd German Army Corps advanced through Bender towards Odessa. As a result, on 3 March the Soviet Government finally agreed to sign the peace settlement, however the Austro-German troops, at the time on the Kamenetsk-Vinnitsa-Cherkasy-Kiev line, continued their offensive. On the same day, Soviet troops in the area of Rezina retreated across the Dniester in an attempt to relieve Zhmerynka from a combined Austrian and Ukrainian attack.

Faced with severe military setbacks on the Dniester, difficult negotiations with the Central Powers, and the arrest of numerous Romanian notables in Odessa, the Romanian Army proposed a truce to the Soviets, seeking Entente support. As they believed the general situation in Romania and Bessarabia was favourable to their cause, and the Austro-German invasion was pressing from the north, the local Soviet representatives accepted the offer. On 21 February, the Entente representatives in Romania mandated Italian envoy, Fasciotti, to communicate to the Soviets that the Romanian intervention "represents a military operation without any political character", undertaken "to guarantee the supply of food to the Russian and Romanian troops and the civilian population", and called for negotiations between the two sides. The Council of People's Commissars of Odessa Region presented their terms on 24 February: Romania was to declare it will withdraw its army from Bessarabia within two months and to reduce its presence to 10,000 troops tasked exclusively with guarding Romanian warehouses and railways; policing was to be ensured by local forces; Russian military forces were to gradually replace the retreating Romanian troops; the Romanian command was to cease any intervention in the internal political life of Bessarabia, and refrain from undertaking or supporting hostile actions against Soviet Russia; all disputes were to be resolved by a joint commission, with the participation of Entente representatives; Romanian troops were to be provided safe haven in Russian in case of a German invasion, and local resources were to be provided to Romania after meeting the needs of the locals and the Russian troops. The Romanian side generally accepted all conditions, with the exception of the immediate evacuation of Bender. They further demanded a complete exchange of prisoners, including the Romanian notables arrested in Odessa; it also requested that an international commission be created excluding Romania and Russia, all Romanian food depots and funds seized in Russia be returned, and Romania be allowed to procure food from elsewhere in Russia in case it could not fulfil its needs from Bessarabia. The Soviets declared their acceptance of the conditions on 5 March, with the document signed by the Rumcherod, the Council of People's Commissars of Odessa Region, the executive committee of the Soviets, and by Canadian colonel Joseph W. Boyle as Entente representative. On the same day the Romanian government signed the "Protocol for the Elimination of the Russian-Romanian conflict" and transmitted it to Odessa through Entente representatives, where it was signed by the local Soviet leaders on 9 March. In an exchange of telegrams, both sides agreed to cease hostilities. While Soviet troops ceased hostilities on 8 March, the Romanians broke the treaty the following day at the urging of the Central Powers, which were advancing on Odessa and captured the city on 14–15 March. Consequently, on the same day Romanian troops captured Akkerman and Shabo, the last Soviet held positions in Bessarabia.

== Aftermath ==
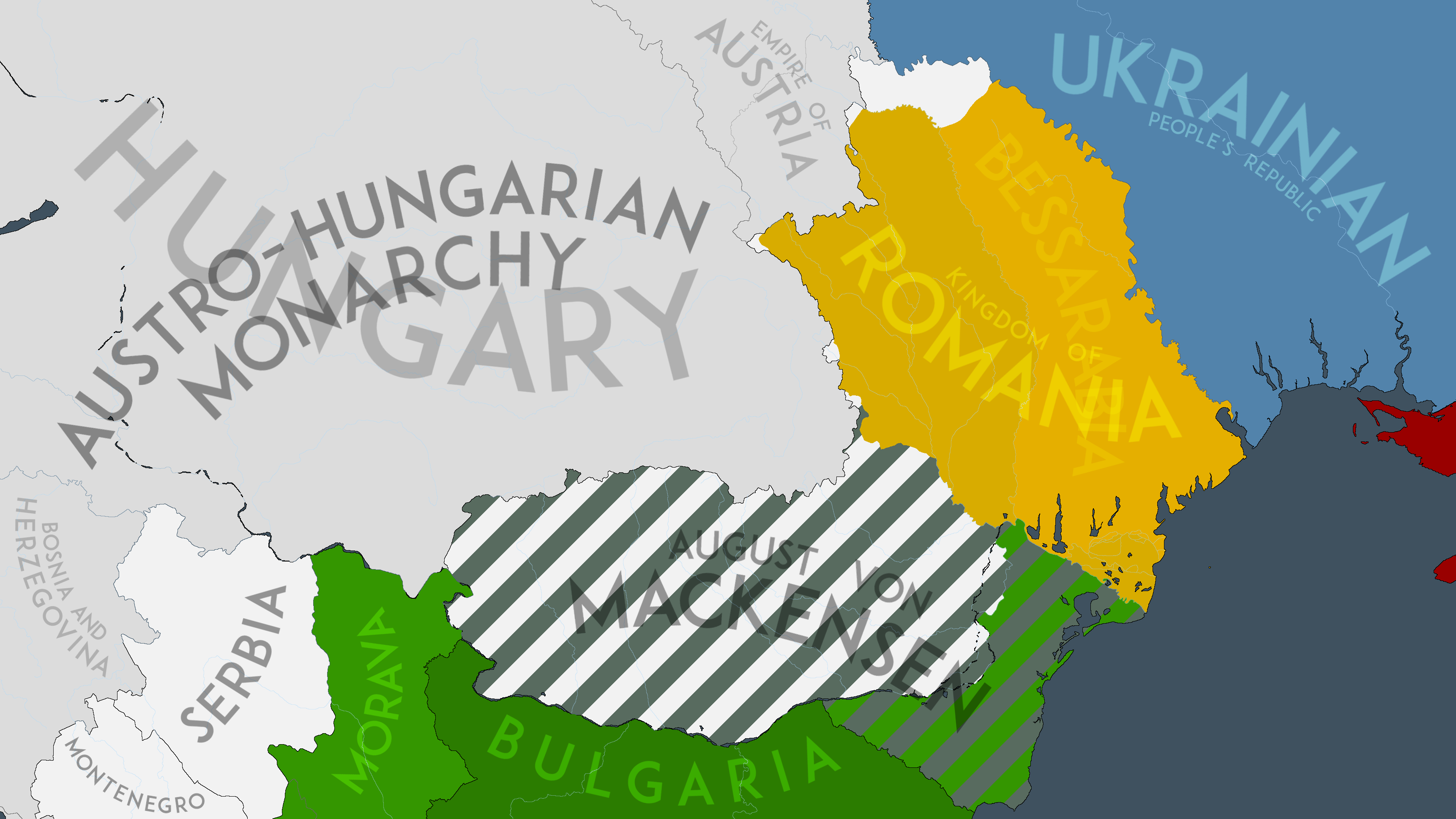
Map of Romania after the union with Bessarabia on 9 April 1918

Romanian losses in the final phases of the Bessarabian intervention amounted to 488 people (25 killed, 312 wounded, 151 missing). The only clause of the Romanian-Soviet agreement that was fulfilled was a partial exchange of prisoners: 92 Romanian senators, members of Parliament, and officers were exchanged for 73 officers and soldiers of the Russian army on 19–24 March 1918, in Sulina. The exact number of casualties suffered by the Soviet and other revolutionary forces in the Bessarabian campaign is very difficult to estimate. Victor A. Savchenko claims that approximately 1,500 to 2,000 were killed in the battles that took place in Transnistria and Budjak.

Charles King claims that, although it occurred at the requests of members of Sfatul Țării and other Moldavian organizations, the occupation of Bessarabia by the Romanians was not welcomed by all. Thus, according to Ciobanu, in an appeal to the citizens of Chișinău, members of the Bessarabian government denied that the Romanian troops had ever been invited to occupy the republic, stating that their only purpose was to take control of the railways from the Bolsheviks. Marcel Mitrasca claims that the benefits brought by the restoration of public order and the assurances of the Romanians that they will not interfere in the Bessarabia's political life determined many people to change their attitude.

Vladimir Polivțev claims that though the Romanian Army and some members of the Sfatul Țării claimed the Romanian intervention was directed against the Bolsheviks, opposition to the Romanian occupation also came from Socialist Revolutionaries such as Cotoros and Ciumacenco, or Mensheviks such as Borisov and Krivorukov. Some of them would eventually join the Bolsheviks only after the suppression of the Moldavian autonomy (Krivorukov, Levenson and Borisov later in 1918, Kotovsky in 1920, Paladi in 1930). Many of the prominent fighters against the Romanians were not affiliated with leftist politics, their main objective being the resolution of the agrarian, labour or national issues.

On 6 February [O.S. 24 January] 1918, as Ukraine's independence had shattered hopes for a Russian Federation, Sfatul Țării voted on the Declaration on the Independence of the Moldavian Democratic Republic, renouncing all ties with Russia. Economically isolated and alarmed by the claims of both the Ukrainian and Soviet governments on Bessarabia, Sfatul Țării voted for a union with Romania on 9 April [O.S. 27 March] 1918.

This move was condemned by the Soviet government as a flagrant violation of previous agreements and devoid of legal power, while the Ukrainian People's Republic severed diplomatic relations with Romania and issued financial sanctions against Bessarabia. According to Denis Maltsev, Romania initiated a campaign of Romanianization in Bessarabia, banning the printing of posters in languages other than Romanian and later forcefully incorporating Orthodox churches into the Romanian Orthodox Church.

Between April and May 1919, when the Bolsheviks had already firmly established their rule over the Ukrainian Black Sea coast, the Red Army developed a plan to reconquer Bessarabia and come to the aid of the Hungarian Soviet Republic. Those plans were frustrated by the outbreak of Nykyfor Hryhoriv's uprising and AFSR's breach of the front at Donbass. Romania consolidated its hold over Bessarabia only after suppressing the Ukrainian minority-led Khotyn Uprising (January–February 1919) and the pro-Bolshevik Bender (May 1919) and Tatarbunary (September 1924) uprisings.

The first draft of treaty on Bessarabia's status was submitted at the Paris Peace Conference on 14 April 1920. Although initially they were not against the Union, on 10 August, the United States withdrew from the negotiation process stating that it will respect Russia's territorial integrity. On 28 October 1920, the United Kingdom, France, Italy and Japan signed the Treaty of Paris recognizing Romanian sovereignty over Bessarabia, nevertheless Japan did not ratify the document and the treaty failed to come into force. Soviet-Romanian Conferences in Warsaw (1921) and Vienna (1924), likewise failed to officially settle Bessarabia's legal status. The relations between Romania and the Soviet Union were resumed only in December 1934, however Bessarabia remained the only section of the Soviet western frontier not recognized by the government in Moscow, the region's "liberation from Romanian occupation" being a mainstay of Soviet foreign policy goals, according to Meltyukhov. The Romanian gold reserve and most of the treasure confiscated by Russia have never been returned to Romania.

== See also ==
- List of states and regions involved in the Russian Civil War
- Bibliography of the Russian Revolution and Civil War
- Outline of the Russian Revolution and Civil War
- Bessarabian question
