= Pogănești =

Pogănești may refer to the following places:

== Romania ==
- Pogănești, a village in Zam, Hunedoara Commune, Hunedoara County
- Pogănești, a village in Bârna Commune, Timiș County
- Pogănești, a village in Stănilești Commune, Vaslui County

== Moldova ==
- Pogănești, a village in Hîncești District
