= Odessa Soviet Republic =

1918 Soviet republic in Eastern Europe

Coordinates: 49°54′N 36°18′E

Odessa Soviet Republic Одесская Советская Республика (Russian) Одеська Радянська Республіка (Ukrainian)
- January–March 1918
- Flag Coat of arms

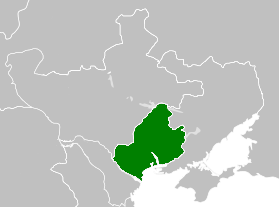
- Area claimed by the Odessa Soviet Republic in March 1918 (in green)
- Status: Puppet state of Soviet Russia
- Capital: Odessa
- Government: Soviet republic
- Chairman
  - 1918: Vladimir Yudovsky
- Legislature: Council of the People's Commissars
- Historical era: World War I
  - Republic proclaimed: 17 January 1918
  - Disestablished: 13 March 1918
- Currency: Odessa ruble
Preceded by	Succeeded by
Ukrainian People's Republic; Rumcherod	Ukrainian People's Republic; Ukrainian Soviet Republic
- Today part of: Ukraine; Moldova

The Odessa Soviet Republic (OSR; Ukrainian: Одеська Радянська Республіка, romanized: Odeska Radianska Respublika; Russian: Одесская Советская Республика) was a short-lived Soviet republic formed on 30 January [O.S. 17 January] 1918 from parts of the Kherson and Bessarabia Governorates of the former Russian Empire.

== Brief description ==
The republic was proclaimed during the Bolshevik invasion of Ukraine immediately before Bolshevik forces pushed the Ukrainian government out of Kiev and Sfatul Țării proclaimed the independence of the Moldavian Democratic Republic. The Odessa Soviet's governing body was the Rumcherod, formed in May 1917 shortly after the February Revolution. After its Second Congress, the OSR's Soviet was chaired by Vladimir Yudovsky. He had been installed after a pro-Bolshevik coup d'état organized by the Narkom Nikolai Krylenko.

In January 1918, Yudovsky was appointed Chairman of the local Council of the People's Commissars and formed a government that included Bolsheviks, anarchists and members of the Socialist-Revolutionary Party. The government proclaimed Odessa a free city and pledged allegiance to the Bolshevik government in Petrograd. The following month, the government was liquidated by Mikhail Muravyov and merged with the regional Central Executive Committee Rumcherod.

Political instability meant that the OSR was not recognized by any other government, including Russian Bolsheviks, during its brief existence. The Republic failed to stop the Romanian occupation of Bessarabia, a region to which it laid claim. It ceased to exist altogether when it was sacked by German and Austro-Hungarian troops on 13 March 1918, two months after its creation, following the Treaty of Brest-Litovsk between the Central Powers, Ukrainian People's Republic and Petrograd Sovnarkom. The government and army evacuated first to Nikolayev, then to Sevastopol and finally to Rostov-on-Don.

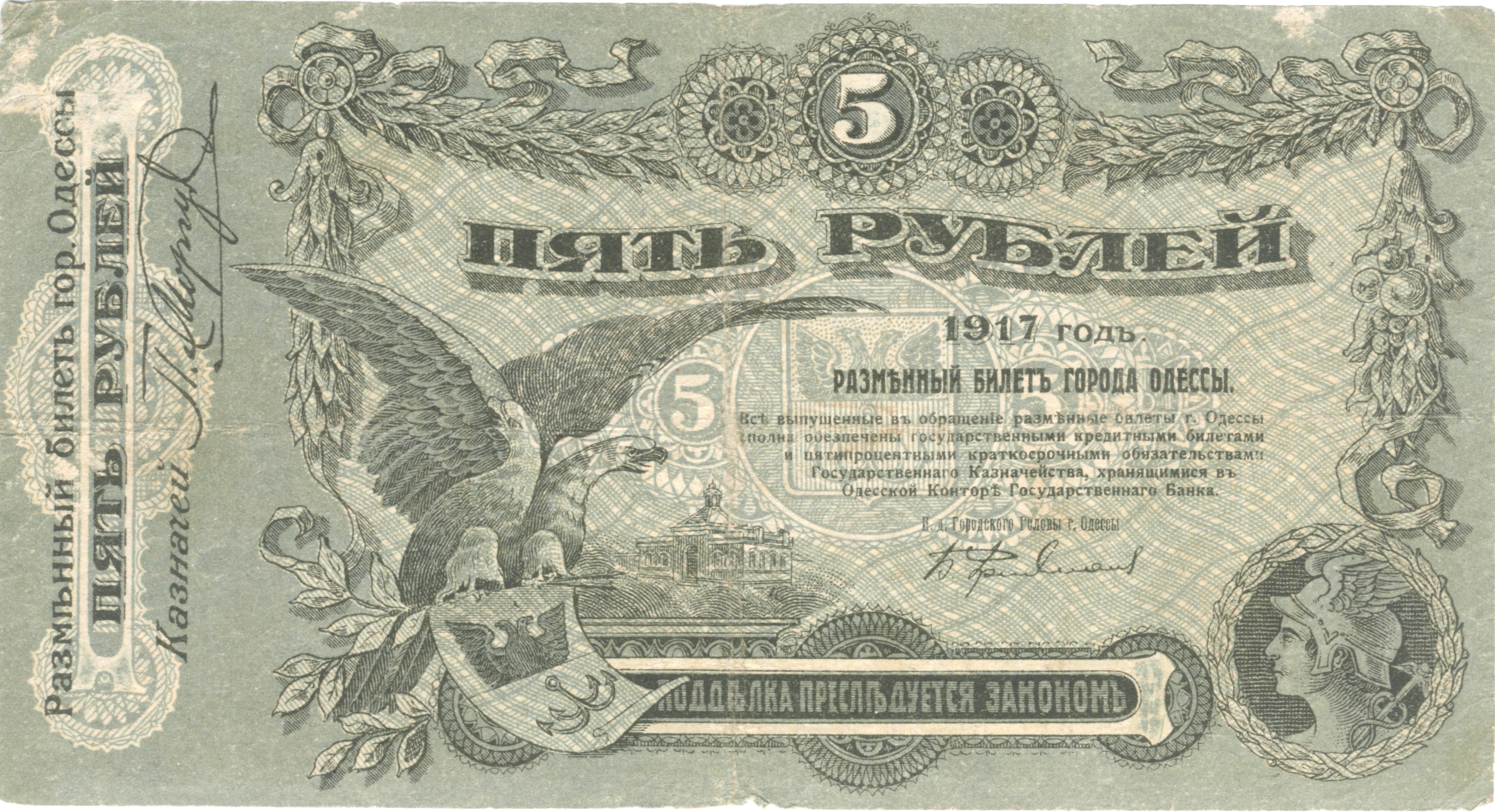
Imperial Odessan five-rouble note, January 1917.

== See also ==
- Mishka Yaponchik, sponsor of the city and anti-bourgeoisie fighter.
- Special Odessa Army
- Hungarian–Romanian War of 1919
- Rumcherod, the governing body of the Odessa Soviet Republic.
- Iona Yakir
- Iași–Don March

== Bibliography ==
- Smele, Jonathan D. (2015). "Odessa Soviet Republic". Historical Dictionary of the Russian Civil Wars, 1916-1926. Rowman & Littlefield Publishers. pp. 812–813. ISBN 978-1-4422-5281-3. LCCN 2015011566.
