= Văluță =

Văluţă is a Moldovan surname. Notable people with the surname include:

- Eduard Văluță (born 1979), Moldovan footballer
- Ion Văluță (1894–1981), Moldovan politician
