= Obreja (disambiguation) =

Obreja may refer to:

== Places ==
- Obreja, a commune in Caraş-Severin County, Romania
- Obreja, a village in Mihalț Commune, Alba County, Romania
- Obreja, a village in Stănești Commune, Gorj County, Romania
- Obreja Veche, a commune in Făleşti district, Moldova

== Persons ==
- Grigore Obreja (1967–2016), Romanian sprint canoeist
