= Mikhail Artemyevich Muravyov =

Russian general (1880–1918)

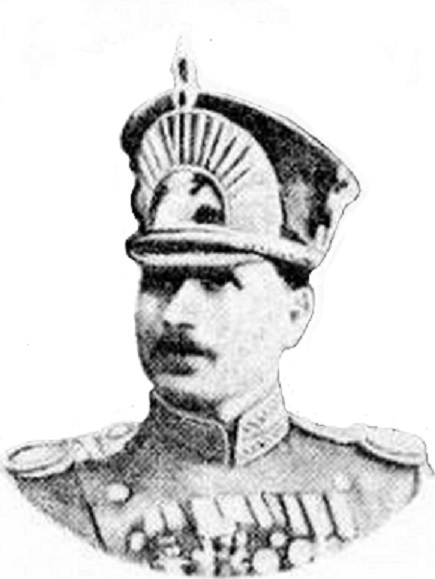
- Muravyov in 1916
- Born: September 25, 1880; Burdukovo, Kostroma Governorate, Russian Empire
- Died: July 11, 1918 (aged 37); Simbirsk, Russian SFSR
- Military career
- Allegiance: Russian Empire; Russian Republic; Russian SFSR
- Branch: Imperial Russian Army; Red Army
- Service years: 1904–1918
- Units: 122nd Tambov Infantry Regiment; 1st Neva Infantry Regiment
- Commands: Company of 122nd Tambov Infantry Regiment; Petrograd's Defense; Petrograd Military District; Armed forces against Kerensky; Chief of Staff for Antonov-Ovseyenko; Group of forces onto Kyiv; Armed forces of Odessa; Red Army Eastern Front; Simbirsk separatist forces
- Conflicts: Russo-Japanese War; World War I Russian Civil War

Mikhail Artemyevich Muravyov (Russian: Михаи́л Арте́мьевич Муравьёв) (25 September [O.S. 13 September] 1880 – July 11, 1918) was a Russian officer who changed sides during the time of the Civil War in Russia and the Soviet-Ukrainian war.

He was born in Burdukovo, a village near Vetluga in the Kostroma Governorate, to a peasant family. In 1898 he entered the army, serving in the Russo-Japanese War and World War I, in which he was a lieutenant colonel on the Southwestern Front.

After the February Revolution he organized volunteer units to continue the war, but he became disaffected with the Provisional Government and joined the Left Socialist-Revolutionaries. During the October Revolution he defended Petrograd against the forces of Alexander Kerensky.

In January 1918 he led Red Guard units against the Central Rada of Ukraine and after the Battle of Kruty his forces took Kyiv, where they carried out mass terror against the officers of the imperial army and pro-Ukrainian elements. Then his forces fought for the Odessa Soviet Republic against the Romanians and Austro-Hungarians, and in spring 1918 against the Don Cossack forces of General Kaledin.

However, after he had been named commander of the Eastern Front, fighting the Czechoslovak Legion, he heard of the Left SR uprising against the Bolsheviks in early July and rebelled, sailing down the Volga with a thousand men, hoping to take Simbirsk (Muravyov revolt). He was captured by the Bolsheviks, resisted arrest, and was shot while trying to draw a gun.

== Biography ==
=== Early years ===
Mikhail Muravyov was born into a peasant family. He studied at the Kostroma seminary. In 1898 he enlisted as a volunteer in the army. In 1901 he graduated from the two-year Kazan infantry cadet school, and after which he was sent to the city of Roslavl in the province of Smolensk. In that same year he distinguished himself in training exercises by capturing Aleksey Kuropatkin, the mock enemy commander.

=== Russo-Japanese War ===
In 1904, he commanded a company of the 122nd Tambov Regiment in the Russo-Japanese War. In February 1905, he was seriously wounded in the head.

He spent about five years abroad, primarily in France, where he attended the Paris Military Academy. In 1907, Muravyov fell under the influence of revolutionary ideas and joined Boris Savinkov's Socialist Revolutionary group.

On January 1, 1909 he served in the 1st Nevsky Infantry Regiment in the Caucasus. For seven years he served as a teacher at the Kazan Military School and married the daughter of the commander of the reserve Skopinsky infantry regiment.

=== World War I ===
At the beginning of World War I, after receiving a number of serious wounds at the front, he was transferred by a tactics teacher to the ensign school in Odessa.

=== February revolution ===
During the February Revolution, Muravyov was on the Southwestern Front. In March, he tried to oust the Governor of Odessa Ebelov for being "insufficiently revolutionary and a cadet."

In May, at the First Congress of the Southwestern Front (Kamianets-Podilskyi), he took the initiative to create volunteer strike units. In Petrograd, he headed the "Organizing Bureau of the All-Russian Central Committee for the Recruitment of Volunteers into Shock Units" (he was also the chairman of the "Central Executive Committee for the formation of the revolutionary army from volunteer rear services to continue the war with Germany"), and led the formation of volunteer shock battalions. In this field, Muravyov managed to form up to one hundred "death battalions" and several women's battalions. He was spotted by Alexander Kerensky, who appointed him chief of security of the Provisional Government, and promoted him to lieutenant colonel.

After the defeat of the Kornilov coup, he severed further relations with the Russian Provisional Government and joined the Left Socialist Revolutionaries, who actively criticized Kerensky.

=== October Revolution ===
Following the October Revolution, he offered his services to the Soviet government. Two days after the uprising in Petrograd, Muravyov met with Yakov Sverdlov and Lenin, after which he was authorized to organize a fight against marauders who had plundered the Petrograd wine shops.

On October 27, he became a member of the Revolutionary Military Committee and was elected the chief of defense of Petrograd. He was then appointed commander-in-chief of the troops of the Petrograd Military District, and then appointed commander of the troops operating against the forces of Kerensky-Krasnov. But on November 8 he announced his resignation from these positions, in connection with the withdrawal of the Left Socialist Revolutionaries from government posts.

=== In Ukraine and on the Romanian front ===
On December 6, 1917, the Council of People's Commissars formed the Southern Front to combat the counter-revolutionaries and Vladimir Antonov-Ovseyenko was appointed its commander in chief. Muravyov was appointed as Antonov-Ovseenko's chief of staff. Together with the commander of the troops of the Moscow military district, Nikolay Muralov, he formed Moscow Red Guard detachments to send against the troops of Alexey Kaledin. Kaledin was one of the inventors of the "echelon war" (railway warfare) tactics sometimes attributed to Muravyov himself. After the Southern Front entered Kharkiv, where the Congress of Soviets proclaimed Soviet power in Ukraine, Antonov-Ovseenko transferred the command of the troops operating in Ukraine to Muravyov, and he himself led the fight against the Don Cossack troops.

On January 4, 1918, the Soviet government of Ukraine officially declared war on the Central Council of Ukraine. General management of the operation was assigned to Muravyov. On January 6, Muravyov's troops entered Poltava. During the occupation of Poltava, Muravyov ordered the execution of 98 cadets and officers.

Four days after the troops of the Central Council suppressed the January uprising in Kyiv, Muravyov's troops entered the city, where a régime of Red Terror was established. During the storming of the city, massive shelling was carried out. As a result of the artillery barrages the Grushevsky apartment building was destroyed. Before the assault itself, on February 4, Muravyov ordered his troops: "to mercilessly destroy all officers, cadets, Haidamakas, monarchists and enemies of the revolution in Kiev".

Muravyov himself imposed an indemnity of five million rubles on the Kievan "bourgeoisie" for the maintenance of Soviet troops. According to the Ukrainian Red Cross, in the first days after the establishment of Muravyov's power in Kyiv, up to five thousand people were killed, of which up to three thousand were officers. It was one of the largest, if not the largest, massacres of Russian officers in the entire Civil War.

On January 27, Muravyov sent a report to Antonov-Ovseenko and Lenin on the capture of Kiev:

"Dear Vladimir Ilyich, I'm informing you that order has been restored in Kiev, the revolutionary power of the People's Secretariat, the Soviet of Workers and Peasants's Deputies and the Military Revolutionary Committee is working energetically. The disarmed city is gradually returning to normal, as it was before the bombing... I ordered the units of the 7th Army to cut the route of retreat - the remnants of the Central Council are making their way to Austria. I met representatives of the powers of England, France, the Czech Republic, Serbia, who all declared to me, as a representative of the Soviet government, their complete loyalty ... I ordered artillery to strike at high-rise and rich palaces, at churches and priests ... I burned down Grushevsky’s big house, and for three days it burned with a bright flame ..."

Victor A. Savchenko accompanied this statement by Muravyov with the following remark:

"Muravyov clearly bragged about his international activities, all the more so since the Czech Republic simply did not exist in February 1918, and Serbia was completely occupied by Austrian troops."

Muravyov was a staunch opponent of "Ukrainization" and his troops carried out mass repressions against the Ukrainian intelligentsia, officers, and bourgeoisie, to the point that it even became dangerous to speak Ukrainian in the streets. The People's Secretariat of Ukraine, which had moved to Kyiv from Kharkiv, demanded the removal of Muravyov from the city, calling him "the leader of the bandits".

On February 14, Muravyov was appointed commander of the front, having received the task of opposing the Romanian forces seeking to seize Bessarabia and Transnistria. In his telegram, Lenin demanded from Muravyov: "Act as energetically as possible on the Romanian front". In response, Muravyov reported:

"The situation is extremely serious. The troops of the former front are disorganized, in reality there is no front, only headquarters remain, the location of which have not been clarified. The hope is only for reinforcements from outside. The Odessa proletariat is disorganized and politically illiterate. Ignoring the fact that the enemy is approaching Odessa, they do not think to worry. The attitude to the matter is very cold - typical of the Odesites."

On March 9, he established military revolutionary tribunals in the controlled territory. Muravyov commanded the troops of the Odessa Soviet Republic until March 12, but could not hold the city. After leaving Odessa on March 11–12, he ordered the ground units and ships of the navy of the Odessa Soviet Republic "to open fire with all guns at the bourgeois and nationalist parts of the city and destroy it".

On April 1, having abandoned his troops, Muravyov arrived in Moscow. Lenin, on the initiative of Antonov-Ovseenko, offered him the post of commander of the Caucasian Soviet Army, but the local Bolsheviks, headed by the chairman of the Baku Council of People's Commissars Stepan Shaumian, very sharply opposed such a candidate.

In mid-April, in parallel with the suppression of the anarchists in Moscow, Muravyov was arrested on charges of abuse of power and connections with the anarchists; the commission of inquiry did not confirm the charge, and by a decree of the Presidium of the All-Russian Central Executive Committee, the case was dismissed "for the lack of corpus delicti". Muravyov himself, being in Odessa, described his "exploits" in Kyiv as follows:

"We were establishing Soviet power by fire and sword. I took the city, destroyed the palaces and churches ... giving no mercy to anyone! ... Hundreds of generals, maybe thousands, were ruthlessly killed ... We took revenge. We could stop the anger of revenge, but we did not do it because our aim was to be merciless!"

=== Rebellion and death ===
On June 13, Muravyov was appointed commander of the Eastern Front. The German ambassador Wilhelm von Mirbach, wanting to motivate Muravyov to join the Bolsheviks in the fight against the Czechoslovak Legion, handed him a bribe. However, this did not prevent him from rebelling against the Bolsheviks.

During the Left SR uprising, Lenin began to doubt Muravyov’s loyalty, ordering the Revolutionary Military Council of the eastern front to secretly monitor his actions: "Report Muravyov’s statement about the rebellion of the Left Socialist Revolutionaries. Continue close monitoring". Muravyov rebelled, having received news from Moscow and fearing arrest due to Bolshevik suspicions of disloyalty. Muravyov himself, during the events, declared that he "acted independently, but the Left SR Central Committee knows everything." On the night of July 9–10, Muravyov, having left the front headquarters in Kazan, without the knowledge of the military council of the front, loaded two regiments loyal to him onto steamers and left the city. He even managed to transfer the local communist squad from Simbirsk to Bugulma by order of the front.

He opposed the conclusion of the Brest-Litovsk Treaty with Germany, declared himself "commander in chief of the army operating against Germany", and sent a telegraph to the Council of People's Commissars of the RSFSR, the German embassy in Moscow and the command of the Czechoslovak Legion, declaring war on Germany. The troops of the front and the Czechoslovak Legion (with which he had to fight before the rebellion) were ordered to move to the Volga and further west to repulse the German invasion. He took the initiative to create the so-called Volga Soviet Republic led by the Left Socialist Revolutionaries Maria Spiridonova, Boris Kamkov and Vladimir Karelin.

In a joint government appeal, Lenin and Trotsky stated that "The former commander-in-chief on the Czech-Slovak front, the left Socialist Revolutionary Muravyov, is declared a traitor and an enemy of the people. Every honest citizen is obliged to shoot him on the spot".

On July 11, Muravyov, with a detachment of a thousand people, arrived at Simbirsk, occupied strategic points of the city and arrested leading Bolsheviks, including the commander of the 1st Army Mikhail Tukhachevsky. Muravyov appeared at a meeting of the executive committee of the provincial Council, together with representatives of the Left Socialist Revolutionaries. At that time, the local Left SRs were not yet removed from power and held the posts of military, land and food provincial commissars. By this time, the chairman of the local Bolshevik party committee had managed to secretly place Latvian Riflemen, an armored squad and a special detachment of the Cheka around the building. During the meeting, the Red Guards and the Cheka came out from the ambush and announced the arrest of everyone in the building. Muravyov put up armed resistance and was killed in the fighting.
