= Ernest Broșteanu =

Romanian general (1869–1932)

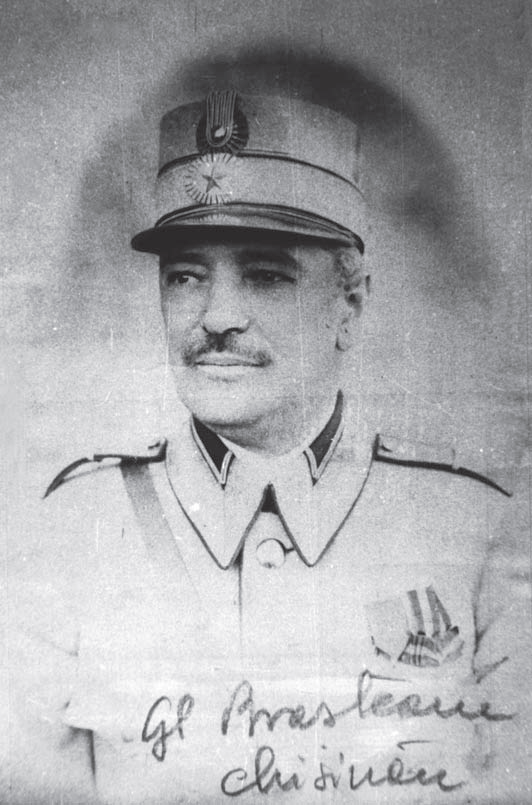
- Broșteanu in 1917
- Born: 24 January 1869; Roman, Kingdom of Romania
- Died: 6 June 1932 (aged 63); Bucharest, Kingdom of Romania
- Education: Higher War School
- Spouses: Maria Carp (m. 1894–1897) Olga A. Duca (m. 1898)
- Children: Ernest Broșteanu; Radu Pavel Broșteanu
- Military career
- Allegiance: Romanian Army
- Branch: Infantry
- Service years: 1888–1930
- Rank: Sublocotenent (1890); Locotenent (1894); Căpitan (1900); Maior (1909); Locotenent-colonel (1913); Colonel (1916); General de brigadă (1917); General de divizie (1919)
- Units: 53rd Infantry Regiment; 11th Infantry Division
- Conflicts: Second Balkan War; World War I; Russian Civil War; Intervention in Bessarabia
- Awards: Order of the Crown (Romania), Officer rank Order of Michael the Brave, 3rd Class; Order of Saint Stanislaus (House of Romanov), 1st class Legion of Honour, Knight class

Ernest Broșteanu (January 24, 1869 – June 6, 1932) was a Romanian general during World War I, best known for his leading role in the 1918 Romanian military intervention in Bessarabia.

== Early life ==
He was born on January 24, 1869, in Roman, Neamț County, in the historic region of Moldavia, Kingdom of Romania. On November 3, 1894, he married Maria Carp, whom he divorced almost three years later, on May 10, 1897. On July 12, 1898, he married Olga A. Duca, by whom he had two sons: Ernest and Radu Pavel.

== Military career ==
From July 1888 to July 1890 he attended the Infantry and Cavalry Military School in Bucharest, graduating with the rank of second lieutenant. Promoted to lieutenant in February 1894, he attended the Higher War School in Bucharest from 1898 to 1900, after which he advanced in rank to captain (April 1900), major (April 1909), and lieutenant colonel (April 1913). In 1910 he was awarded the Order of the Crown, Officer rank. From 1911 to 1916 he was the commandant of the Military High School in Iași, while in 1913 he participated in the Second Balkan War. In 1914 he received the Medal of the Country’s Upsurge, and in April 1916 he was made colonel.

After Romania entered World War I in August 1916, Broșteanu was awarded the Order of Michael the Brave, 3rd Class, for the way he led the 53rd Infantry Regiment during the Dobruja campaign in September–October 1916, being one of the twelve officers who were awarded the order for the first time:

Having been dispatched by the divisional commander to maneuver to the left of the 2nd Division with his regiment, he knew how to ardently inspire the soldiers so that they proceeded singing to the assault. He was wounded while leading his regiment on September 3, 1916, during fighting south of Arabagi, Dobruja. High Decree No. 2970, September 28, 1916

Promoted to brigadier general in April 1917, he was given the command of the 11th Infantry Division, which saw combat in the Battle of Mărășești in August 1917. In September 1917 he was awarded the Russian Order of Saint Stanislaus, 1st class. He also received the French Legion of Honour, Knight class.

In early January 1918, after the Armistice of Focșani, Broșteanu and his division were ordered to cross the Prut into the Moldavian Democratic Republic in order to pacify the region, which was under the threat of brigandage perpetrated by Soviet soldiers. In mid-January he entered Chișinău with the 11th Infantry Division, leading the Bolshevik units and their local supporters to leave the city, towards Bender (Tighina), on the Dniester River. By the beginning of February, Broșteanu's troops defeated the remaining Soviet units in Tighina, forcing them to retreat across the Dniester. In March he was replaced by Ioan Rășcanu (his classmate at the Higher War School) as commander of the Romanian troops in Chișinău and central Bessarabia.

In April 1919, Broșteanu advanced in rank to major general. After the war, he filled several key positions in the Army, such as commander of the Border Guards Corps (1922–1929) and General-Inspector of the Infantry (1929–1930). He retired from active duty on October 1, 1930, and died in Bucharest in 1932.

== Legacy ==
A street in the Dorobanți neighborhood of Bucharest where his house used to be (the house was demolished in 2005) now bears his name, and so does a street in Strehaia.

== Gallery ==
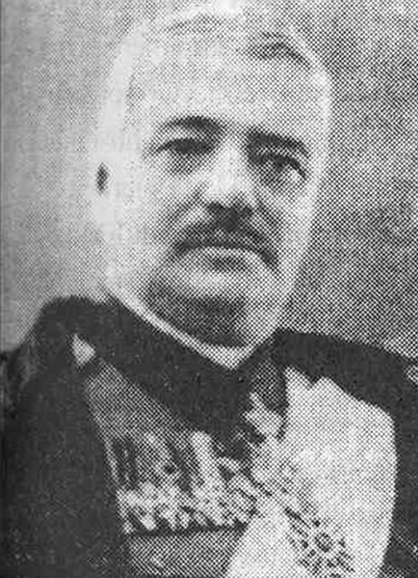
General Ernest Broșteanu (1916)

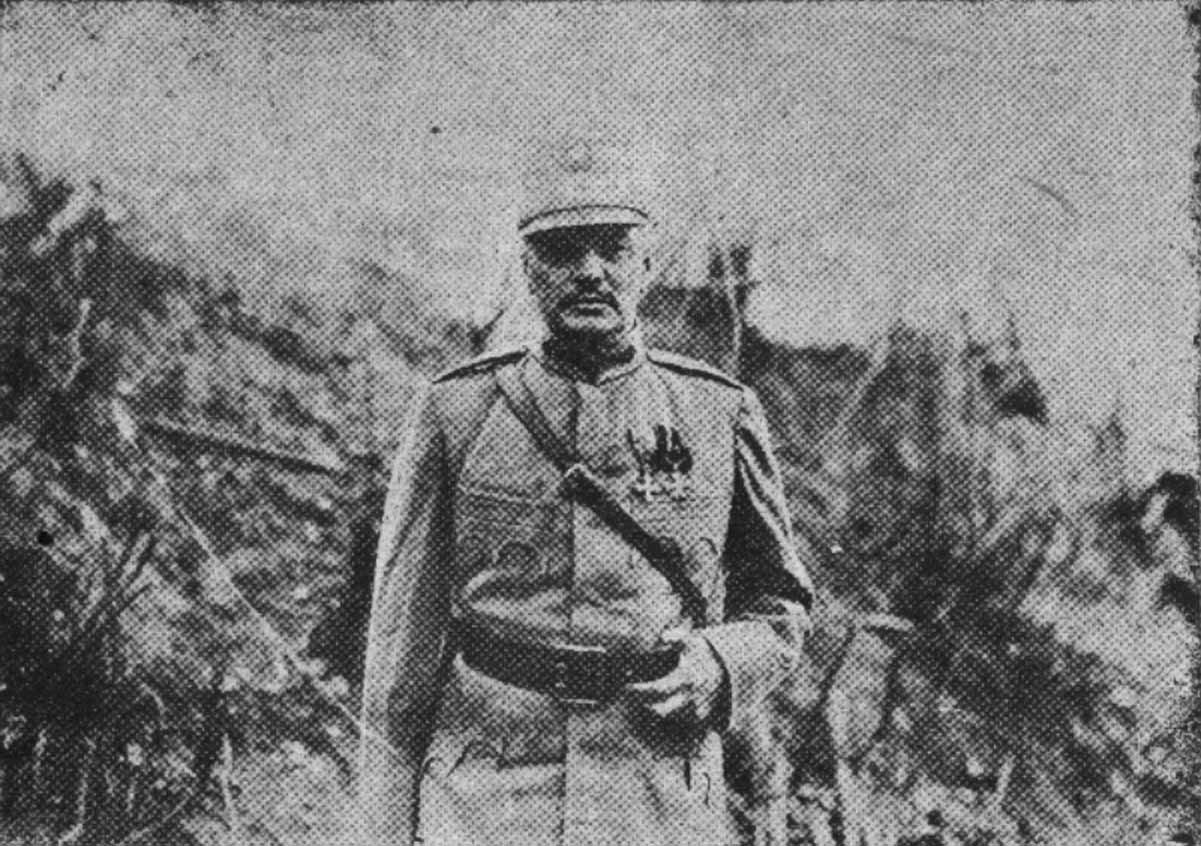
General Ernest Broșteanu in Bessarabia (1918)
