= Iona Yakir =

Soviet military commander (1896–1937)

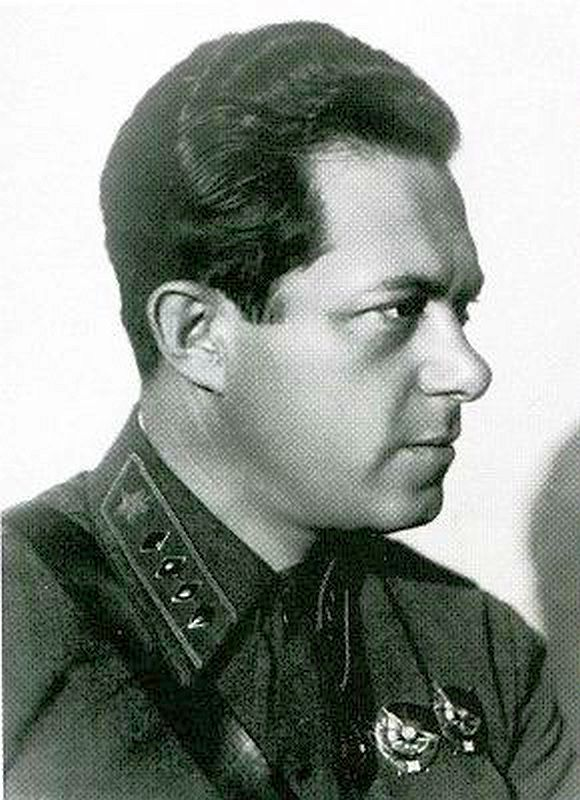
- Born: Iona Emmanuilovich Yakir; 3 August 1896; Kishinev, Bessarabia Governorate, Russian Empire
- Died: 12 June 1937 (aged 40); Moscow, Russian SFSR, Soviet Union
- Education: University of Basel
- Military career
- Allegiance: (Russian Soviet Federative Socialist Republic) Russian SFSR; Soviet Union
- Branch: Red Army
- Service years: 1918–1937
- Rank: Komandarm 1st rank
- Units: 45th Rifle Division, 58th Rifle Division, Ukrainian Military District, Kiev Military District, Leningrad Military District
- Commands: Ukrainian Military District, Kiev Military District, Leningrad Military District
- Conflicts: Russian Civil War; Polish–Soviet War: Kiev operation of the RKKA
- Awards: Order of the Red Banner (three times)

Signature
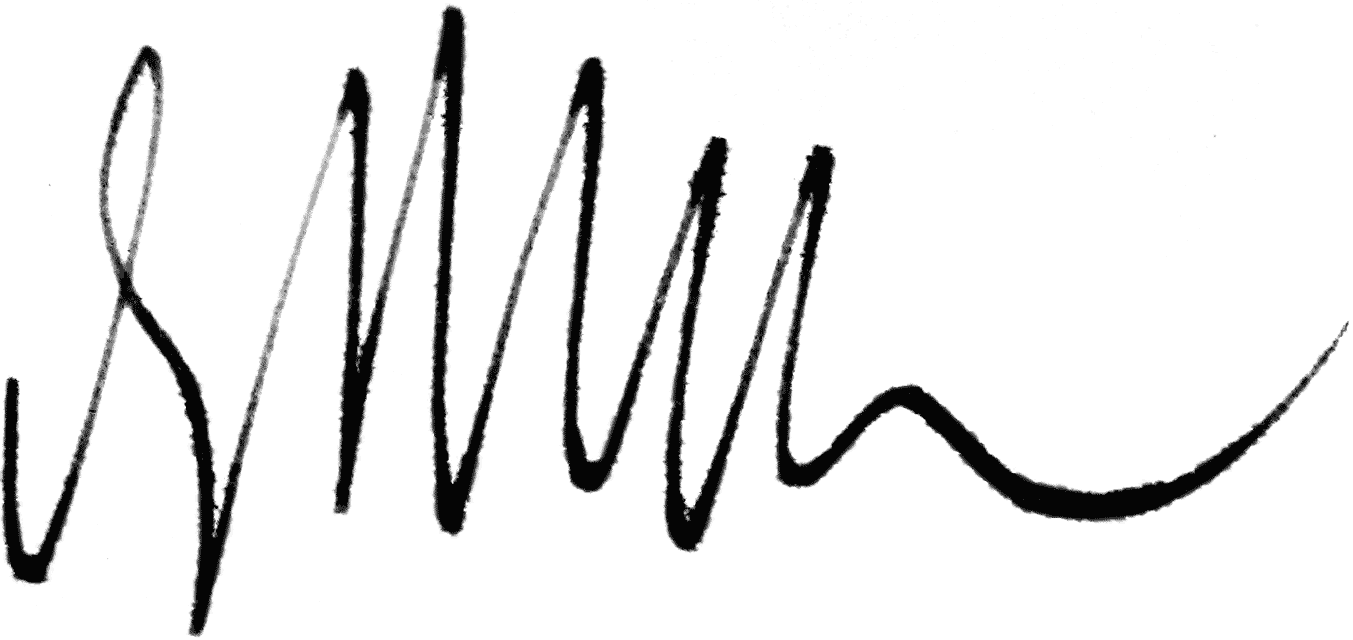

Iona Emmanuilovich Yakir (Russian: Ио́на Эммануи́лович Яки́р; 3 August 1896 – 12 June 1937) was a Red Army commander and one of the world's major military reformers between World War I and World War II. He was an early and major military victim of the Great Purge, alongside Mikhail Tukhachevsky.

== Early years ==
Born in Kishinev, Bessarabia, Russian Empire, into the prosperous family of a Jewish pharmacist, Yakir graduated from the local secondary school in 1914. Because of Imperial Russian governmental restrictions on Jews' access to higher education, Yakir studied abroad at the University of Basel in Switzerland, in the field of chemistry. After the outbreak of World War I (1914), he returned to the Russian Empire and worked as a turner in a military factory in Odessa (he was a reservist). From 1915 to 1917, he attended the Kharkov Technological Institute. Affected by the war, he became a follower of Vladimir Lenin. In 1917, he returned to Kishinev, and in April became a member of the Bolshevik Party. He also became a member of the Bessarabian Governorate's Council, the Governorate's Committee, and the Revolutionary Committee. From January 1918, he took an active part in the Bolshevik seizure of power in Bessarabia. When Romania intervened to recapture Bessarabia, Yakir led Bolshevik resistance, but the regular Romanian army overwhelmed his small force.

== In the Civil War ==
Yakir retreated to Ukraine and fought against Austro-Hungarian occupation forces as a commander of a Chinese regiment of the Red Army. He was severely wounded in March 1918 near Ekaterinoslav. At the beginning of the Russian Civil War between Bolshevik forces, the White Army and various other anti-Bolshevik movements, Yakir was a member of the Bolshevik Party in Voronezh Province and started his service in the Red Army as a commissar. He showed military talent and was assigned as a field commander. In October 1918, he served as a member of the Revolutionary Council of the 8th Army in the Southern Front and simultaneously commanded the Southern Front's several key formations in operations against the Don Cossacks of Pyotr Krasnov. He carried out Lenin's order of persecution against the Cossack civilians and the extermination of almost half of the male Cossack population. The war against armed combatants plus the terror against the civilians were coming together in the Russian Civil War. Encouraged by the Bolshevik theory of class struggle, Yakir, like other members of the Communist party, took part in terror. For his services, he became the second individual (after Vasily Blyukher) to receive the highest Soviet military award of that time, the Order of the Red Banner (engraved as No. 2).

In the summer of 1919, Yakir was sent to Ukraine to command the 45th Rifle Division, and in August 1919, he became the commander of the Southern Group of the 12th Army, which included the 45th and 58th Rifle Divisions. Both divisions were surrounded in Odessa by the White forces. Yakir undertook one of the most unusual Civil War military operations. He breached the encirclement and led his forces through the enemy rear for a distance of 400 kilometres (250 mi) to join the Red Army in Zhitomir. Like other Bolshevik commanders who did not have military education he was assisted in this operation by former tsarist army officers on his staff but this fact does not negate his own role in planning and leading the campaign. For this campaign he received his second Order of the Red Banner, and both of his divisions received Red Banners of Honor. Yakir took part in actions against the White forces of Nikolai Yudenich in defense of Petrograd, in suppression of Ukrainian anarchist guerrilla forces of Nestor Makhno, and in the Polish–Soviet War. He was awarded the Order of the Red Banner three times (twice in 1919 and once in 1930), and he became one of the most-decorated Red Army commanders.

== Military reform ==
After the civil war, Yakir commanded army formations in Ukraine. Yakir was a close associate of Mikhail Frunze and belonged to his inner circle of innovative Red Army officers who assisted Frunze in starting far-reaching military reforms. Among these reformers, Mikhail Tukhachevsky became a friend of Yakir. In April 1924 Yakir was appointed a head of the Main Directorate of Military Academies of the Red Army and simultaneously editor of a major military periodical devoted to development of military theory, Voennyi Vestnik.

In November 1925, after Frunze's death, Yakir was appointed commander of the most powerful territorial formations of the Red Army, the newly reorganized Ukrainian Military District (see: Kiev Military District). Yakir, in close coordination with Tukhachevsky and other reformers, made his district into a laboratory for wide-ranging experiments in strategy, tactical and operational techniques, army formations and equipment. In training his troops, Yakir encouraged his officers' initiative and ability to make their own judgments. In 1928 and 1929, Yakir studied at the Higher Military Academy (German: Führergehilfenausbildung) in Berlin. This was possible because of the intensive military cooperation between the Soviet Union and Germany. Yakir's innovative approaches to the military art impressed his German colleagues. German Field Marshal of World War I fame Paul von Hindenburg praised him as one of the most-talented military commanders of the post-World War I era. Following repeated requests from German officers, Yakir gave special lectures on the Russian Civil War.

After returning to his district, Yakir continued military reforms. He was one of the creators of the first large tank and air-force formations in the world. Not a military theorist in his own right, Yakir strongly supported Tukhachevsky's endeavor in developing the theory of deep operations. Military historians across the world still consider this theory an outstanding theoretical innovation. In 1934 Yakir requested that Tukhachevsky be appointed to conduct advanced courses on operational theory for high-ranking officers of the Red Army General Staff and commanders of military districts. He made this request even though he knew about Joseph Stalin's dislike of Tukhachevsky. In retribution, Stalin instructed Kliment Voroshilov, the Peoples Commissar of Defense, to bar Yakir from membership in the prestigious Advisory Council of the Defense Commissariat. In 1935, in order to diminish Yakir's power, the Ukrainian Military District was divided into two new districts: Kiev, under Yakir's command, and Kharkov.

In September 1935 Yakir conducted major military maneuvers in Kiev with the Kiev and Kharkov Military Districts' forces. The event resulted in several cover-page articles in the Defense Comissariat's official journal, Krasnaya Zvezda (Red Star). Most importantly, these maneuvers aimed to test the theory of deep operations and the latest technology. A total of 65,000 troops, including 1,888 paratroopers, with 1,200 tanks and 600 aircraft participated in these maneuvers. These were the first maneuvers in the world that used combined operations of large tank, air-force, and airborne formations. The troops acted along a front of 250 kilometres (160 mi) with a depth of 200 kilometres (120 mi). Representatives of major world armies attended the maneuvers. French general Lucien Loizeau made very favorable comments about the technical and moral readiness of the Red Army. The German Wehrmacht copied Soviet innovations in the years before World War II. The reforms — started by Frunze, and continued by Yakir, Tukhachevsky and many other commanders — made the Red Army into one of the most advanced armies in the world. During these years, Yakir regularly gave lectures to the Red Army General Staff Academy, informing the students about the newest developments in military affairs; his students considered him an excellent speaker and tutor.

In 1935 he was promoted to Komandarm 1st rank, the second-highest military rank in the Soviet Union at the time.

== Political involvements ==
Stalin, who was consolidating his power over the country, approved Yakir's appointment to the Ukrainian Military District in 1925. However, he did not trust him fully and instructed his political ally Lazar Kaganovich to become friends with Yakir and to report about his activities. Yakir, who was a firm believer in the Communist cause, was actively involved in internal politics. He was member of the party Central Committee in Moscow and member of the Politburo of the Communist Party of Ukraine. While ingenious and independent in his thinking as a military commander, in Soviet politics he was a docile party member and followed the Stalinist line. As a party member, he lacked the power of conviction and independent thinking to defy Stalin.

His blind obedience did not spare him. Stalin would not allow to his military commanders any independent thinking — he was paranoid of a coup plot. While Stalin's attitude toward Yakir was apparently friendly, the leader could not tolerate him. Starting with the Great Purge in 1936, the NKVD arrested many close associates and subordinates of Yakir. (This method became an NKVD routine in the course of the purges: this way they were able to create a professional and private vacuum around the target person.) Yakir was one of few top Soviet commanders who appealed to Stalin, even travelled to Moscow and tried to convince Voroshilov in person, claiming the innocence of these officers. However, Yakir's appeals (and his other reactions) were a clear sign of his disagreement with the ongoing purges which alienated Stalin even more.

== Arrest, trial and death ==
On 10 and 11 May 1937, the Red Army was shaken up by several major personnel changes. Marshal Tukhachevsky was discharged from his position as a deputy commissar and was sent to command the Volga Military District which had little military importance. At the same time, Yakir was also sent to a different post: from Kiev to Leningrad. Unlike Tukhachevsky, it wasn't an obvious demotion. Tukhachevsky was arrested on the way to his new post on 22 May. Yakir attended a conference in the Kiev Military District when he heard the news. His mood changed dramatically afterwards — normally he was cheerful, friendly, making jokes. This shift was attributed to his transfer to Leningrad.

On 31 May 1937, the NKVD arrested Yakir, and transported him to the Lubyanka Prison in Moscow. He and seven other major military commanders (Robert Eideman, Boris Feldman, Avgust Kork, Vitaly Primakov, Vitovt Putna, Mikhail Tukhachevsky, and Ieronim Uborevich) were accused of being members of the alleged Trotskyist Anti-Soviet Military Organization and of being Nazi agents. Except for Feldman, who was cooperative, all of them got brutally tortured. Yakir (until they broke him) maintained his innocence, both in correspondence to Joseph Stalin and at his trial on 11 June. Although he generally admitted taking part in a conspiracy, he denied being a spy. During the trial he was asked to provide further details about his written confession but he stated that he couldn't add anything more. One of his last letters to Stalin is really moving. Stalin and other members of the Politburo made the following cynical comments on this, creating a written conversation: "Rascal and prostitute" (Stalin). Kliment Voroshilov and Vyacheslav Molotov added: "A perfectly accurate definition". Lazar Kaganovich finally wrote: "The only punishment for the scoundrel, riffraff and whore is the death penalty".

Yakir and the other seven commanders were executed in Moscow, virtually right after their trial at the dawn of 12 June 1937, without even reading their appeals. The man who performed their execution was Vasily Blokhin, the chief executioner of the NKVD. The corpses were cremated on site, and the ashes were thrown into a mass grave dug at the Donskoye Cemetery. Members of the Yakir family were either immediately executed, like his younger brother, Moris Emmanuilovich (1902–1937), or sent to Gulag labor camps: Yakir's younger sister, Isabella Emmanuilovna (1900–1986) served there 10 years while his wife, Sarra Lazarevna (1900–1971) and his then-14-year-old son, Pyotr Ionavich (1923–1982), spent almost 20 years there. Yakir's military writings were banned. Additionally, to morally finish the generals, newspapers dubbed them "treasonous", and published articles approving their execution, with the signatures of well-known Soviet artists — no matter if they in fact signed these articles or not (among those that refused was Boris Pasternak).

== Legacy ==
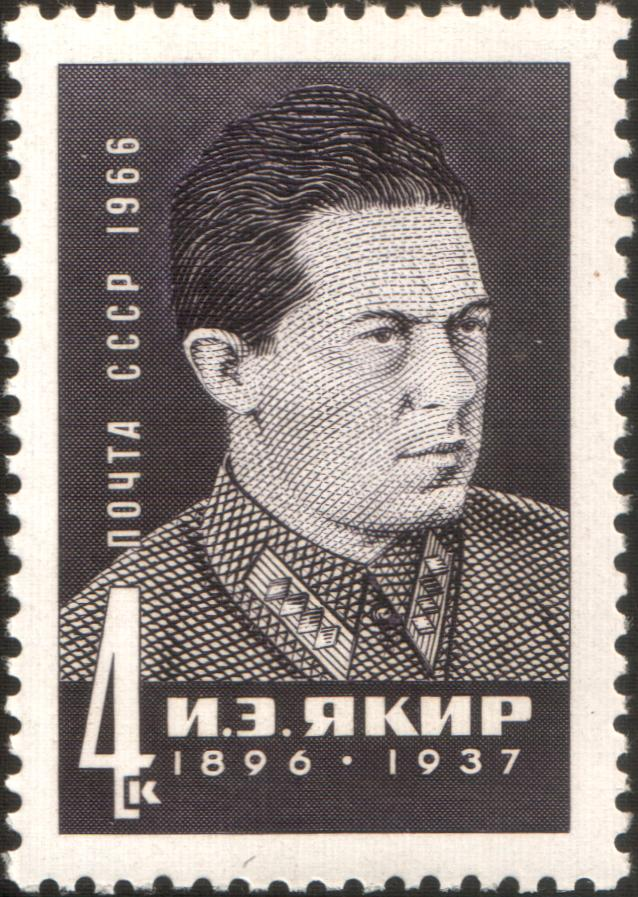
1966 USSR stamp of Yakir

Opinions on Yakir are mixed, even today. As a young Civil War commander, he is thought to have used excessive force and violence (flamethrowers, machine guns) against civilian members of the resistance as well as the Cossack population, and was also involved in requisition. Later, during the years of agricultural collectivization, he launched what are alleged as punitive raids against starving peasants. It is the opinion of many that he was personally liable for the great famine in Ukraine between 1932 and 1933. He also had other characteristics translated as vices by the puritan Stalin: Yakir never made a secret of his luxurious Kiev lifestyle (he lived in one of the palaces of the Mezhyhirya Residence), and he also lent dachas for profit and never ceased his involvement in trading.

But as a military reformer, Yakir was dedicated and remarkable. He worked on the improvement of the Red Army until his demise. On 10 June 1937, only 2 days before his execution, he wrote an extensive letter to Nikolai Yezhov, head of the NKVD, about his observations and the important duties in the field of military. After his death, Stalin's Great Purge wiped out large number of the officers who had served under him. Many of Yakir's achievements, including his reforms and preparations for guerrilla activities in the event of an invasion of Ukraine, were dismantled. When Germany invaded the Soviet Union in June 1941, the Red Army was largely incapable of modern warfare and unprepared to face an enemy who used military art which Yakir and other Soviet innovators were greatly familiar with. The Soviets suffered terrible defeats and huge human and territorial losses before remastering modern operational approaches and tactics. Yakir's disciples who survived the purge used the experiences which they had gained under Yakir to make a vital contribution to Soviet victory over Germany. Among them were Chief of the General Staff of the Red Army Aleksei Antonov, Front commanders Andrei Yeremenko and Ivan Chernyakhovsky, and Army commander Alexander Gorbatov.

During Nikita Khrushchev's de-Stalinisation, Yakir was rehabilitated on 31 January 1957. His cenotaph is in the Vvedenskoye Cemetery in Moscow.

== See also ==
- Outline of the Russian Revolution and Civil War
- Bibliography of the Russian Revolution and Civil War
- Bibliography of Stalinism and the Soviet Union
- Index of Old Bolsheviks
- Index of articles related to the Russian Revolution and Civil War
- Anatolie Popa
- Grigory Kotovsky
- Gherman Pântea
- Boris Kamkov
