= Pogănești, Hîncești =

Pogănești
- Commune
- Location in Moldova
- Coordinates: 46°42′N 28°14′E
- Country: Moldova
- District: Hîncești District

Population (2014)
  - Total: 1,336
- Time zone: UTC+2 (EET)
  - Summer (DST): UTC+3 (EEST)

Pogănești is the village of residence of the commune of the same name in Hîncești District, Moldova. It is composed of two villages, Marchet and Pogănești.
