= Ion Văluță =

Bessarabian politician (1894–1981)

Ion Văluţă
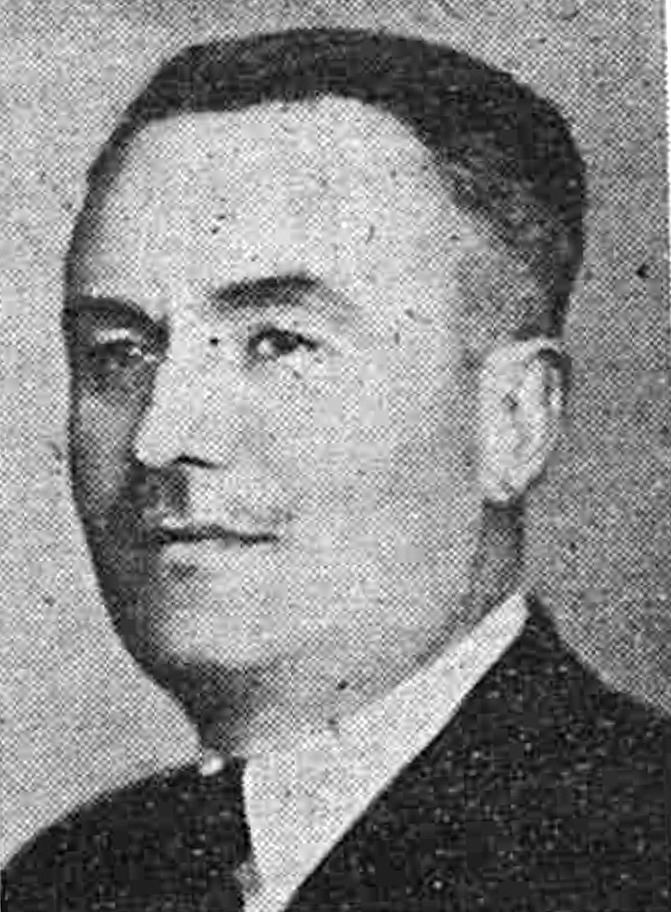
- Ion Văluță in 1938

Member of the Moldovan Parliament
- In office 1917–1918

Personal details
- Born: 1 May 1894 Obreja Veche
- Died: 1981 Bucharest
- Resting place: Slatina
- Party: National Liberal Party; National Liberal Party-Brătianu

Ion Văluţă (1 May 1894 in Obreja Veche – 1981 in Bucharest) was a Bessarabian politician.

== Biography ==
He served as Member of the Moldovan Parliament (1917–1918).

== Education ==
He graduated from High School Number 1 B.P. Hasdeu from Chișinău. He studied law at the Universities of Petrograd and Odessa. During the interwar period he was 5 times a member of Parliament representing the Brătianu National Liberal Party.

== Political activity ==
He organized the student society "Renaissance" in Balti, Bolhrad and Chișinău. He contributed to the introduction of Romanian language courses and the history of Romanians at the University of Odessa.

He was a member of the Country Council delegated by the National Committee of Officers, Soldiers and Students of Odessa. On 27 March 1918 he voted for the Union of Bessarabia with the Motherland. He has been a parliamentarian five times. In 1923 he was director of Industry and Commerce in Bessarabia. He was sent on a special mission by the Vaida government to Warsaw. He was several times a member of the Agricultural Chambers, of the County and Communal Council of Chisinau.

He was three times president of the Chisinau Chamber of Commerce and Industry. In this capacity he created the federation of all the Chambers of Commerce of Bessarabia and was elected its president.

He was vice-president of the Union of Chambers of Commerce and Industry of Romania, working for the restoration of Bessarabian trade and agriculture. He pointed out the shortcomings of the Bessarabian media. He managed to merge all credit unions in Bessarabia, creating a single credit institution for Bessarabian farmers.

== Publishing activity ==
He published the magazine "Economic Bessarabia".

== Gallery ==
Moldovan stamp, 1998

== Notes ==
Media related to Ion Văluță at Wikimedia Commons
