= Rumcherod =

1917–1918 Soviet polity in Eastern Europe

The Rumcherod (Russian: Румчерод) was a short-lived organ of Soviet power in the South-Western part of Russian Empire that functioned during May 1917–May 1918. The name stands as the Russian language abbreviation for its full name Central Executive Committee of the Soviets of the Romanian Front, Black Sea Fleet, and Odessa Oblast (Russian: Румынского фронта, Черноморского флота и Одесской области).

Odessa Oblast in that instance meant the territory of the Odessa Military District of the Russian Empire. During that period of time the Russian Odessa Military District (Odessa MD) before being overrun by Soviets included the following guberniyas: Kherson Governorate, Bessarabia guberniya, Taurida Governorate, and parts of Podolia Governorate and Volyn Governorate.

== Overview ==
Rumcherod was created at the 1st Congress of Front and Oblast Soviets in Odessa (May 23–June 9, 1917). The majority in that first meeting consisted of Mensheviks and Esers, who supported the Russian Provisional Government and the continuation of the war to the very end. Their position was against Bolsheviks and their October Revolution. On the order of Nikolai Krylenko who performed functions of the Chief Commander of Sovnarkom Rumcherod was forced to be dissolved.

On 23 December 1917 through 5 January 1918 in Odessa the Soviets organized congress of Soviets that elected the new Rumcherod consisting of 180 people. The composition of the second Rumcherod was 70 Bolsheviks, 55 left Esers, 23 representatives of peasant organizations, and 32 from other parties. The committee recognized the Soviet government and approved its policy. V.Volodarsky attended the congress as the representative of the Soviet government and the Central Committee of Russian Social Democratic Labour Party (Bolsheviks) (RSDLP(b)). The former member of the Petrograd committee of RSDLP(b) Vladimir Yudovsky was elected the Chairman of Rumcherod which served as the highest authority for the Odessa Soviet Republic.

From January to March 1918 the Rumcherod militarily supported the pro-Soviet forces in the Moldavian Democratic Republic, and later opposed the troops sent into the region by Romania. Later the Soviet republic was forced to comply with the conditions of the Treaty of Brest-Litovsk and withdraw due to the advance of Austro-German forces first to Nikolayev, then to Rostov-on-Don and Yeysk. In May 1918 it was dissolved, with its chairman Yudovsky relocated to Moscow.
