= Moara de Piatră =

- Village
- Location within Moldova
- Coordinates: 47.8933333333°N 28.0052777778°E
- Country: Moldova
- District: Drochia District

Government
  - Mayor: Valentina Bejenaru (PLDM)

Population (2014 census)
  - Total: 1,300
- Time zone: UTC+2 (EET)
  - Summer (DST): UTC+3 (EEST)

Moara de Piatră is a village in Drochia District, Moldova. At the 2004 census, the commune had 1,659 inhabitants.
