= Victor A. Savchenko =

Ukrainian writer and historian

Victor A. Savchenko (Ukrainian: Савченко, Виктор Анатольевич), born December 13, 1961, in Odessa in the then Ukrainian Soviet Socialist Republic, is a writer and historian.

== Biography ==
In 1985 he graduated from the Faculty of History, University of Odessa. In 1990 he defended his thesis on the history of the anarchist movement in Ukraine in 1917-1921. One of his first articles "Treason, Makhno and the iron broom L. Trotsky" (History of the USSR. - Moscow, 1990. - 2. - S. 75-90) marked the beginning of rehabilitation of Nestor Makhno in historical scholarship and public consciousness.

Since 1985, Savchenko has taught history and sociology at universities in Odessa. In 1995-1996 he worked at the Ukrainian Institute. Shevchenko (Paris) Associate Professor of the Odessa University of Internal Affairs and professor of sociology (2002).

He became the head of the Odessa organization All-Ukrainian Party "Cathedral" (2000-2001), the All-Ukrainian Party of Peace and Unity (since 2002, deputy chairman of the party since 2006). He was nominated to the Supreme Rada (1995) and worked in political PR.

As a public figure, Savchenko leads the "Association of European culture" (2000) and scientific Local History Society "Odessika" (since 2009). Since 1990, Savchenko has been working in the field of journalism.

He authored 320 articles that were published in the Weekly Peak Politics and Culture (Kiev), Passage Alliance (Odessa) and others in the newspaper Russian idea (Paris), Ukrains'ke word (Paris), Bulletin of the region, South, Word, Chernomorsk News, Porto-Franco (Odessa) and others is the co-author of the modern coat of arms of Odessa (1999).

He edits the literary anthology Southwestern ART and is the chief editor of a history and local lore scientific almanac" In 2000, Savchenko began his writing career as a publicist.

He is a member of the Writer's Union of Ukraine.

== Works ==
Savchenko authored or co-authored 19 books:

=== Screenplays and Consultant on historical issues, TV films ===
- "Who killed Kotovs'kogo" (RTR, 2004),
- "Skoropadsky", "Adventurers of the Civil War", "Kotovsky", "as was done in Odessa" ( Channel 5, Russia)
- "Legends of the gangster Odessa" 48 episodes (NTN, 2008),
- Painter teleser ala "Kill Stalin (UMG, 2009).
- "We Poshuk істини (Kotovsky, Jap, Блюмкін, Рейлі, Ostap Bender) (STB. 2007-2009)
- "Labyrinths of History" (URA - Studio, Odessa, 2009)
- "Makhno" (UT-1. 2008)
