= Obreja Veche =

- Commune
- Location in Moldova
- Coordinates: 47°40′N 27°39′E
- Country: Moldova
- District: Fălești District

Population (2014)
  - Total: 2,367
- Time zone: UTC+2 (EET)
  - Summer (DST): UTC+3 (EEST)

Obreja Veche is a commune in Fălești District, Moldova. It is composed of two villages, Obreja Nouă and Obreja Veche.

== Notable people ==
- Ion Văluță
