= Ștefan Ciobanu =

Moldovan politician and historian (1883–1950)

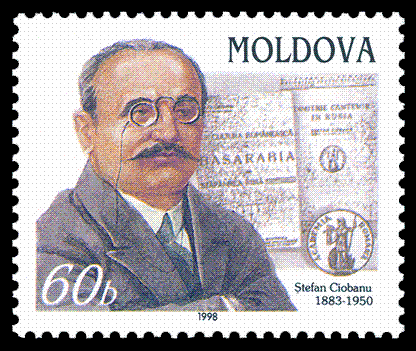
- 1998 stamp of Moldova

Minister of Education of the Moldavian Democratic Republic
- In office 1917–1918
- President: Ion Inculeț
- Prime Minister: Pantelimon Erhan; Daniel Ciugureanu; Petru Cazacu

Minister of Culture of Romania
- In office 11 May 1940 – 28 June 1940
- Monarch: Carol II of Romania
- Prime Minister: Gheorghe Tătărăscu
- Preceded by: Ion Nistor
- Succeeded by: Constantin C. Giurescu

Member of the Senate of Romania
- In office 1939–1940

Personal details
- Born: 11 November 1883 Talmaza, Bessarabia Governorate, Russian Empire
- Died: 28 February 1950 (aged 66) Bucharest, Romanian People's Republic
- Resting place: Drobeta Turnu Severin, Romania
- Party: National Renaissance Front
- Spouse: Anna Schmidt
- Children: Alla (1914); Valeriu (1917)
- Profession: Historian

Ștefan Ciobanu (born 11 November 1883 – 28 February 1950) was a Moldovan historian and academician, author of some important works about ancient Romanian literature, Romanian culture in Basarabia under Russian occupation, Bessarabian demography, fervent advocate of the introduction of the Romanian language in the schools of Bessarabia, vice-president of the Romanian Academy between 1944 and 1948. He served as Minister of Education (1917–1918) of the short-lived Moldavian Democratic Republic.

== Biography ==
Ciobanu was born on 11 November 1883 in Talmaza, at the time in Tighina County, Bessarabia, Russian Empire, now in Moldova. He studied at Kyiv University (1907–1912). Ciobanu served as the Minister of Education in the Pantelimon Erhan Cabinet, the Daniel Ciugureanu Cabinet, and the Petru Cazacu Cabinet. He died on 28 February 1950 in Bucharest, Romania.

== Works ==
- "La continuité roumaine dans la Bessarabie annexée en 1812 par la Russie", Bulletin de la Section historique de l'Académie roumaine, nr. 1/1920
- Cultura românească în Basarabia sub stăpânirea rusă, Chișinău, 1923
- "Biserici vechi din Basarabia din bibliotecile rusești", Anuarul Comisiei Monumentelor istorice. Secția Basarabia, Chișinău, 1924
- Chișinăul (monografie). Chișinău, 1925
- Dimitrie Cantemir in Rusia, Cultura Natională, București,1925.
- Basarabia. Monografie sub îngrijirea lui Ștefan Ciobanu. Chișinău, 1926
- Cetatea Tighina// Anuarul Comisiunii monumentelor istorice. Secția Basarabia. Chișinău, 1928
- Documente din Basarabia (with P. Visarion, Șt. Berechet; C. Tomescu, L.T. Boga), vol.1 -2, Chișinău, 1928 -1938
- Unirea Basarabiei. Studiu și documente cu privire la mișcarea națională din Basarabia la anii 1917–1918. București, 1929
- Mânăstirea Țigănești. Chișinău, 1931
- Din istoria mișcării naționale în Basarabia. Chișinău, 1933
- Din legaturile Culturale Romano-Ucrainiene: Ioannichie Galeatovschi si Literatura Romaneasca Veche, Imprimeria Nationala, Bucuresti,1938.
- Inceputurile Scrisului in Limba Româneasca, Imprimeria Națională, București,1941.
- Introducere în Istoria Literaturii Române, Orientări Metodologice, Ed. Casa Școalelor,1944
- Istoria Literaturii Române Vechi, Imprimeria Națională, București,1947; Ed. Eminescu 1989, ISBN 973-22-0018-9
- La Bessarabie. Sa population, son passé, sa culture. Bucarest, 1941; Ed. rom.: Basarabia. Populația, istoria, cultura. Chișinău, Ed. Știința, 1992
- "Un decument inedit din timurile lui Ștefan cel Mare", Revista istorică Română, vol. XIY, fasc. I, 1944
- "Domnitorul Moldovei Petru Rareș în literatura rusă veche", Revista istorică Română, vol. XIY, fasc. III, 1945

== Bibliography ==
- Rusu, Dorina N., Membrii Academiei Române, 1866–1999, Editura Academiei Române, București, 1999, ISBN 973-27-0696-7
