= Al Nour =

Al Nour may refer to:

- Al-Nour Party, an Egyptian political party created in 2011
- Al-Nour, a pro-Hezbollah radio station
- Alexis Nour (1877–1940), a Bessarabian-born Romanian journalist, activist and essayist
