= Basarabia (newspaper) =

1906–1907 biweekly Romanian-language newspaper in Bessarabia, Russian Empire

- Type: newspaper
- Founded: 1906
- Ceased publication: 1907
- Language: Romanian
- Headquarters: Chişinău
- Sister newspapers: Viaţa Basarabiei

Basarabia was the first Romanian language newspaper to be published in Bessarabian guberniya of the Russian Empire in 1906–1907.

== History ==
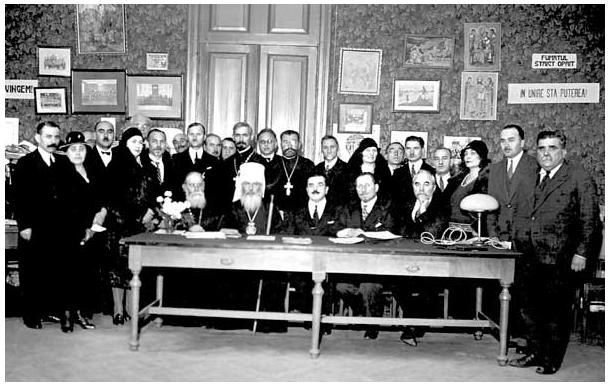
In May 1931 the founders and employees of Basarabia celebrated 25 years since the launch

It was written with the Romanian Cyrillic alphabet and published twice weekly. Labeling itself a "national-democratic gazette", the newspaper asked within its articles for land reform, autonomy and self-government for Bessarabia and the usage of Moldovan in schools and administration. It published articles by Constantin Stere, Ion Inculeţ, Ion Pelivan, Alexei Mateevici, and Pan Halippa.

On March 1, 1907, the newspaper published the Romanian patriotic song "Deşteaptă-te, române!" ("Awaken thee, Romanian!"), which prompted the governor, Alexei Kharuzin, to order its closure. The Russian noble families and the Russian Orthodox Church began a campaign of purging Romanian nationalists from the church and cultural institutions. Many of the supporters of the newspaper were forced to flee to Iaşi, in Romania, where Stere helped them to become students at University of Iaşi.

A more moderate attempt to continue Basarabia's work began in 1907, a publication named Viaţa Basarabiei led by Alexis Nour, written in two versions: with Romanian Latin and Cyrillic alphabets, but after just six issues (April 22 - May 25, 1907), it also ceased its publication.
