= Sighetu Marmației Paupers Cemetery =

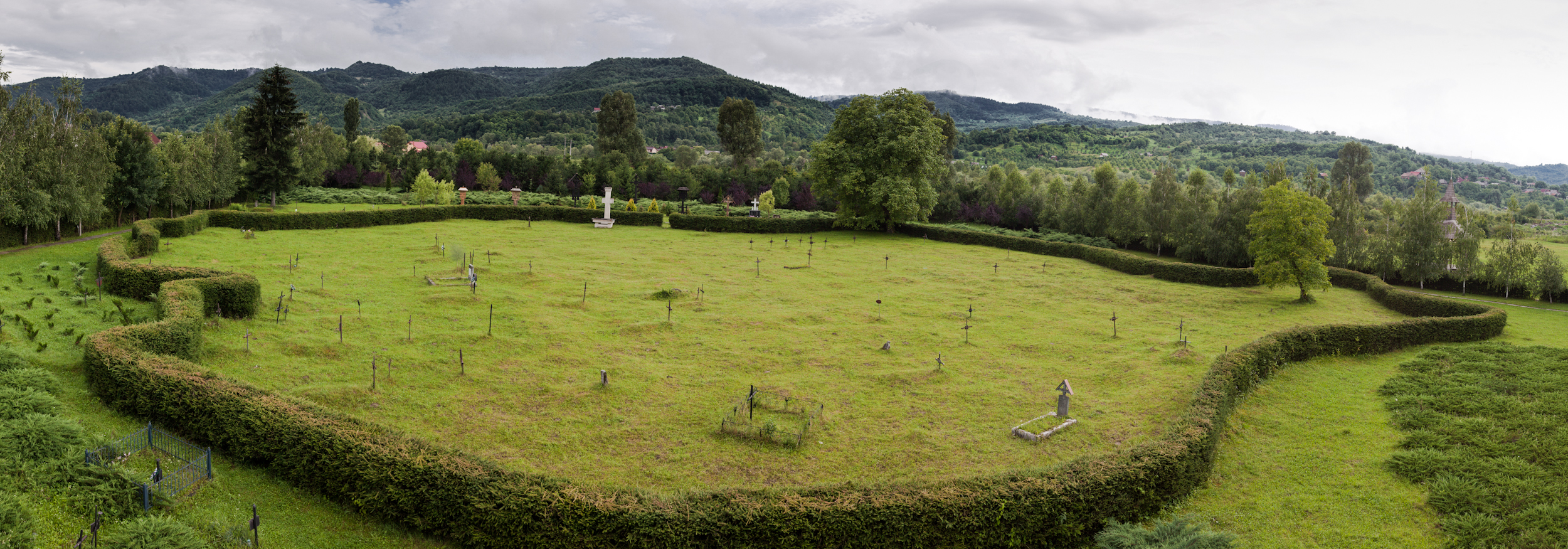
The cemetery.

The Sighetu Marmației Paupers Cemetery (Romanian: Cimitirul Săracilor din Sighetu Marmației) is a Romanian cemetery located in the city of Sighetu Marmației, Maramureș County in northwestern Romania. It served throughout the 20th century as a burial place for the poor and homeless and in the early 1950s political prisoners from Sighet Prison were buried here.

== Notable burials ==
- Iuliu Maniu
- Daniel Ciugureanu
- Constantin IC Brătianu
- Gheorghe Brătianu
