= Viața Basarabiei (1907) =

Viaţa Basarabiei
- Type: Newspaper
- Editor: Alexis Nour
- Founded: 1907
- Ceased publication: 1907
- Language: Romanian
- Headquarters: Chişinău
- Sister newspapers: Basarabia

Viaţa Basarabiei (English: Bessarabia's Life) was a Romanian language periodical from Chişinău, Moldova.

== History ==
Viaţa Basarabiei was published between April 22 and May 25, 1907. It was a more moderate attempt to continue Basarabia's work. Viaţa Basarabiei was led by Alexis Nour and written in two versions: with Romanian Latin alphabet and Cyrillic alphabets, but after just six issues it also ceased its publication.
