= Talmaza =

- Village
- Location in Moldova
- Coordinates: 46°38′N 29°40′E
- Country: Moldova
- District: Ștefan Vodă District

Population (2014 census)
  - Total: 6,341
- Time zone: UTC+2 (EET)
  - Summer (DST): UTC+3 (EEST)
- Website: www.talmaza.info

Talmaza is a village in Ștefan Vodă District, Moldova.

== Demographics ==
The village has a population of 8069 residents; 4907 males and 3162 females. There are 937 residents aged 60 and older. There are 44 first grade and 206 second grade students. There were 80 children born and 109 deaths in 2010.

== Economy ==
Agricultural lands of the community cover 6,068.3 hectares (14,995 acres), 5184.9 of which are arable. Pastures equal 793.1 hectares, forests - 2263.7 and water basin 329.4 hectares. The animal population is approximately 4660 goats and sheep, 420 bovines (including 264 cows), and 64 horses.

Over 100 companies and entrepreneurs are there; 24 in commerce, 16 in agriculture (including 2 cattle farms), 12 in public services, 6 in transportation, 4 in medicine/pharmaceuticals, 1 in construction and 1 in telecommunications.

== Services ==
Public institutions include two primary schools (grades 1-9), one high school (grades 10-12), three kindergartens and one hospital.

== Notable people ==
- Ștefan Ciobanu
