= Șirăuți =

- Village
- Location in Moldova
- Coordinates: 48°14′N 26°51′E
- Country: Moldova
- District: Briceni District
- Elevation: 505 ft (154 m)

Population (2014 census)
  - Total: 2,211
- Time zone: UTC+2 (EET)
  - Summer (DST): UTC+3 (EEST)
- Postal code: MD-4736
- Area code: +373 247

Șirăuți is a village in Briceni District, Moldova.

== Notable people ==
- Daniel Ciugureanu
