= Petru Cazacu =

Moldovan politician (1873–1956)

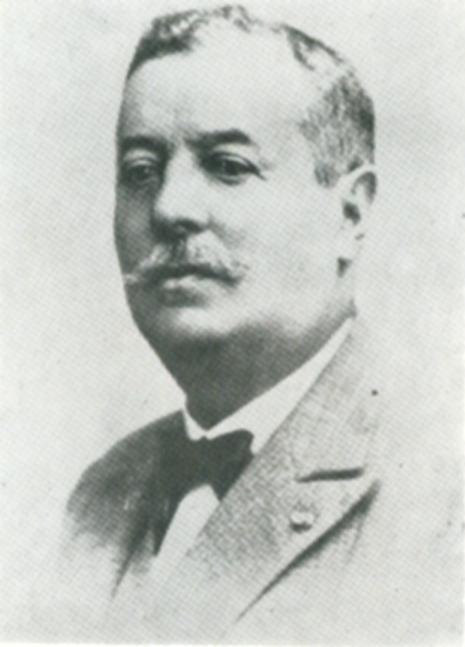
- Cazacu in 1930

Prime Minister of the Moldavian Democratic Republic
- In office 9 April 1918 – 29 November 1918
- President: Ion Inculeț
- Preceded by: Daniel Ciugureanu
- Succeeded by: Union with Romania

Personal details
- Born: 6 October 1873 Chișinău
- Died: August 1956 Bucharest
- Profession: Physician

Petru Cazacu (Romanian: [kaˈzaku]; 6 October 1873 – August 1956) was a politician from Bessarabia (Moldova).

== Biography ==
He served as the prime minister of the Moldavian Democratic Republic in 1918.

== Works ==
- P. Cazacu, Moldova dintre Prut și Nistru. 1812–1918, Chișinău, 1992.
- P. Cazacu, Zece ani de la Unire: Moldova dintre Prut și Nistru 1918-1928. București, Tipografia ziarului Universul,1928

Political offices
| Preceded by Daniel Ciugureanu | Prime Minister of Moldova; 22 April [O.S. 9 April] 1918 - 12 December [O.S. 29 November] 1918 | Succeeded by Union with Romania |
