= Daniel Ciugureanu =

Moldovan-Romanian politician (1885–1950)

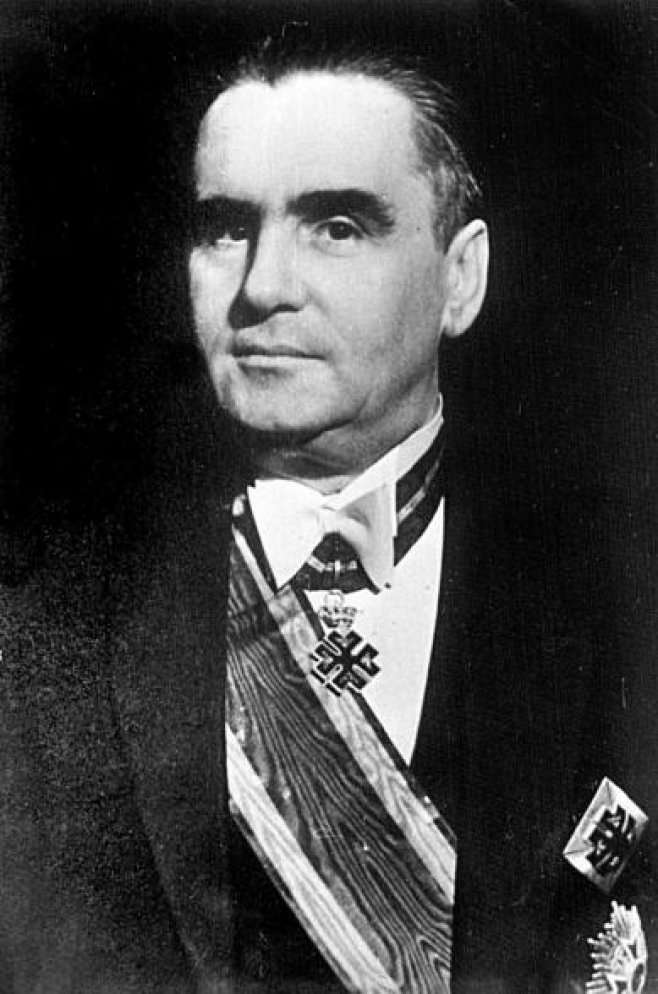

Prime Minister of the Moldavian Democratic Republic
- In office 16 January 1918 – 8 April 1918
- President: Ion Inculeț
- Preceded by: Pantelimon Erhan
- Succeeded by: Petru Cazacu

Minister of State for Bessarabia
- In office 9 April 1918 – 23 October 1918
- Prime Minister: Alexandru Marghiloman
- In office 24 October 1918 – 28 November 1918
- Prime Minister: Constantin Coandă
- In office 29 November 1918 – 26 September 1919
- Prime Minister: Ion I. C. Brătianu
- In office 27 September 1919 – 30 November 1919
- Prime Minister: Artur Văitoianu

Personal details
- Born: 9 December 1885 Șirăuți, Bessarabia Governorate
- Died: 19 May 1950 (aged 64) Sighet Prison, Romanian People's Republic
- Resting place: Cernica Monastery
- Education: Kyiv Imperial University of Saint Vladimir
- Profession: Surgeon
- Awards: Order of the Crown (Romania), Grand Cross; Order of the Star of Romania, Grand Officer; National Order of Faithful Service, Grand Officer

Daniel Ciugureanu (Romanian: [daniˈel tʃjuɡuˈre̯anu]; 9 December 1885 – 19 May 1950) was a Romanian politician from Bessarabia, deputy in Sfatul Țării from Chișinău, Prime Minister of the Moldavian Democratic Republic from 29 January [O.S. 16 January] 1918–21 April [O.S. 8 April] 1918, Minister for Bessarabia in four Romanian Governments, Deputy and Senator, vice-president of the Chamber of Deputies, vice-president and President of the Senate of Kingdom of Romania.

He was born in 1885 in Șirăuți, Khotinsky Uyezd, in the Bessarabia Governorate of the Russian Empire, the son of Alexandru Ciugureanu, a priest, and his wife, Ecaterina, a teacher. After attending secondary school in Bălți and the theological seminary in Chișinău, he enrolled in 1905 at the Kyiv Imperial University of Saint Vladimir, graduating from medical school in 1912.

Ciugureanu was one of the founders and leaders of the National Moldavian Party and one of the promoters of the Union of Bessarabia with Romania. On 6 February [O.S. 24 January] 1918, the Sfatul Țării voted unanimously to proclaim the independence of the Moldavian Democratic Republic. The Board of Directors became the Council of Ministers, and Ciugureanu was elected Prime Minister of the new republic. In fact, it was a reconfirmation of the function in the light of the fact that he was elected First Director on 29 January [O.S. 16 January] 1918.

After the Union of Bessarabia with Romania he served as minister for Bessarabia in four Romanian governments from 9 April 1918 to 30 November 1919.

Ciugureanu was arrested on 5 May 1950 by the communist authorities of Romania. While being transported in a van, he had a stroke at Turda. According to some sources, he died at a nearby hospital the next day; according to official records of the Securitate, he died several days later at Sighet Prison. He was buried at the Sighetu Marmației Paupers Cemetery, in a common grave.

As his grave is not known, in 1993 a cross was installed at the Sighet Cemetery, while his son, Gheorghe Ciugureanu, had a cenotaph erected at the cemetery next to Cernica Monastery, near Bucharest.

== See also ==
- Daniel Ciugureanu Cabinet

Political offices
Preceded by Pantelimon Erhan	Prime Minister of Moldova; 30 January [O.S. 17 January] 1918 - 21 April [O.S. 8 April] 1918	Succeeded by Petru Cazacu
