= Moldavian Democratic Republic =

Former country

Moldavian Democratic Republic Republica Democratică Moldovenească (Romanian)
- 1917–1918
- Flag Coat of arms
- Anthem: "Deșteaptă-te, române!" ("Awaken thee, Romanian!")
- Territory claimed by the Moldavian Democratic Republic
- Capital: Chișinău
- Common languages: Romanian, Russian
- Government: Republic
- President
  - 1917–1918: Ion Inculeț
- Legislature: Sfatul Țării
- Historical era: World War I
  - Established: 15 December [O.S. 2 December] 1917^{a}
  - Independence: 6 February [O.S. 24 January] 1918
  - Union with Romania: 9 April [O.S. 27 March] 1918
Preceded by	Succeeded by
Bessarabia Governorate	Kingdom of Romania
- Today part of: Moldova; Ukraine
- 1. See Adoption of the Gregorian calendar.

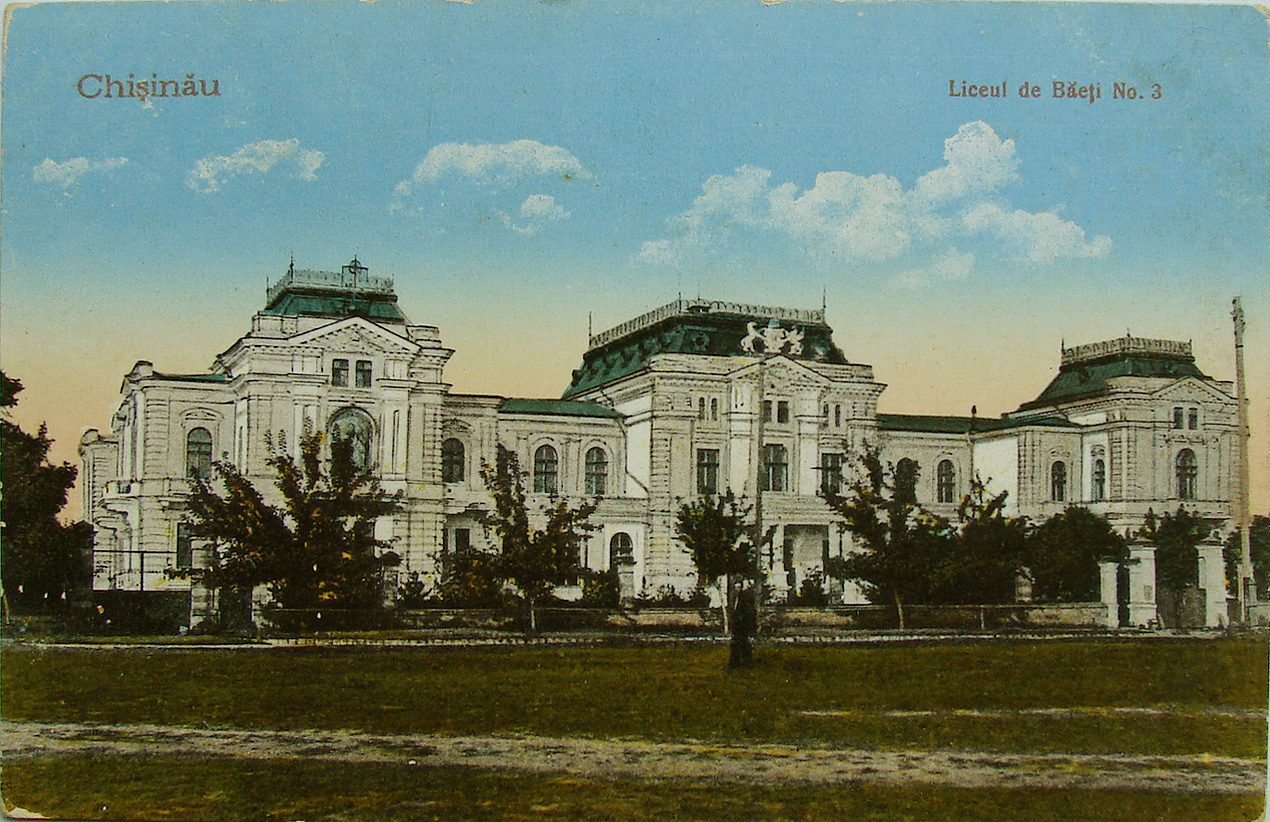
Sfatul Țării Palace.

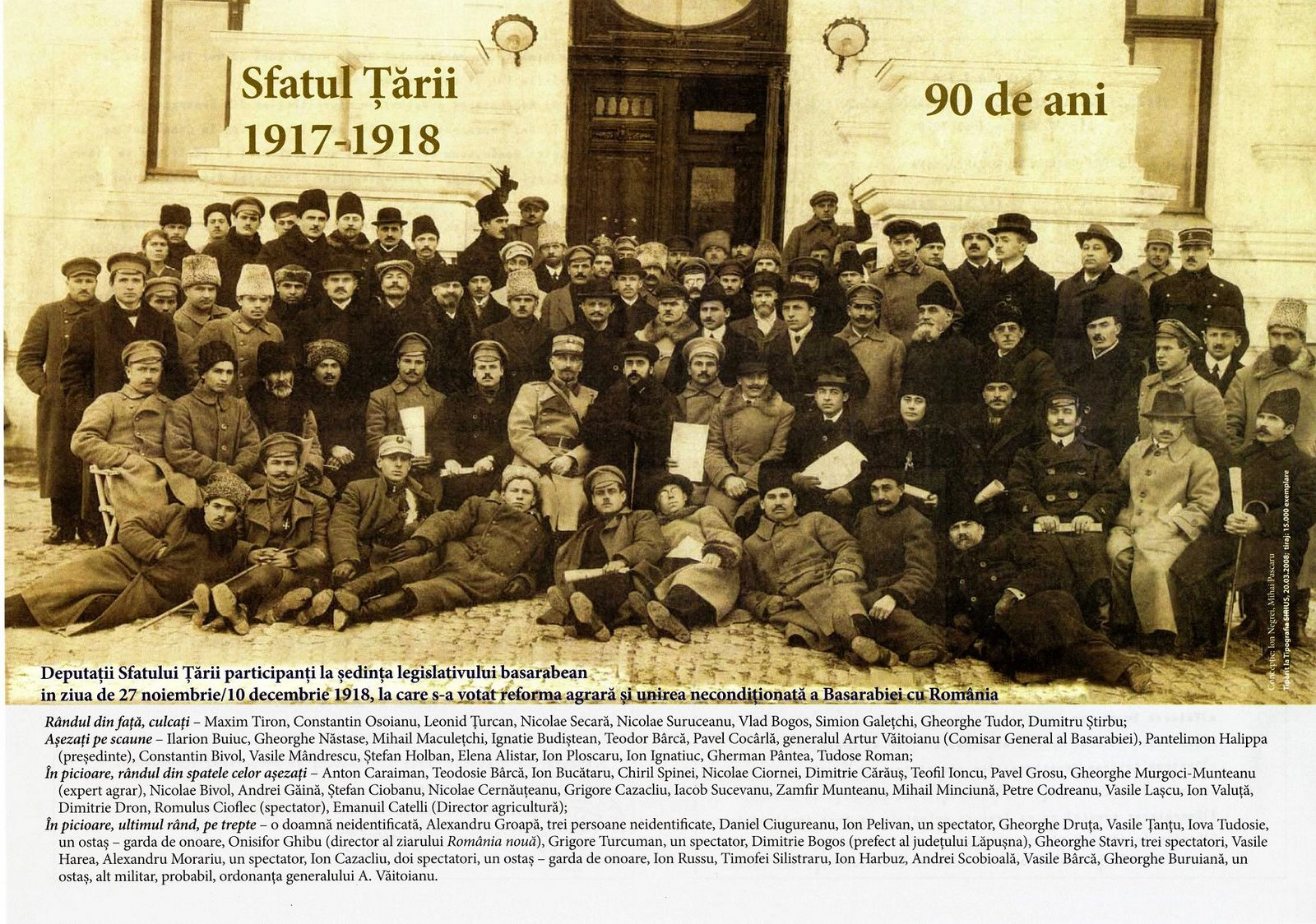
Sfatul Țării members in front of the parliament building.

The Moldavian Democratic Republic (MDR; Romanian: Republica Democratică Moldovenească, RDM), also known as the Moldavian Republic or Moldavian People's Republic, was a state proclaimed on 15 December [O.S. 2 December] 1917 by the Sfatul Țării (National Council) of Bessarabia, elected in October–November 1917 following the February Revolution and the start of the disintegration of the Russian Empire.

The Sfatul Țării was its legislative body, while the "Council of Directors General", renamed the "Council of Ministers" after the Declaration of Independence, was its government. The Republic was proclaimed on 2/15 December 1917, as a result of the Declaration of the Rights of the Peoples of Russia.

The anthem of the country was Deșteaptă-te, române!.

== History ==
=== Summarized ===
The brief history of the 1917–1918 Moldavian Democratic Republic can be divided into three periods: the period of autonomy within Russia, the period of independence, and the period of federation with Romania. On 2/15 December, Moldavia proclaimed itself a constituent republic of the Russian Federative Democratic Republic. On 1/14 January 1918, the Front Section of the Rumcherod Bolsheviks entered Chișinău, the capital of the nascent republic. After the nationalist faction of the Sfatul Țării requested military assistance from Romania, the Romanian Army crossed the republic's border on 10/23 January, taking the capital within days. With the Romanian Army in full control, on 24 January/6 February, the Moldavian Democratic Republic proclaimed its independence. On 27 March/9 April, Moldavia entered a conditioned union (essentially a federation) with the Kingdom of Romania, retaining its provincial autonomy as well as its legislative body (the Sfatul Țării). On 27 November/10 December, after the end of World War I, a secret meeting of Sfatul Țării members renounced all conditions and proclaimed the unconditional union of Bessarabia with Romania, effectively amounting to an annexation by the latter. This was its last act, as it was subsequently dissolved and prominent unionists were invited to Bucharest. During its 1-year existence, the Moldavian Democratic Republic had three Prime Ministers: Pantelimon Erhan, Daniel Ciugureanu and Petru Cazacu.

=== Detailed ===
When the February Revolution occurred in Petrograd in 1917, the governor of the Bessarabia Governorate stepped down and passed his legal powers to Constantin Mimi, the President of the Gubernial Zemstvo, which was named the Commissar of the Provisional Government in Bessarabia, with Vladimir Cristi his deputy. Similar procedures took place in all regions of the Russian Empire: the chiefs of the Tsarist administrations passed their legal powers to the chiefs of the County and Governorate Zemstvos, which were then called County/Governorate Commissars.

The Peasants' Congress, which took place in October 1917, voted Mimi out and Ion Inculeț in as the new Commissar. This move was planned by Alexander Kerensky, who sent Inculeț, an associate professor at the University of Petrograd, to Bessarabia to take hold of the situation. As soon as the Peasants' Congress, which had no legal power, voted, Kerenski formally replaced Mimi with Inculeț. When Inculeț arrived in Chișinău to take power, he faced the quiet opposition of the nobility, so he agreed to take the position of deputy commissar to Vladimir Cristi. When the republic was proclaimed, Cristi stepped down and passed his legal powers to Inculeț.

The Sfatul Țării (National Council) of Bessarabia was elected in October–November 1917, and started to work in December 1917. It proclaimed the Moldavian Democratic Republic as a federal subject (autonomous republic) of the Russian Democratic Federative Republic. The Sfatul Țării voted 86 in favour of proclamation, 6 against, and 36 abstentions. However only within three days, the Bolsheviks seized power in Chișinău.

In the context of the October Revolution, the Russian Army on the Romanian Front disintegrated. The large number of retreating soldiers increased the level of anarchy in Bessarabia, leaving the National Council with only minimal authority over the territory. To further complicate matters, as the council was delaying a decision on the agrarian question, peasants across the region started to break up the estates of the large landowners and divide them among themselves. As the General Staff of the Romanian Front was unable to send any troops, attempts were made to organize a Moldavian National Guard, but the results were far from expectations. Furthermore, most of the army corps nominally subjected to the National Council came under Bolshevik influence. However, in mid-January Romanians entered the country, engaged in battles with the Moldavian and Bolshevik troops and within a couple of weeks controlled much of the country. Among the leaders of Moldavian troops that offered resistance were also figures formerly loyal to the National Council, such as captain Anatolie Popa.

Following the signing of separate peace armistices by Imperial Germany with Romania, Ukraine and Bolshevik Russia the Sfatul Țării, with 86 votes in favour, 3 against and 36 abstentions, proclaimed the Union of Bessarabia with the Kingdom of Romania on 9 April [O.S. 27 March] 1918, with the condition of local autonomy and the continuation of Bessarabian legislative and executive bodies, legally ending the Moldavian Democratic Republic. Discouraged by the fact that the Romanian troops were already present in Chișinău, many minority deputies abstained from voting. The union was confirmed in the Treaty of Paris (1920).

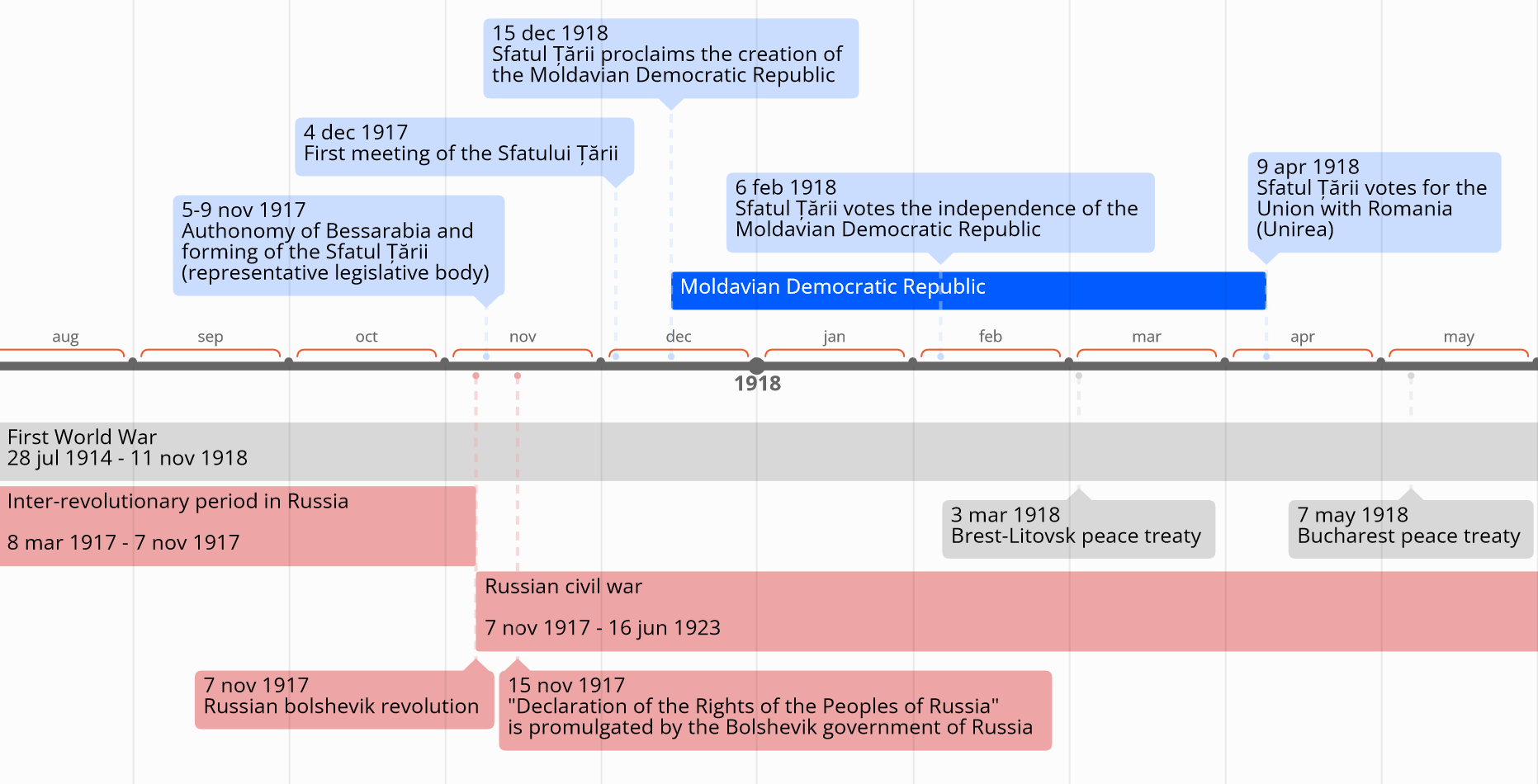
Some key events and historical context. All dates follow the gregorian calendar

== Leadership ==
The leadership of the Moldavian Republic was composed of Ion Inculeț, the president of the Sfatul Țării and President of the Republic; and Pantelimon Erhan, the President of the Council of Directors General. The new leadership and Council was put in place after the country was declared independence by Daniel Ciugureanu, as President of the Council of Ministers. The Sfatul Țării was initially composed of 120 elected members, although member numbers were later increased to 135 and then 150. For example, on 9 April, there were 138 legislators, of which 125 took part in the vote, and 13 were absent.

On 21 December [O.S. 8 December] 1917, the Sfatul Țării elected the government of the Moldavian Democratic Republic - the Council of Directors General, with nine members, seven Moldavians, one Ukrainian, and one Jew:

- Pantelimon Erhan, President of the council, and Director General for Agriculture.
- Vladimir Cristi, Director General for Internal Affairs.
- Ștefan Ciobanu, Director General for Education.
- Teofil Ioncu, Director General for Finance.
- Nicolae Bosie-Codreanu, Director General for Railways.
- Major Teodor Cojocaru, Director General for Armed Forces.
- Mihail Savenco, Director General for Justice.
- E. Grinfeld, Director General for Industry and Trade.
- Ion Pelivan, Director General for Foreign Affairs.

In its first decree, the Council set forward the aim to "introduce order in all the aspects of life of the country, to eliminate anarchy and disaster, to organize all the aspects of state administration". An Executive Clerk Office (Cancelarie) of the Council of Directors General was set up, and all state, public and private institutions were required to communicate through the Executive Clerk Office to the corresponding Director General for all questions regarding the government of the country. All acts in the domain of public administration made without the previous consent of the respective Directors-General were declared legally void, while the director freed from responsibility for such acts.

== See also ==
- Union of Bessarabia with Romania
- Soviet occupation of Bessarabia and Northern Bukovina
- Russian Revolution of 1917
- Odessa Soviet Republic
- Iona Yakir
- Former countries in Europe after 1815
