= Union of Bessarabia with Romania =

Regional unification in Eastern Europe, 1918–40 and 1941–44

The union of Bessarabia with Romania was proclaimed on 9 April [O.S. 27 March] 1918 by Sfatul Țării, the legislative body of the Moldavian Democratic Republic. This state had the same borders of the region of Bessarabia, which was annexed by the Russian Empire following the Treaty of Bucharest of 1812 and organized first as an Oblast (autonomous until 1828) and later as a Governorate. Under Russian rule, many of the native Tatars were expelled from parts of Bessarabia and replaced with Moldavians, Wallachians, Bulgarians, Ukrainians, Greeks, Russians, Lipovans, Cossacks, Gagauzes and other peoples, although colonization was not limited to formerly Tatar-inhabited lands. Russia also tried to integrate the region by imposing the Russian language in administration and restricting education in other languages, notably by later banning the use of Romanian in schools and print.

The beginning of World War I saw an increase in national awareness among the Bessarabians, and, following the beginning of the Russian Revolution in 1917, Bessarabia proclaimed its own parliament, the Sfatul Țării, which declared the Moldavian Democratic Republic. Following a Romanian military intervention, with the Romanian Army firmly in control of the region, the Sfatul Țării voted for independence and later proclaimed, on 9 April [O.S. 27 March] 1918, its union with the Kingdom of Romania. Although the unification was made under various conditions, all of these except the promise of an agrarian reform, which was carried out, were later abandoned by a minority of the Sfatul. Later, the Romanian administration swiftly dissolved the assembly and rejected the protests of the former deputies. In the peace talks after World War I, the European powers awarded Bessarabia to Romania, although the newly formed Russian SSR, and the United States never recognized this.

However, the situation in Bessarabia would change after the signing of the Molotov–Ribbentrop Pact between the Soviet Union (USSR) and Nazi Germany, in which the latter expressed its disinterest in the region. This allowed the USSR to send an ultimatum to Romania, which was now diplomatically isolated following the capitulation of France, the guarantor of its borders, on 26 June 1940 in which it demanded Bessarabia and also Northern Bukovina (which had not been agreed upon with Germany). After Romania accepted it, the USSR invaded these territories, ending Romanian administration of the zone (excepting a brief interruption from 1941 to 1944, when Romania reacquired these territories). Bessarabia was organized and split between the Ukrainian SSR and the new Moldavian SSR, which gained independence in 1991 as Moldova. Ever since, there has been a growing movement to reunite the region with Romania, with supporters in Romania and Moldova commemorating the day of the union, 27 March, on the Day of the Union of Bessarabia with Romania.

== Governorate of Bessarabia ==
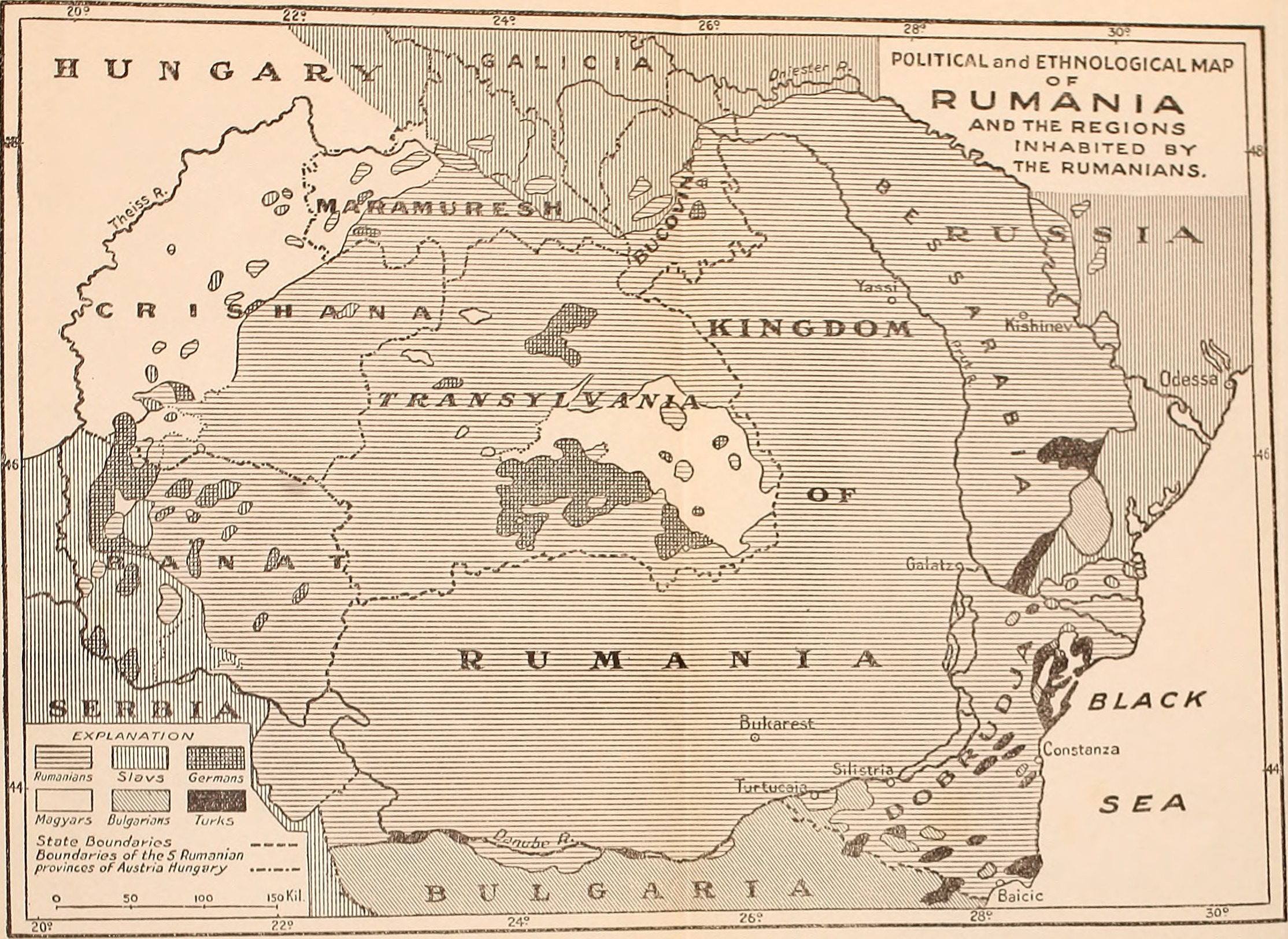
1918 map of the region

The 1812 Treaty of Bucharest between the Ottoman Empire and the Russian Empire provided for Russian annexation of the eastern part of the territory of the Principality of Moldavia, as well as the Turkish-ruled regions of Khotyn and Budjak (Southern Bessarabia). At first, the Russians used the name "Oblast of Moldova and Bessarabia", allowing a large degree of autonomy, but in 1828 Russia suspended the self-administration and called it the Governorate of Bessarabia, or simply Bessarabia. While the northeastern part of Moldavia, called Bukovina, was similarly annexed by the Austrian Empire, the western part of Moldavia remained an autonomous principality, and in 1859, united with Wallachia to form the Kingdom of Romania. In 1856, the Treaty of Paris returned the south of Bessarabia to Moldavia, but in 1878, the Kingdom of Romania returned them to the Russian Empire as a result of the Treaty of Berlin.

At the time of annexation, Moldavian population predominated in Bessarabia. The colonization of the region in the 19th century led to a large increase in the Russian, Ukrainian, Lipovan, and Cossack population in the region; this together with a large influx of Bulgarian immigrants increased the Slavic population to more than a fifth of the total population by 1920. Other groups, such as Gagauz, Jews, and Germans also settled in the region during the Russian rule.

The Tsarist policy in Bessarabia was in part aimed at denationalization of the Moldavian element by forbidding after the 1860s education and Liturgy in Romanian. However, the effect was an extremely low literacy rate (in 1897, 18% for males and 4% for females) rather than denationalization. Some Romanian historians claimed that a strong sentiment of frustration and resentment to the Russian control had started to appear before the beginning of World War I.

== Moldavian Democratic Republic ==
World War I brought a rise in political, cultural and national awareness in the population, as 300,000 Bessarabians enrolled in the Russian Army formed in 1917, within bigger units several "Moldavian Soldiers' Committees". Following the Russian Revolution of 1917, Bessarabia elected its own parliament, Sfatul Țării (October–November 1917), which opened on 3 December [O.S. 20 November] 1917, proclaimed the Moldavian Democratic Republic (15 December [O.S. 2 December] 1917), formed its government (21 December [O.S. 8 December] 1917), proclaimed independence from Russia (6 February [O.S. 24 January] 1918).

== The Union Act ==
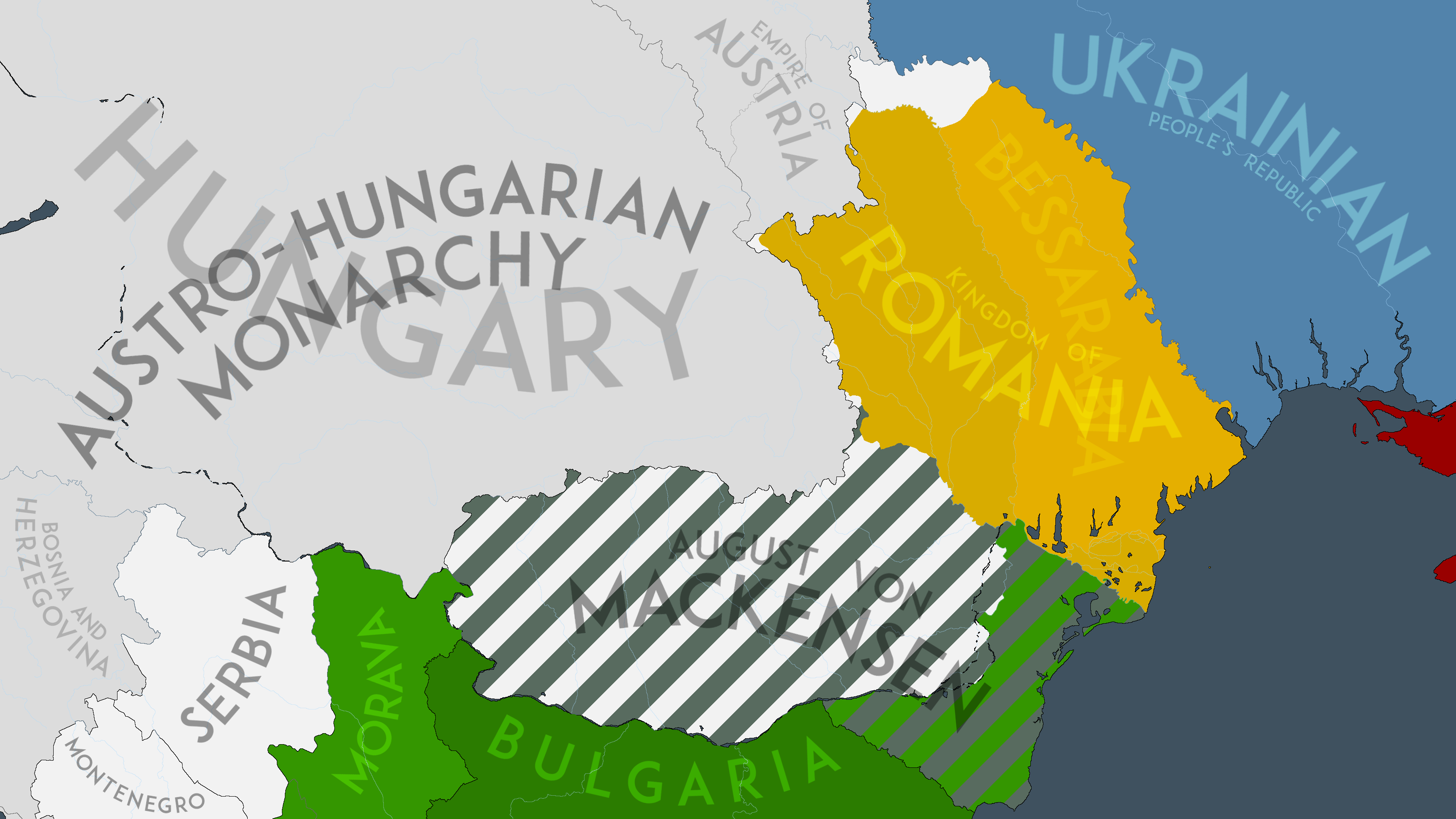
Romania on 9 April 1918, after the Sfatul Tarii of the Moldovan Democratic Republic voted to unite with Romania.

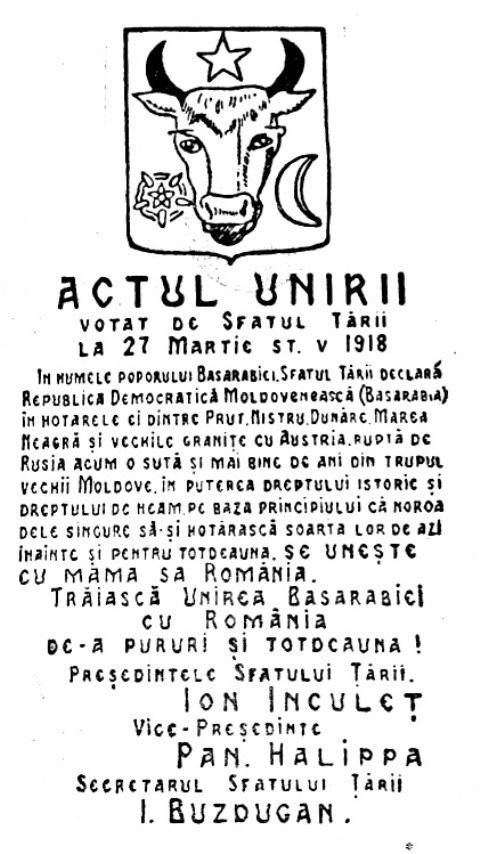
The Union Act of 1918.

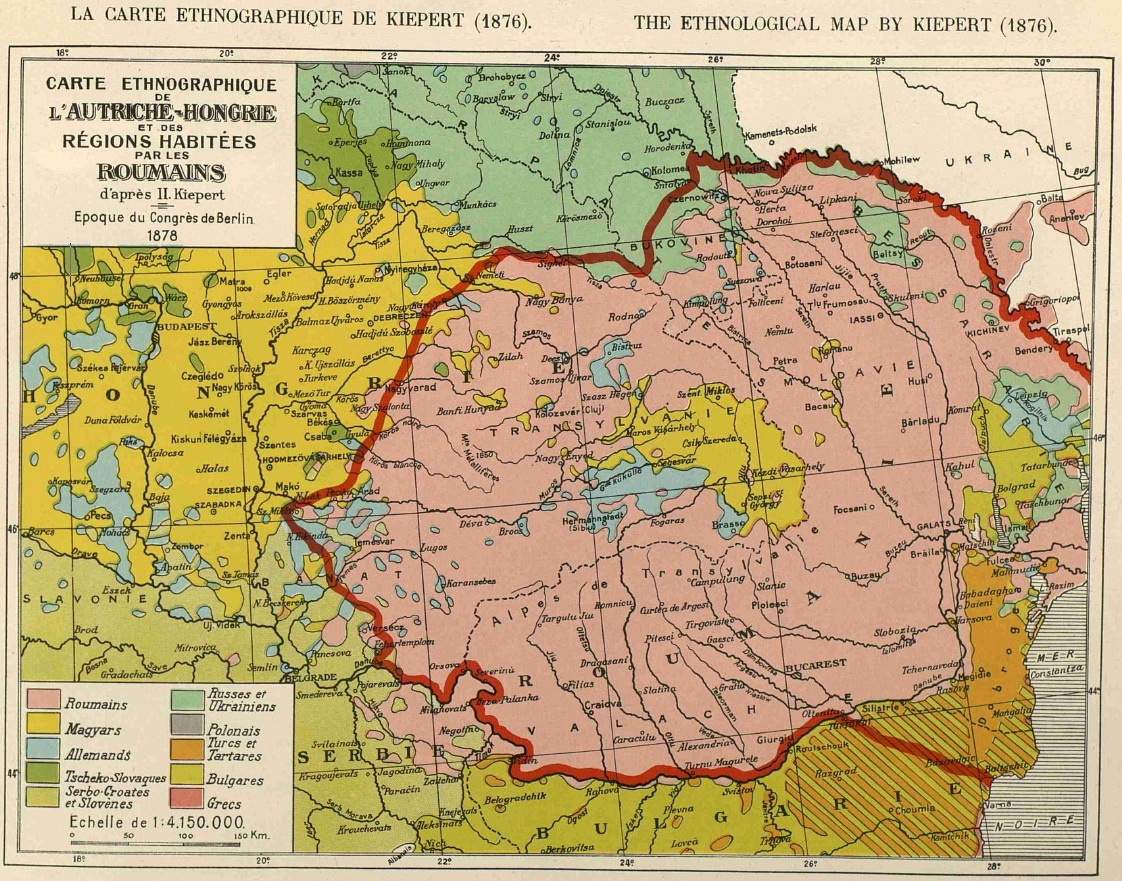
The ethnological map of the Romanian population by Heinrich Kiepert, 1876.

On 9 April [O.S. 27 March] 1918, Sfatul Țării decided with 86 votes for, 3 against and 36 abstaining (mostly non-Romanians), for union with the Kingdom of Romania, conditional upon the fulfillment of agrarian reform, local autonomy, and respect for universal human rights. This was in spite of the fact that the national referendum necessary under the law had not taken place.

Fearing a radical land reform, the county councils of Bălți, Soroca and Orhei, dominated by large landowners, were the earliest to ask for unification with the Kingdom of Romania, deeming the royal government preferable to the Sfatul Țării, dominated by left-wing populists. On April 9 [O.S. March 27] 1918, Sfatul Țării voted in favour of the union, with the following conditions:

1. Sfatul Țării would undertake an agrarian reform, which would be accepted by the Romanian Government.
2. Bessarabia would remain autonomous, with its own diet, Sfatul Țării, elected democratically
3. Sfatul Țării would vote for local budgets, control the councils of zemstvos and cities, and name the local administration
4. Conscription would be done on a territorial basis
5. Local laws and the form of administration could be changed only with the approval of local representatives
6. The rights of minorities had to be respected
7. Two Bessarabian representatives would be part of the Romanian government
8. Bessarabia would send to the Romanian Parliament a number of representatives equal to the proportion of its population
9. All elections must involve a direct, equal, secret, and universal vote
10. Freedom of speech and of belief must be guaranteed in the constitution
11. All individuals who had committed felonies for political reasons during the revolution would be amnestied.

== Greater Romania ==
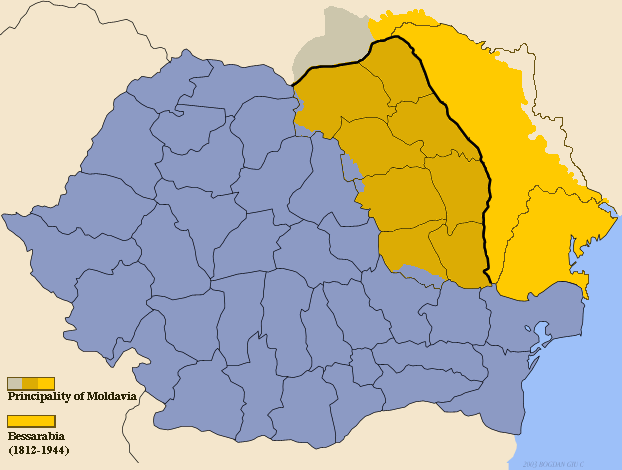
Bessarabia in yellow and Northern Bukovina in grey, as a parts of Kingdom of Romania. Note: the region past the Dniester river was a part of Romania only briefly, during World War II

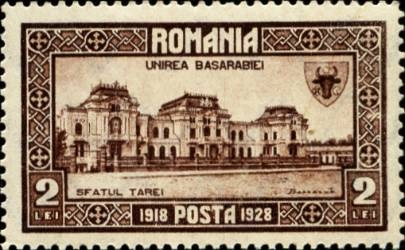
Romanian stamp commemorating 10 years of the Union

There were 86 votes for, 3 votes against and 36 deputies abstained. The first condition for agrarian reform was debated and approved in November 1918, and following this, Sfatul Țării voted a motion which removed all the other conditions, trusting that Romania would be a democratic country. The vote, which renounced Bessarabia's autonomy, has been judged illegitimate, since there was no quorum: only 44 of the 125 members took part in it (all voted "for").

The historian Bernard Newman, who traveled by bicycle through the whole of Greater Romania, claimed there is little doubt that the vote represented the prevailing wish in Bessarabia and that the events leading to the unification indicate there was no question of a "seizure", but a voluntary act on the part of its people.

The Romanian prime-minister at the time, Alexandru Marghiloman, was to admit however that the unification was decided in Romania, as the Moldavian leaders Daniel Ciugureanu and Ion Inculeț, aware of the widespread distrust of Romanian rule, feared an overt annexation would lead to a revolutionary situation.

In the autumn of 1919, general elections were held in Bessarabia to elect 90 deputies and 35 senators to the Romanian parliament – the Constituent Assembly. On 20 December 1919, the elected representatives ratified, along with their colleagues from the other historic provinces, the unification acts that had been approved by Sfatul Țării and the National Congresses in Transylvania and Bukovina.

During the peace talks between the Great Powers and Romania, on 1 February 1919, British Prime Minister David Lloyd George talked with Ion I. C. Brătianu and, after the withdrawal of the Romanian government's delegation, Lloyd George proposed that Romania's claims be analyzed by a territorial commission that would examine historical, ethnographic, geographic, strategic, but not political facts. The Territorial Commission on Romanian Affairs was formed, by which the representatives of the Big Four Powers presented their proposals and decided Romanian's territorial future. The commission was formed by Clive Day and Charles Seymour (USA), Sir Eyre Crowe and Alan Leeper (United Kingdom), André Tardieu and Guy Laroche (France), and Giacomo De Martino and Count Luigi Vannutelli-Rey (Italy). During the debates the only issue related to Romania on which the representatives agreed was that Bessarabia should belong to Romania. However, the United States refused to sign the Treaty on the grounds that Russia was not represented at the conference. The newly communist Russia did not recognize Romanian rule over Bessarabia, a stand that was tacitly accepted by many other countries such as the United States.

The union was recognized by the United Kingdom, France and Italy in the Treaty of Paris (1920). The treaty did not, however, come into force as Japan, one of the signatories, failed to ratify it. Soviet Russia was not represented as a party at the treaty conference. A mutual treaty between the Soviets and Romania was not signed due to the former's claims over Bessarabia. In the Kellogg-Briand Treaty of 1928 and the Treaty of London of July 1933, the Soviet Union and Romania subscribed to the principle of non-violent resolution of territorial disputes. Transnistria, at the time part of the Ukrainian SSR, itself part of the Soviet Union, was formed into the Moldavian ASSR (1924–1940) after the failure of the Tatarbunar uprising.

The land reform legislated by Sfatul Țării in 1918–1919 resulted in the redistribution of land among the rural population of the region, which constituted 80%. The actual process dragged out until the early 1930s, with the average allotted land falling short of the prescribed 6 hectares per eligible individual. The law was notable among Romanian controlled territories as it expropriated land not only from the large landowners, but also from the peasants who gained land by ad-hoc divisions of the agricultural lands during the Russian Revolution. The reform was further marred by corruption and preferential allotment to Romanian state functionaries and officers, as well as to the deputies who voted for union with Romania in 1918 (the latter were allotted 50 hectares each). Under pressure from the large landowners in the original territories of Romania, the land reform required compensations to the former owners, in contrast with the earlier declarations of the Sfatul Țării which proposed expropriation of property or even socialization. In a bid to gain legal recognition of the union, Romania also concluded inter-governmental accords which offered preferential compensations to deposed owners of British, French and Italian citizenship. In addition, the literacy rate grew to over 40% by 1930; however, the region continued to lag educationally.

In 1924, Pan Halippa, a strong supporter of the Union in 1918, criticized the Romanian government for transforming Bessarabia into an "inferno", where the "Moldavian people suffers and bleeds more than under the Tsarist regime".

== Soviet occupation ==
The status quo was changed 22 years later, when, as a result of the Molotov–Ribbentrop Pact (Article 4 of the Secret Annex to the Treaty), Nazi Germany agreed that it had no interest in Bessarabia, effectively yielding it to the Soviet Union. On June 26, 1940, after the Fall of France, Romania's ally, Romania received an ultimatum from the Soviet Union demanding the evacuation of the Romanian military and administration from Bessarabia and from the northern part of Bukovina, with an implied threat of invasion in the event of noncompliance. Under pressure from Moscow and Berlin, the Romanian administration and the army were forced to retreat from Bessarabia and from Northern Bukovina to avoid war. On June 28, 1940, these territories were occupied by the Soviet Union. During the retreat, the Romanian Army was attacked by the Soviet Army, which entered Bessarabia before the Romanian administration finished retreating. Some 48,888 Romanian soldiers and officers were unaccounted for after the retreat, including 53 casualties. In the case of several army divisions, more than half of the personnel had deserted, choosing to remain in Bessarabia.

The southern and northern parts, whose population was just over half ethnic minorities (Ukrainians, Bessarabian Bulgarians, Bessarabian Germans, and Lipovans), were transferred to the Ukrainian SSR as Izmail Oblast and as part of Chernivtsi Oblast. At the same time, the Moldavian ASSR, where ethnic Romanians were a plurality, was disbanded, and just under half of its territory was joined with the remaining territory of Bessarabia to form the Moldavian Soviet Socialist Republic, coterminous with the present-day Moldova. Although Soviet troops were forced out in 1941 by the invasion of Axis forces, and Romania re-established its administration, the Soviet Union reconquered and reannexed the area in February–August 1944.

The official Soviet policy (1940–1941, 1944–1989) also stated that Romanian and Moldovan were two different languages and, to emphasize the distinction, Moldovan was written using a special Cyrillic alphabet (the Moldovan Cyrillic alphabet) – unlike Romanian, in which Romanian Cyrillic alphabet was replaced by Romanian Latin alphabet in 1860s.

== Legacy ==
1998 Moldovan stamp commemorating 80 years of the Union

Moldova became independent from the Soviet Union in 1991. Since then, there has been a movement to unite again the region with Romania. Furthermore, the union of Bessarabia with Romania is now commemorated on the Day of the Union of Bessarabia with Romania, celebrated every 27 March. In Romania, this holiday is official since 2017. It is not official in Moldova despite attempts at doing so, but some Moldovan unionists celebrate it anyway. The same situation occurs in Transnistria.

== See also ==
- Bessarabian question
- Great Union
- Union of Transylvania with Romania
- Union of Bukovina with Romania
- Greater Romania
- Unification of Moldova and Romania
- Moldova–Romania relations
