= Ion Inculeț =

Bessarabian and Romanian politician (1884–1940)

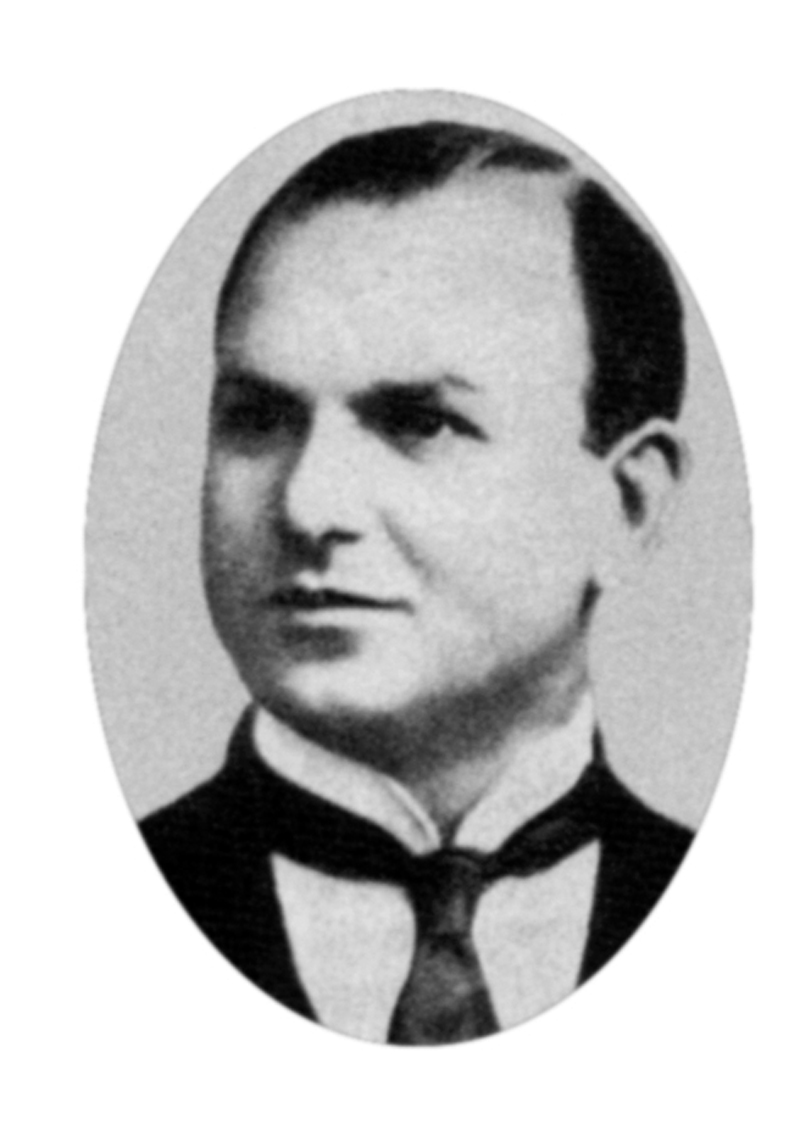
- Inculeț in 1918

1st President of the Moldavian Democratic Republic
- In office 15 December 1917 – 27 March 1918
- Prime Minister: Pantelimon Erhan; Daniil Ciugureanu; Petru Cazacu
- Succeeded by: Union with Romania

President of Sfatul Țării
- In office 4 December 1917 – 27 March 1918
- Succeeded by: Constantin Stere

Member of the Moldovan Parliament
- In office 1917–1918

Minister of the Interior of Romania
- In office 14 November 1933 – 29 August 1936
- Prime Minister: Ion G. Duca; Constantin Angelescu; Gheorghe Tătărăscu
- Preceded by: George Mironescu
- Succeeded by: Dumitru Iuca

Vice President of the Council of Ministers of Romania
- In office 29 August 1936 – 14 November 1937
- Prime Minister: Gheorghe Tătărăscu

Member of the Russian Constituent Assembly
- In office 1917–1918

Personal details
- Born: 5 April [O.S. 24 March] 1884 Răzeni, Russian Empire
- Died: 18 November 1940 (aged 56) Bucharest, Kingdom of Romania
- Party: Socialist Revolutionary Party; Bessarabian Peasants' Party; National Liberal Party; National Renaissance Front
- Spouse: Ruxandra Bașotă-Cantacuzino
- Children: Ion I. Inculeț; Georgel I. Inculeț
- Profession: Lecturer

Ion Inculeț (Romanian: [inkuˈlets]; 5 April [O.S. 24 March] 1884 – 18 November 1940) was a Bessarabian and Romanian politician. He served as President of the Country Council of the Moldavian Democratic Republic, Minister of the Interior of Romania, and, from 1918, a full member of the Romanian Academy.

== Biography ==
Ion Inculeț was born on 5 April 1884 in Răzeni village, which was part of the inter-war (between World War I and World War II) Lăpușna County, in the family of Constantin and Maria Inculeț (née Ionaș), who were peasants. The surname, Inculeț, indicates that Ion might have descended from the Ukrainians and Russians who had settled in Bessarabia. This is because his surname likely comes from the rivers Ingul and Inguleț, which are tributaries of the Bug River, which originates in Ukraine. Indeed, Ion's grandfather was described as either a Great Russian or Ukrainian (he was probably from the areas around the Inculeț rivers) to work as a cellar master for a landowner. However, Ion himself did not always go by the surname "Inguleț", as he also wrote it as Inculetz or Ingulet occasionally when signing himself off.

After his birth, Ion was baptized soon after by a certain Ecaterina Grigore (Grigorievna) Ionaș, the widow of a man named Nicolae Ionaș. Soon after, the family moved to the village of Căinări in Tighina County and then to Chișinău. In 1888, Ion's brother Teodor was born in Căinăria, indicating the family stayed there for some time before moving over to Chișinău.

=== Education ===
For his primary years, he initially attended the Spiritual School for Boys in Chișinău. After graduating from his primary school, in 1894, he was admitted to the Theological School in Chișinău. The school was subordinate to the Theological Seminary. He attended the school for five years, achieving the highest mark of five in a number of subjects, including arithmetic, Russian language and Church Slavonic, church singing, and sacred history, among others. In 1899, he earned the right to enroll in the first class of the Theological Seminary due to his performance at the Theological School. Among his classmates of the first graduating class were Pantelimon Erhan, the future Prime Minister of the Moldavian Democratic Republic, and Vasile Bârcă, who served as Mayor of Chişinău. He graduated from the seminary in June 1905 with the highest mark in the interpretation of the Holy Scriptures and in religious literature, among other things. Interested in studying natural science (then known as exact science), he afterwards enrolled in Dorpat University, which was then part of Iuriev (now Tartu, Estonia).

At Dorpat, he quickly became involved in Basarabia, the first Romanian-language newspaper in Bessarabia, which was then a province of the Russian Empire. In the newspaper, he published articles on civil rights, personal inviolability, local administration, land reform, and relations between nobility and peasants. He wrote under the pseudonym Ion Gându. As he writes later in his memoir, in February 1907, the Tsarist police (the Okhrana), showed up at the editorial offices of the newspapers, confiscated what they could, and forced the people involved in it to leave Bessarabia or remain under police supervision. Thus, he decided to leave Bessarabia for Saint Petersburg. He quickly became involved in politics, joining the city council called the Saint Petersburg Soviet as a delegate of the Teachers' Union. He met influential figures in revolutionary politics there, including Leon Trotsky, and supported the Russian Revolution of 1905, a challenge against the Tsar's absolute power and the monarchy of Russia.

While becoming active in politics, he also started attending the Saint Petersburg Imperial University in 1906 in the Faculty of Physical and Mathematical Sciences. He, however, did not want to study sciences anymore: on 17 September 1907 (and later again on 4 August 1910), he made requests to the rector of the university asking to be admitted to attend courses in the Faculty of Law, but his requests were refused. Interestingly, as noted by Alexei Găină, Ion's name does not appear in any of the general lists of students for the university -perhaps as a form of censorship, but it can not be certain. At the school, however, he did create the Association of Students from Bessarabia. In the end, he graduated from the university in 1911 with a first-class diploma and a recommendation for a teaching position.

== Early career ==
In 1912, upon graduating, he was hired as a teacher at the Kuzmina Real School, which was a private general education school. During his time in St. Petersburg, while working there, he lived on Malîi Boulevard, no. 11. He also started working scientific papers during this time in the fields of physics and meteorology like Crookes tube and the Doppler effect among other studies. In 1913, he was hired as a mathematics teacher at the private commercial school Tutorskaia. At the same time, he was a Privatdozent (as a private lecturer) in mathematics and astronomy.

Returning to his previous position, he also started practicing journalism during the years 1913–1914, mostly through collaboration with science popularization magazines like Vestnik Znania. However, he still did not make much, and as a means of earning an additional income, he started taking on more teaching jobs. He was approved to teach at the State Commercial School, which was established by the First Teachers' Union, taught at the private girls' gymnasium Makarova, and also taught accounting courses, which was also established by the union. After getting his PhD in 1915, Inculeț worked as a physicist at the Meteorological Observatory, while at the same time, he wrote for the Basarabia newspaper of Constantin Stere.

== Political career ==
=== February Revolution and Petrograd ===
After the start of the February Revolution, which sought to end the Russian Empire and the monarchy, Inculeţ, who was a supporter of socialist ideas, joined the Socialist Revolutionary Party. He was elected as a member of the city council of Petrograd (after St. Petersburg had been renamed to Petrograd), the Petrograd Soviet, as a member of the party. According to his own recollections, his own focus was on deepening the revolution in other areas of the former empire (mostly Bessarabia), and he organized a delegation to be sent to Bessarabia. Eight would be sent from each county that had taken part in the revolution to explain what it was, which he called the liberation of language, land, and nation, which was approved by the Chairman of the Russian Provisional Government, Alexander Kerensky. In August 1917, he arrived with the Moldovan delegation to Bessarabia and participated in the Congress of Peasant Deputies. He was then appointed Assistant Government Commissioner of Bessarabia. During the start of October, he addressed the deputies, stating that Bessarabia should remain part of Russia during the October Revolution, in which the Bolsheviks seized power from the ruling Provisional Government. He was then placed first on the list of candidates for the Russian Constituent Assembly by the deputies, but was expelled from the Socialist Revolutionary Party.

=== President of the Sfatul Țării ===
He was elected as the president of the first session of the new Bessarabian regional assembly in the wake of the revolution, the Sfatul Țării, in November 1917. This came as a shock, as Ion Pelivan had been the more senior Moldovan national activist, and Pelivan had initially received a majority of the votes, but late during the night it was announced that there was a revision of the presidential proposal. This was due firstly to the deputies seeing that Pelivan would not receive their votes (as Inculeț was a more moderate voice), which was needed to foster unity and for the body to function after it was just created. The minority deputies wanted someone who was a supporter of the revolution and the Russian Democratic Republic. The second reason was that since he was already a Government Commissioner, which represented the Russian state authority, the council hoped to legitimize itself by linking itself to the existing Russian authority and transferring sovereignty over from the Russian empire to Moldova. Pelivan's "godsons", or supporters of his views, opposed saying he was oriented towards the Dniester (due to the Dniester forming the eastern border of Bessarabia, meaning a pro-Russian stance), and whose ideal was a revolutionary Russia, to which Pelivan stated that he was a fine candidate because Bessarabia's future was in the hands of the deputies and not the president and the Sfatul Țării could, with ease, remove him. As Gherman Pântea, the former minister in the Government of the Democratic Republic, and future mayor of Odessa, would later proclaim he stated Inculeț's activity was as follows:

On 21 November 1917 the Country Council was opened, a body that would speak on behalf of Bessarabia and decided its fate. Ion Inculeț was elected president of this parliament unanimously. He met all the qualities to be given this honor: he was calm, skillful, reassuring, and especially extremely patient. (...) Mr. Inculeț in all the circumstances has proved a perfect calm and cold blood. No hasty decisions, no reckless step. The big day was approaching - the day of the Union - but Inculeț was thinking of the peasant's fate. He often said, "If the God would help us with the unification and with the radical agrarian reform, that would mean, to give land to the peasants, I would be the happiest man.

Initially, he was very pro-Russian in policy, as he had been instructed when returning to Bessarabia. Motivated by the October Revolution, which overthrew Kerensky and the economic realities in Bessarabia, his views shifted, and he became a defender of Bessarabia's independence. He then started consistently promoting the national interests of Bessarabia.

=== President of the Moldavian Democratic Republic ===
On 2 December 1917, after a series of nationalist debates, Pan Halippa drafted and read the Țării's proclamation by which Bessarabia became the Moldavian Democratic Republic. Immediately afterwards Inculeț was announced as the country's president, leading to the Governor of Bessarabia, Constantin Mimi, resigning from his post and retiring to his estate. In late December, amid the risk of destabilization due to six Bolshevik committees operating alongside the Board of Directors, a secret meeting was held by the Țării on 14 December authorizing external intervention in order to restore order. Inculeț and Pantelimon Erhan, his prime minister, negotiated with the Odessa Military District due to control over military commands being fragmented as some officers were loyal to the Provisional Government, requesting two Cossack divisions. At the same time, Ion Pelivan sought military aid from a leader of the White Movement (which was the anti-Bolshevik side during the Russian Civil War), Dmitry Shcherbachev, in Iași. This was the moment that the Romanian government got approval from the Allies of World War I to send organized troops to support the recognized authorities. Meanwhile, he and Erhan publicly pretended to opposite the intervention of the Romanians after they were summoned by an ad hoc tribunal.

In January 1918, a dual authority emerged in the Republic, despite him being president. One fraction was loyal to the pro-Romanian side, the Țării, and one fraction was loyal to the Bolsheviks, called the Frontotdel. The Frontotdel began disrupting supply lines to Romania and looting warehouses, and attempted to expel the Țării and arrest them. Under pressure from the Frontotdel, on 6 January 1918, he was forced, alongside Erhan, to send a telegram to Iasi requesting that the Romanian Army be withdrawn from Bessarabia. It was, however, ignored by the Romanian government. On 10 January, Romanian forces crossed the Prut, and on the following day the Frontotdel retreated, ending their brief control of Chișinău. The tribunal investigators who had summoned the ad hoc tribunal fled. The following day, he met with General Ernest Broșteanu in Călărași to discuss the intentions of the Romanian troops, where he requested a 24-hour delay before the Romanians entered and got hold of Chișinău, but he then reported the details to Frontotdel, likely to protect himself. Following this, he faced criticism from the Bolsheviks (who accused him of being bourgeois and counter-revolutionary) and the right-wing landowners led by Pantelimon Sinadino (as they accused him of passing laws inspired by Lenin and Trotsky, mostly because of his agrarian reform).

On 24 January, the Country Council formally proclaimed the independence of Bessarabia with the majority of votes against Russia. On 22 March, the Council of Ministers convened for a session. The session was to discuss the Romanian government's stance on the union of Bessarabia with Romania. A decision was eventually made during the afternoon that the officials present would travel to Chișinău to speak with the Romanian government. The following day, 23 March, he met with the French ambassador, Charles de Beaupoil, comte de Saint-Aulaire, who was also the Ambassador to Romania. Saint-Aulaire agreed that the union should take place and asked him to make it go by as fast as possible. On that same day, the Council of Ministers made a recommendation that the issue of the union of Bessarabia with Romania be sent to the Țării. Subsequently, he departed to Chișinău alongside Daniel Ciuguraenu to speak with the representatives there. He arrived there for the conference on 26 March to meet, along with then Prime Minister of Romania, Alexandru Marghiloman, to prepare for the vote on approving the Union of Bessarabia with Romania.

The following day, on 9 April [O.S. 27 March] 1918, the majority of the Țării proclaimed the republic's unification with Romania. Ion delivered the welcoming address for the parliament, stating to the deputies that it would be a historic session for the nation. Of the deputies in the parliament, 86 voted in favor, 3 against, 36 abstained, and 13 were absent. This came after existential threats from the Bolsheviks, and because the country had no effective army to control its own territory, the pro-union factions stated that they needed to join the stable Kingdom of Romania or otherwise be absorbed. The next day, he brought the Act of the Union to Iași to hand it over to King Ferdinand I. By royal decree on April 9/22 1918, Ferdinand ratified the union.

=== Minister for Bessarabia ===
Following the union, he left the post of President of the Sfatul Țării, and instead was appointed Minister of State for Bessarabia to Romania's Council of Ministers under Marghiloman, technically as a minister without portfolio. He appointed Colonel Vladimir N. Sachelarie as his deputy for the office, with Sachelarie receiving direct orders from him and contributing to the implementation of directives concerning local military issues. Constantin Stere was appointed as his successor as president of the parliament on 2 April unanimously. Ion had previously approved of Stere, supporting the decision of the Moldovan Bloc to elect him as a deputy to the parliament, whom he had previously called a martyr of the Tsarist regime.

During this role as delegate minister, he was engaged in agrarian reform to address land redistribution and peasant rights in Bessarabia. He was an advocate for larger land allotments for sustainable peasant households, critiquing practices elsewhere in the country, especially in Bukovina, stating that he objected to small plot sizes, free-market land purchases that inflated prices, and excessive retention limits for large landowners. He argued that peasants needed the land as they generated more diverse and valuable goods, and rejected any forced consolidation (comasare) of small farms, believing there needed to be peasant autonomy. Instead, he believed that large estates needed to be phased out and trust-building with the peasantry instead.

On 2 May 1920 he resigned under pressure from the general congress and the new Alexandru Averescu government. He returned to the post in January 1922 when he was appointed by the PNL, or Liberal, government, which caused some discontent among the Liberals as Daniel Ciugureanu had wanted the role for himself.

=== The PȚB and party leadership ===
Following the union with Romania, Bessarabian politics struggled with regional identity and the larger, national system. On 23 August 1918, he was one of the founding members of the Bessarabian Peasants' Party (PȚB), a regional Bessarabian party brought together by its anti-Bolshevik stance. During the founding assembly, he was elected to the Central Committee. A year later Artur Văitoianu approached the party wishing to run as a candidate in the upcoming elections for Ismail County and join their party or otherwise he would run as an Independent. Although this was favored by co-founder of the party, Pan Halippa, Inculeț immediately rejected him. This is thought to foreshadow the conflict between the two as the first incident that would lead to factions in the party. This was due to Inculeț and his supporters in the PȚB, which were more Liberal orientated and sought power through establishing an alliance with the National Liberal Party (PNL), opposing co-leader Halippa's faction, which was more Conservative and wanted to merge with the Peasants' Party (PȚ) to create a unified agrarian peasants movement.

After the election was held either way, Alexandru Vaida-Voevod became Prime Minister representing the Romanian National Party (PNR). The PNR had previously entered into a majority coalition with the major establishment parties of Great Romania, which became known as the Parliamentary Bloc. When Vaida-Voevod was elected, he ushered in Inculeț to keep his position as Minister of State for Bessarabia alongside Halippa in his cabinet, and Pelivan became Minister of Justice.

However, not long after, the Vaida-Voevod government collapsed due to his radical approach to land reforms that made King Ferdinand dissolve his government in March 1920. Internal divisions amongst the PȚB started to emerge and threaten a split within the party after Vaida was ordered to step down, and Alexandru Averescu extended an offer for the populist mass movement party he led, the PP, to merge with the PȚB before the early elections that would have to be called. Inculeț accepted this, but the rest of the PȚB did not and threatened his expulsion from the party. Instead of an early election due to the dissolution, King Ferdinand suspended the parliament, which gave Averescu the time to negotiate a new majority in the chambers. This led to the Parliamentary Bloc coalition ending before the new elections in late May, and Averescu became prime minister, putting Inculeț and his party into the opposition. Inculeț was placed in a precarious position because he had previously maintained his role as Minister of State for Bessarabia in the previous six governments, but the general congress could not overlook the incompatibility with his being part of the opposition. This forced Inculeț to resign from Averescu's cabinet on 2 May 1920. Inculeț himself had not wanted to do so: he had always wanted governmental roles and the gaining of power.

In July, Ion I. C. Brătianu of the PNL extended a merger with Inculeț's faction of the PȚB, which he remained evasive on. Inculeț's faction of the PȚB favored keeping independence for the party instead of a merger. However, he did remain somewhere favorable towards the PNL in Bessarabia, and speculation grew that he was sympathetic and aligned himself with the PNL. When Constantin Stere attempted to get admission into the party, Inculeț firmly opposed it even after Stere had won a parliamentary seat in the February 1921 by-election. Inculeț was resigned to this, signaling disapproval but understanding it was popular within the rest of the party to accept Stere. When Stere's adherence to the PȚB was up for validation in the parliament after he won his seat, a scandal erupted when he vetoed his adherence and resisted his integration, which Halippa had wanted. The parliament still validated the election despite his insistence, citing its limited authority to judge such political actions. This led to a deep divide between Inculeț and Halippa, which almost split the party in two, with rumors that Inculeț and his faction were going to detach themselves and not pursue a PT merger that had been favored by Halippa.

A party congress was held in May 1921 to clarify the PȚB's stance on a merger with the PȚ, a national Romanian peasant's party, which Inculeț refused to attend and explicitly stated his faction would split from the party if such a merger with the PȚ happened because he favored the Liberals. Due to this, Halippa attempted to compromise by reaffirming the PȚB's independence, but stated the party would explore forming a unified PT across Romania, while also at the same time, the press reported that the PNL might collaborate with the PȚB if it came to power (hinting at a realignment with Inculeț). An emergency meeting was held by Halippa to resolve internal ambiguity in July. At the meeting, Inculeț advocated for collaboration with the PNL, which Halippa strongly opposed, citing the meetings in May. Following this, eleven deputies of the party, including Halippa, committed to pursuing national unification and adhering to the PȚ, excluding Inculeț.

After Halippa and his faction formally adhered to the PȚ on 18 July, leading to the absence of his faction in the party for some time to negotiate with the PȚ. With Halippa gone, Inculeț convened a controversial meeting on 22 July, in which the committee claimed that the parliamentarians under Halippa had formally joined the PȚ (despite them only adhering to the party, not formally joining it), Inculeț and the committee thus voted to exclude them and replace Halippa's allies with loyalists, and Inculeț became president of the party. Inculeț's faction then launched a press campaign against Halippa, calling him politically incompetent. After Halippa organized his own separate congress in November, which had wider regional representation with most delegates except for Cetatea Albă and Ismail, Halippa extended an invitation for Inculeț to attend and instead sent Anton Crihan as his representative, with Crihan announcing the split was irreversible and there could be no reconciliation between the two.

Ahead of the March 1922 elections, Inculeț appropriated the party's electoral symbol of the scythe and the rake, aligned the party with the PNL, and branded itself the "Independent Peasants’ Party of Bessarabia". Allied with the PNL, although Inculeț was unable to dominate the elections to control the assembly, the allies resorted to state pressure, censorship, and electoral manipulation. However, despite these tactics, the gains were very small. Inculeț and the PNL won 13 seats, with the PȚ securing 11, including Stere's list defeating Inculeț's in Bălți. The results were seen as a setback for the new government of the PȚB under Inculeț since they could only win two more seats. In October, Inculeț set up a new Central Committee which was loyal to him, which prominently did not include Pelivan or Crihan as they opposed a merger with the LIberals following the March elections. The opposing camp, in turn, convened their own committee, where they voted to formally expel Inculeț for betraying party interests and acting as agents for the Liberals, and voted to sever all collaboration with the PNL government. However, Pelivan's faction represented a majority within Inculeț's party, and so the action was more symbolic and decisive as they gravitated towards Halippa's camp. However, Pelivan did expose a secret meeting that Inculeț had with PNL leader Brătianu, where they negotiated terms for collaboration, which Pelivan used to accuse Brătianu of trying to undermine an independent PȚB.

Finally, on 20 January 1923, Inculeț convened another committee with delegates from only three departments: Chișinău, Tighina, and Orhei. They unanimously approved a merger with the PNL, and Inculeț was chosen to replace Ciugureanu as head of the PNL in Bessarabia. With Inculeț joining the PNL, this marked an end for Bessarabia's regional parties.

=== The PNL and interwar years ===
==== Minister of Health ====
In June 1927, the PNL regained power with Barbu Știrbey becoming prime minister. Initially, Știrbey chose Nicolae L. Lupu as his Minister of Health and Social Protection, but just 2 days later, after choosing him on 6 June, he replaced him with Inculeț. However, Stirbey later resigned after his just two weeks in favor of his brother-in-law Ion I.C. Brătianu. Ion I.C. Brătianu, keeping in line with Știrbey's choices, kept Inculet as Minister of Health. After Ion died while serving in the post of prime minister, his brother and co-leader of the PNL Vintilă I. C. Brătianu took power, and kept Inculet in power. His term ended after Iuliu Maniu became prime minister on 9 November 1928, and the National Peasants' Party (PNȚ) gained power, which was a merger involving the PNR and PȚ in 1926.

According to newspapers at the time, Inculet was portrayed as emotionally intelligent, and this was effective, since it was uncommon to assign ministers based on "stereotypes". However, through ministerial decrees, it can be seen that he ordered the health authority to sample water and document sanitary conditions to the public. He supported the Romanian Doctors' Association, and extensively praised his predecessor, Gheorghe Gh. Mârzescu, who had served as the first Minister of Health from 1922 to 1923 in another of Ion I.C. Brătianu's cabinets. During his time there, the Ministry of Health also started to expand from a relatively small office after the Chamber of Deputies passed a law transferring the National Office for War Invalids, Orphans, and Windows from the Ministry of War to the Ministry of Health.

==== Return to PNL leadership in Bessarabia ====
Following his post as Minister of Health, Inculet returned to becoming the head of the PNL in Bessarabia and strengthening its position there. When the right-wing splinter group, the National Liberal Party–Brătianu (or Georgists), split from the PNL he denied rumors that he intended to join them, and reaffirmed his loyalty to the Liberals. However, while the PNL was wary about King Carol II returning to power with some calling it a constitutional coup because he weakened the parliament of Romania, Inculet stated that they did not oppose him while also emphasizing that the king reigned but did not govern so he must act as a neutral arbiter.

In 1931, he led a campaign through the area to assess local needs, particularly in Lăpușna County, where he conducted questionnaires on village conditions to focus on issues that the PNL needed to adopt. Eventually, in December, he led a large consultative meeting where he noted the PNȚ was weak and internally divided, and extensively criticized the ruling Iorga cabinet for "poor planning" and lack of foresight leading to a growing budget deficit. He confirmed that the PNL would shift to full opposition against the ruling government. In August 1932, he announced that he was concerned about the Soviet–Polish Non-Aggression Pact, questioning whether it weakened Romania's alliance with Poland, as their alliance with Poland had previously been a defense strategy against the Soviet Union and without it would leave Romania more exposed. He criticized Vaida-Voevod, who had become prime minister, for giving vague reassurance about it but failing to address the implications of it.

==== Various ministries and Duca ====
In November 1933, Carol II appointed Ion Duca as Prime Minister to prepare for the upcoming elections and stabilize the country amid the growing influence of extremist movements like the Iron Guard, a fascist and ultranationalist organization. Following this, Duca appointed Inculet as Minister of the Interior.

On 30 December 1933, after Duca presented the election results to the king, he was assassinated by the Iron Guard. Afterward, a state of siege was declared as approved by Inculet and censorship was applied on 30 December 1933 following a Council of Ministers meeting, allowing for the expansion or reduciton of martial law zones until 16 March 1934. All public officials who were "affiliated with terrorist political groups" were suspended, a State Defense Law was to be drafted, and the Ministry of Education was tasked with enforcing the regulation of student associations. Under the decree, military authorities assumed full control over public order, including having the right to dissolve gatherings, conduct searches, and impose press censorship.

In March 1934, he approved a bill that was submitted to amend articles of the 1929 administrative law, which he stated was in order to simplify, introduce authority, and ensure continuity. The bill was eventually passed as the Law for the Defense of Public Order, which would allow for the dissolution of any political groups that prepared or committed any act of violence, but the king allowed the Iron Guard to continue. However, martial law continued despite calls from the opposition like Brătianu, with Inculet responding that exceptional measures were necessary for maintaining order during the current times. Later on, in an address to the prefects from across Romania, he stated that martial law would soon be lifted in January 1935, but focused more son on reforms to police law and allowing the appointment of licensed jurists as officers and called on prefects to lead a national agricultural offensive in rural Romania.

On 4 January 1936 the Ministry of the Interior he headed was defined under the "Law on the Organization of the Ministry of the Interior". The law stipulated the official mission of the ministry was the general administration of the country and the defense of public order. In addition, some of the newer institutions were attached to the ministry, including the National Office of Tourism, General Institute of Statistics, Office of Radio Broadcasts and Cinematography, and the National Office for the Defense of the Population against Air Attacks. After 14 March 1936, the legal validity of the martial law would expire, to which Inculet's ministry announced they would not renew it and instead pause it briefly from 14 March to 4 April. Critics accused Inculet of doing this to wait until Parliament would close its session so that no debate could occur, and that he would then reintroduce the exception measure by decree-law without debate from parliament.

Following a cabinet reshuffle in August 1936, Inculet became the Vice President of the Council of Ministers.

=== After the Union ===
After the Union, Ion Inculeț was minister of Bessarabia, minister of public health, minister of interior, minister of communications and the vice-president of the Council of Ministers in the Government of Romania, led by Gheorghe Tătărescu (1933–1937).

On 22 October [O.S. 9 October] 1918, Ioan Simionescu proposed Inculeț to be a member of the Romanian Academy and he was elected as a full member on the meeting which took place the following day. His inaugural speech was named "Space and time in new scientific light" and it talked about the importance of Einstein's 1916 Theory of Relativity.

Together with Pan Halippa, Inculeț founded the Bessarabian Peasants' Party, which militated for land reform in Bessarabia. In 1923, his wing of the party joined the National Liberal Party.

== Personal life ==
He was married to Princess Roxana Cantacuzino. His children from this marriage were Ion I. Inculeț, Doctor Honoris Causa of the University of Western Ontario (Canada), NASA consultant, Honorary Member of the Romanian Academy, director of the Center of Applied Electrostatics of the University of Western Ontario, and his brother, George I. Inculeț.

Inculeț died from a heart attack on 18 November 1940 and was buried at the Bellu Cemetery in Bucharest. At the funeral, a speech was given by Vasile Bârcă, who said: "What characterizes Ion Inculeț’s life and work is his endless modesty and gentleness, his thorough preparation, accompanied by the tact and calm that characterizes him, above all, his warm love of the people, the country, and Bessarabia. of his native, whom he loved with all the powers of his mind and soul." The remains of Inculeț and his wife were moved to Bârnova on 7 June 1942. Their tombs are inside the Bârnova Saint John the Baptist Church (built 1942–47), located on the outskirts of Iași.

== Gallery ==
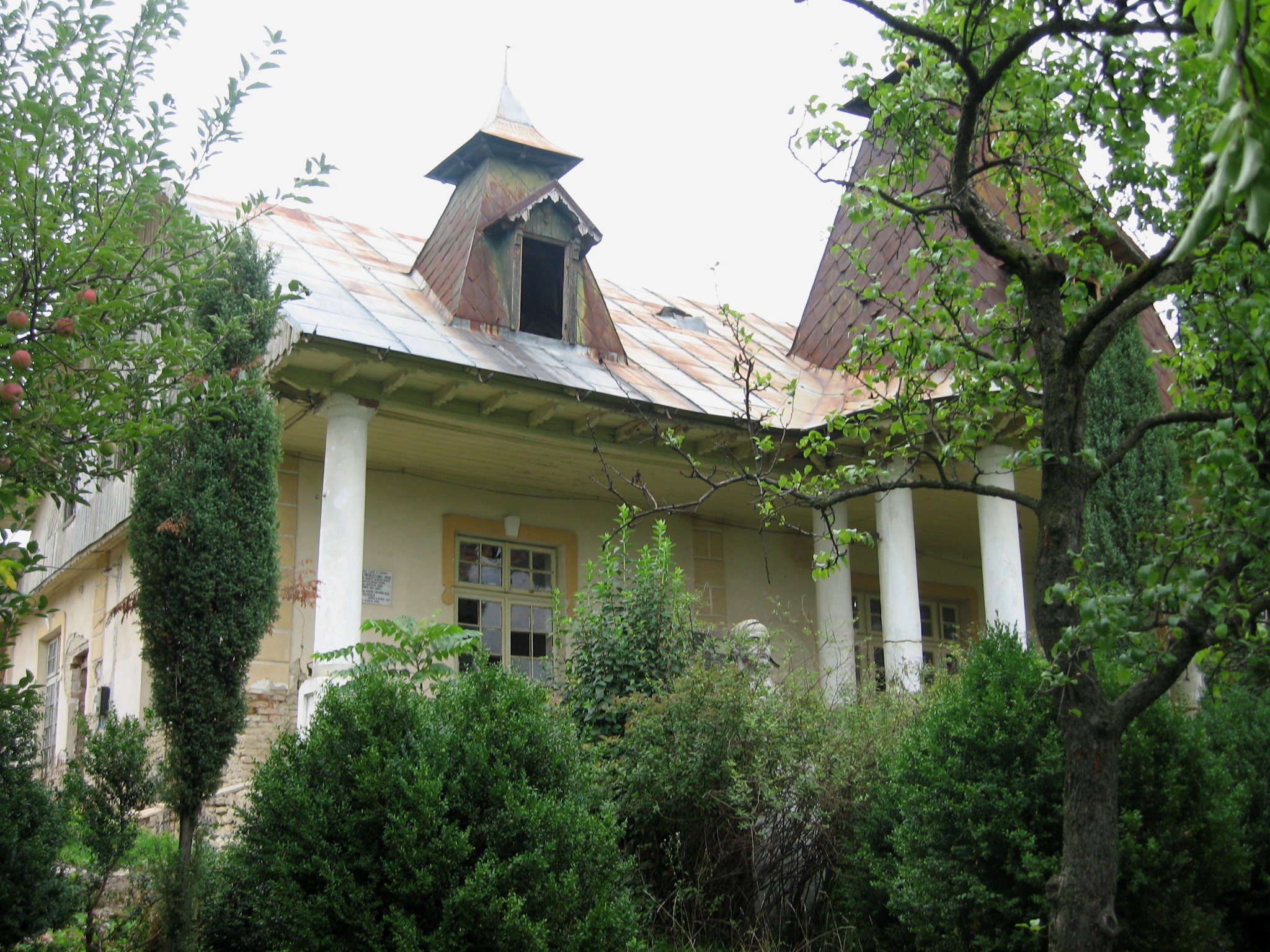
The house of Ion Inculeț in Bârnova

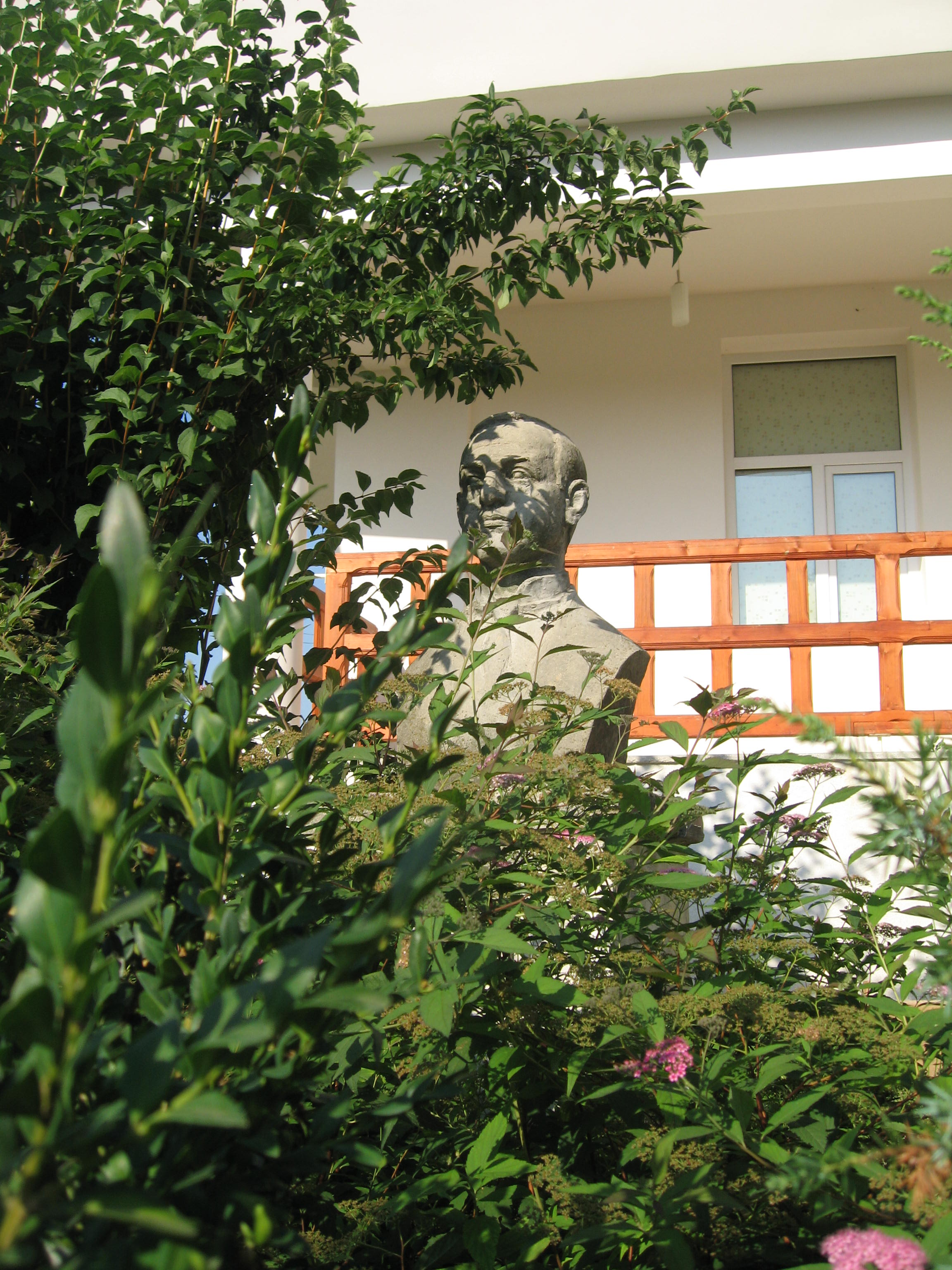
The statue of Ion Inculeț in Bârnova

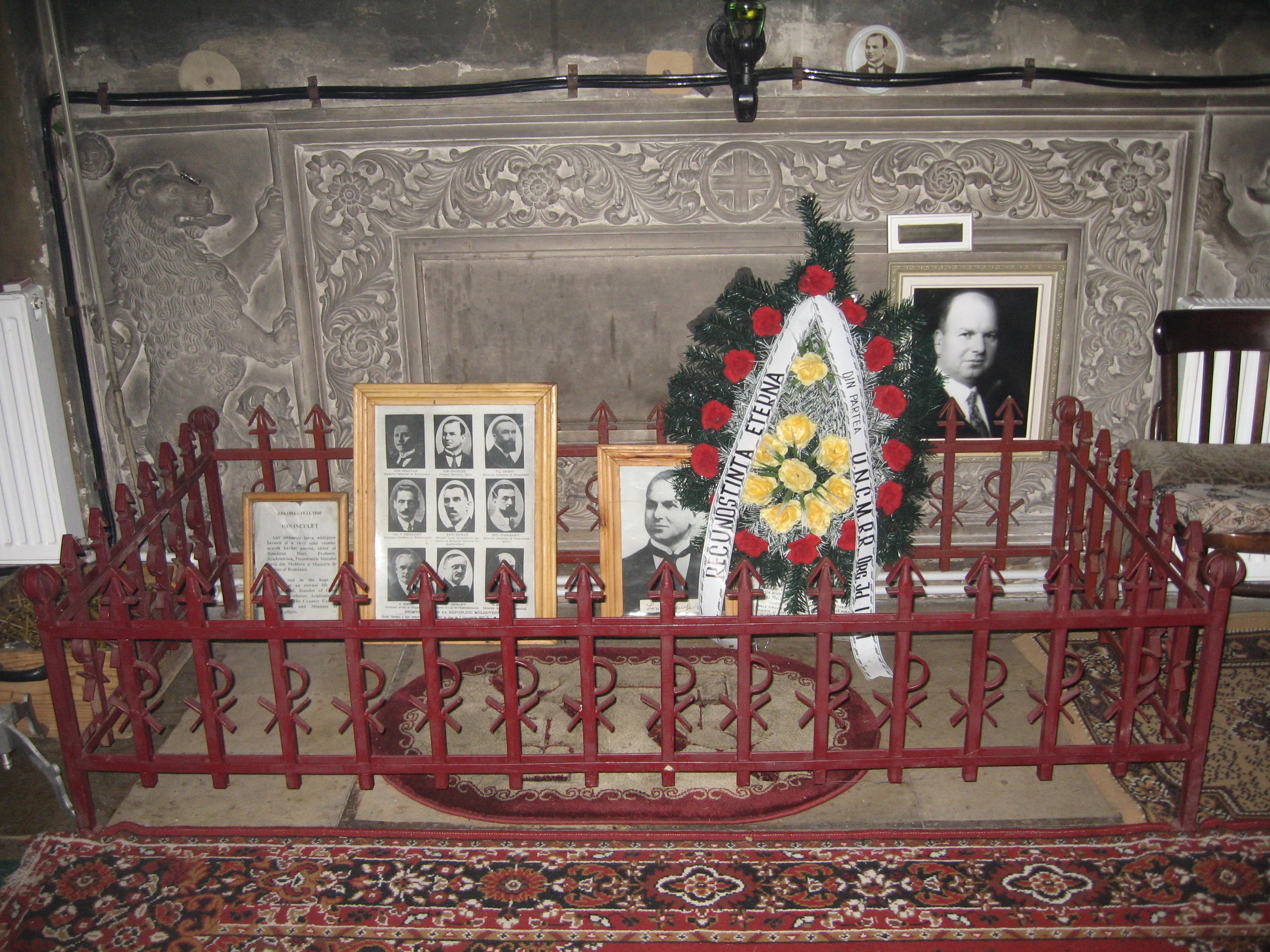
The tomb of Ion Inculeț inside the Bârnova church

== Publications ==
- Popular works on physics’ and astronomy in the magazine Scientific Review, Sankt-Petersburg (1911–1916);
- Space and time in the new scientific light (Bucharest, 1920);
- Ma première rencontre avec Saint Aulaire (1930) – in French language;
- U.R.S.S. (Bucharest, 1932);
- An experienced revolution / Ion Inculeț. [composed by Ruxandra Mihaila]. Chișinău: Universitas, 1994.

Preceded by formation of republic	President of Moldavian Democratic Republic; 15 December 1917 - 9 April 1918	Succeeded by Union with Romania
