= Axinte Frunză =

Russian-born Romanian Latinist, politician, translator, and prose writer (1859–1933)

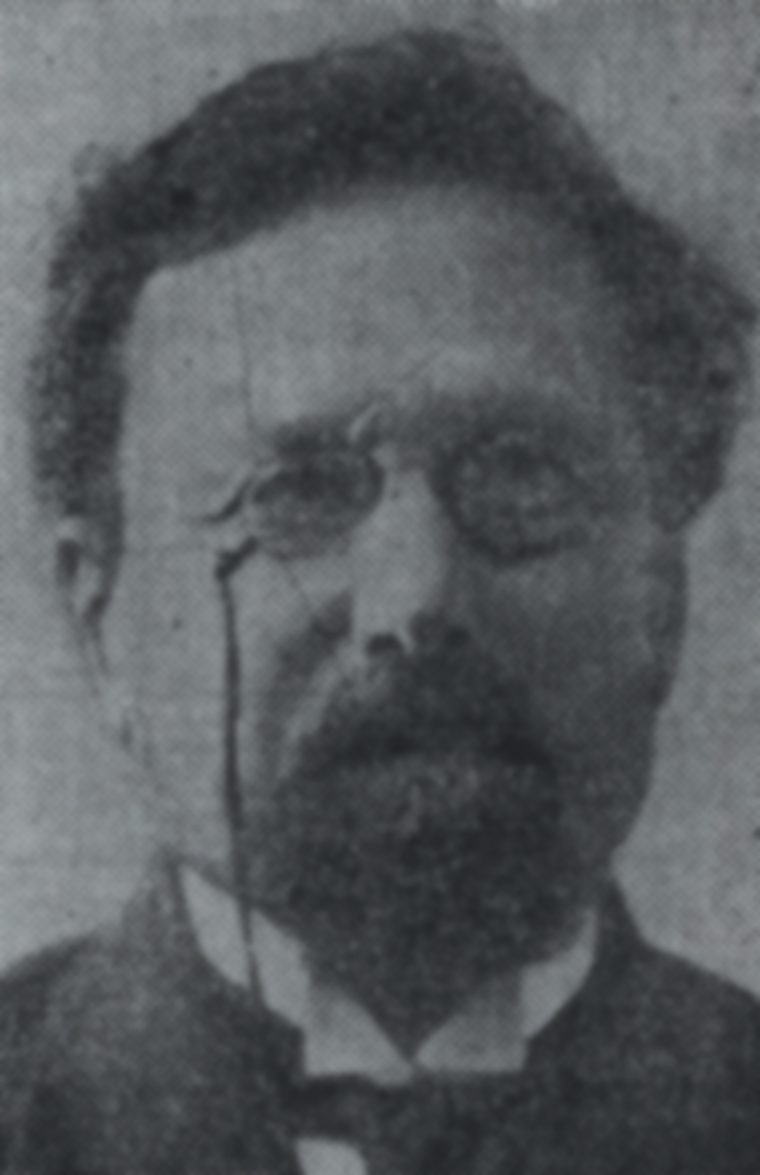
- Frunză's portrait photograph, c. 1920
- Born: 13 February 1859; Scorțeni, Orgeyevsky Uyezd, Bessarabia Governorate, Russian Empire
- Died: 9 June 1933 (aged 74); Bucharest, Kingdom of Romania
- Occupations: Schoolteacher, translator, classical scholar, journalist, factory worker, entrepreneur
- Writing career
- Period: c. 1890–1933
- Genres: Sketch story, novella, travel literature
- Literary movement: Social realism

Axinte Frunză, first name also spelled as Axente, Axentie, Axenti or Auxentie (Russian: Авксентий Дмитриевич Фрунзе, romanized: Avksenty Dmitriyevich Frunze; 13 February 1859 – 9 June 1933), was a Bessarabian-born Romanian socialist militant and classical scholar, also noted as a schoolteacher, translator, and fiction writer. Originally a subject of the Russian Empire, he studied at Kishinev Theological Seminary, where he showed promise as a reader and speaker of Latin; embracing Romanian nationalism and rebelling against Tsarist autocracy, he was ultimately expelled from the institution. Frunză probably graduated from another school or university before settling in the Kingdom of Romania. He joined efforts with other radical emigrants in smuggling books across the Russian border, and, while in Northern Dobruja, set up his own agricultural co-operative. He identified as a Marxist, but remained an unusually radical one in the Romanian context, favoring "scientific communism" and justifying peasant revolts, though in conjunction with nationalist ideals. Frunză was therefore close to the doyen of Romanian anarchism, Zamfir Arbore, as well as to scholar Bogdan Petriceicu Hasdeu, a proponent of left-wing nationalism. At the height of his conflict with the National Liberal establishment in the 1900s, he was also an active member of the Conservative Party.

Frunză passed a state examination that entitled him to teach Latin in Romanian schools. He made his major career move in 1897, when he began working at Negruzzi Boarding School of Iași—afterwards integrating fully within Iași's left-leaning elite. He was well-liked by his students, among whom were several who later achieved fame as writers. In addition to his pedagogical skill and his familiarity with the classics, he was admired for his skill in translating Russian literature, which was a second profession for several decades of his life. He similarly turned to writing his own works of fiction, steeped in social realism and well-reviewed by contemporary critics. As an affiliate of the Viața Romînească circle before and after World War I, Frunză antagonized public opinion through his Germanophilia, identifying the Central Powers as Bessarabia's would-be saviors; though he lived during the union of Bessarabia with Romania, he was jaded by the outcome. Always an eccentric man-about-town who enjoyed social drinking, he attracted suspicion for his political activities. He and his wife Zoe harbored militants of the Romanian Socialist and Communist Parties in their home, supporting their activities. He lost his home during an unrelated legal battle, and moved to Bucharest, where he eventually died of angina. Many of his literary works were collected for print, but remained unpublished.

== Biography ==
=== Early life and Romanian arrival ===
The future activist hailed from free peasants (răzeși), with family roots planted in the former principality of Moldavia. He was born at Scorțeni on 13 February 1859, though some records had 1860; the village was back then part of Russia's Bessarabia Governorate, as organized since 1812. According to statements by himself and by others who knew him, his more junior relatives included Mikhail Frunze, future leader of the Red Army. In addition to showing a natural talent for the study of classical languages, young Frunză was a radical opponent of Tsarism. While a student at the Orthodox Seminary in Kishinev (Chișinău), he enraged the authorities by tearing down and trampling upon a portrait of Alexander II. In 1878–1879, alongside Filip Codreanu and C. Ursu, he formed a left-radical or plainly Narodnik circle, also joined by Petru Frățiman and Is. Fuchs. It was kept under watch by the imperial police, and ultimately dissolved itself during a wave of arrests.

It is not precisely known what happened next: his friend Petru Cazacu suggests that he fled retribution by immediately crossing into the Kingdom of Romania, and this variant is also taken up by historians such as Artur Leșcu; an Okhrana informant claimed that during October 1879 Frunză, Ursu and Codreanu were at the "socialist congress" in Iași, alongside fellow Bessarabians like Zamfir Arbore and Victor Crăsescu. Various biographies report that he only emigrated after receiving his graduation diploma at a lyceum in Nikolayev (Mykolaiv) or Odesa, or at Kiev University. Upon settling in Romania, Frunză earned his living through manual labor, first as a farmhand in Northern Dobruja, where he reportedly set up the first local agricultural co-operative. He continued to test the patience of Russian officials by organizing a network of book-smugglers, transporting socialist or simply Romanian-language texts into Bessarabia. His two helpers were fellow exiles Codreanu and Crăsescu, while his inspiration was Nikolai Sudzilovsky (known locally as "Doctor Russel").

A lifelong friend of the Marxist doyen Constantin Dobrogeanu Gherea, Frunză was among the first Romanians to fully embrace this ideology, going as far as to preach in favor of "scientific communism" (while also continuing to call for "national liberty"). He nonetheless built a very close connection to anarchists such as Arbore, being described by Cazacu as an "individualist and misanthropist" in his overall approach to life. By May 1890, Frunză had enlisted at the University of Bucharest Faculty of Letters, and was also a member of the Bessarabian Mutual Aid Society. In these twin capacities, he signed his name to a defense of Arbore against allegations published by a "Mr Manicea of Tulcea". He supported himself by working at a kefir factory in Bucharest, where he read out Latin literature while overseeing the curdling process, "covered in droplets of milk from head to toe"—and ruining a coat presented to him as a gift by a physician friend, Lazăr Dicescu.

In September 1890, after having received his certificate of graduation, Frunză became the inaugural headmaster and teacher of Latin at Tulcea's gymnasium. He taught there to 1894; while in Tulcea, he also met fellow schoolteacher Zoe Polihron (born 1870 in Slatina), who became his wife. Axinte also became active as a businessman, forming a company that bottled and sold kefir out of Northern Dobruja. His scholarly talent was rewarded with a noticeable delay, and only after he was allowed to present himself for a state examination, which he passed with top honors. The examining commission, presided upon by historian Bogdan Petriceicu Hasdeu, was reportedly stunned by his ability to not just converse in Latin, but also to alternate between the rhetorical styles of Cicero, Tacitus, and Livy.

Axinte and Zoe moved out to Râmnicu Sărat or Buzău, where Axinte had a teaching position until 1897, when he moved to the Negruzzi Boarding School of Iași. He only took his own graduate diploma in philology during 1896. In 1898, Axinte Frunză involved himself in a national controversy, after supporting the socialist Peter Alexandrov, who had been jailed for his activities. He signed his name to a publicized letter of protest, alongside Arbore, Hasdeu, Dobrogeanu Gherea, Constantin Stere and Vasile Kogălniceanu, obtaining Alexandrov's acquittal. At Iași, Axinte and Zoe joined a thriving socialist group of intellectuals; additionally, Frunză earned admiration from academics, with Hasdeu, Alexandru Philippide and Izabela Sadoveanu all describing him as one of Romania's leading Latinists.

=== Iași period ===
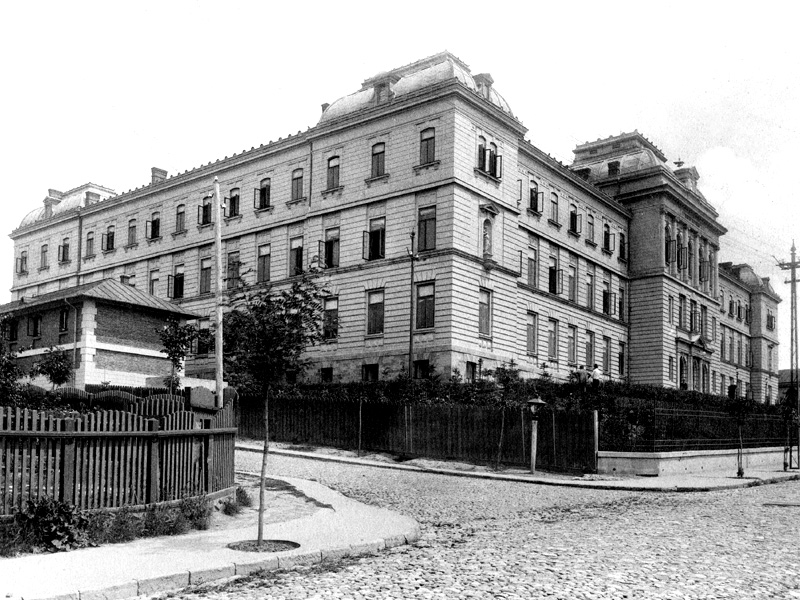
Negruzzi Boarding School, c. 1905

Journalist Constantin René Ghiulea refers to Frunză's "superior art" of teaching and his "wonderful humor", which gave his listeners insight into a skeptical worldview; students reportedly welcomed him initially as a "levelheaded man" who "does not mess about with empty talk". As a Negruzzi alumnus, Eugen C. Crăciun recalled that Frunză was both affable and distant, that he never laughed and only rarely smiled, and that he liked to keep his private life entirely out of the classroom. According to this source, he encouraged children to pursue their literary talents, and was pleasantly impressed to hear Emanuel Ciomac, the future academic, read out his rendition of Horace. His other pupils included poet Demostene Botez, who rated his lessons in Latin as one of his most beautiful experiences of childhood. Other students, both in the same class, were humorist Păstorel Teodoreanu and violinist Ionel Ghica. The latter once tricked his teacher into believing that he had no memorizing skills for learning mandatory lines from the Aeneid; this worked until Frunză angrily witnessed Ghica performing Robert Schumann by ear. Păstorel saw Frunză as a Classical Athenian "dressed up as a modern professor", indifferent to most student pranks, and overall lost among his contemporaries. One hoax was perpetrated by one of the National College, who entered the classroom where Frunză was lecturing and pretended to be a British visitor; Frunză believed him, asking his class to behave, warning them that they were being assessed by a foreigner. He was unpersuaded that he had been duped even after the principal, Mihai Tomida, decided to punish the offending student.

Frunză was for a while a teacher of Latin at the Humpel Institute for Girls, where he was remembered as lenient and congenial—allowing his pupils to sing, or regaling them with anecdotes about Catullus and Lycoris the mime. Though he had achieved a high standing through his Latin-focused education, he privately preferred Ancient Greek literature to its Roman equivalent, as he felt the latter was written by "ruffians". His teaching methods gave rise to controversy after his death. A Negruzzi alumnus, the future linguist Iorgu Iordan, was dissatisfied with his methods, noting that he had failed to learn proper Latin while at Negruzzi. By contrast, journalist Mihail Sevastos recalls that he was properly taught by Frunză during his final school years. As he reports, he and his class had originally studied under Frunză's friend Calistrat Hogaș, who had never tried to teach them Latin beyond vocabulary skills. Frunză, who cultivated egalitarian values and allowed his class to call him frate ("brother"), was nevertheless the first to teach them Latin syntax.

Frunză himself acknowledged that, once he became aware of the Bessarabian exiles' irrelevancy on the political scene, and of Romania's political culture (which he regarded as decadent and money-driven), he lost interest in even making Romanians aware of their irredenta. A nationalist reviewer, Onisifor Ghibu, argued that this attitude, which he sees as defeatist and self-indulgent, effectively delayed the advances of pan-Romanianism before World War I. In 1900, Frunză was safely counted among the democratic-minded, formerly socialist teachers, who stood up against conservatives affiliated with Junimea. Around January 1902, he himself made a turn to the right, obtaining membership in the Conservative Party. By July, he was speaking out against the National Liberal Party's program of reforms, as advanced by Education Minister Spiru Haret. As a result, the government newspaper Voința Națională, allegedly spurred on by Haret, described Frunză as the Conservatives' electoral agent, claiming that he had forfeited his teacher's calling. As reported in the Conservative press, his political affiliation resulted in his being removed from the examination board at Negruzzi, though he was mysteriously reinstated in September.

In November 1903, Frunză and his friend Hogaș appeared as Conservative inductees, welcoming the party's leadership for a rally at Iași. He spoke on the occasion, to denounce Haret's educational policies. During the Russian Revolution of 1905, which offered a moment of liberalization, Frunză reconnected with the Romanian Bessarabian elites. According to Frunză's own recollections, he joined Arbore, Hasdeu and Ioan C. Bibicescu in authoring an anti-Russian manifesto that was found alongside revolvers smuggled into Bessarabia (Frunză claims that Arbore negotiated with the Romanian authorities and, upon earning their favors, buried the looming scandal). Through his friendship with Arbore, he entered a polemic between the latter and the editor of a new liberal magazine in Kishinev, called Besarabskaya Zhizn'. The latter's editor, Fyodor Zakharov, was publicly challenged by Arbore to a duel; tragedy was averted only when Frunză, who had been called in as a witness, sent a conciliatory letter to Zakharov. The document was sent in through Zakharov's aide, Alexis Nour, who was impressed by Frunză's erudition; they remained close friends. During the first days of 1906, Frunză was still with the Conservative Club of Iași, and sending his regards to party leader Gheorghe Grigore Cantacuzino. In summer of that year, he was among the political and cultural figures approached by a visiting Bessarabian activist, Ion Pelivan.

Around 1907, the scholar had withdrawn from political affairs, and was dedicating his free time to hiking, especially around the Ceahlău Massif and the other Bistrița Mountains. He confessed to Nour that he sometimes hid himself in his own house, instructing his servant to report that he was off to Paris. In his classes, the Bessarabian exile also made students aware of his own agenda for social change, for instance by describing Romania's agrarian issue as only fixable through a large-scale peasant revolt. As Russian authorities had promised more recognition to Bessarabian Romanians, he asked Arbore for assistance on a project to write textbooks in Romanian, send Romanian books to Bessarabian schoolteachers, and educate the teaching staff on the need to unify the dialects of Romanian. Shortly before World War I, Frunză joined the writing staff at Stere's left-of-center magazine, Viața Romînească—though, as historian Andrei Cușco notes, his views on society were too radical for that group's mainline Poporanism, making him a marginal. He was a contributor until his final year, with colleagues generally referring to him as fratele Axente ("brother Axente"), thus replicating his habit of addressing each one of them as frate.

=== World War I and 1920s activism ===
For the first two years of World War I, Romania preserved neutrality, with public opinion split between Germanophiles, who favored going to war against Russia over Bessarabia, and partisans of war with Austria-Hungary, who prioritized Romanian irredentism in Transylvania. In May 1915, the newspaper Basarabia, put out by Bessarabian exiles in Craiova, announced the formation of a "Bessarabian League", which counted Frunză, Stere, Cazacu, Arbore and Nour as its leading activists—alongside Nicolae L. Lupu and Radu Rosetti. In 1916, Viața Romînească hosted his commentary about the need to incorporate Bessarabia within a future Greater Romania, also discussing the preservation of Romanians in Ukraine. The article, also republished as a brochure, is read by Cușco as evidencing a mixture of Germanophilia and, following Arbore, "a vision that was profoundly anti-statist (with hints of anarchism), populist, and virulently anti-Russian." As summarized by the same author, Frunză attacked the governing classes in both Russia and Romania by resorting to "ethnic primordialism", thus reviving some of the core thesis of his Narodnik youth—and celebrating rural Romanians as the healthy "barbarians" or "savages" from whom social change would eventually come. Cușco proposes that such samples of "organic nationalism [combined with] a social critique" stand out as an "extremely original" contribution among all period documents favoring an alliance between Romania and the Central Powers.

In its more conventionally nationalistic passages, Frunză's brochure discusses Russian imperialism as an existential threat for Romania as a whole, crediting The Will of Peter the Great as a real document of intent. As the author argued therein, Russia stood poised to annex Greater Moldavia and Northern Dobruja regardless of the war's outcome, but, as an "unreformed empire", was thankfully weakened from within. As Ghibu notes, Frunză, Stere and Arbore were all Germanophiles, who expected that Bessarabia would be liberated by the Central Powers, and who recommended a collaboration between the Romanians and the Ukrainians to hasten this outcome. Ghibu cites Frunză with a metaphorical description of Paul von Hindenburg, who was masterminding offensives in the Eastern Theater, as the Romanians' "God" and savior. Another Frunză piece, put out shortly after, talked about the two-party system under which Romania was at the time, and critiqued its stance on press freedom. He earned attention from his colleagues by exposing the hypocrisy of both Conservatives and National Liberals, comparing their advocacy of freedom while in opposition to their actual record in government. The text also mocked Westernization and its by-product, "Romanian democracy", comparing the Romanian society to a case he had witnessed in Buzău—in which one poor student, who had received a new uniform as a gift, had proceeded to terrorize his erstwhile peers.

In addition to Latin, Frunză could speak several of the Slavic languages, and his work included translations from Russian literature. Usually co-authored with Zoe, they include what is rated by critics as Romania's best version of Ivan Goncharov's Oblomov. Seen by critic George Călinescu as definitive evidence of Frunză's "perfect linguistic skill", it was initially serialized in Viața Romînească, in a variant which differed significantly from the volume version, printed later. According to Botez, the alterations made by his editor "took away the stylistic flavor", which was Frunză's forte. Frunză also provided acclaimed renditions of stories by Anton Chekhov (whom, according to Sevastos, he resembled both physically and "in his spiritual makeup"), Maxim Gorky, Vladimir Korolenko, and Semyon Yushkevich. Axinte alone wrote a number of novellas, which operate in the realm of social realism—and which reviewers such as Călinescu describe as "monotonous", but also as high accomplishments in the use of Romanian as a literary language; he also penned sketch stories and travel literature, including his impressions of Mount Athos, which he had visited in 1909. According to Sevastos, these texts reveal him as a keen observer of the "most delicate nuances", "rich in fine, original observations", and still carrying traces of his "Moldavian peasant" background.

The Frunzăs continued to live in Iași during The Romanian Debacle, during which the city remained a provisional capital of Romania, as the southern regions, including Bucharest, had been occupied by the Central Powers. As argued by Ghibu, both Axinte Frunză, like his associate Nour, refused to visit Bessarabia immediately after the February Revolution had again liberalized Russia. Ghibu notes that Frunză never even left Iași, "not even when persistently called over to Chișinău" by the few groups of organized nationalists in the short-lived Moldavian Democratic Republic. The schoolteacher instead welcomed the October Revolution, informing his students about its historical importance. By March 1918, ahead of a temporary truce, he was working on a Romanian grammar for native speakers of Russian, which appeared at Carol Göbl company of Bucharest later that year. As he complained in a letter to historian Ion S. Floru, the edition was egregiously delayed by the National Liberal Alexandru C. Constantinescu of Internal Affairs, who was citing paper shortages as the underlying reason; approval was only obtained after an "intervention" by an influential Bessarabian activist, Pan Halippa. The Armistice of November 1918 eventually restored Romania and extended her borders, leading to the creation of Greater Romania, into which the Moldavian republic was also welcomed. According to Nour, Frunză visited (or planned to visit) the newly acquired region—but was overall jaded, since he believed that Romanian rule had made social injustice more permanent, and since Bessarabian revolutionaries were regarded by him as inauthentic.

=== Final years and death ===
Frunză continued to reside in Iași, where he and his wife focused mostly on socialist agitation. Their home at 36 Sărăriei Street was kept under constant watch by Siguranța agents, which had designated the newly formed Socialist Party and its Studies Circle, with which Zoe was associated, as suspicious organizations. The nearsighted Axinte reportedly spent much of his time outside of the home, on drinking escapades with friends and neighbors such as the physician and fellow writer I. I. Mironescu, as well as teachers Mihai Ștefănescu-Galați and Valentin Bude. He was ridiculed for these adventures, especially after one New Year's Eve when, unable to find his way out of Ștefănescu-Galați's yard, he went around in circles for hours on end, until he was finally rescued by his hosts. The two men and their wives, alongside novelist Mihail Sadoveanu, vacationed in makeshift cabins at Tazlău, where Frunză impressed his colleagues with his unexpected skills as a bricklayer and table magician. Frunză influenced Mironescu's progressive take on society during extensive conversations. In desperation at her husband's absence, Mironescu's wife once created a mock-tavern in her own home on Albineț Street, allowing them to see each other while she was still around. The room featured a bust of Frunză, done in plaster by Mironescu himself.

Zoe still participated in the defense of radical causes, and, as a figure in the "Socialist Red Cross", offered assistance to workers arrested during the general strike of 1920. She and Axinte also offered more direct protection to trade unionists sought after by the Siguranța, whom they sheltered in their home. Zoe joined the Romanian Communist Party (PCR or PCdR) on its creation in 1920, was elected on its regional committee for Western Moldavia in 1922, and remained affiliated with it even after the group as a whole was outlawed in 1924. The Sărăriei house continued to be used as a temporary and secretive base by the local communists, reportedly including Lucrețiu Pătrășcanu. According to Sevastos, Axinte personally agreed to shelter a communist fugitive in the attic, and obtained additional support for him from a local lawyer, Albert Schreiber.

Axinte Frunză was forced into retirement from teaching in April 1926, but was called back during July and allowed to continue until 1932. In mid-1929, he was working on a translation of stories by Chekhov, for which he had signed a contract with Ramuri of Craiova. He was still engaged with this project in early 1931, while also completing a version of Maxim Gorky's My Childhood, which he had purified of Gorky's own additions (while also restoring chapters not found in other translations); he complained to his editor, Ion Simionescu, about how "aggressive capitalism" had undermined his effort. He was no longer directly involved in politics. Botez recalls seeing him and Mironescu as bystanders at political rallies held by either the National Liberals or their National Peasantist rivals. They poked fun at both camps, suggesting that the two camps were equally right to accuse each other of corruption. Frunză began reconnecting with the Bessarabian literary milieu, which was by then shaped by localists such as Nicolai Costenco, who were virulently critical of Greater Romanian centralism. In January 1932, he was announced as a would-be collaborator for Costenco's new literary magazine, Viața Basarabiei. Nour reports that Frunză was by then skeptical about Leninism and the Soviet Union, arguing that he ought to have been there to evaluate the claims made in Soviet propaganda. He remained optimistic about the prospects of Soviet collectivization, ridiculing agribusiness, and insisting that a collectivization program was needed at home.

According to a plea made in court by Ionel Teodoreanu, the Frunzăs were evicted from their house in Iași after an ownership dispute, which had left Axinte distraught. They finally relocated to Bucharest later in 1932—once there, Zoe joined the PCR-led Anti-War Committee, as well as a series of antifascist organizations. As recalled by Călinescu, Axinte appeared to be dissatisfied with the move, and appeared often at Viața Romînească's offices to reconnect with other "Iași deportees". These included former pupils such as Păstorel and Alexandru A. Philippide—Frunză, who appeared generally young and spirited, had some trouble remembering them. Also briefly reunited with his former teacher, Crăciun observed that he regretted having left behind Iași and its joie de vivre, since Bucharest was not a place to "have a glass of wine". The author died in Bucharest on 9 June 1933, from what newspapers initially described as a "congestion of the brain". Mironescu later corrected the record, indicating that his friend had died after his first and only bout of angina. According to Cazacu, he was not known to be ill, but had been greatly affected by Arbore's own death.

== Legacy ==
Axinte Frunză's funeral was held at Sfânta Vineri Cemetery on 11 June 1933. It was attended by "the wife and a few of his friends", including Mironescu, but also by Halippa, the Minister for Bessarabia, who delivered the funeral oration. In an obituary written for Viața Romînească, Păstorel suggested that, especially at a time when "there is not one among us mortals who does not fear catastrophe", the passing of an old man would naturally go unnoticed. He had already been committed to literary memory by his friend Hogaș, appearing as "Mr Arsene" in one of Hogaș's travel accounts, and by Viața Romînească's [Sadoveanu. He features as "Eudoxiu Bărbat" in Sadoveanu's novel Oameni din lună ("Moon-men")—an eccentric, noble and quiet figure, driven to despair by his devious tenants.

Zoe continued to participate in PCR front organizations, though her activity was greatly reduced by illness from 1937. She survived World War II and witnessed the inauguration of a Romanian communist regime, dying on 28 August 1949. A while after, a manuscript comprising her late husband's novellas was assigned for review and printing at Editura pentru literatură, but was probably mishandled, and was viewed as lost by 1969. His recollections of Mount Athos appeared in 2001 as a standalone edition, put out by Bucharest's Anastasia publishing house, and carrying an introduction by Virgil Cândea. In a 2015 overview, literary biographer Nicolae Scurtu noted that Frunză's biography is "insufficiently known even to specialists", that "sometimes erroneous" details had been published in reference works, and that his body of writings remained poorly catalogued.
