= Victor Crăsescu =

Romanian physician, activist, writer (circa 1850–circa 1918)

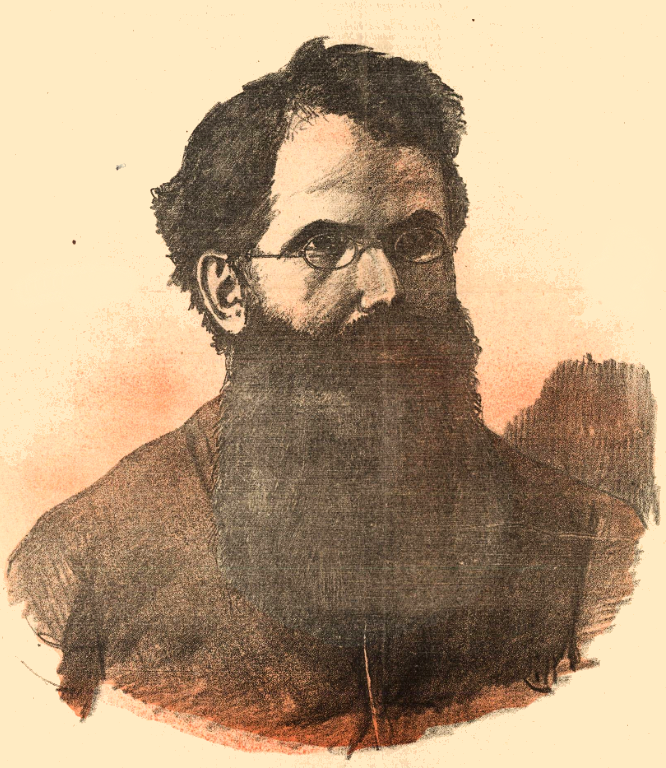
- 1895 portrait
- Born: Victor Crasiuc c. 1850; Kishinev (Chișinău), Bessarabia Governorate, Russian Empire
- Died: c. 1918 (aged 67–70); Slănic?, German-occupied Romania
- Occupations: Physician, farmer, civil servant, spa administrator, translator
- Writing career
- Pen name: Ștefan Basarabeanu, Ștefan Băssărăbeanu, V. Ursu, Ștefan Valahu
- Period: c. 1880–1913
- Genres: Sketch story, novella, social novel, memoir, travel literature, children's literature
- Literary movement: Social realism, Proletarian literature, Naturalism, Didactic art, Contemporanul, Poporanism

Victor Crăsescu (Russian: Виктор Крэсеску) or Crăsescu-Basarabeanu, born Victor Crasiuc (Виктор Крысюк; 16 October 1849 or 1850 – 1917 or 1918), was an Imperial Russian-born Romanian physician, left-wing activist, and prose writer. He was originally from the Bessarabia Governorate, where he grew up as a rebel against Tsarist autocracy; enlisted at Chișinău Theological Seminary, which he greatly disliked, he took his scientific training at Odesa University. At this stage of his life, Crasiuc-Crăsescu embraced Russian anarchism and the Narodnik tradition, which resulted in repression by the authorities. He spent most of the 1870s in exile, visiting Switzerland and the United States. After a brief return to his native land upon the close of the decade, he was again in conflict with the Russian regime. He left a second and final time, taking with him his young son—known to Romanians as Sergiu Victor Cujbă.

By the early 1880s, Crăsescu had made his way into the Kingdom of Romania, and had set up a physician's practice in the coastal region known as Northern Dobruja. He only formalized his training later, by graduating from the University of Bucharest with a focus on pediatrics, and eventually by obtaining a doctorate in medicine. A collaborator of the Marxist doyen Constantin Dobrogeanu Gherea, Crăsescu was also affiliated with the socialist magazine Contemporanul, where he debuted in proletarian literature. He also cultivated Zamfir Arbore, the Bessarabian-born forerunner of Romanian anarchism, and was co-editor of Arbore's Amicul Copiilor—wherein he was himself featured with children's stories. He traveled about the country, involving himself in a labor conflict while tending to the fisherman of Sfântu Gheorghe; he was ultimately dispatched to Prahova County, allowing him to work more closely with Dobrogeanu Gherea. From the late 1890s, he was based in the emerging spa town of Slănic, which became his home to the end of his life (though he also had stints as a country doctor in Predeal and Vărbilău).

Finally naturalized Romanian in 1897, Crăsescu was directly involved in improving the health of his new compatriots, and also campaigned for the introduction of universal suffrage; both he and his son embraced Romanian nationalism, albeit with a left-wing bias—expressed culturally as "Poporanism". With his only fully completed social novel, which appeared in 1899, Crăsescu upset other nationalists by advocating for Jewish emancipation. In 1903, he set up a peasant-focused chapter of the Romanian Red Cross and, under its aegis, founded a rural clinic in Teișani. Crăsescu was the head physician of the Slănic plasă in the early 1910s, during which time he tackled epidemics ranging from typhus and cholera to scarlet fever. He opted to remain in German-occupied Romania at the height of World War I, and tried to contain the typhus epidemic in Prahova; he himself succumbed to the disease, though both the exact year and place of his death remain disputed.

Crăsescu's son made his way back into Bessarabia shortly after its 1918 union with Romania, spending the rest of his life there as a writer and co-operative organizer. Crăsescu, meanwhile, was largely forgotten as an author. The socialist and anti-clerical tinges of his written work allowed for his recovery by the Romanian communist state (created in 1948), and then by the literary establishment of the Moldavian SSR. These regimes also valued him as a luminary in the field of scientific materialism. Within the framework of Romanian literature, he remains noted as a minor, but talented, promoter of naturalism and social realism, the best to have come of the Contemporanul circle.

== Biography ==
=== Early life and career ===
As summarized by scholar Gabriela Drăgoi, the writer's life was "tormented, adventurous, and yet veiled in discretion." Hailing from a family of yeomen (răzeși), he was born "Victor Crasiuc" or "Viktor Krasiuk" in Kishinev (Chișinău), capital of the Bessarabia Governorate. His father, Pavel Crasiuc, was serving in the Russian administration as Collegiate Councillor. Victor celebrated his birthday on October 16, though sources disagree on the exact year, with some using 1849 and others 1850; still others have 1848. He studied at the local theological seminary, an institution of the Russian Orthodox Church, to 1872. In his later writings, he described this institution as run by "robbers", and reported that children were often subject to beatings and other forms of abuse.

Young Crasiuc enlisted at Odesa University, focusing on natural science. He was becoming an affiliate of anarchist and Narodnik circles, all of which were inspired by Mikhail Bakunin. During the clampdown, he was exiled to Switzerland in 1872 or 1873, interrupting his studies. While there, he joined up with his seminary colleague Axinte Frunză, who had similar political convictions; the two of them, alongside Filip Codreanu, organized a smugglers' network, transporting clandestine socialist literature, as well as books written in Romanian, into their native Bessarabia—the operation was masterminded by Nikolai Sudzilovsky, known to them as "Doctor Russel". The future author also traveled to the United States, where he was mainly employed as a farmhand. Around 1875 (the precise date is irretrievable), he fathered a son, known later in life as Sergiu Victor Cujbă.

After returning to Russia in 1878, Crasiuc was among the founders of a Narodnik circle in his native city. He began using the Crăsescu surname, also employing pseudonyms such as Ștefan Basarabeanu ("the Bessarabian"), Ștefan Valahu ("the Wallachian"), and V. Ursu. Accounts differ as to what happened next. One version is that Crăsescu was arrested in 1879, but that he probably escaped during the judicial inquiry, managing to elude the authorities. An Okhrana informant claimed that during October 1879 Crăsescu had joined Frunză, C. Ursu and Codreanu, as well as Zamfir Arbore, for a "socialist congress" held in the Romanian city of Iași. His own son had it that Crăsescu was at Odesa in 1881, and that he only fled Russia upon receiving tips that he was about to be apprehended. He is believed to have taken Sergiu Victor on an extended travel through Austria-Hungary and Switzerland, and perhaps to America. The two eventually settled in the Kingdom of Romania, where Crăsescu was among the founding members of the Prutul Society—joining fellow exile Nicolae Zubcu-Codreanu. While living at Tulcea, in the Danube Delta, where he presented himself as a fully qualified physician, he was attracted into a socialist movement led by Constantin Dobrogeanu Gherea.

Alongside other political refugees, Crăsescu attempted to set up a commune (described as either a phalanstère or an obște) in the fields of Northern Dobruja. He tried to obtain Romanian citizenship as early as 1885, and several times afterward, but his requests failed to gather enough votes in the Assembly of Deputies. In April 1890, he was enlisted at the University of Bucharest medical faculty, signing his name to a letter of support for his professor, Dumitru Sergiu, who was being subjected to a public scrutiny for his activity as a hospital administrator. Crăsescu ultimately graduated with a diploma from that faculty, specializing in pediatrics and publishing his paper on child-rearing in Northern Dobruja (noted on its own for its critique of superstition and traditional medicine). It resulted in him being granted his doctorate in medicine in 1895. As a writer, Crăsescu, who sometimes used the pen name Ștefan Băssărăbeanu, entered the group surrounding Contemporanul magazine. His first published work in that journal, and in all of his career, was the 1883 sketch story, Legea lui Lynch ("Lynch's Law"). Until 1890, Contemporanul was his leading publisher, featuring his most important works of short prose.

=== Amicul Copiilor and Slănic relocation ===
During his return trips to Bucharest, Crăsescu frequented Arbore, the senior anarchist, who was organizing meetings of the Bessarabian exiles from his home on Nerva Traian Street. In 1891, he became director of Arbore's Amicul Copiilor, which stood out as Romania's first-ever children's magazine, of which he was also the co-owner. As "Ștefan Basarabeanu", he published therein children's sketches such as Băețel și cățel ("Boy and Doggie"), and sometimes employed the young Cujbă as editorial assistant. Throughout the interval, Crăsescu was present in the socialist press (Drepturile Omului, Dezrobirea and Lumea Nouă), as well as in Viața Literară and in Bogdan Petriceicu Hasdeu's Revista Nouă. Some of his writings were also picked up by Adevărul, Vatra, Lupta, Noua Revistă Română, and Sămănătorul. In early 1893, he briefly replaced V. Cosmovici on Revista Nouă's editorial board.

Crăsescu was full editor of Amicul Copiilor in 1895, which is recorded as his final year there (though some sources suggest that he had already left in 1894). He had a steady output as both a translator and adapter of Russian literature, including works by Vsevolod Garshin, Nikolai Gogol, Nikolay Nekrasov, Mikhail Saltykov-Shchedrin, and Ivan Turgenev. His sketches and short stories appeared in four volumes during 1893 as Schițe și nuvele; the novel Ovreiul ("The Jew") followed in 1899 or 1900. In 1896, a year after his son's debut as a socialist poet, Crăsescu published in Lumea Nouă his translations from Anton Chekhov. He made a return trip to Austria-Hungary in early 1893, invited by friends he had in Debrecen. This was at the peak of the Transylvanian Memorandum crisis, during which Romanian natives of Transleithania found themselves arrested for their anti-government protest. Asked to comment by the Debreceni Hírlap, Crăsescu indicated that he viewed the Romanians as ill-advised in their activism, and suggested that their leader, Vasile Lucaciu, was overreacting.

The Romanian state employed Crăsescu as a country doctor in Buftea, just north of Bucharest. In October 1894, as a doctoral candidate, he was assigned "sanitary officer" in Sfântu Gheorghe (Caterlez), near Tulcea, and also took over for half of the wards in Sulina's hinterland, or plasă. He was still there in early-to-mid-1895, when, alongside Peter "Doctor Petru" Alexandrov, he helped organize the local fishermen in their conflict with the striking fishmongers. As reported by Adevărul daily, he advised his new friends not to act violently, though his effort was effectively undermined by "Russian spies", including Consul Aristarchi Cilibidachi, who managed to stir up a riot. According to other press reports, Crăsescu was continuously harassed by Romanian officials, who were in turn intimidated by Cilibidachi—including his superiors in the medical corps, who ordered him to explain "why he keeps and distributes among his acquaintances books that are written against the Tsar", and consequently staged a raid on his home. He was fired in July, when his position was filled by G. Ioachimescu, the sanitary officer of Chilia Veche, though the locals tried to appeal the decision. In their letter to government, they recounted that Crăsescu "was very active and had even spent from his own salary to obtain medicine for the more financially destitute."

After another stint in Fierbinți-Dâmbovița, Crăsescu finally set up a practice in Slănic—according to writer Cezar Petrescu, he had been called up to Prahova County by Dobrogeanu Gherea, who was mainly active in the regional capital of Ploiești. At various intervals, Gherea, who was successful as a restaurateur, provided his friend with financial assistance. During the final months of 1896, Crăsescu was present for spiritist ceremonies held at Hasdeu's mansion in Câmpina—alongside chemist Constantin Istrati, dramatist Haralamb Lecca, psychologist Nicolae Vaschide, General Constantin Năsturel-Herescu, and painters such as Nicolae Vermont and Octav Băncilă. By March 1897, he had been sacked from his post at Slănic, and had voiced his protest in a letter he sent to Romania's surgeon general, Iacob Felix. He also continued to practice privately and in November tackled the diphtheria outbreak, losing only one patient to this disease.

Crăsescu was ultimately naturalized on 20 December 1897, after a vote in the Romanian Senate. In September 1899, he was reinstated professionally, being granted a new clinic, in Predeal. He had by then become absorbed by his activities in Prahova: from March 1900, he was the inaugural physician of a new state-sponsored practice in Vărbilău. Expressing his dissatisfaction that the medical establishment was largely indifferent to social hygiene among the peasantry, in July 1903 Crăsescu established a philanthropic society which viewed itself as a rural section of the Romanian Red Cross. Its leading achievement was in establishing an infirmary-and-hospital at Teișani; said to have been ignored by the authorities (despite obtaining a formal pledge of support from Slănic's mayor), this enterprise failed to survive into the next decade.

=== Final years ===
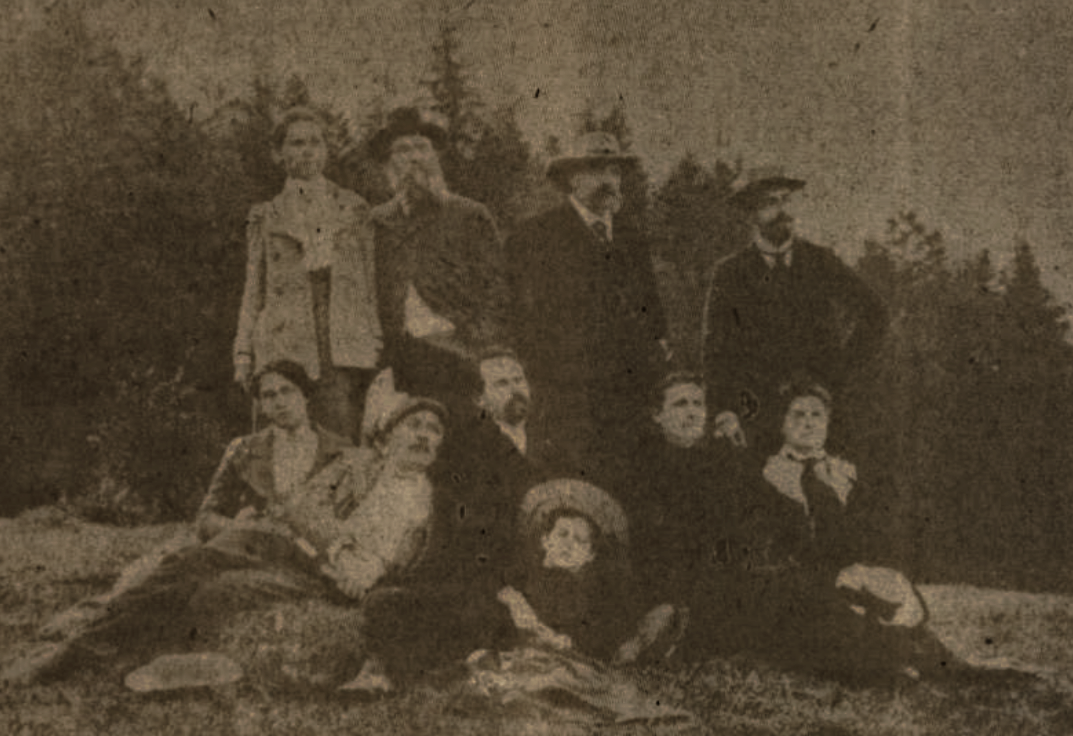
Group photograph showing Crăsescu (bottom row, third from left; to his left is Peter Alexandrov), Vladimir Korolenko (top row, second from left), and members of the Gherea family—including Constantin Dobrogeanu Gherea (top row, third from the left) and his son Alexandru (top row, last on the right)

In August 1903, Vladimir Korolenko, the Russian writer and humanitarian, celebrated his 50th birthday while visiting Crăsescu in Slănic (this reportedly resulted in an "enormous number of congratulatory letters and telegrams" being sent to this address). Cujbă, meanwhile, followed in his father's footsteps as a political activist, returning to Kishinev just after the Russian Revolution of 1905. A comparatively liberal interval followed the revolutionary events, witnessing a flourishing of Romanian nationalism in the Bessarabian province. As reported by the Bessarabian priest Onofrei, from October 1905 Crăsescu's works were being discovered and studied by young people who wished to connect themselves with the "cultural renaissance". In this new climate, Cujbă involved himself with a nationalist newspaper called Basarabia. The Russian regime found his activity unpalatable, especially since he was also a Romanian citizen; this led to his being expelled back into Romania in 1906. In summer of that year, Crăsescu hosted in Slănic the Bessarabian activist Ion Pelivan, who was visiting Romania for the first time.

By April 1908, Crăsescu had been promoted to head physician of Slănic, in which capacity he examined a case of infanticide, performing autopsy on an infant's body that had been fished out of the salt lake at Dorobanțu. He became involved with the campaign for universal suffrage, and in September 1908 organized a rally in support of the concept (it was held in Slănic's central park, and was attended by politician Ion Ionescu-Quintus). During summer 1909, Crăsescu assisted the ad-interim mayor, Titu Slăniceanu, with inspecting the local food industry. He shut down Slănic's central beer garden over health concerns, and confiscated one carload of maize flour, which had spoiled. In mid-1910, Crăsescu was managing one of the two public mineral spas that had been opened in his adoptive town. Also that year, he published his final volume, titled Flori de ghiață ("Flowers of Ice"), with Cujbă credited as a contributor.

Crăsescu was on call in October 1911, when the cholera pandemic reached Prahova. After performing an autopsy on Matache and Sultana Plăieșu, he confirmed the presence of Vibrio cholerae in both cadavers. He then personally organized the quarantine service, isolating four infectious cases at Slănic. In 1913, Crăsescu was still the head physician, and was also assigned to its plasă; in this capacity, he dealt with successive outbreaks of scarlet fever, typhus and diphtheria at Vâlcănești. He was reportedly overwhelmed when the population, still recovering from these afflictions, was hit by typhoid fever. As reported in April by whistleblowers from neighboring Mălăești, the authorities were casually ignoring his efforts, and refused to answer his requests for material aid. In June, he reportedly threatened a local newspaper correspondent not to cover the resurgence of scarlet fever in another one of wards, at Plopeni.

Crăsescu's medical work, as well as his writing on a novel "inspired by the lives of Romanian Bessarabians", were interrupted by a carriage accident which fractured both of his legs in October 1913. Over the following years, and especially after the start of World War I, he evolved into a committed supporter of left-wing nationalism, in the same vein as Charles Péguy. As early as May 1913, he had joined the Cultural League for the Unity of All Romanians, presiding over its meetings of its branch in Slănic.

Crăsescu witnessed The Romanian Debacle of 1916, during which most of the country was occupied by the Central Powers. Under this regime, he tended to the poorest people in Slănic, who were being decimated by typhus; he himself caught the disease, which ultimately killed him. Some confusion endures as to his death: while he is generally assumed to have died in or near Slănic, the death year is given as either 1917 or 1918. His son, meanwhile, had escaped to Western Moldavia, and then to Bessarabia, where he was located during the February Revolution. The events gave impetus to ethnic emancipation within the Russian realm: in March 1917, Cujbă and Pan Halippa assisted in the formation of a Moldavian Progressive Party, based among the Romanian-speaking soldiers and students in Odesa.

== Literary work ==
Crăsescu's work has a "glaring social function", "opening painful wounds" and "joining into a fin de siècle tendency, which directed writers to describe environments that had previously been ignored." It is generally deemed as characteristic of the prose found in Contemporanul—formed on the basis of social realism, with hints of literary naturalism. It was overall lauded in 1895 by the historian and literary critic Nicolae Iorga, who discovered him as the most accomplished Contemporanul author—with Sofia Nădejde as a distant second. As argued by comparatist Zoe Dumitrescu-Bușulenga, of the Contemporanul circle only Crăsescu and Constantin Mille took inspiration from social environments that were not wholly agrarian, and who did not focus their critique solely on the "miserable lives of peasants". He covered a diverse geography: one of his Bessarabian stories is set in Rezina, recounting how a yeoman, Vasilică Topor, exercised his revenge on other villagers by pushing them, and their entire cabin, into the Dniester; in another piece, he describes a beggar's burial at Bucharest's Bellu cemetery. He left two drafts for novels with more distant settings—one described Russia's Narodnik circles, while the other spoke about life in North America.

Historian Flavius Solomon sees Crăsescu as "one of the most important representatives" of Poporanism, which was in part a Romanian localization of the Narodnik literary tradition. Scholar Ștefan Ciobanu observes that the assimilated Crăsescu fit poorly within the Bessarabian literary mainstream, with his work only containing "hints of the discarded province". He shared with other Bessarabians a "spirit of resentment", his own "revolutionary realism" being much like that espoused by Russians such as Gleb Uspensky. According to Drăgoi, the authors he translated, from Gogol to Turgenev and Nekrasov, were also distinctly influential on his prose, as was Guy de Maupassant. However, Crăsescu remained comparatively bad, his "prolix narration" largely infused by "stylistic mediocrity", with an exaggerated focus on "anecdotes and melodrama." A more problematic note, highlighted by Sperantia, was his status as a "dilettante", who, during his years at Amicul Copiilor, still employed "frequent solecisms". According to scholar Petre V. Haneș, Crăsescu had taught himself the Romanian literary vernacular, which differed from his native Moldavian dialect. Philologist Nicolae Mătcaș notes that, overall, Crăsescu argued for the unity of the Romanian language, being implicitly against the standardization of "Moldavian". Mătcaș groups Crăsescu with the Bessarabian authors who recognized linguistic regionalism, appreciated the Slavic layers in Romanian (though short of preserving Cyrillic), and objected to the radical stances of Romanian Latinates.

With Ovreiul, hailed by contemporary critics such as Theodor Cornel as one of the few milestones in the Romanian novelistic genre, Crăsescu produced a social fresco about the Bukovina Jews. They appear only as a backdrop to a larger narrative that also involves their Romanian acquaintances and servants—as Haneș reports, the novelist apparently took no side on the "Jewish Question" as understood by his contemporaries, but rather wanted to show what life was like in the non-fictional town of Gropeni. Contrasting readings were provided by contemporary reviewers: N. I. Apostolescu described Ovreiul as "tendentiously philo-Semitic"; Iacob Negruzzi gave "good marks" to the book's "good and flowing language", but was upset by its portrayal of Romanians as "evil, vitiated, and murderous"—when Jews portrayed therein were "rather abstract beings", "shrouded in a theoretical fog". Literary historian Marin Bucur sees the social novel as "thesist, but sincere", with a genuine endorsement of Jewish emancipation and an implicit condemnation of "blind racial laws".

Sometimes borrowing the conventions of travel literature, Crăsescu specialized in realistic depictions of maritime life in the Delta, pioneering a subgenre later embraced by Ioan Adam and Eugeniu Botez; his narrative method centered on meritorious sailors and fishermen, who stood up to administrative abuse while also presenting their peers with alternative lifestyles, that did not involve alcoholism and moral destitution. Fragments localized in Sulina and Sarichioi describe locals as "tough, unforgiving, battered by wickedness and hazard, indifferently caught up in the game of life and death". A novella of his, titled Spîrca, depicts them as class-conscious and engaged in active resistance against their exploiter. The latter, Iani Milano, also appears in a story by Mihail Sadoveanu, suggesting that he was entirely taken from life. In other short writings, Crăsescu deplored the fate of prostitutes, contrasting their low standing in society with the opulence of an adulterous upper-class, and embraced anti-clericalism, deriding "false piety". He also revolted against the seminaries in memoir-like sketches that described these institutions as permeated by "terror, immorality, and hypocrisy". His approach to this issue made him similar to a contemporary Bessarabian author, Leon Donici-Dobronravov, who was himself a seminary alumnus. Political manifestos take up large portions of his other contributions: Drăgoi argues that Crăsescu's children's stories were especially didactic, and as such off-putting, "losing from the charm that defined some of his debut sketches".

== Legacy ==
Crăsescu's death came just as Bessarabia was in the process of uniting with Romania. Shortly after this had been completed, Haneș spoke publicly at Chișinău people's university, to make locals aware about Crăsescu and Hasdeu's literary contributions. In 1925, Cartea Românească of Bucharest issued four volumes of Crăsescu's stories. Reporting on this release, Mișcarea daily spoke of the author as "forgotten", expressing a hope that the works would be valued by "our current generation of writers." The same was noted by cultural journalist Dumitru Karnabatt, who further argued that Crăsescu's "sincere human emotion" and "social dream", once treasured by adolescent readers, would continue to impress youngsters into the 20th century. The writer-physician was survived by a wife, who was still alive in 1950, and also his son Cujbă. The latter made his return to Bessarabia as a cultural promoter and co-operative organizer; he died there in 1937.

Writing shortly after Romania had been transformed into a people's republic, Petrescu suggested that the "almost forgotten" Crăsescu was compatible with the new realities, and stood to be recovered. He also asked that Crăsescu's wife be granted a state pension provided by the Writers' Union of Romania. In a 1954 piece, physician Iuliu Ghelerter asserted that Crăsescu, alongside Nikolai Sudzilovsky, Nicolae Zubcu-Codreanu, Alexandrov and others, had at once helped along the workers' movement in Romania and introduced the country to the "advanced medical science of Russia"—itself shaped by "materialist, democratic-revolutionary philosophers." In 1967, poet Eugeniu Sperantia looked back on the literature produced by Revista Nouă, suggesting that such pieces, including Crăsescu's stories, had once been fashionable—but also that they were unlikely to align with contemporary tastes. Crăsescu's name was invoked during a 1979 between literary critics Nicolae Manolescu and Dimitrie Păcurariu. The latter rejected Manolescu's verdict, namely that "Bassarabeanu" need not have been featured in the core biographical dictionary of Romanian literature. According to Păcurariu, Crăsescu was still notable as Romania's "first author of worker-themed novellas".

The writer's memory was upheld in the Moldavian SSR, namely the larger portion of Bessarabia, integrated within the Soviet Union after a takeover in 1940. In 1956, the Romanian Academy answered a request made by its Soviet counterpart, and issued a Crăsescu bibliography. In January 1963, at the height of de-Stalinization, scholar Ion Vasilenco published an article that praised various left-wing nationalists of the previous century, including Crăsescu and Arbore, as dedicated to constructing a "better and more luminous world". The main focus was on the more controversial Constantin Stere, which resulted in Vasilenco being labeled and isolated as insane.

Crăsescu's complete works appeared at Chișinău's Cartea Moldovenească in 1974. A decade later, Perestroika reforms tolerated the rise of culturally separatist movements in the Moldavian SSR, though these were now divided on the issue of ethnic identity. By 1988, Crăsescu and other writers were invoked as forerunners by Valeriu Harea of Moldova Socialistă, who argued that Moldovans were fully distinct from Romanians; the same newspaper published a rebuttal by Mătcaș, who noted that Harea's argument rested on omitting mention of Crăsescu's actual views on national identity. Before and after the dissolution of the Soviet Union, Crăsescu's activities as a Bessarabian-born doctor were the subject of research papers by Eugen Popușoi. His effort allowed for Crăsescu to be reconsidered and recovered in post-Soviet Moldova.
