= Arbore (surname) =

Arbore is a Romanian surname that may refer to the following notable people:

- Ecaterina Arbore (1873/1875–1937), Romanian, Soviet, and Moldovan communist, daughter of Zamfir
- Ioan Arbore (1892–1954), Romanian major-general
- Luca Arbore (died 1523), Moldavian diplomat, and statesman
- Nina Arbore (1889–1942), Romanian painter and illustrator
- Renzo Arbore (born 1937), Italian television host and singer
- Zamfir Arbore (1848–1933), Romanian political activist
