= Scorțeni =

Scorţeni may refer to:

- Scorțeni, Bacău, a commune in Bacău County, Romania
- Scorțeni, Prahova, a commune in Prahova County, Romania
- Scorţeni, Teleneşti, a commune in Teleneşti district, Moldova

== See also ==
- Scoarța, name of two villages in Romania
