= Arbore (disambiguation) =

Arbore is a commune in Romania. Arbore may also refer to

- Arbore Church in Arbore Commune
- Arbore (surname)
- Arbore people, an ethnic group in southern Ethiopia
  - Arbore language
