= Nina Arbore =

Romanian painter and illustratress (1889–1942)

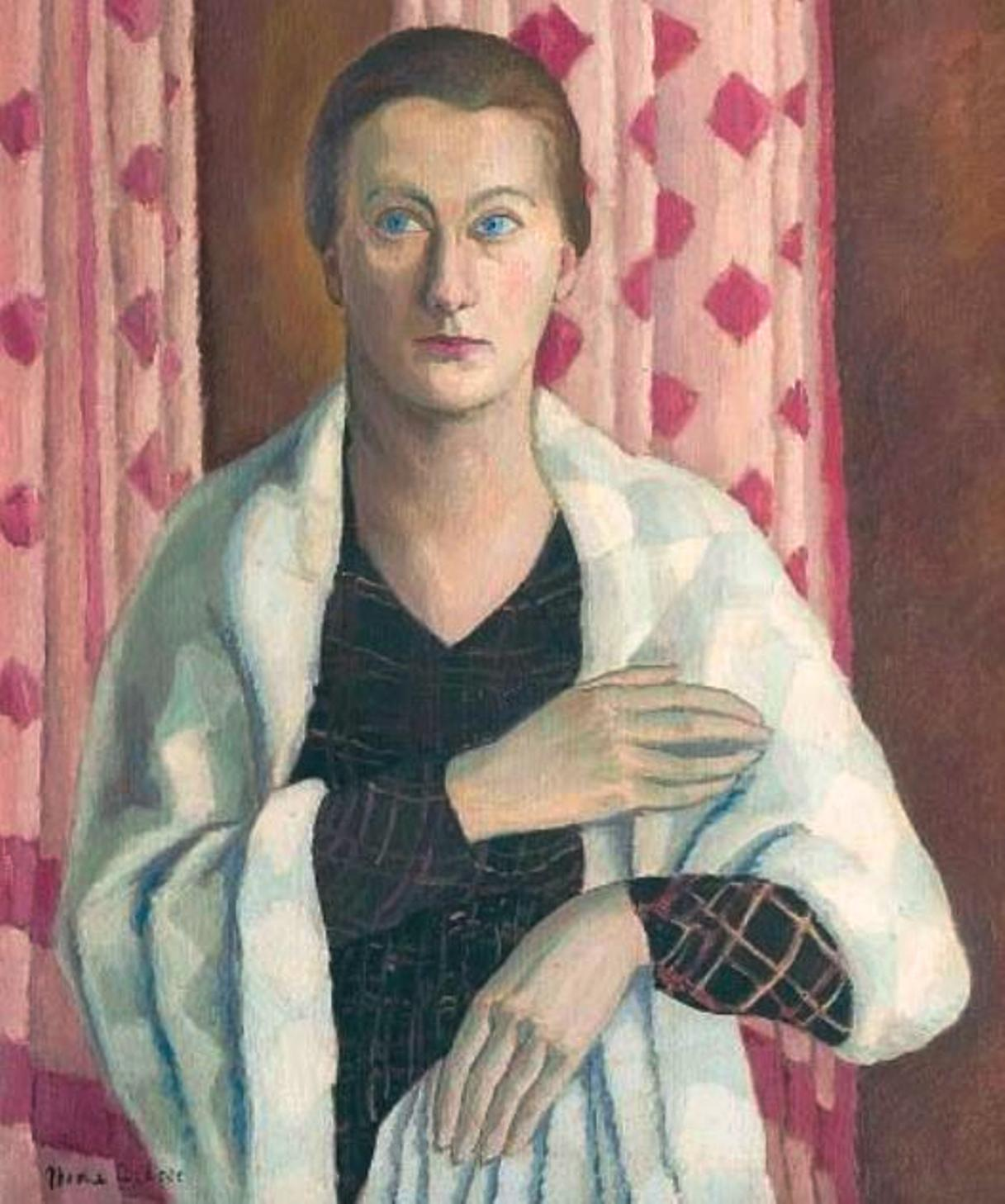
- Self-portrait (1937)
- Born: October 8, 1889; Tecuci, Kingdom of Romania
- Died: March 7, 1942 (aged 52); Bucharest, Kingdom of Romania
- Education: Academy of Fine Arts, Munich
- Awards: First class prize at the 1929 Barcelona International Exposition

Tamara Nina Arbore (October 8, 1889 – March 7, 1942) was a Romanian painter and illustrator, known for her still-lifes and portraits.

== Life and work ==
Her father, Zamfir and older sister, Ecaterina were both well-known political activists. She took her first art lessons from Nicolae Vermont while she was attending the public schools in Bucharest. In 1906, she enrolled at the Women's Academy of the Munich Artists' Association, where she studied with Angelo Jank. After completing her studies, she went to Paris, where she found a position in the studio of Henri Matisse.

Upon her return to Bucharest, she held her first personal exhibition there. Together with her friends, Cecilia Cuțescu-Storck and Olga Greceanu, she formed what was known as the "Grup al celor trei doamne" (Group of Three Ladies), as a counterweight to the "Grupul celor patru" (Group of Four), consisting of Nicolae Tonitza, Francisc Șirato, Ștefan Dimitrescu and Oscar Han. In 1916, her group became the founders of the "Asociația femeilor pictore și sculptore" (Association of Female Sculptors and Painters), which was sponsored by the Romanian royal family.

Many of her paintings were bought by Alexandru Bogdan-Pitești, a noted critic, poet and art collector, who wrote extensively about her work, comparing it to classical Byzantine art and the works of the Quattrocento. She was awarded a first-class prize at the 1929 Barcelona International Exposition.

Her reputation was enhanced by a series of social-awareness themed engravings and illustrations done for the magazine Cuvântul Liber during the thirties. Her drawings also appeared in România Muncitoare.

In addition to her canvases, she provided decorations for the Church of Saint Constantine and Elena in Constanța and the Church of Elijah the Tishbite in Sinaia. For many years, she participated in exhibitions held by the fine arts society of Bessarabia. She was also a teacher at the "Academy of Decorative Arts", founded by M. H. Maxy. Following her sister's execution in 1937, she retired from public life. Her death appears to have been the result of an accident.

== Selected paintings ==
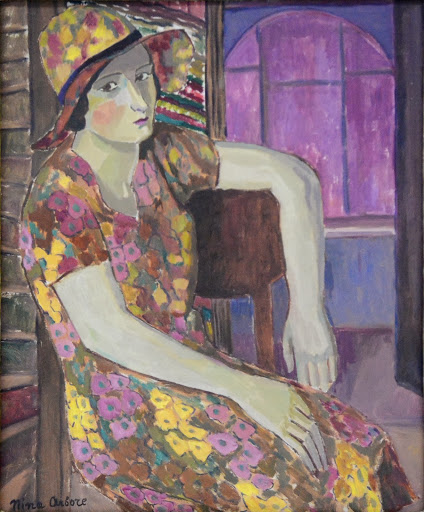
Portrait of a Woman

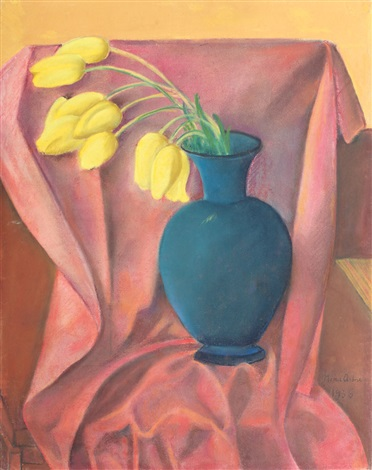
Yellow Tulips

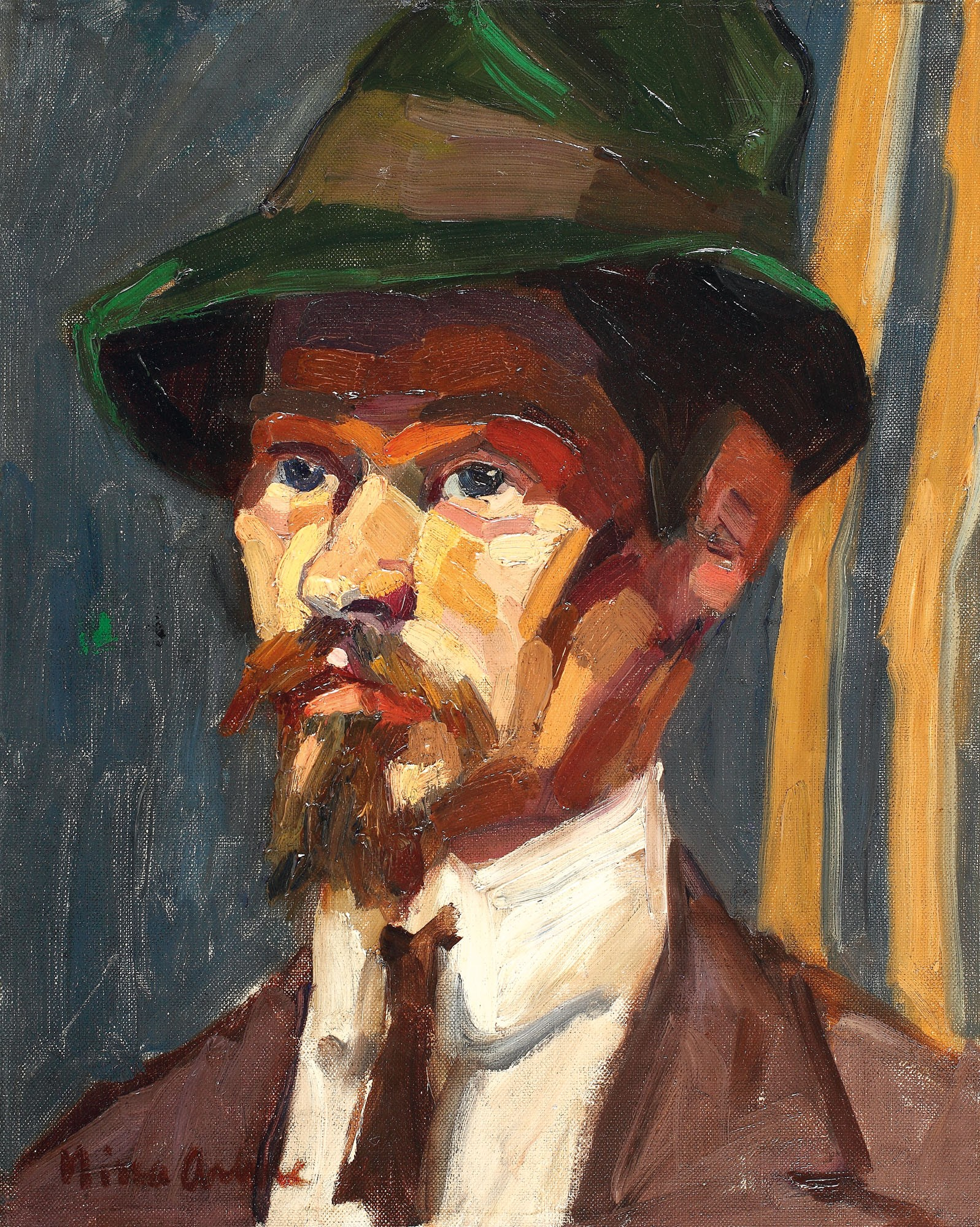
Portrait of her brother, Dumitriu

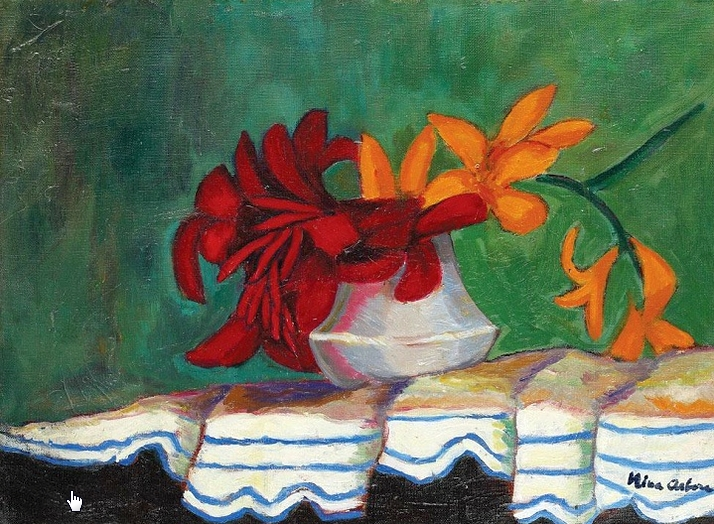
Vase with Lilies

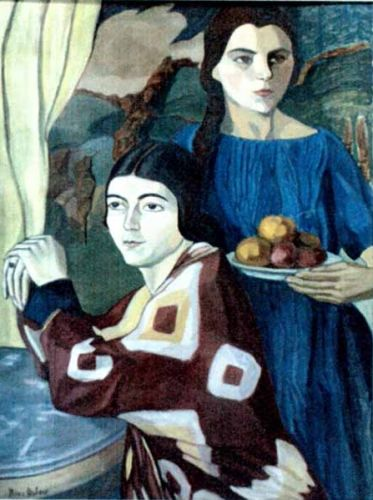
Two Sisters
