= Zamfir Arbore =

Romanian political activist (1848 - 1933)

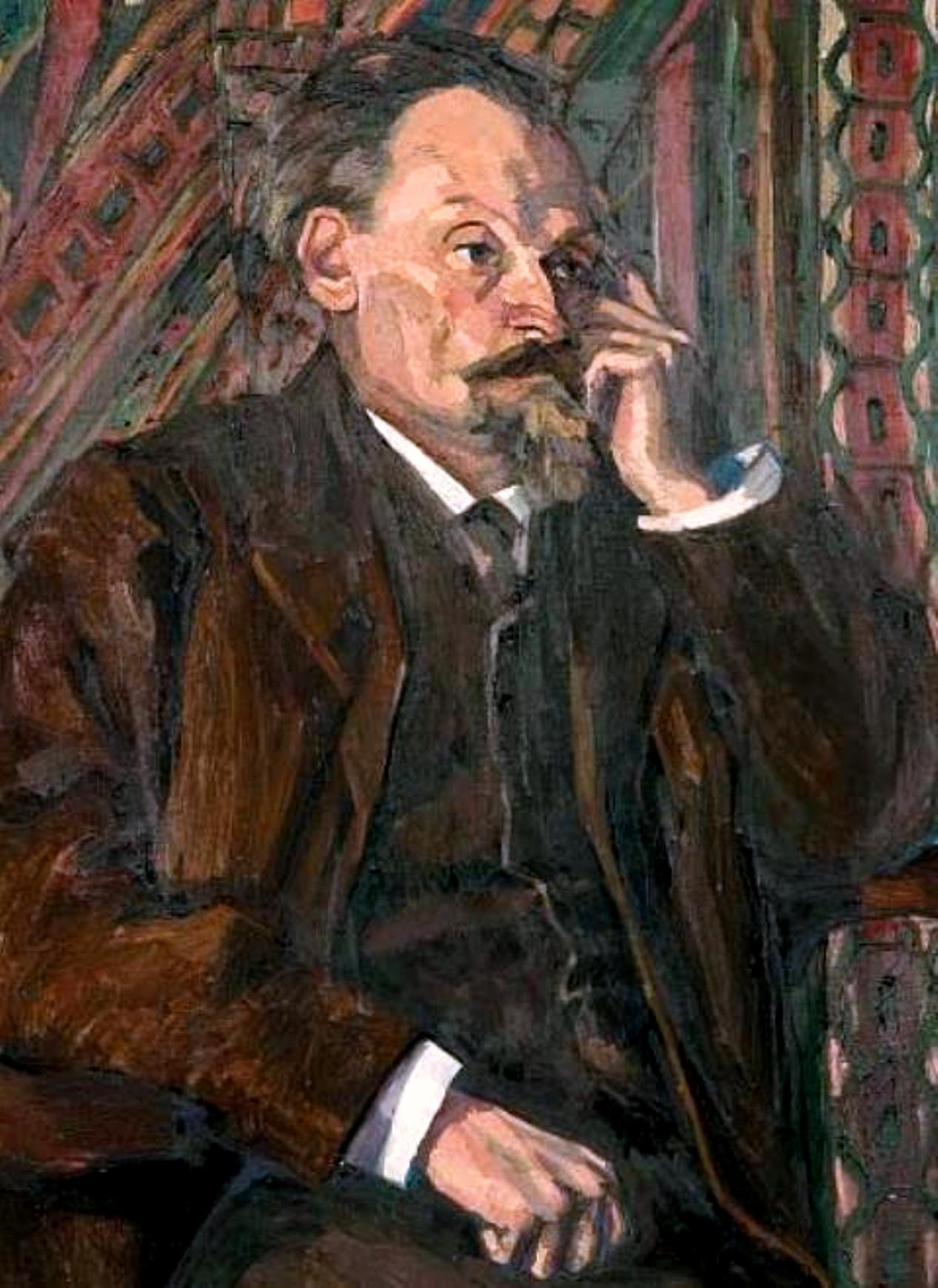
- Arbore's portrait, painted by his daughter Nina, ca. 1914
- Born: 14 November 1848; Chernowitz, Duchy of Bukovina, Austrian Empire
- Died: 2 April 1933 (aged 84); Bucharest, Romania
- Other names: Zamfir Arbure, Zemphiri Ralli, Z. K. Ralli, Aivaza

Academic background
- Influences: Mikhail Bakunin, Karl Marx, Élisée Reclus

Academic work
- Era: 19th and 20th centuries
- School or tradition: Anarchist, Narodnik, Socialist
- Main interests: ethography, sociology, social geography, economic geography, political geography, philology, popular history, Slavic studies
- Notable works: Basarabia în secolul XIX (1898); Dicționar geografic al Basarabiei (1904)
- Influenced

Senator of Romania
- In office 1919–1922

Personal details
- Party: People's Party (1920–1922); Peasants' Party (1919–1920); Social Democratic Workers' Party of Romania (1893–1900)

Zamfir Constantin Arbore (Romanian pronunciation: [zamˈfir konstanˈtin ˈarbore]; born Zamfir Ralli, Russian: Земфирий Константинович Арборе-Ралли, Zemfiriyi Konstantinovich Arborye-Ralli; also known as Zamfir Arbure, Zamfir Rally, Zemphiri Ralli and Aivaza; 14 November 1848 – 2 or 3 April 1933) was a Bukovinian-born Romanian political activist originally active in the Russian Empire, also known for his work as an amateur historian, geographer and ethnographer. Arbore debuted in left-wing politics from early in life, gained an intimate knowledge of the Russian revolutionary milieu, and participated in both nihilist and Narodnik conspiracies. Self-exiled to Switzerland, he became a member of the International Workingmen's Association. Arbore was mostly active as an international anarchist and a disciple of Mikhail Bakunin, but eventually parted with the latter to create his independent group, the Revolutionary Community. He was subsequently close to the anarchist geographer Élisée Reclus, who became his new mentor.

Arbore settled in Romania after 1877, and, abandoning anarchism altogether, committed himself to the more moderate cause of socialism. His campaign against Russian despotism also led him to champion the cause of freedom for Bessarabia region, to which he was personally tied by his family history. These commitments resulted in Arbore's outside support for the Russian Revolution of 1905, when he and Petru Cazacu founded the Swiss-based Basarabia newspaper. Arbore had by then earned academic credentials with his detailed works on Bessarabian geography, and, as a cultural journalist, cultivated relationships with socialist and National Liberal activists. He was also notoriously the friend of poet Mihai Eminescu in the 1880s, and worked closely with writer Bogdan Petriceicu Hasdeu during the 1890s.

During World War I, Zamfir Arbore provoked controversy when he supported a Romanian alliance with the Central Powers, justified in his opinion by a need to liberate Bessarabia. Despite this, and although he publicly welcomed the October Revolution, Arbore was reintegrated into the political scene of Greater Romania, serving two terms in Senate. Before his death in 1933, he was drawn into agrarian and cooperativist politics, and was successively a member of the Peasants' Party and the People's Party. Arbore was survived by his two daughters, both of them famous in their own right: Ecaterina was a communist politician and physician; Nina a modern artist.

== Biography ==
=== Origins and early life ===
Zamfir Ralli was the scion of boyar aristocracy from the principality of Moldavia: his paternal grandfather Zamfirache Ralli was an ennobled Greek merchant, married into the local Romanian elite; Zamfir's mother was an ethnic Ukrainian. Although cosmopolitan, the future activist always prioritized his Romanian roots, changing his birth name to Arbore (var. Arbure) in the belief that his Romanian ancestors had inherited the name and boyar status from the ancient Arbore family. Zamfirache's son Constantin, the friend of poet Alexander Pushkin, was reputedly adopted by Dimitrie Arbore. He also inherited the Ralli family mansion, a Bessarabian manorial estate in Dolna, which in the 1820s had served as the Pushkin's vacation house.

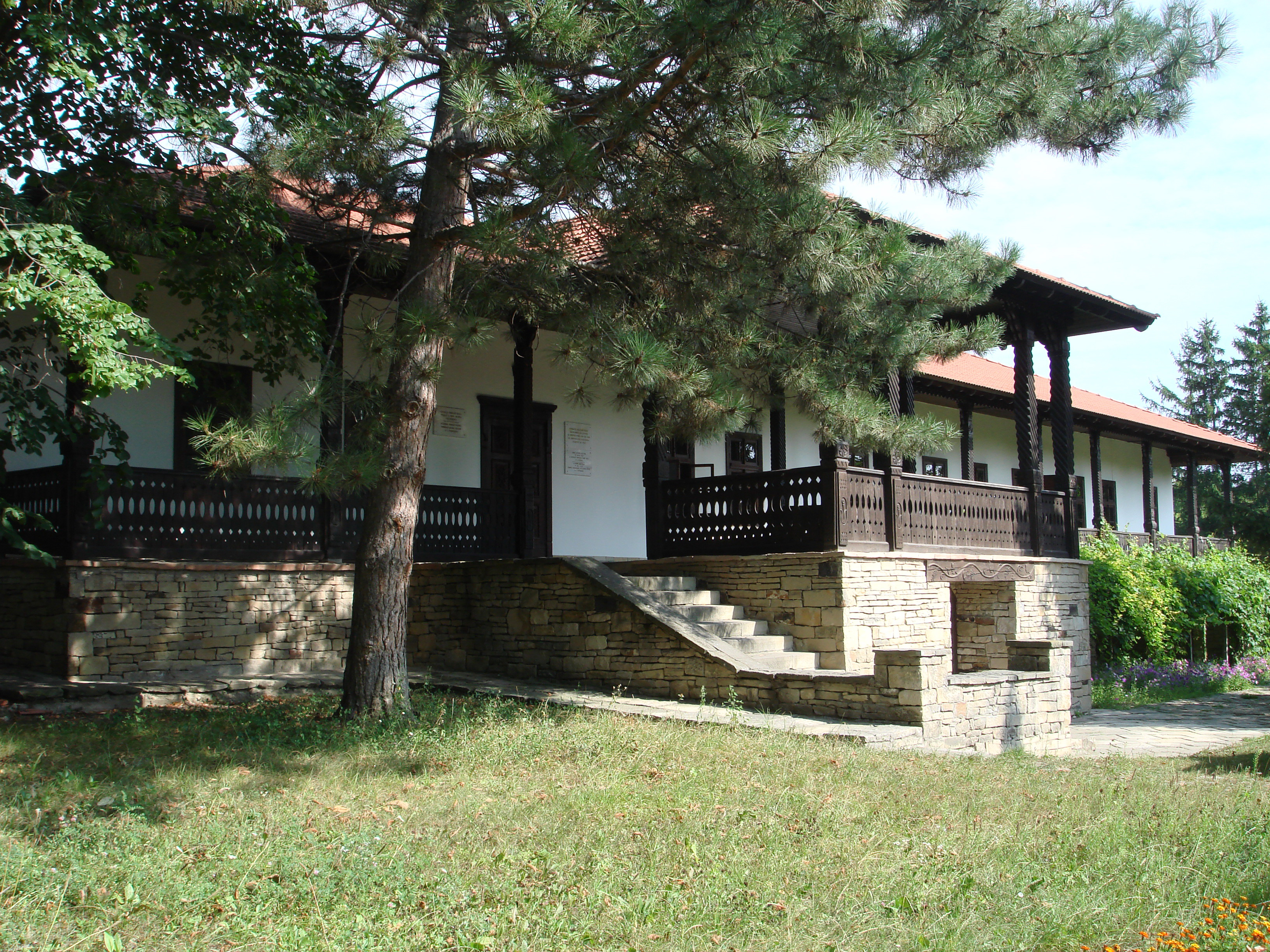
The Ralli manor and present-day museum in Dolna, Moldova

The subsequent genealogical claim traced the family history back to the late 15th century, with Hetman Luca Arbore. It also made Zamfir a distant relative of various members of Romanian socialist environment, including Vasile Morțun and Izabela Sadoveanu. The claim's reliability divides modern researchers. While historian of journalism Victor Frunză sees Arbore as descending "from an ancient family of local boyars", academic Lucian Boia describes Zamfir Arbore as being tied to the historical Arbores by "a rather thin line". Boia also notes that Arbore's "revised past" and arbitrary interpretation of his own background may have been opportunistic, leaving Arbore free to gravitate between conflicting national identities and rendering his radical discourse more palatable for all cultural contexts. According to political scientist Armand Goșu, Arbore had effectively "stolen" his grandmother's maiden name, reviving an otherwise extinct boyar line.

Although mostly active in Bessarabia, Arbore was actually a native of Chernowitz (Romanian: Cernăuți), the administrative center of Bukovina within the Austrian Empire (now Chernivtsi, Ukraine). He later moved into Bessarabia (the Russian-ruled Bessarabian Governorate), attending school in Kishinev (Chișinău), before moving to another school in Nikolayev. During his troubled youth, Arbore-Ralli underwent medical training in Moscow and Saint Petersburg, but was more involved within the revolutionary, nihilist and pan-Russian anarchist underground, with the goal of subverting Tsarist autocracy. His political sympathies also connected him with the Narodnik movement, which he joined at the same time as other young Bessarabian intellectuals (Victor Crăsescu, Axinte Frunză, Constantin Stere, Nicolae Zubcu-Codreanu) who saw a link between their nationalist struggle and the agrarian cause of Russian Narodniks (he is believed to have been personally acquainted with the agrarian theorist and Narodnik father figure Alexander Herzen).

=== In Switzerland ===
The subversive activities brought Zamfir to the attention of Tsarist authorities, particularly after his involvement in Sergey Nechayev's nihilist conspiracy of 1869. Unable to finish his studies, Arbore was singled out for arrest, and according to his own account, since placed under doubt, even served time as a political prisoner in the Peter and Paul Fortress and in Siberia. Eventually, he made his way to Switzerland, where he contacted international anarchist figures such as Mikhail Bakunin and Élisée Reclus. Arbore corresponded with the latter for a significant period, sharing his interest in social geography. His complex relationship with radical exiles also resulted in contacts with anarcho-communist theorist Peter Kropotkin and the Bulgarian anarchist sympathizer Hristo Botev. He was also, with philosopher Vasile Conta, one of the few intellectuals with a Romanian background to affiliate directly with the International Workingmen's Association (First International), which regrouped the various Marxist and anarchist communities of Europe. In tandem, Arbore was active within Bakunin's Revolutionary Brotherhood, and, according to anarchist historian George Woodcock, one of the "most influential" among the Russian propagators of Bakuninism; political historian James H. Billington also refers to "Zemfiry Ralli" as "Bakunin's principal editor".

Arbore's beliefs led him to join the Jura federation, an anarchist cell within the First International, and to become initiated into Freemasonry (1872). He became strongly opposed to Bakunin's marginalization during the First International's Hague Congress, and signed his name (Z. Ralli) to a letter of protest, alongside Nikolay Ogarev. Also in 1872, Arbore also helped draft the German-language pamphlet which documented Bakunin's condemnation of Nechayev: Ist Netshaejeff ein politischer Verbrecher oder nicht? ("Is Nechayev a Political Felon, or Is He Not?"). With Bakunin and Errico Malatesta, he was personally involved in the anarchist agitation sweeping Restoration Spain during the 1870s: he personally helped translate Bakunin's letter to the Iberian anarchists, but their hopes of inciting a new revolution were unsuccessful; progressively after that moment, Arbore and Bakunin grew estranged from one another. According to Woodcock, the reason behind this "personal" rather than ideological conflict was Bakunin's "tactless" support for Arbore's adversary Mikhail Sanzhin, leading Arbore and his partners, the "young Bakuninists", to establish the Revolutionary Community organization. The reasons and objectives of this group, whose other members were Vladimir Holstein, Alexander Oelsnitz and Nikolai Ivanovich Zhukovsky, were outlined in a letter to Jura anarchist James Guillaume.

Moving from Zurich to Geneva, and known primarily as Ralli, Arbore ran a socialist publishing house, through which he helped popularize the political manifestos of anarchism, as well as his own history of the Paris Commune. He was among those who established, in 1875, the Genevan Russian-language newspaper Rabotnik ("The Worker"), which bridged the "young Bakuninist" faction with the Eser Party of Vera Figner and Reclus' St. Imier International. One of his colleagues there, future astronomer Nikolai Alexandrovich Morozov, recalled that Arbore was actively involved in redacting news arriving from Russia, manipulating them for dramatic effect and political conformity. In 1875, he also wrote and published the anarchist tract Sytye i golodnye ("The Sated and the Hungry"), as well as an appeal to Ukrainian peasants in the Russian Empire.

The Swiss period was the start of his new family life. Arbore was by then married, to the Russian Ecaterina Hardina. The dowry she brought helped maintain his new publishing venture. His eldest child was daughter Ecaterina Arbore-Ralli, the future communist, feminist and militant physician, born on 11 November 1873, at Bex. His son Dumitru (Mitică) was born on 11 January 1877, in Geneva.

=== Relocation to Romania ===
Zamfir Arbore first set foot in Romania during 1873, when he traveled from Geneva to Iași, meeting with the young socialist sympathizer Eugen Lupu. He was later in contact with the Iași Marxist circle of Ioan, Iosif and Sofia Nădejde, sending them books by Karl Marx and his anarchist commentators (Johann Most, Carlo Cafiero). Arbore also established contacts with the socialist cell of Bucharest. He corresponded with some of the Russian socialists who had set up camp there, primarily so with Constantin Dobrogeanu-Gherea and Nicolae Zubcu-Codreanu. Together, they set up the Society for Student Culture and Solidarity, a semi-clandestine club located at the Concordia Hotel.

Again in Switzerland, he took part in the violent Red Flag Riot of Bern, organized in 1877 by the anarchist dissidence of the International—allegedly, his life was saved by fellow anarchist Jacques Gross. In 1878, Arbore was also the editor of the international tribune of the Revolutionary Community, Obshchina ("Community"), which was published as a successor of Rabotnik.

Reputedly threatened with an extradition back into the Russian Empire, Zamfir Arbore moved to Romania after the beginning of a Russo-Turkish War, during which the country, a Russian ally, obtained her independence from the Ottoman Empire. He later recalled that the inspiration for this move was young Romanian leftist Mircea Rosetti, whom he had first met during Reclus' visit to Vevey. Arbore's original goal was the spread of revolutionary propaganda among soldiers in the Imperial Russian Army, but, in short time, he settled down in Bucharest. It was there that Arbore fathered a second daughter, Lolica, who died without reaching maturity.

Arbore later set up, with fellow exiles Dobrogeanu-Gherea, Zubcu-Codreanu, Pavel Axelrod and Nikolai Sudzilovsky (Russel), an underground political movement agitating for the cause of Bessarabian Romanians; by means of this group, he is said to have gained access within the governing National Liberal Party, even earning discreet support from two of its leading figures, Ion Brătianu and C. A. Rosetti (father of Mircea Rosetti). Arbore would later speak of Brătianu as a discreet supporter of his projects to undermine Russian governments. Additionally, C. A. Rosetti is alleged to have personally assisted Arbore and Zubcu-Codreanu, who shared a Bucharest apartment, from evading both the persistent scrutiny of Romanian Police forces and the threat of extradition. In May 1877, Police forces quashed the Concordia hotel club, arresting various of its members. Arbore's connections were unsuccessful when it came to rescuing Dobrogeanu-Gherea, kidnapped and deported by the Russian Army in autumn 1877, although he eventually helped track down Gherea in Russia. Three years later, when Dobrogeanu-Gherea escaped back to Romania, Arbore helped him set up a restaurant in Ploiești station, from which Gherea supported his family.

Another National Liberal figure, the Bessarabian historian Bogdan Petriceicu Hasdeu, also cultivated a friendship with Arbore. According to Arbore's own recollections, although he and Hasdeu had been separated by "political-social views", they had been brought together by the recent deaths of Iulia Hasdeu and Lolica Arbore. Their shared loss, Arbore recalled, was leading them both to seek intellectual comfort in spiritualism or spiritism: Arbore, who was in correspondence with spiritists Camille Flammarion and William Crookes, recalled having joined a secretive spiritualist circle formed in Hasdeu's home, and being ridiculed in the Romanian press over this issue. Hasdeu was one of the noted guests in Arbore's own house.

=== 1880s politics ===
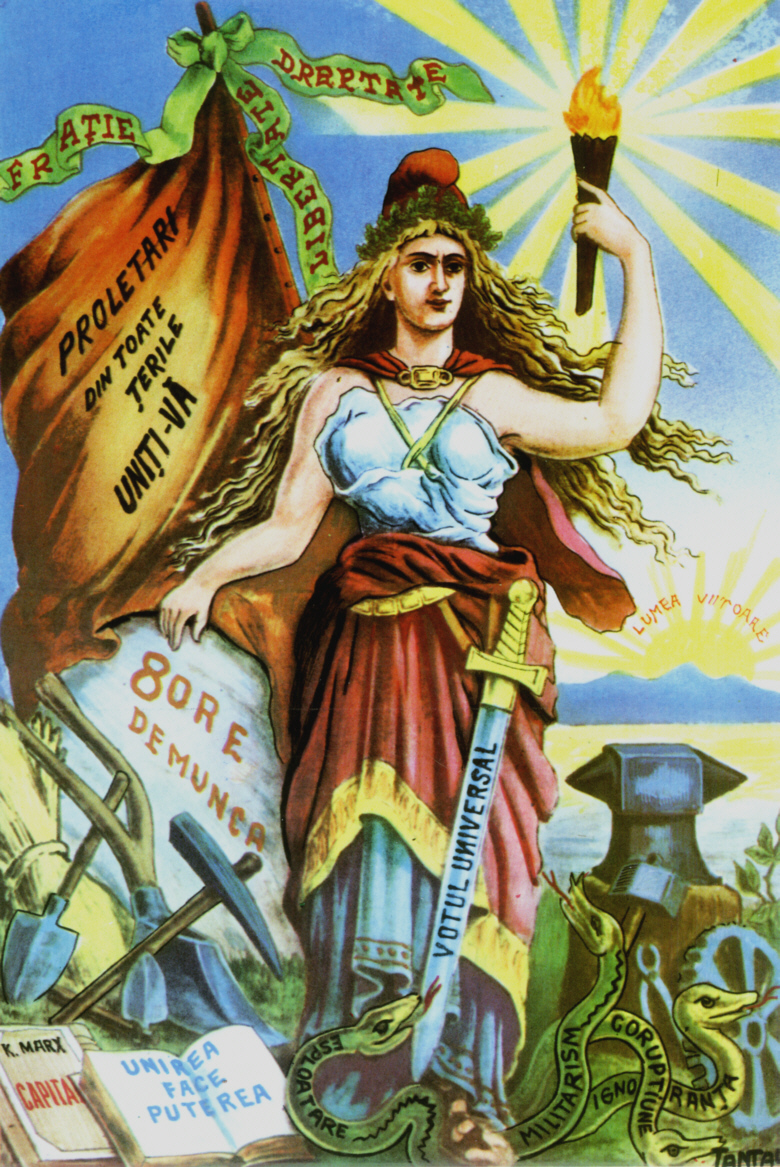
An allegorical illustration of Romanian socialist goals. Lumea Nouă, 1895

After the Trial of the Fourteen, the Revolutionary Community and all other Bakuninist groups were losing the battle in front of renewed Tsarist repression. Arbore, who now criticized Bakunian anarchism, quickly came to the conclusion that a socialist party was needed as a more radical alternative to the Romanian two-party system: in 1879, he helped organize the first-ever conference of Romanian socialist clubs, and, over the following months, was member of the editorial staff at România Viitoare, the socialist review (as a result of his participation, the magazine also enlisted contributions from Reclus and his brother Élie, as well as from poet Louis-Xavier de Ricard). The next year, he and the Nădejdes were briefly in contact with the senior political radical Titus Dunka, distributing for a while Dunka's gazette Înainte! ("Forward!").

In 1880, after a failed attempt on Ion Brătianu's life, the socialist circles faced government suspicion and became less organized, a situation which lasted until the election of 1888. At the time, Arbore was editor of Rosetti's democratic gazette Românul, and later moved to a similar position with the left-leaning newspaper Telegraful Român. Also at that stage, he befriended the Bukovinian Mihai Eminescu, later recognized as Romania's national poet, but at the time a secondary figure in the Bucharest press. Eminescu, who worked for the Conservative Party tribune Timpul, confided in Arbore about his pessimistic vision of Romanian society. At this stage, Arbore is believed to have helped other foreign-born socialists to find refuge in Romania: in particular to have assisted Peter (Petru) Alexandrov, the brother-in-law of writer Vladimir Korolenko, in obtaining a license to practice medicine in Tulcea and in defending himself during subsequent police inquiries. In 1881, he was himself naturalized a citizen of the newly proclaimed Kingdom of Romania.

By summer 1883, when Arbore too lost National Liberal support and was briefly expelled from Romania, Eminescu had become afflicted with mental illness (he eventually died in relative isolation, in 1889). Arbore was, around 1890, a correspondent for Frédéric Damé's Bucharest newspaper La Liberté Roumaine, with exposé pieces on the kidnapping of junior Bulgarian Navy officer Vladimir Kisimov by Russian spies. His third daughter Nina, later known as a visual artist, was born in January 1888. The elder, Ecaterina, was already taking her first steps in socialist politics, as a delegate to the International Congress of Students, held in Giurgiu.

Meanwhile, Zamfir Arbore was progressively integrated into the Romanian civil service: a clerk at the State Archives, he became a statistician in service to the Bucharest City Hall (from 1896 to 1920). As a socialist activist, he was coming to support the faction of Dobrogeanu-Gherea and Constantin Mille, who published Lumea Nouă review and ultimately set up the short-lived Romanian Social Democratic Workers' Party (PSDMR).

=== Amicul Copiilor and scientific work ===
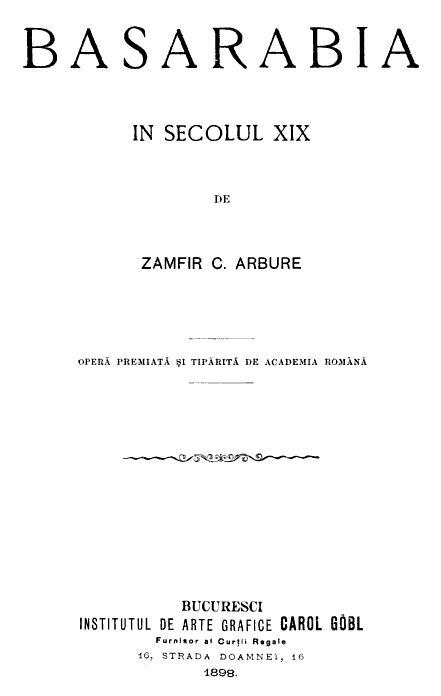
Title page of Basarabia în secolul XIX (1898)

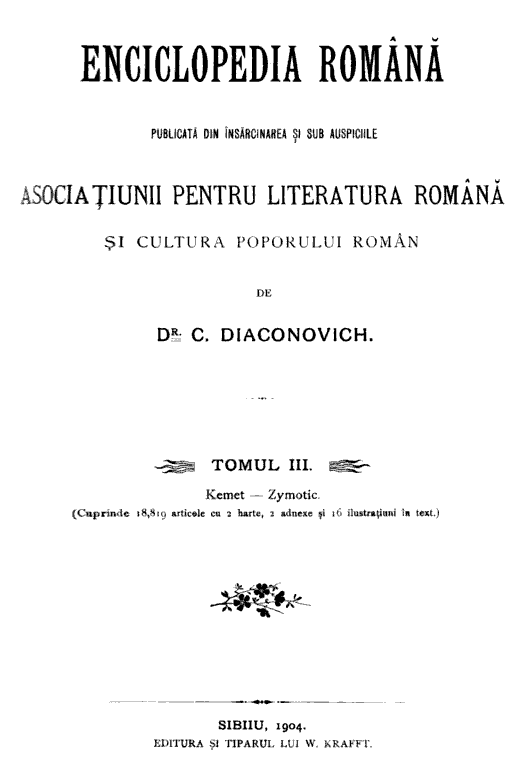
Title page of Cornelius Diaconovich, Enciclopedia română, final volume (1904)

From 1891 to 1898, he and Victor Crăsescu (who signed with the pen name Ștefan Basarabescu) were founders and managers of Amicul Copiilor ("The Children's Friend") magazine, which circulated classic works of children's literature and is sometimes rated as the first comic book magazine in Romanian history. Hasdeu, one of its main writers, is occasionally given credit as the person behind Amicul Copiilor. Arbore himself experimented with the genre, publishing children's versions of Don Quixote, Tartarin of Tarascon and Robinson Crusoe, as well as popular histories—one about Ancient Egypt, the other about 1821 rebel Tudor Vladimirescu. Hasdeu co-opted Arbore for the early 1899 project to create a professional association of writers as part of his Press Society (an actual Romanian Writers' Society was only created some 10 years later, after Hasdeu's death).

As statistician, Arbore was in charge of Bucharest's Buletinul Statistic ("Statistical Bulletin") and of the City Hall Library, which under his direction acquired several thousands of new books. With Ioan Nădejde, Arbore translated into Romanian the Russian Commercial Code. In parallel, he completed his main and lengthiest study in ethnography, Basarabia în secolul XIX ("Bessarabia in the 19th Century"), first published in 1898. It earned its author the annual Ion Heliade Rădulescu Prize of the Romanian Academy. Beginning 1903, he also taught Russian at the Bucharest War School. Arbore followed up on his scholarly work with the 1904 Dicționar geografic al Basarabiei ("A Geographical Dictionary of Bessarabia"). The same year, he was a voluntary contributor, with Bessarabian-themed entries, to the first-ever Romanian encyclopedic dictionary: Enciclopedia română, published in Austria-Hungary by Cornelius Diaconovich and ASTRA cultural society.

In 1906, during the National Exhibit held in celebration of the Romanian Kingdom (and one year before the large-scale peasants' revolt), Arbore joined a scientific committee which supervised an academic inquiry into the state of Romanian peasants, whose main author was militant sociologist G. D. Scraba.

=== 1905 Revolution ===
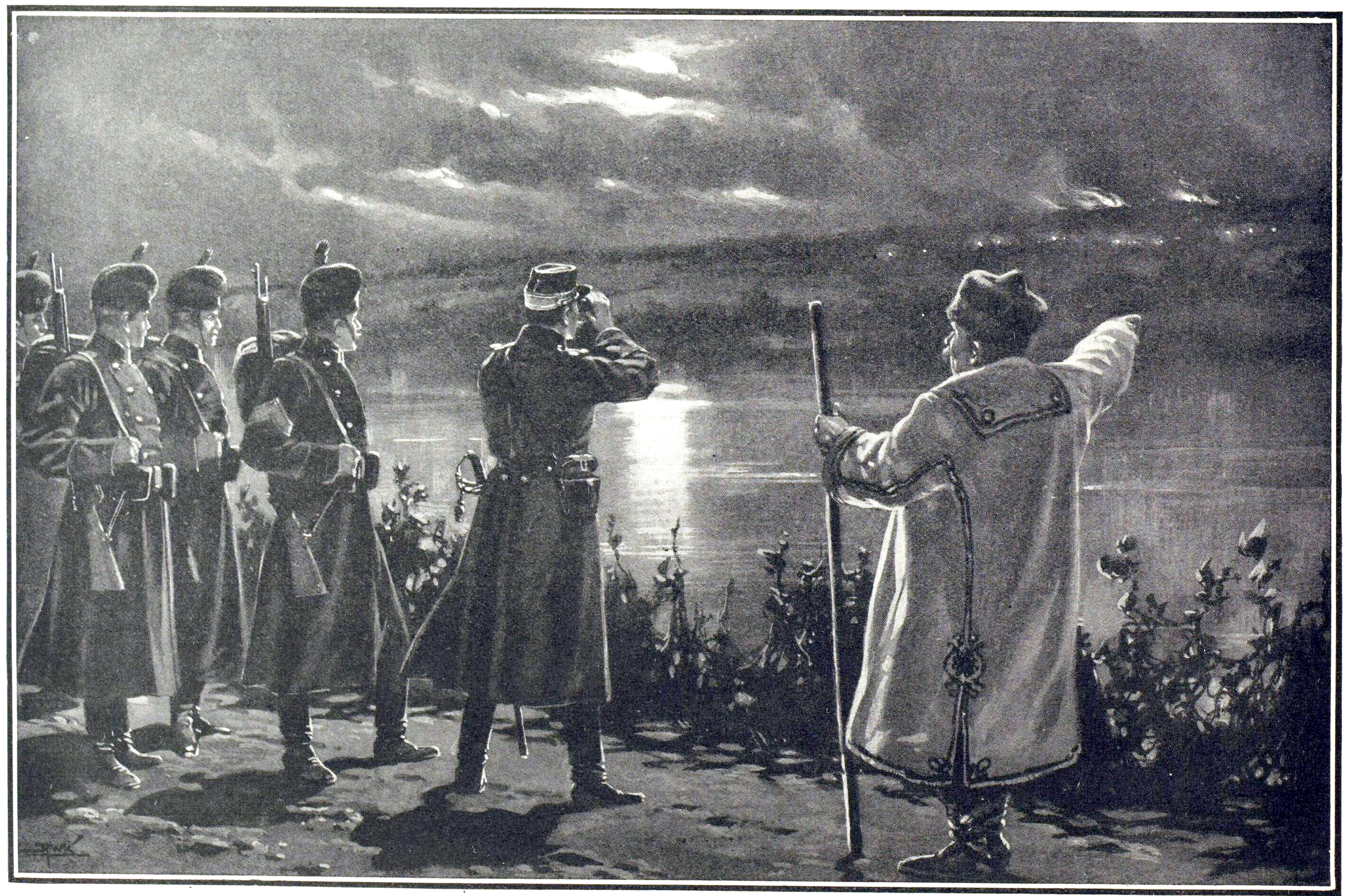
Romanian border troops survey the eastern Prut shore, where Bessarabian villages had caught on fire (The Illustrated London News, January 1906)

Before and during the Russian Revolution of 1905, Arbore was also involved in trafficking subversive works of literature over the Romanian–Russian border, hoping to encourage a rebellion among Bessarabian Romanian peasants and intellectuals. Theodor Inculeț, a theologian and political agitator, was one of his connections there. As Inculeț later wrote, the books "sent over by Arbure" were unequivocally "anti-Russian".

In 1904, Mikhail Nikolayevich von Giers, the Russian Ambassador to Romania, warned National Liberal Premier Dimitrie Sturdza that "Mr. Ralli-Arbore" intended to send into Russia many small packages of brochures, to be delivered by a special network of socialist agents. This exchange of notes degenerated into a major diplomatic incident when some of the contraband books were confiscated by Russian officials, and discovered to contain firearms. Arbore was singled out for extradition, but saved through the intercession of Take Ionescu, the Interior Minister, who even managed to have the weapons dispatched back to Romania. This was the beginning of an unusually close relationship with Romania's conservative environment and King Carol I (to whom he dedicated a volume of his memoirs). Reportedly as a favor to the Bessarabian activist, Carol was to allow safe passage into Romania to the wanted Russian Eser assassin Boris Savinkov. According to Arbore's own account, Carol, "the founder of modern Romania", privately resented Russia's national policy on Bessarabia.

Zamfir Arbore also welcomed into his house the Potemkin mutiny refugees—including socialist sailor Afanasi Matushenko, who became his close friend. He registered another personal triumph in 1905, when his aging friend Reclus also traveled to Romania. However, his main interest was by then outside the realm of socialist or anarchist politics. Together with Petru Cazacu, Arbore founded and edited a newspaper named Basarabia, printed in Switzerland but clandestinely circulated the Russian Empire during the Revolution. Basarabia went out of print after six consecutive issues, and, throughout its existence advertised itself as a Chișinău-based paper (although its editorial office was located in Geneva).

An immediate predecessor for the legal Basarabia of 1906, it was noted for its radical support of Bessarabian autonomy, demands for universal suffrage, and adoption of a modern Romanian alphabet instead of traditional Moldavian Cyrillic letters. In its final issue, Arbore and Cazan's gazette published the program of an incipient National Moldavian Party. After the Revolution toned down repression, Arbore could also collaborate with the Saint Petersburg-based socialist magazine Byloye, which published his biographical sketch of Sergey Nechayev. The text, signed Zemfir Ralli Arbore, notably includes detail on Nechayev's isolated political outlook, which, Arbore argued, was linked directly to 18th century Jacobin theorists and agitators (Maximilien de Robespierre, Philippe Buonarroti) rather than to later socialist schools.

=== Milcovul Society and PSDR connections ===
By 1908, Arbore had founded another venue for pro-Bessarabian political activism, the Milcovul Society (named after the Milcov River, a symbol of Romanian unity). The association was soon after infiltrated by the Russian spy Gheorghe V. Madan: exposed through a public scandal, Madan was expelled from Milcovul by Arbore's own vote. The controversy drew attention from Romania's secret service, Siguranța Statului, whose agents suspected, probably without just cause, that Arbore maintained contacts with Madan over the following period. In June 1909, Constantin Mille's daily, Adevărul, printed a draft of Arbore's memoirs, dealing with Eminescu's political views.

During the same years, Arbore played host to a new generation of Romanian socialist leaders and leaders of the local labor movement, who attempted to recreate a socialist party from the defunct PSDMR: Christian Rakovsky, Gheorghe Cristescu, I. C. Frimu and N. D. Cocea. Arbore did not join the Romanian Social Democratic Party (PSDR), created by Rakovsky in 1910, but was a special guest at its reunions. He was thus present at the PSDR's 1912 rally at Sala Dacia, where, in agreement with Rakovsky's political tenets, he spoke about the need to contain Russian imperialism; on the centenary of Bessarabia's occupation, he also addressed Romanian student organizations, informing them about the state of affairs in Russian dominions. Arbore was also claiming that some violent anarchists were in fact Russian agents: according to him, the suspected terrorist Ilie Cătărău was a secret affiliate of the loyalist Black Hundreds.

In September 1914, Arbore was honored by the PSDR's festive assembly honoring the 50th anniversary of the First International. In parallel, he gave external support to unionizing efforts, being notably an honored guest at the Romanian Journalists' Union festivities of May 1912, where he mainly spoke about Bessarabia. His first-born daughter, who had by then made her first contributions to social medicine, became directly involved with the PSDR and the România Muncitoare club, and, also in 1912, was elected to the PSDR Executive Committee. Dumitru, who was a chemical engineer in the thriving oil industry, and Nina, a debuting painter, were also both affiliated with PSDR at a grassroots level.

During that interval, the Bessarabian scholar was also becoming interested in cultivating a rapprochement between Romania and the Kingdom of Bulgaria, Romania's new neighbor to the south. This was reflected in his set of contributions to Slavistics and philology. His Romanian-Bulgarian dictionary, Българо-румънски речник, saw print in 1909. In 1912, Arbore translated and published for Minerva newspaper the 1886 manifesto "To the Romanian People", signed by Bulgarian revolutionary Zahari Stoyanov, in which Stoyanov spoke about his country's "moral duty" toward Romania and deplored the slow descent into ethnic rivalry.

=== World War I controversies ===
Arbore's activity as a publicist, activist and newspaperman flared up during the early stages of World War I, as Romania hesitated between joining the Entente Powers or honoring its loose commitment to the Central Powers, and in particular the German Empire. Like other Bessarabian exiles, Arbore objected to the first option, since it threw Romania into the same camp as the Russian Empire, opening the way for Russian domination in Romania, while leaving Bessarabia oppressed and Russified; he also identified the Ententist preoccupation with the Romanians of Transylvania and Bukovina as excessive, claiming that Austria-Hungary would inevitably transform itself into a democratic federation upon the end of war. These ideas made their way into his wartime articles for Seara newspaper and his standalone political essays: the 1914 Autonomia sau anexarea. Transilvania și Bucovina ("Autonomy or Annexation. Transylvania and Bukovina"), the 1915 Liberarea Basarabiei ("The Liberation of Bessarabia") and the 1916 Ukraina și România ("Ukraine and Romania").

Of these, Liberarea Basarabiei was printed with support from an eponymous political society, the League for the Liberation of Bessarabia. Arbore's stance was compatible with the PSDR's Zimmerwald neutralism: by 1915, Ecaterina Arbore was also noted for her political statements against a Russian alliance. Internationally, her father collaborated with Annales des Nationalités, the anti-imperialist periodical put out by Jean Pélissier and Juozas Gabrys. Suspicion arose that Arbore was also in the pay of German intelligence, receiving at least 28,000 lei through such channels.

In summer 1916, Romania disappointed Arbore by rallying with the Entente. After a short-lived offensive into Transylvania, the Romanian Land Forces were defeated, and the Central Powers invaded southern Romania. Arbore stayed behind in German-occupied Bucharest while the legitimate government withdrew to Iași, and maintained a generally friendly but discreet attitude toward the occupiers. He was less active as a journalist and militant, but contributed to the Germanophile daily Lumina, put out by the Bessarabian activist Constantin Stere, and once lectured on the Bessarabian question during April 1918. Arbore also kept a low profile during the 1918 truce, when, with German acquiescence, Romania united with Bessarabia. Reputedly, Stere, who negotiated the union with the Bessarabian Assembly, mistrusted and sidelined Arbore during the events.

In his own account of the wartime years, Arbore claimed to have been arrested on several occasions by the occupation authorities, but this claim, Boia notes, remains unverified and doubtful. Arbore was returning to a socialist discourse, probably rekindled and reshaped by news of the October Revolution in Russia. During the period, he took a personal interest in the fate of Russian prisoners held on occupied territory, and, in a letter to the Germanophile academic Ioan Bianu, spoke about the need to popularize revolutionary ideas among this particular group.

=== Senator and political suspect ===
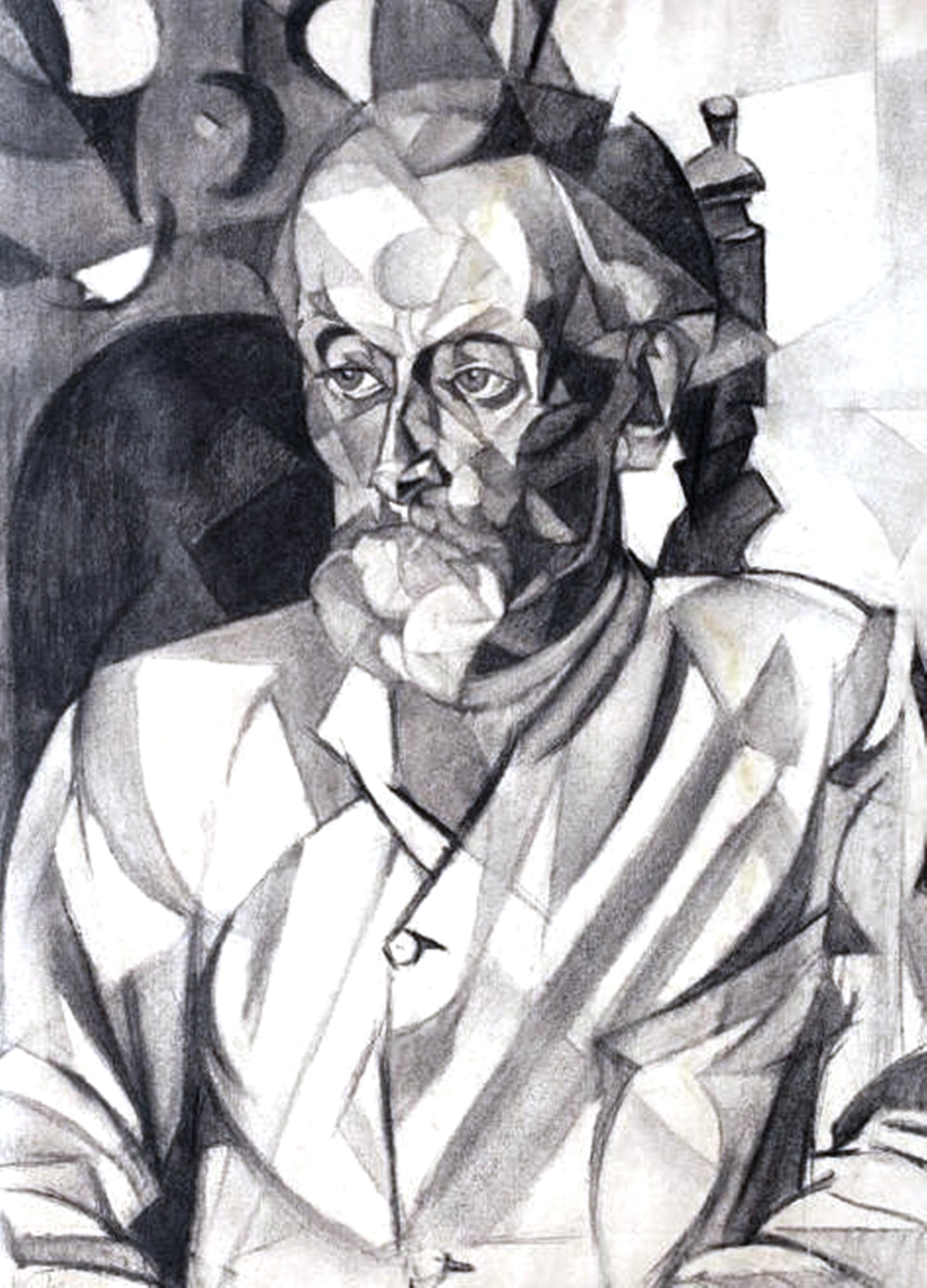
Arbore in the 1920s, as drawn by Nadia Bulighin

After the unexpected German defeat of November 1918 brought a moral victory for Romanian Ententists and the return of Ententist forces in government, Arbore withstood scrutiny as an alleged collaborator with the enemy. In this context, he rallied with a new radical force, the Peasants' Party, and ran for political office in what was by then Greater Romania. During the November 1919 election, he presented himself as a Senate candidate for Chișinău, Bessarabia, and was elected. His new political credo was outlined in his Senate speech of 27 December 1918, which focused on proposals to change the 1866 constitutional regime and amend the prewar tradition of centralized government, while also outlining his main defense against suspicions of collaborationism. His daughter Ecaterina was rendered a suspect by her Socialist Party of Romania militancy. She further antagonized the public when, as a Communist Party of Romania founder, she supported the self-determination of Bessarabia and its separation from Romania, in line with Comintern policies. After being arrested several times, she made her may into the Soviet state. Dumitru Arbore also joined the Communist Party, was kept under surveillance by the authorities for hosting conspirative sessions at his home in Prahova County, but remained in Romania, where he died in an October 1921 accident.

Arbore lost his Senate seat when Parliament was dissolved by King Ferdinand I; he soon after left the Peasants' Party, pushed into opposition, and was reelected to the Senate as a People's Party candidate in the summer 1920 election. Late in 1920, he was co-founder and secretary of the Socialist Peasants' Party, together with playwright Ion Peretz, publicist Ioan Pangal, abbot Iuliu Scriban etc.

Withdrawn from national politics, Arbore again focused on his journalist's activity and was at the forefront of Romanian Freemasonry. His membership in the local subsidiary of the Grand Orient de France was confirmed in December 1922 by Mihail Noradunghian, and he was recognized as a Rank 33 Mason, Worshipful Master of Human Rights Lodge (located in Bucharest). On 23 April 1923, Arbore was elected Grand Master of a major Romanian Scottish Rite branch, the Grand Lodge (Grand Master for life after 1930), and was the Grand Orator for Romania within the Supreme Scottish Rite Council from 1929. These promotions were scrutinized by the anti-Masonic far right: in a public conference, Nicolae Paulescu of the National-Christian Defense League called Arbore the Grand Master of a "Kike-Romanian Masonic group".

His own far left inclinations were by then contrasting with his civil service positions, which he maintained even as his daughter Ecaterina was becoming a persona non grata. In 1923, Arbore published a new installment of his memoirs, as În temnițele rusești ("In the Russian Dungeons"). In March 1924, he replaced Vasile Ghenzul as editorial director of Furnica ("The Ant"). The cooperativist and agrarian bimonthly was published in Bessarabia, and printed a Russian-language supplement. He was still a contributor to the central leftist press: in December 1926, Adevărul published his piece about the Serbian politician Nikola Pašić, defunct leader of the People's Radical Party. During this interval, Ecaterina tried to return to Romania. According to the opinion of journalist Victor Frunză, she was trying to hide her growing disillusionment with communism under the pretext that she needed to take care of her ailing father. The Romanian authorities did not allow her entry into the country, and she was forced back. Zamfir and his wife had earlier adopted Dumitru's young child, Zamfir Dumitru Arbore.

=== Final years ===
In 1930, the recently widowed Zamfir Arbore was pensioned from his teaching position at the Bucharest War School, where he had also been lecturing in Geography and Topography. During the final years of his life, Arbore was a sporadic contributor to Pan Halippa's review Viața Basarabiei. In tandem, his revolutionary past, in particular his early dealings with Hristo Botev, were also the subject of interviews with journalist Vasile Christu. His own output as a researcher included an undated monograph on his friend and ally Zubcu-Codreanu, who had died in 1878 (O pagină din istoria socialismului român, "A Page in the History of Romanian Socialism"), as well as the collected memoirs: Temniță și exil ("Prison and Exile") and În exil. Amintirile mele ("In Exile. My Memories").

Zamfir Arbore died in Bucharest, on 2 or 3 April 1933. He was buried at Sfânta Vineri Cemetery, alongside Ecaterina, Dumitru, and Lolica Arbore. Paradoxically, his funeral ceremony comprised both the military honors owed to his position in the War School and revolutionary orations given in tribute by his socialist comrades. The socialist tribune Societatea de Mâine published an obituary, which referred to Arbore as "one of the highest profile representative figures [in socialism], and one of the most worthy examples for all people-loving generations to follow."

== Political and scientific theories ==
=== Arbore's political program ===
Despite official promotion, Zamfir Arbore had serious trouble integrating his views within the political landscape of 20th century Romania. Critic and political historian Ioan Stanomir writes that Arbore, "the agent who precipitates revolution", was "an aristocrat animated by dramatic self-loathing". His Narodnik ideals subsided with time: according to literary historian Leonid Cemortan, Arbore was "totally defeated" in his Narodnik activity, realized that it was an "unattainable dream", but was nonetheless unable to "verify and correct" his vision. Arbore, who never registered his membership with any Romanian socialist party or faction, was reportedly perplexed by the antisemitism prevalent in his adoptive country, including among the Romanian socialists and trade unionists.

His transition from anarchism to a more moderate platform was also shown by his treatment of the Bessarabian issue. In 1905, his Basarabia newspaper tied together demands of social reform with political and cultural goals, endorsing the planned land reform and demanding the official use of Romanian ("Moldavian") in the administrative apparatus and the Bessarabian Orthodox Church. Its demand for self-governance around an enlarged Sfat ("Assembly") referred back to promises made upon the creation of a Bessarabian Governorate. The entire program, scholar Marcel Mitrașcă notes, was one of the first manifestations of "Bessarabian [Romanian] nationalism", the prototype for an agenda later espoused by the National Moldavian Party. Political analysts Mihai Cernencu and Igor Boțan suggest that the political doctrine supported by Basarabia was at once an early instance of Bessarabian liberalism and a regional affiliation to the Constitutional Democratic Party, somewhat permeated by the doctrines of social democracy. More intimately, Arbore was contemplating the possibility of an independent Bessarabia, free from what he considered to be the excesses of Romanian nationalism.

By the end of his life, he was publicizing his disappointment with the political environment of Greater Romania and explaining his return to socialism. In a Viața Basarabiei article, he claimed: "Wherever I look around me I see only decay. The old and the young, the cultivated and the illiterate, all behave equally, not even asking themselves what the meaning of their life is in the general progress of humanity. Living inside Romanian society I for one was not able to merge into it. [...] I haven't had and I still don't have friends in Romania." His attitude, including claims that Bessarabia was being colonized by rapacious Romanians from other provinces, outraged the nationalist newspaperman Alexandru "Ion Gorun" Hodoș, who wrote that Arbore was no longer sincerely interested in national unity, but rather displayed "the need to detect, under any Romanian uniform, an assassin of Bessarabia's population."

Arbore's main research on Bessarabian history and local geography fused scientific and political objectives. Allegedly inspired by the similar interests of Élisée Reclus, Dicționar geografic al Basarabiei was the first-ever actual Bessarabian gazetteer. In his two works on Bessarabia, Arbore sought to present a detailed account of economic and social geography. He notably inventoried the villages originally settled by free peasants (răzeși), accounting for 151 such localities in central Bessarabia and 4 in the Budjak.

Overall, the politicized aspect of his contribution also had negative connotations. According to literary critic Bogdan Crețu (who builds on the conclusions of literary historian Leonte Ivanov), Arbore was also responsible for circulating a stereotyped image of the Russian Empire and its inhabitants. Before 1914, Arbore made accusatory claims about Russification and the Russian Orthodox Church expansion into Bessarabia: depicting the Russian Synod as a heretical, non-Orthodox, institution, he argued that church officials were burning Romanian books for heating.

=== Germanophilia and Russophobia ===
Arbore's wartime stance, in particular his conjectural support for the Central Powers, was likened by Lucian Boia to that of fellow Bessarabian Constantin Stere, with the exception that Arbore was more the political radical, opposed to Tsarist autocracy, than a nationalist or Russophobe. However, as early as 1912, Arbore was envisaging a general rising against Russia, also involving the Poles and the Finns. In Autonomia sau anexarea, he claimed that "damned Russia" secretly wanted to lure Romania into her war with the Austro-Hungarian provinces inhabited by Romanians, and in exchange expand its own territory southwards, into the Danube Delta and Dobruja. Arbore therefore saw the Transylvanian union as a hopeless project; his consolation for Romanians, Transylvanian as well as Bukovinian, was in the federalization of Austria-Hungary. Later, he claimed that his beliefs on the Transylvanian issue were quite similar to the skeptical Habsburg loyalism of Transylvanian politicos, from Eugen Brote and Ioan Slavici to Aurel Popovici.

The articles he contributed to Seara noted with surprise that the pro-Entente Francophiles were more interested in rescuing France than they were in the fate of Bessarabian Romanians. Liberarea Basarabiei, Marcel Mitrașcă argues, was one of the select few manifestations of Romanian national sentiment to advocate Bessarabian emancipation at the peak of wartime agitation, alongside similar manifestos by Stere, Axinte Frunză, Dumitru C. Moruzi etc. Arbore's political theory was later expanded into a Germanophile manifesto: Arbore claimed that Romania's only option was to rally with "Russia's enemies" on the Eastern Front, limiting European Russia to the "ethnographic" borders of ancient Muscovy; the alternative, he warned, was that the muscălime ("Moskals") would in the long run annex Romania and all her irredenta. Again, he described the Romanian prospects of "liberating Bessarabia" as intrinsically linked with the German-sponsored emancipation of Congress Poland, the Grand Duchy of Finland and Ukraine. In an August 1915 piece for Seara, Arbore saluted the German people as the more "enlightened" combatant, who had accumulated a "colossal vital energy" and was therefore poised to emerge as the victor.

With Ukraina și România, Zamfir Arbore spoke out against the opinions expressed by Romanian nationalist historian Nicolae Iorga, a leading figure in pro-Entente politics, who had denied the existence of a distinct Ukrainian identity. In fact, Arbore argued, the cultural separation between Ukrainians and Russians was both justified by history and opportune for the Romanian cause: since the Russian Empire could not hope to become a federation, and an independent Ukraine was therefore inevitable, "the Ukrainian state would be a peaceful neighbor to Greater Romania."

According to Lucian Boia, Arbore's public stances under the actual German occupation were surprisingly toned down. His one article for Lumina (November 1917) reviewed the Russian issue in quite different terms, prophesying that a multinational federation could be effected around the Russian Provisional Government. His 1918 public lectures on Bessarabia were focused on geographic and statistical information—"one would have expected more", Boia notes. Arbore was more outspoken during the interwar period: his December 1918 speech demanded the guarantee of minority rights in Greater Romania, saluted the policies of Soviet Russia as a liberating force, and predicted a Bolshevik victory in the Russian Civil War. On the occasion, Arbore also demanded the release of Socialist Party activists held in Romanian custody, as well as the freeing of Transylvanian collaborationist Slavici.

== Legacy ==
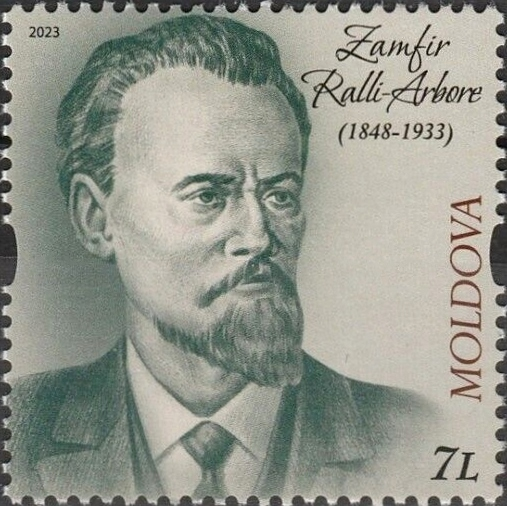
Arbure on a 2023 stamp of Moldova

=== Impact in academia ===
As both a historical figure and a historian, Zamfir Arbore received mixed reviews from other academics. His Viața Basarabiei partner Pan Halippa noted that Arbore's historical but minor merit in opposing "Russification" was equivalent to that of other Bessarabian boyars and writers from various epochs: Stere, Alecu Donici, Alexandru Hâjdeu, Bogdan Petriceicu Hasdeu and Constantin Stamati. Although an ideological adversary of Arbore, Nicolae Iorga similarly referred to his Bessarabian colleague as a pioneer of Romanian Bessarabian activism. Sociologist Henri H. Stahl focused instead on Arbore's contributions as a scientist. Stahl discusses him and Stere, alongside theorist Constantin Dobrogeanu-Gherea and Nicolae Zubcu-Codreanu, as one of the most important intellectuals in the group of ex-Narodniks who contributed to the left-wing school of social sciences in Romania. He notes that Arbore stood apart in this group for his anarchist ideals, uncommon in his adoptive Romania. Contrarily, historian Cyril E. Black assessed that, unlike Stere's post-Narodnik theory of Poporanism, Arbore's influence in Romanian politics was "negligible". A more controversial aspect of Arbore's legacy is an enduring accusation of plagiarism: his works are alleged to have borrowed the research of various other authors, to whom Arbore did not give proper credit.

As early as 1879, Dobrogeanu-Gherea circulated some of Arbore's reminiscences of revolutionary life, quoted as excerpts in his own essays. One of the earliest historiographic works to trace Arbore's lifelong socialist militancy was authored shortly before its subject died, in 1933. Authored by I. C. Atanasiu, it was titled Mișcarea socialistă ("The Socialist Movement"). The same year, an account of his activities in Geneva was published as part of Pavel Axelrod's book of memoirs. A monograph on Arbore's life and work was published in 1936 by social scientist Alexandru Siedel.

=== The Arbores and communist censorship ===
From her adoptive Soviet Union, Arbore's older daughter Ecaterina cultivated her father's image: in 1931, she helped publish fragments of his memoirs on Mikhail Bakunin and Sergey Nechayev, translated into Russian and signed with the abridged name Z. K. Ralli. Noted for her medical work and political standing, Ecaterina was nevertheless labeled an enemy of the Soviet people, arrested and killed during the Great Purge of the late 1930s. As an author, Zamfir Arbore was somewhat tolerated in the Soviet Union and its Moldavian SSR, created in 1940 by the Soviet occupation of Bessarabia. In the late 1940s, his name was included on a long list of authors officially banned by the Soviet censorship apparatus. However, in later years he was officially quoted and praised, one of the few exceptions to the rule which put limits on the popularization of Romanian literature (unlike Stere, whose work were still banned).

In Romania, Arbore was survived by daughter Nina (d. 1942). Known as the Romanian student of Henri Matisse, she maintained an interest in moderate leftist causes, joining the group formed around Cuvântul Liber newspaper. Her nephew Zamfir Dumitru Arbore fought against Nazi Germany in World War II, receiving Steaua României.

In postwar Communist Romania, Zamfir Dumitru Arbore worked as a state planner, and established a family: his successors were still living at the family home in Bucharest in the early 1970s. The Arbores' patriarch was being rediscovered as a scholar, in particular after the 1960s liberalization (when Ecaterina was posthumously rehabilitated). Communist censorship however intervened in his various republished texts, cutting out all remarks which could seem Russophobic, keeping his political writings hidden from public view while allowing some exposure to his geography tracts. Among the anti-communist Romanian diaspora, genealogist Mihai Dim. Sturdza completed a more thorough account of Arbore's career, which covered the controversial aspects and was published in Sturdza's dictionary Familiile boierești din Moldova și Țara Românească ("Boyar Families of Wallachia and Moldavia"). Armand Goșu noted that the entry comprised "the best pages ever written on Zamfir Arbore", while Ioan Stanomir sees in it a real-life equivalent of Fyodor Dostoevsky's The Possessed and Joseph Conrad's Under Western Eyes. During the 1960s, the exiled journalist Pamfil Șeicaru also included ample references to Arbore's anti-Russian texts in his own anti-communist propaganda works. After the Romanian Revolution of 1989, Arbore's name resurfaced in a nationalist conspiracy theory, which claims that Mihai Eminescu's descent into mental illness was staged by his more conservative political rivals. According to this interpretation, the involuntary commitment of Eminescu in summer 1883 was set to coincide with the expulsion of his friend Arbore.

=== In Moldova and abroad ===
Arbore's works were reprinted in Moldova, the independent post-Soviet republic comprising the bulk of historical Bessarabia. Moldovan literary historians Ion Varta and Tatiana Varta oversaw the 2001 reprint of Basarabia în secolul XIX; the same year, Editura Fundației Culturale Române and Editura Museum co-edited his Dicționar geografic al Basarabiei, with Iurie Colesnic as caretaker. His name was assigned to streets in both Chișinău and Bucharest. His Dolna manor is preserved as a museum.

Arbore's contribution also made an impact outside its immediate cultural context. His memoirs were reviewed early on by anarchist historian Max Nettlau, who called them inaccurate, without specifying to what extent. Later, the various writings of Arbore-Ralli were studied, translated and preserved by exile Marxists Boris Nicolaevsky and Egor E. Lazarev, and passed on to the Hoover Institution. Writing in 1994, American historian Keith Hitchins reviewed Basarabia în secolul XIX as "an old, in some ways classic" and "still useful" Romanian study of the Bessarabian question. Arbore's 2009 biography at the anarchist Kate Sharpley Library focuses on his revolutionary career rather than his other commitments, claiming that the Romanian reviews of his nationalist policies, beginning with Nicolae Iorga's texts, are "mystification", and noting that his activities in Greater Romania "remain to be investigated". According to the same source, an English translation of Temniță și exil was in progress, and considered for publication with Canada's Black Cat Press.
