= Scorțeni, Telenești =

Village in Telenești, Moldova

Scorțeni
- Village
- Location within Moldova
- Coordinates: 47°38′N 28°38′E
- Country: Moldova
- District: Telenești District
- Elevation: 100 m (330 ft)

Population (2014 census)
  - Total: 2,149
- Time zone: UTC+2 (EET)
  - Summer (DST): UTC+3 (EEST)
- Postal code: MD-5831

Scorțeni is a village in Telenești District, Moldova.

== Natives ==
- Axinte Frunză (1859–1933), political activist, writer, and teacher of Latin
