= Ecaterina Arbore =

Romanian, Soviet, and Moldovan communist activist and official (1873–1937)

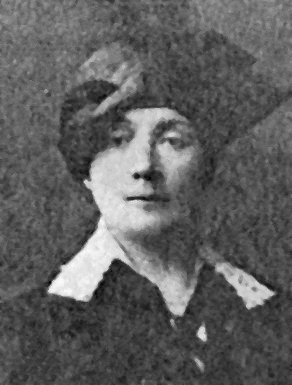

People's Commissar for Health of the Moldavian ASSR
- In office 1924–1929

Personal details
- Born: November 11, 1873 Geneva, Switzerland
- Died: December 2, 1937 (aged 64) Tiraspol, Moldavian ASSR, Ukrainian SSR, USSR (present-day Moldova)
- Party: Communist Party of Romania; All-Union Communist Party
- Other political affiliations: Moldavia Regional Committee of the Communist Party of Ukraine
- Parent: Zamfir Ralli-Arbore (father)
- Education: Faculty of Medicine, Bucharest; Pasteur Institute; University of Saint Petersburg
- Profession: physician, humanist, publicist, revolutionary, feminist, politician
- Employer: Communist University of the National Minorities of the West

Academic work
- Main interests: public health, medical sociology

Ekaterina Arbore, Arbore-Ralli or Ralli-Arbore (rendered into Russian as Екатерина Арборе or Арборэ - Yekaterina Arborye or Arbore, with "Ralli" as Ралли; 1873 or 1875 – 2 December 1937), daughter of Zamfir Arbore (a socialist militant in Imperial Russia), was a Romanian, Soviet, and Moldovan communist activist and official, as well as a socialist feminist.

== Early life ==
Born in Geneva, she trained towards a medical degree, and became committed to socialism and the Social Democratic Party during her University years. As such, Ecaterina Arbore took part in the proceedings of the 2nd Congress of the Second International in 1903, and she served as member of the executive committee of the Socialist Party.

She campaigned for an efficient preventive medicine, especially as an answer to the rising incidence of tuberculosis within large groups of the industrial worker population (as stated in her 1907 medical sociology work, Influența industriilor asupra sănătății lucrătorilor). At the same time, she demanded increased social security, and tried herself to improve conditions, mainly by creating the very first crèches in Romania.

== In the Soviet Union ==
After the October Revolution, she became an enthusiastic supporter of the Bolshevik cause, opting to leave Romania for Bolshevist Russia in 1918. Once there, after being received in the ranks of the Russian Communist Party, Ecaterina Arbore was integrated in the administrative structure of the Ukrainian SSR, as Commissar for Health.

She returned to Romania briefly, in 1924, being swiftly expelled by the authorities. Back in the Soviet state, Arbore was a delegate of the Romanian Socialist-Communist Party (Romanian Communist Party) to the 5th Congress of the Comintern, and took part in the Party's 5th Congress in Moscow and Kharkiv (1931). She became Health Commisar for the newly created Moldavian ASSR, being one of the Romanian/Moldovan intellectuals who endorsed the terms of the Soviet policy towards the Romanian state.

== Persecution and murder ==
As a rather old member of the movement, she was a natural target for Joseph Stalin's repression. Viewed as a partisan of Trotskyism, she was marginalized and stripped of all political decision. This is the time when she was paid a visit by Romanian author Panait Istrati, during the latter's revelatory journey to the Soviet lands (as described in his The Confession of a Loser). Istrati praised the work carried by Arbore in the Health Department of the Republic, and likened her the legendary architect Meșterul Manole's wife, who according to myth, was walled in the monastery by her husband, who believed this to be the only thing able to prevent the building from collapsing; this is a reflection on the terror that was mounting in the Soviet Union, as a direct consequence of the state not being able to live up to its promise.

She was arrested during the Great Purge, and died in 1937 (it is not known whether this meant she was executed straight away, or whether her death was preceded by a stay in the Gulag). She was rehabilitated by Soviet authorities during the De-Stalinization process, and by Romanian ones a while after the rise of Nicolae Ceaușescu, during the condemnation of Soviet policies in 1968 (she was exonerated together with most Romanian communist victims of Stalin's purges).
