= Chișinău Theological Seminary =

Coordinates: 47.02350287°N 28.82878249°E

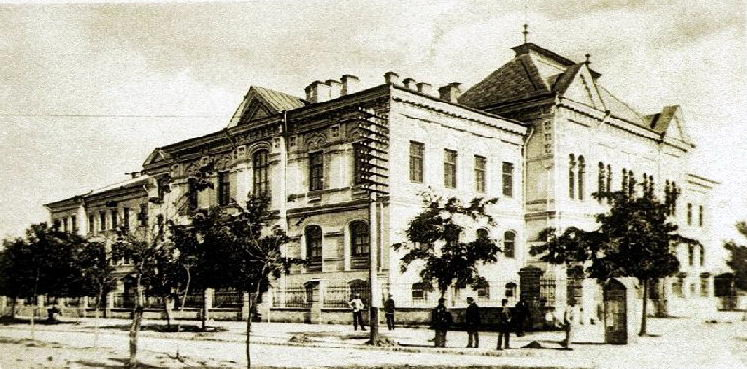
Chișinău Theological Seminary, c.1900

Chișinău Theological Seminary is a seminary in Chișinău. Gavril Bănulescu-Bodoni opened the Romanian-language seminary on January 31, 1813.

== History ==
On 1 September 1918, Visarion Puiu became principal of the Chișinău Theological Seminary, being named Exarch of Bessarabia's monasteries two months later (soon after that province united with the Kingdom of Romania).
