= Nikolai Sudzilovsky =

Belarusian revolutionary and scientist (1850–1930)

- Николай Судзиловский
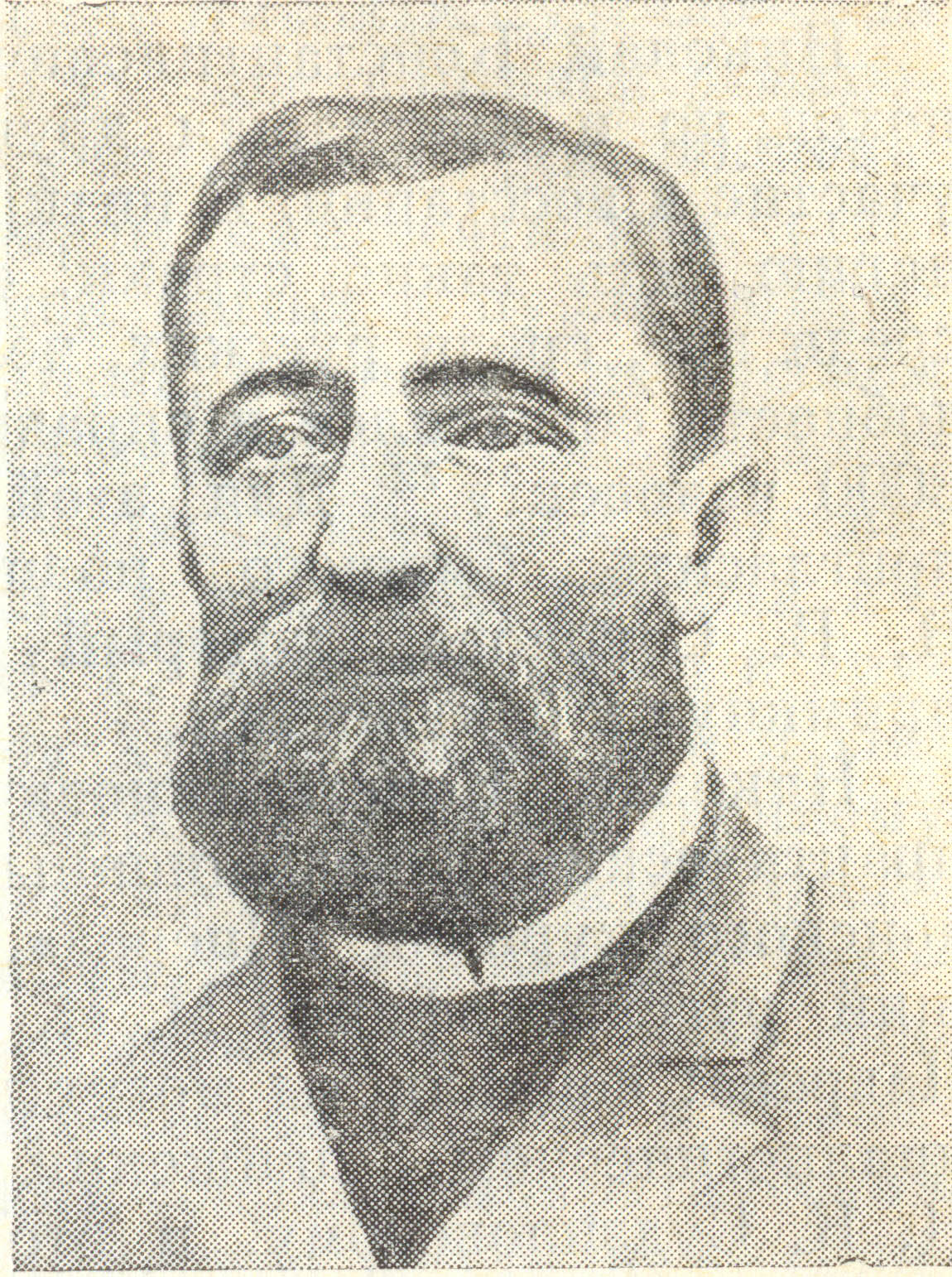

1st President of the Hawaii Senate
- In office 1901–1902
- Succeeded by: Samuel E. Kaiue

Personal details
- Born: December 15, 1850 Mogilev, Russian Empire (present-day Belarus)
- Died: April 30, 1930 Tianjin, China
- Citizenship: Russian Empire (1850–87); United States (1887–1905); Stateless (1905–21); Soviet Union (1921–30)
- Party: Home Rule Party of Hawaii
- Profession: doctor

Nikolai Konstantinovich Sudzilovsky (Note: Russian: Николай Константинович Судзиловский, romanized: Nikolay Konstantinovich Sudzilovsky; Belarusian: Мікалай Канстанцінавіч Судзілоўскі, romanized: Mikalay Kanstantsinavich Sudzilowski) (December 15, 1850 – April 30, 1930, also known as Nicholas Russel and Kauka Lukini) was a revolutionary and scientist. He was from the Russian Empire and later emigrated to the United States.

== Biography ==
Sudzilovsky was born in Mogilev to a noble family. He entered the St. Petersburg University law department but dropped out on the next year and entered medical department of the Kiev University where he did not finish his studies. He began to get involved in political activity being one of the organisers of the Kiev commune, a left-wing student organisation in 1873–1874. Getting a job of medical assistant at the Nikolayev prison, he tried to arrange mass escape of the prisoners, but his plot failed and he had to flee from Russia escaping arrest in 1875.

In 1876 under the pseudonym Nicholas Russel, Sudzilovsky took part in the Bulgarian April Uprising against the Ottoman Empire. In 1877 he graduated from medical faculty of the University of Bucharest. Russel was one of the organisers of the socialist movement in Romania, published a socialist paper, and carried out socialist propaganda among the Russian troops during the Russo-Turkish War. He also fought in Romania's war of independence, being distinguished with the Order of the Star of Romania.

Dr. Russel was one of the most energetic socialists during his stay in Romania from 1875 until 1881 when he was deported, at the request of the Tsarist authorities, after attempting to hold a celebration of "The 10th Anniversary of the Paris Commune of 1871".

In 1887, Sudzilovsky moved to San Francisco and later Hawaii, becoming an American citizen. There he became a founder of the Home Rule Party of Hawaii in 1892, which opposed Hawaii's joining the United States. In 1900 under the name Kauka Lukini, Sudzilovsky was elected Hawaii Senator, in 1901 was elected as 1st Hawaii Senate President.

During the Russo-Japanese War of 1904–1905 Sudzilovsky actively conducted socialist propaganda among Russian prisoners of war. Following the demands of Russia's foreign minister, the US government revoked his citizenship. Sudzilovsky spent the last years of his life in the Philippines and China.

He was author of several works on medicine and sociology and was a member of the American Genetics Society.
