= Iustin Frățiman =

Russian and Romanian historian (1870–1927)

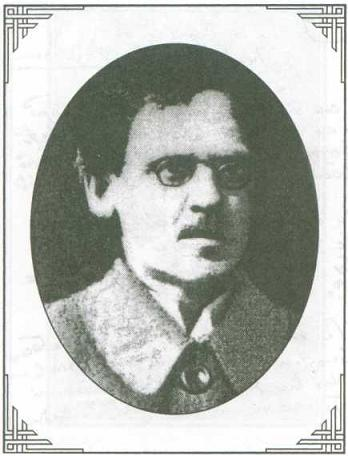
- Frățiman's portrait photograph
- Born: June 1, 1876; Cuhureștii de Jos (Nizshie Kugureshty), Soroksky Uyezd, Bessarabia Governorate, Russian Empire
- Died: September 23, 1927 (aged 51); Cuhureștii de Jos, Soroca County, Kingdom of Romania
- Other name: Yustin Stepanovich Fratsman

Academic work
- Era: 19th and 20th centuries
- Main interests: Ethography, history of Ukraine, church history, archival science

Iustin Ștefan Frățiman, also known as Frațman, Froțman, Frotziman or Frățimanu (Russian: Иустин Степанович Фрацман, romanized: Yustin Stepanovich Fratsman, or Фрациман, Fratsiman; June 1, 1870 – September 23, 1927), was a historian, educator, librarian and political figure from Bessarabia, active in the Russian Empire and the Kingdom of Romania. After receiving a classical education, he worked for various seminaries of the Russian Orthodox Church, moving as far north as Olonets. Frățiman had settled in Soroca by the time of World War I, becoming a champion of Romanian nationalism. This resulted in his being exiled to Central Asia until 1917. Allowed back home after the liberal February Revolution, he resumed his activism, openly campaigning for the national rights of Romanians east of Bessarabia. He was afterwards one of the educators tasked with institutional Romanianization by the Moldavian Democratic Republic.

Frățiman welcomed the union of Bessarabia with Romania in 1918, being an outspoken in his adversity toward Bolshevik Russia; in parallel, he supported autonomy for the Chișinău Archbishopric within the Romanian Orthodox Church. Though elected a corresponding member of the Romanian Academy, he was at odds with the new cultural establishment, especially after a controversial stint as head of Bessarabia's Central Library. Frățiman was not considered for a position at Iași University, and spent his final years lecturing at regional teachers' colleges, before dying in poverty. His final political involvement was with the League of Christian Bessarabians, a far-right group, and the more left-wing Socialist Peasants' Party.

== Biography ==
=== In the Russian Empire ===
The Frățimans originated in Western Moldavia, but were known to have settled in the Bessarabian area around the time of its Russian annexation in 1812. Their descendant A. L. Aizenshtadt suggests that the family was of unclear ethnic origins, noting that their surname is of Moldavian dialectal origin, from frați ("brothers"). The Romanian scholar Gheorghe Ghibănescu, who met Iustin at Cuhureștii de Jos (Nizshie Kugureshty) in August 1912, describes him as a "Moldavian" from a family of middle-class peasants (mazil din neam în neam), and an asset for the Romanian identitarian struggle in the Bessarabian Governorate. As early as 1812, a Teodor Frățiman was attested as a parish priest of the Moldavian Orthodox Church in Cuhureștii. His male descendants were also primarily employed as clergymen or catechists for the Russian Orthodox Church. Some biographical records suggest that Iustin's father was schoolteacher Paul Frățiman, who was fluent in Greek and Church Slavonic; others note that Iustin was one of seven children (five sons and two daughters) born to the priest Ștefan Frățiman and his wife Irina (née Tuchkovska). His brother, Teodor, was a deacon. A cousin, Petru Frățiman (born 1858 or 1859), was already politically active in 1879, joining Axinte Frunză's circle of left-wing radical youths.

Iustin was born a Russian subject on June 1, 1870, with various sources indicating Cuhureștii de Jos as his place of origin. The latter detail was disputed in 1996 by a village schoolteacher, Domnica Botea-Condrea, who reported evidence that, though he lived for most of his life in Cuhureștii, he was in fact born elsewhere. He is known to have attended the religious school in Edineț. He later enlisted at the Orthodox Seminary in Kishinev (Chișinău), where his colleagues included Ion Halippa, Ioan Rufulea, and Nicolae Popovschi. As reported by the latter, Frățiman debated the other two in a philosophical quarrel, founding a school of through that Halippa knew as "Frațmanism" (though Popovschi could not remember its ideological nature beyond its stated opposition to the official textbook, authored by Pyotr Kudryavtsev).

Upon graduating with honors in 1892, Frățiman served as seminary administrator, before moving to the Faculty of Theology in Kazan. He graduated in 1897, as a candidate in theology, thereupon returning to teach at Kishinev's spiritual school (1897–1899). He was finally a graduate of Petersburg University. In 1899, Frățiman was appointed tutor of Greek at the Theological Seminary in Pskov; in June 1904, he took a similar posting in Lyskovo, but left to take up an administrative position in Saint Petersburg. Iustin's works of the period included a biographical essay about the Moldavian bishop Iacob Stamati, published in Russian in 1901. He later resumed work as a teacher: in 1910, he taught Greek and Latin at the Seminary in Olonets. Though admired for his erudition, he received poor marks for his educational performance, including his harshness toward students and his tendency of questioning orders he received from the rectorate. By 1912, to the satisfaction of his superiors, Frățiman had been reassigned to the Orthodox Seminary of Pinsk.

As reported by Ghibănescu, Frățiman had a "Romanian heart" and, on his trips back to Bessarabia, collected and stored Romanian books for his personal library. Linguist Ioan Bianu later suggested that such an endeavor was in itself subversive, since Frățiman intended to publish his documentary fund only as a gift to a future "unified Romania". His training allowed him to teach religion, French language, and world history; his brother Petru had similar interests and, in 1904, helped establish the Bessarabian Historical and Archeological Society. Highly educated for a Bessarabian of that era, Iustin also obtained a diploma from the Imperial Institute of Archeology, being inducted as a full member in 1907.

In 1914–1915, Frățiman had returned to Bessarabia for good, and was employed by the Normal School in Soroca, being allowed by Olga Catargiu to do research in her family's unusually large book collection. His career was interrupted when he began campaigning for the Romanian Latin alphabet and drew suspicion as a "Romanianphile". Scholar Iurie Colesnic sees most of the charges brought up against him as calumnies by "chauvinistic teachers, under the leadership of a certain Khalyutin." According to historian Paul Vataman, he was also punished for his personal stash of banned books, in various languages. In summer 1916, Russian officials had him detained at the penitentiary of Soroca, and subsequently deported to Central Asia, in Turgay Oblast; some authors, including Frățiman himself, suggest that he was also held in Siberia. He reportedly used his time in exile to observe the customs of Moldavian communities in Russia.

=== MDR functionary ===
Frățiman was still absent from Bessarabia during the February Revolution, following which Bessarabia embarked on a process of self-rule, and eventually united with Romania. On May 4, 1917, he and Emanoil Catelli, who represented the Bessarabian Romanian community in Kherson Governorate, addressed a letter to the Russian Provisional Government, asking for the recognition of Romanian rights, and describing "historic Dacia" as an ethnic homeland. In May–June, Frățiman attended the Moldavian Teachers' Congress in Odessa, where he spoke about the issue of Romanian Bessarabian communities in Novorossiya. His resolution, backed by the other delegates, was that Romanian villages in towns should be allowed secular and religious instructions in "Moldavian", rather than the official Russian. Moreover, the Congress pressed for a "Romanian bishopric" to be formed at Dubăsari. Authors such as Onisifor Ghibu and C. Gh. Constantinescu also mention that Frățiman had specifically asked for Romanian-inhabited places in Kherson and Odessa areas to be merged into Bessarabia. Ghibu was in the audience as Frățiman spoke, and reported being unimpressed: "Professor Iustin Frățiman [demands from us] all sort of 'sacrifices'; he is utterly imprecise."

Frățiman returned to Bessarabia by May, when his memoirs of exile were simultaneously hosted by two local newspapers, Svobodnaya Bessarabia and Nash Golos. On June 17, he joined a corpus of teachers tasked with Romanianizing Bessarabian schools, which included the adoption of Latin spellings; he also taught the history of Romania. A Bessarabian Directorate for Schools and Churches was formed in August, being staffed by locals, alongside new arrivals from other Romanian-inhabited regions. The latter group included Ovid Țopa, who admired Frățiman as his only "radical" Bessarabian colleague—in that he alone favored quick Latinization. Ghibu, who supervised the contribution of local teachers, noted that both Frățiman and Alexei Mateevici were enthusiastic and well oriented politically, but incompetent. Ghibu adds:

[Frățiman's] situation was beyond pathetic. Here was a man completely shattered by his long struggles for liberty and for his nation, and only arose in others a feeling of pity, mixed up with admiration for him as a great invalid [...]. His lessons were, from the very beginning, a topic of amusement for his audience, comprised of people who were largely devoid of the reverence that would've been as required toward any other toiler in the field of spiritual culture.

In October, Frățiman applied for a position at his alma mater, the Theological Seminary, affirming his intention to teach all his classes in Romanian. He failed the examination, with preference being given to the more experienced George Tofan and Liviu Marian. Still pursuing an interest in the study of local history and ethnology, he helped establish in early 1918 a Historical and Literary Society (named after Bogdan Petriceicu Hasdeu), and was admitted into the Romanian Academy of Bucharest. From January 1918, Frățiman was a member of the School Board in the Moldavian Democratic Republic (MDR), which had been created as a self-governing entity from the old Bessarabia Governorate. The following month, România Nouă hosted his attack on colleagues such as Alexander Hrișcă-Hriscov, who had voted against the immediate introduction of a Romanian-language curriculum in the MDR's secondary schools. While these had voiced concerns about the availability of qualified teachers, Frățiman had urged for staff to be mass recruited in Romania, Bukovina, and "other lands inhabited by Romanians".

Also then, Frățiman participated in the opening ceremony of Chișinău People University, and gave a speech outlining his critique of Bolshevik Russia. It described various instances of Rumcherod soldiers engaging in vandalism throughout Bessarabia. In March 1918, the republican assembly, Sfatul Țării, gave its endorsement to the Romanian–Bessarabian unification process. In June, he traveled to Iași as a delegate of Chișinău Archbishopric, negotiating the return of Bessarabian parishes under the authority of the Moldavian Metropolis within the enlarged Romanian Orthodox Church. Frățiman and his colleagues attempted to preserve some administrative rights for their regional church, but were instantly rebuked by Metropolitan Pimen, who asked that they submit to the Romanian state in all matters, including religious. Frățiman had returned to Bessarabia by November, when he was assigned to the local chapter of the Romanian State Archives, where he worked alongside Gore, Ștefan Ciobanu, and Sterie Stinghe. In a 1927 piece, Bessarabian journalist H. Block claimed that Frățiman "did nothing" in this capacity, allowing the a generalized decline of the institution.

=== Romanian career ===
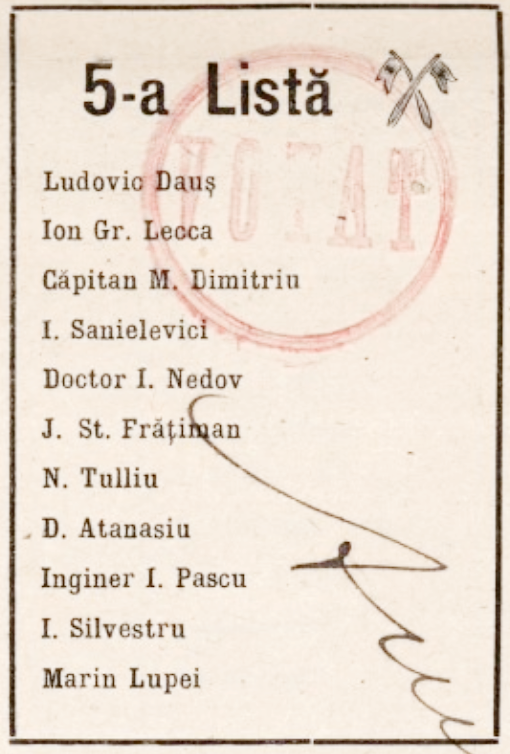
Frățiman, Ludovic Dauș, and Iosif Sanielevici on the Independent Party of Bessarabia ballot, November 1919 election

During elections in November 1919, Frățiman tried but failed to win a seat in the Deputies' Assembly, enlisting with the minor Independent Party of Bessarabia alongside Ludovic Dauș, Sergiu Niță, and Constantin Stere. Frățiman's contribution to the union process also included an article in România Nouă, which argued that the Romanians of Novorossiya needed to be settled back in Romanian-controlled territory, and that Romanian cultural artifacts in Russia had to be repatriated. In December 1919, he was also co-opted by the Cultural League for the Unity of All Romanians, joining its local executive committee—where he served with Romulus Cioflec, Paul Gore, Alexandru Ouatul and others. He settled in Chișinău, where he taught at the Teacher Seminary for Girls; he was not considered for a position at the new Theology Faculty of Iași University, which was operating in the same city. Frățiman's sympathies soon veered into far-right politics—on December 15, 1920, he joined Nicolae Negru's League of Christian Bessarabians, which also recruited former members of the Union of the Russian People.

As noted by fellow historian Nicolae Iorga, Frățiman's academic work comprised studies "of small proportions", but showed his "deep familiarity with sources dealing on the life of his own people, on either side of the Dniester." At the Chișinău archives, he produced a study on the early Moldavian migrations to Kiev. In 1921, Hasdeu Society published Frățiman's monograph regarding church and secular administration among the Romanians of Novorossiya—specifically, in areas now known as "Transnistria". It provided an overview of Romanian localities which, Frățiman argued, existed already in the 1760s under Ottoman Ukraine, and were only reinforced by a "New Moldavian" colonization under Grigory Potemkin. In May 1921, alongside Ciobanu, Dauș, Gore, Daniel Ciugureanu, Vasile Cijevschi, Vladimir Herța and Gherman Pântea, he organized commemorations for Ion C. Brătianu, a founding figure of Romanian liberalism. In January 1922, he was lecturing on "the religious issue in Bessarabia" at the local section of the National Liberal Party.

Frățiman's final activities included his teaching position at Chișinău People's University, in which capacity he also replaced Teodor Porucic as head of Chișinău Central Library (1921–1923). Historian Nina Negru notes that his mandate was not renewed because Frățiman "did not play the games of politics", causing him great distress. Scholar Maria Vieru-Ișaev provides a different interpretation, namely that Frățiman was a "nonconformist", who proved himself "difficult" in his relations with the state bureaucracy. Although demoted in 1922, he refused to turn in the library's inventory until February 1923. Frățiman ran for the Assembly in the elections of March 1922, having registered with the Socialist Peasants' Party branch of Chișinău. The seats in that constituency were carried by the governing National Liberals, with Frățiman only receiving 2,028 votes out of 45,099 voters. He subsequently withdrew to a life of poverty. His credentials were by then being scrutinized and mocked by Flacăra magazine, which argued that he had "no printed work to his name", and that his Academy membership had been awarded based on a promise that he would go on writing.

For a while, Frățiman folded back on politics, and in August 1923 established a "Union of Christians", which advocated for social reform and a "moral uplift" in the Bessarabian provinces. According to Adevărul newspaper, the antisemitic National-Christian Defense League moved in to annex the new organization, but its members voted to reject any association between the two bodies. In November 1926, Pan Halippa employed Frățiman at Astra cultural society's Bessarabian Literary and Philological Section, where he worked alongside Gore. The scholar died in his native village on September 23, 1927, "thus ending a lengthy suffering." Having never married, he was buried in that same locality by his brother Teodor.

== Legacy ==
One of Frățiman's fellow teachers, Vasile Ciubotaru, memorialized him with a 1932 article in the Soroca trade magazine, Solidaritatea. It noted:

His overwhelming but non-ostentatious laughter, his mask of a failure, the powerless torment of his lonesome soul, driven inwards by the regime's rigors. His whole demeanor: his speech, his walk, his clothes—confronting society with the defiance and contempt of a man who, deep down in the hidden recesses of his heart, preserved a priceless treasure. That and only that was the point of his very existence.

On November 2, 1937, the Schoolteachers' Association in Soroca held a commemorative meeting for the "Bessarabian martyrs", including Frățiman and Mateevici alongside Andrei Hodorogea and Simeon G. Murafa. This doubled as a parastas service for the four men. During the late interwar, he had been nearly completely forgotten, though his grave was located and redecorated around 1938 by scouts from the Straja Țării organization. Thirteen years after Frățiman's death, Bessarabia was occupied by the Soviet Union. In the newly established Moldavian SSR, Frățiman's scholarly contribution was simply ignored, with no mention being made of his name in specialized reference works. Following the independence of Moldova in 1991, Frățiman was the subject of encyclopedic entries, topical articles, and conferences. Botea-Condrea, who located his nieces in Cuhureștii, also provided information on his house (which had since been demolished) and his abandoned grave. The latter landmark was restored in 2013 and topped with a new stone cross, donated by Paul Gore Society and the Association of Christian Orthodox Students.
