= Vasile Cijevschi =

Bessarabian-Romanian politician and writer (1880–1931)

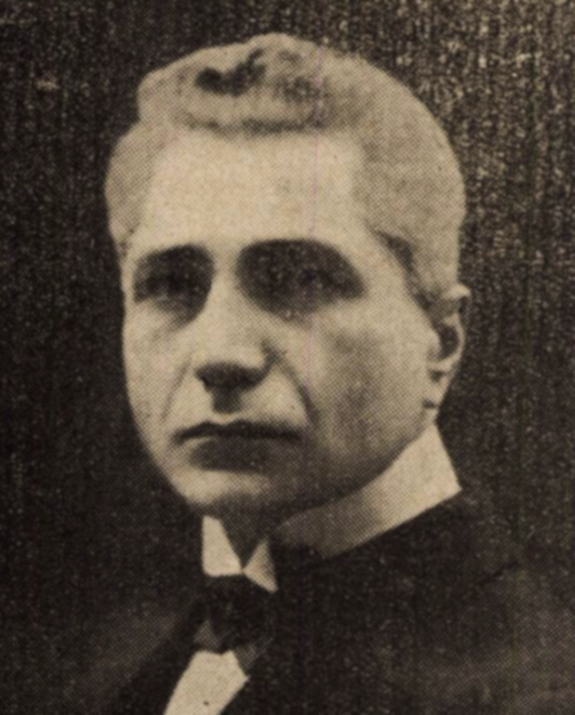
- Cijevschi, ca. 1930
- Born: 29 October [O.S. 17 October] 1880; Zaim, Bender County, Bessarabia Governorate, Russian Empire
- Died: 14 July 1931 (aged 50); Chișinău, Kingdom of Romania
- Burial place: Chișinău Central Cemetery
- Military career
- Allegiance: Russian Empire; Russian Republic; Moldavian Democratic Republic
- Branch: Cavalry
- Rank: Major (Russian Cavalry); Comissar (Bessarabian Army)
- Conflicts: Russo-Japanese War; World War I; Battle of Tannenberg; Russian Civil War
- Other work: Politician, civil servant, diplomat, philologist, writer

Vasile Gheorghe Cijevschi (Russian: Василий Георгиевич Чижевский, romanized: Vasiliy Georgevich Chizhevsky; also credited as Cișevschi, Cijevschii, Cijevski, Cijewsky, or Tchizhevsky; 29 October [O.S. 17 October] 1880 – 14 July 1931) was a Bessarabian and Romanian politician, administrator and writer. Originally a career officer and Orientalist in service to the Russian Empire, he was dispatched to the Far East, in Vladivostok and Khabarovsk, seeing action in the Russo-Japanese War. He was wounded and shielded from active duty, but returned with the start of World War I, managing to survive the Battle of Tannenberg. By the time of the February Revolution, he was a civil servant in Bessarabia, and an affiliate of the Octobrist Party.

Later in 1917, Cijevschi was active within the ethnic Romanian political movement, being increasingly supportive of Romanian nationalism as espoused by the National Moldavian Party; as president of the Soldiers' Congress, he mapped out a plan for Bessarabia's emancipation, and fought against the influence of leftist factions, Esers and Bolsheviks alike. On this platform, he joined the regional assembly, called Sfatul Țării, as well as the executive leadership of the Moldavian Democratic Republic. As the government-appointed Commissar, Cijevschi helped organize defense against leftist insurrection, but denounced Bolshevik infiltration of the Bessarabian troops, which had compromised his plan for action. Ultimately supportive of the Romanian military expedition, he contributed decisively to the Bessarabian–Romanian union in March 1918. He then drifted away from the mainstream nationalist platform, establishing his own National-Democratic Party, and then affiliating with Vladimir Herța's short-lived Romanian League.

Cijevschi was much upset with the centralizing policies of Greater Romania, and in particular with the dissolution of Sfatul—though he continued to work as a civil administrator, and joined the mainstream People's Party, as well as, briefly, the Romanian National Party. Turning to Russian-language journalism, and earning reputation as a polemicist and alleged blackmailer, he is also remembered for his endorsement of Bessarabian identity within Romania, while also still frequenting the nationalist club ASTRA. His critics were alarmed by what they saw as "anti-Romanian" activities, and circulated allegations that he was cultivating known communists. A man of literary and scholarly ambitions, during the early interwar period Cijevschi was a patron of the Bessarabian Art Academy. His various projects were cut short by his death at age 50, reportedly caused by a combination of his old war wounds and disease.

== Biography ==
=== Early life and career ===
Cijevschi was a native of Zaim village, Bender County, at the geographical center of Bessarabia Governorate. In a 1918 record of all Sfatul Țării members, his nationality was indicated as "Moldavian"—a term used in that paper for all the ethnic Romanian or Romanian-speaking delegates; military historian Anatol Munteanu refers to his family as being "Moldavian Romanian", noting that Vasile's ancestors were priests—of the Russian Orthodox Church—who had amassed a sizable family fortune. Activist Romulus Cioflec, who met Cijevschi in late 1917, recalls that he spoke "a poorly mastered, minimal but clean, Romanian language" (o românească greu mânuită și săracă, dar curată). His birth date was 17 October 1880, though some records suggest 1881. Young Vasile was initially destined for a career in the Orthodox clergy, and enlisted at the Bessarabian Theological Seminary. He befriended Ion Pelivan, the emerging leader of Bessarabian Romanians; in June 1898, they heard songs by the "great patriot and true spiritual parent", Dionisie Erhan, at the monastery of Suruceni.

Cijevschi never graduated, preferring to enlist in the Cadet Corps. In 1902, he completed training at a cavalry school in Yelisavetgrad, Kherson Governorate, and was dispatched for guard duty on the Sea of Japan coastline (Primorskaya Oblast), at Vladivostok and Khabarovsk. He reached the rank of Rotmistr (Captain). He was involved in the Russo-Japanese War, when he also received academic training in Oriental studies and prepared for a career in Russian diplomacy. By 1905, he was fighting in Manchuria, where he happened to meet a fellow Bessarabian soldier, Ștefan Usinevici. The latter wrote to Pelivan that October: "I never again ran into Cijevschi, and possibly never will, for such things are now quite impossible, my brother." Caught up in a series of losing battles, Cijevschi was badly injured, and moved back into European Russia—advancing to battalion commander with the official rank of Major, he was honorably discharged on 16 April 1911. He was again called to arms upon the outbreak of World War I in mid 1914, the year which also marked his graduation as a philologist from Saint Petersburg State University. Assigned to the 2nd Army on the Eastern Front, he managed to survive its destruction at Tannenberg. He was allowed to regain civilian life in Bessarabia, settling in Khishinev (Chișinău) as an employee of the local Zemstvo (local government body).

Cijevschi turned to politics during the February Revolution of 1917, originally as a member of the Party of State Order (Octobrists). In April, he was registered as one of six Bessarabian envoys to the Congress of Russian Peoples of the Ukrainian People's Republic, where he prospected the emancipation of Romanians living under nominal Ukrainian rule. Cijevschi's turn to Romanian nationalism was observed by fellow activist Grigore Cazacliu, whom Cijevschi visited in Iași, on the Romanian Front, at some point in mid 1917. As Cazacliu notes: "he pledged his body and his soul to our cause, namely the action for setting free our Bessarabia." As noted by historian Ion Țurcanu, Cijevschi "enjoyed the admiration of Moldavian nationalist combatants", becoming "one of the most educated [and] most influential" among them; the resulting National Moldavian Party elected him as one of the chief delegates. By September 1917, Cijevschi was also involved with the Moldavian Congress of Chișinău, which called for Bessarabian autonomy within the Russian Republic. This institution elected Cijevschi as Commissar for Bessarabia, but, despite the efforts of Bessarabian lobbyists, his appointment was never sanctioned by the Russian Army Command in Mogilev.

Shortly after the October Revolution, Cijevschi helped establish the All-Russian Congress of Moldavian Soldiers, functioning as the first legislative and executive body of Bessarabian autonomists. He was elected President of that Congress, with Ștefan Holban serving as his secretary. As noted by Cioflec, this event witnessed the "most impressive moment" in the development of Romanian nationalism in Bessarabia: Cijevschi's speeches in Romanian alternated with renditions of patriotic songs (including Deșteaptă-te, române! and Pe-al nostru steag e scris Unire), while the attending crowds waved variants of the Romanian tricolor. It was here that, in early November, the Major presented other delegates with the political options that resulted from self-determination—autonomy, (con)federation, and a unitary independent state. Cijevschi also issued orders for applying the ethnic criterion in education, setting aside funds for the "nationalization" of Bessarabian schools, and reprimanding the authorities of Akerman County for resisting this trend.

=== In the 1918 union struggle ===
Confronting the groups of radicalized soldiers, especially the Esers and Bolsheviks, Cijevschi also drafted the first plans for a regional parliament and a Bessarabian military. Both he and Holban signed their names to a Congress proclamation on self-determination, which became legal precedent in the Moldavian Democratic Republic. Following the legislative election of 1917, Cijevschi became a representative of Bender in the new regional assembly, called Sfatul Țării; his mandate officially began on the opening day of 21 November 1917, and saw him mainly active on the Legal and Drafting Commissions. As Pelivan recalls, the Major organized the opening festivities, which saw him reviewing the first Bessarabian troops and planting a Romanian tricolor on the Sfatul Palace. Within this legislature, he also presided upon an all-Romanian faction, the "Moldavian Bloc", which rivaled other ethnic community parties. On 23 November, the Republic appointed Cijevschi Commissar of the Bessarabian army, which was engaged in the effort to contain Bolshevik rebellion. The office had been created on his own suggestion. Upon taking over, he applied his own philosophy for recruitment: instead of creating an all-Romanian military structure, he gave a significant share to members of all ethnic communities. One late report by soldier Dimitrie Bogos notes that Cijevschi's aide-de-camp, Vasile Țanțu, was in charge during November, when the Commissar was incapacitated by disease.

The seriousness of the turmoil created by Russian deserters was underscored on 2 December, when Sfatul established a Commission to Combat Anarchy. Its members were Cijevschi, Țanțu, Vladimir Cristi, and Valentin Prahnițchi. The undertrained republican army could not ultimately deal with the raids carried out by Russian deserters, and Cijevschi resigned his commission on 22 December; the position itself had been made redundant by the creation of a Military Directorate. On 7 December, he was also integrated with the Foreign Directorate as an undersecretary of state, and, later that month, visited the Romanian Kingdom. He reportedly obtained an audience with King Ferdinand I in Iași, presenting him a message on behalf of the Directorate. Cijevschi also returned to the legislative assembly, where, on 31 January, he voiced his opinion that the Bessarabian militias had been "infected by the Bolshevik poison", proposing that they be dissolved (as noted in March by his Sfatul colleague Vasile Harea, he also proposed their absorption by the Romanian Army).

Cijevschi soon became involved in debates with ethnic minority delegates over the adoption of Romanian as the Republic's official language. In February, he was assigned to an editorial committee for Sfatul's eponymous newspaper, transitioning it from a Romanian-titled publication in Russian to an all-Romanian sheet. Also that month, the paper hosted one of his own articles, with which he welcomed the creation of a Moldavian cultural society, Făclia. The piece also featured his instructions to Bessarabian intellectuals that they should combat Bolshevik agitation among the peasants. On 14 March, signalling the Moldavian majority's steady accommodation of Romanian nationalism, Cijevschi was among the deputies who obtained that Pushkin Hall be assigned to Făclia, which had pledged itself to the creation of a Romanian-language theater. Ten days later, he welcomed in Chișinău Constantin Stere, the Bessarabian émigré and senior anti-Russian revolutionary, who had come to champion the project of merging Bessarabia with Romania. Nationalist scholar Onisifor Ghibu, who was a witness to the event, argues that Cijevschi was already more right-wing than Stere: his speech indicated that "a state's existence should be based on national sentiment, rather than on the Russian concept of the state." Stere replied that the Russian Republic was still a decent political model, and claimed to read Cijevschi's message as one of "love between Bessarabia's peoples"; according to Ghibu: "Mr Stere was refusing to even take note of the Bessarabian intelligentsia's nationalist orientation".

At the height of a Romanian military intervention in Bessarabia, Cijevschi's Sfatul Țării campaigning helped swing the vote in favor of union with Romania—as proclaimed by the legislative body on 9 April 1918. Sfatul had hosted the Prime Minister of Romania, Alexandru Marghiloman, who had pleaded for unification, promising in return that Bessarabia would receive the universal male suffrage and a sweeping land reform, while Sfatul would be preserved as the regional assembly. Cijevschi was himself enthusiastic about that bargain, and "held a long and fiery speech in Romanian", pleading with his colleagues that Bessarabia now had an "extraordinary historic opportunity" of twinning national emancipation with social justice. Within Sfatul, he canvassed for an open ballot, which ensured transparency, and therefore also legitimacy. He was also the one to read the act of union in its Russian translation. On the same day, he initiated Stere's election as honorary deputy for Soroca.

=== Autonomist advocacy ===
In the newly unified country, Cijevschi split with the Moldavian Bloc and, on 14 May, created his own parliamentary party, called "National-Democratic Party". According to Țurcanu, the reasons for this change of direction "are insufficiently known"—though they relate to the fact that Cijevschi, like Nicolae Alexandri, Pantelimon Erhan, and Ion Păscăluță, had only endorsed union with a preservation of regional self-rule. Overall, Cijevschi, a man of "great conceit", seemed "partly detached from the ideals which inspired the more enthusiastic Bessarabian fighters, when it came to the full affirmation of the Romanians' national rights", as well as "dispassionate" about the Bloc's projected land reform. According to Munteanu: "He had a particular idea as to the independence that should have been granted to Bessarabia within a Greater Romania, with the boyars' land destined for handing out to peasants and to soldiers who had fought in the various wars."

A new Romanian administration, under Prime Minister Ion I. C. Brătianu, took over in late 1918, introducing centralizing legislation and de-Russification. Cijevschi now openly supported a return to regional autonomy: with Alexandri, Păscăluță, Vasile Ghenzul, and several other Sfatul members, he issued a formal protest against the state of siege and demanded the reintroduction of Russia's Civil Code. Their memorandum was welcomed by the White émigré communities, who took it as proof that Bessarabia was still loyal to the defunct Russian Empire. Cijevschi's parliamentary mandate expired on 27 November 1918. In 1919, he began popularizing his views by means of his own Russian-language newspaper, Golos Kishinyova. In April of that year, he joined the Romanian League, formed around the conservative Vladimir Herța; it attempted to mount opposition to the more left-wing Bessarabian Peasants' Party (PȚB), but finally presented no candidates in the general election of November 1919 (except in Cahul County). Ion Inculeț, the former Moldavian President, was critical of the League. Seeing it as a venue for splitting the nationalist vote, he concluded: "It cannot have ties within the people, since it is made up of landowners." As an exponent of the Bessarabian conservative caucus, Vasile Stroescu admired the League for "[saying] that land reform, in its existing shape, is nothing but land-theft".

After this episode, Cijevschi withdrew from national politics. As argued by Țurcanu, he was partly validated in feeling "disgusted" by the corruption of Brătianu and other Romanian politicians. However, in May 1921, Cijevschi organized commemorations for the prime minister's father, Ion C. Brătianu, recognized a founder of Romanian liberalism; the initiative committee also comprised various other intellectuals, including Herța, Paul Gore, Daniel Ciugureanu, Ștefan Ciobanu, Ludovic Dauș, and Gherman Pântea. Until January 1922, he handled internal affairs for the national government's Bessarabian Directorate, being then replaced by Vasile Bârcă. Still involved with the Moldavian Veterans' Association, and employed for a while by the Chișinău Community Bank, he worked mainly as a civil servant for the Mayor of Chișinău, supervising the local schools. As a speaker of "Oriental languages", he was asked to review the archeological finds at Galilești, but could not read the mysterious inscriptions.

Cijevschi's activity was primarily focused on the Art Academy, which he helped refurbish. Under his watch as head of the local Fine Arts Society (1921–1926), the school was presided upon by sculptor Alexandru Plămădeală; it employed educators who were frowned upon in Romania for their alleged Bolshevik sympathies. During the early 1920s Cijevschi rallied with the People's Party, and edited its regional Russian-language newspaper, Nashe Slovo ("Our Word"). According to a report put out in September 1922 by Adevărul daily, Cijevschi was in fact a political associate of Inculeț, who ended up aligning himself with Brătianu's governing National Liberals; this affiliation also allowed Cijevschi to maintain his position within Chișinău's city government—effectively, as the unelected Vice Mayor. Physician I. Duscian made similar claims in Universul paper, adding allegations that Cijevschi was forcing inmates of public orphanages to only speak Russian.

By March 1923, Cijevschi had established contacts with the opposition Romanian National Party (PNR), which was trying to court Bessarabian voters. As noted by Universul, he was joined in this effort by a diverse group of regionalists, also comprising jaded nationalists such as Pelivan, and one former member of the Black Hundreds. In October, activist Ion Negoiescu alleged that Cijevschi had become a political client of the PNR, which was relying on him to build a regional chapter. According to Negoiescu, this was unacceptable, since Cijevschi, in addition to being "anti-Romanian", had a "penchant for belonging to several political parties at the same time". In his own overview, Transnistrian academic Piotr Șornikov sees Cijevschi as "one of the founders of the Bessarabian autonomist movement", in turn located on the "moderate wing of the Bessarabian liberation movement" and connected to the notion of Moldavian ethnic distinctiveness.

=== Final scandals, illness, and death ===
Meanwhile, the Nashe Slovo team mounted attacks on a local Senator, Iosif Sanielevici, who responded in the rival paper, Novoye Slovo, allegedly calling Cijevschi a blackmailer and a hooligan. Cijevschi had asked for Sanielevici to be tried as a libeler, but his request was denied by the local prosecutor; according to Adevărul, this was the government's way of suggesting that Sanielevici was right about Cijevschi. In October 1924, Inculeț, as the titular Minister for Bessarabia, lifted a temporary ban on the Russian-language newspapers by allowing Cijevschi to put out the daily Bessarabskaya Mysl. Universul was critical of this decision, calling attention to his autonomist stances. It also noted that the two other editors were Constantin Mâțu, previously employed by "Bolshevik gazettes", and Viktor Yakubovich, who had championed Russian imperialism. Cijevschi was also editor of the newspaper Nasha Mysl (1924–1925), but, according to claims aired by Universul, its actual managers were two prominent figures of the National Liberal caucus in Chișinău: Erhan and Vitalie Zubac. According to Universul sources, the party was paying Cijevschi a daily salary of 2,000 lei in exchange for editorial control. After September 1924, Cijevschi was reviving his critique of the National Liberals, voicing his defense of Tatarbunary insurgents. On 7 December 1924, the Sanielevici scandal was taken to the Russian Journalists' Syndicate, with most members reportedly positioning themselves against Cijevschi, whom they depicted as a tool of the deposed Mayor Bârcă and as an immoral "Hottentot".

Cijevschi had by then established another tribune, Bessarabskaya Zhizn, and was involved as head editor of two other publications: Gazeta-Lei and Ghibu's România Nouă. The latter activity also came with Cijevschi's recruitment by Ghibu's nationalist club, ASTRA, whose ideas he helped spread in Bessarabia. By October 1925, Cijevschi had set up his own Citizens' League and Russian paper, Novoye Put, in which efforts he was joined by a former minister of the Ukrainian State, Sergei Hutnik. The new group was openly denounced by the People's Party, whose press declared Cijevschi a "traitor" and a "wrecker of the Romanian schools in Bessarabia"; according to this source, the League was a carrier of anti-Romanian sentiment. Cijevschi was defending the newly formed Bessarabian Metropolis against accusations of "Russophilia", proposing that Russian Orthodoxy was always more developed than in other countries, and that clergymen were always prone to "look eastwards" for religious guidance. In January 1928, on the tenth anniversary of the Moldavian Democratic Republic's independence, he spoke about the need for a "large-scale decentralization" in all Romanian and European regions. He and Cristi appeared alongside their centralizing rivals, including in official photographs of the events—indicating to Țurcanu that their support of autonomy had never turned into full-blown secessionism. In September, he was made an officer of the Star of Romania on behalf of the junior king, Michael I.

On 27 February 1929, Cijevschi was interviewed by Alexandru Terziman for Dimineața daily, criticizing the National Liberal authorities for still maintaining the state of siege. He assessed that there was no real threat of a communist insurgency, since the region's core population were "Moldavian peasants, gentle and hard-working"; in his view, the Romanian public was wrong to demand a ban on Chișinău's Russian-language press, noting that local Russian newspaper were generally anti-communist. He also warned that social turmoil could result from a prolonged administrative abuse, and demanded for a "good an honest administration", with power devolved to a regional government. Around then, Cijevschi was editorial secretary of Bessarabskoye Slovo, a Russian-language daily put out by Ciugureanu. Its publication was followed with concern by Romania's secret police, the Siguranța, which made note that one of Cijevschi's employees, Simon Ocner, had been sentenced as a Soviet spy; the report also assessed that Bessarabskoye Slovo had a readership of 40,000, many of whom were Russophiles and Bessarabian Jews.

During his final decade, Cijevschi dabbled in fiction writing: the short story Unei prietene ("To a Lady Friend") was published by Viața Basarabiei magazine in 1934, allowing readers to discover him as a "subtle writer of prose." The former Commissar died on 14 July 1931, and was buried at the "Armenesc" Central Orthodox Cemetery, Chișinău. Aged 50, he was reportedly killed by "war wounds and some incurable diseases". One of Pelivan's manuscripts, which responds to Soviet claims that Sfatul's deputies had been bought off, notes: "the leaders of the Moldavian Bloc—Vasile Cijevschi and Vasile Tanțu—have lived and died in squalor."

== Legacy ==
As noted in October 1932 by journalist Romulus Dianu, Cijevschi had become an "obscure hero of the Union [...], not granted any honors when he was performing his deeds, nor when he was being laid to rest in that ground he had brought to life". In 1934, a portrait done in bas-relief by Plămădeală was added as decoration to his grave, following a request from his widow; the work was encased in a slab of granite, very similar to the one topping Plămădeală's own grave at "Armenesc". Cijevschi was posthumously honored at the 20th anniversary of Bessarabian autonomy in 1937. Three years later, the Soviet invasion of Bessarabia clamped down on manifestations of Romanian nationalism. As noted by literary historian Iurie Colesnic, the "Armenesc" grave mysteriously escaped being vandalized by the occupiers, possibly because "it is located to the cemetery's edge." In independent, post-Soviet, Moldova, his native village of Zaim became home to a Vasile Cijevschi Public Library.
