= Dumitru Remenco =

Romanian journalist

- Born: 1895; Hagi-Abdul
- Died: July 13, 1940 (aged 44–45); Chişinău
- Resting place: Central cemetery on Armenească Street, Chişinău
- Citizenship: Romania
- Education: Alexandru Ioan Cuza University
- Occupation: Journalist
- Known for: his activity as a journalist
- Spouse: Alexandra Scodigor-Remenco (1897-1959)
- Children: Gheorghe Remenco (November 19, 1918, Chişinău - October 29, 1977, Chişinău), Sergiu (b. Chişinău)
- Parent(s): Ion Dm. Remenco, Olga

Dumitru I. Remenco (1895 - July 13, 1940) was a Romanian journalist and philosopher from Chişinău, Bessarabia. He was a contributor at major newspapers of Bessarabia, such as Cuvânt moldovenesc, Viaţa Basarabiei, Glasul Basarabiei, Timpul.

== Biography ==
Dumitru I. Remenco was born in 1895, in Hagi-Abdul, Ismail. He studied at Bolgrad and Odessa and, from 1919, at Alexandru Ioan Cuza University. During 1916-1917, while he was on the Romanian front, Remenco became a friend of Alexei Mateevici. In the fall of 1917, Dumitru I. Remenco married to Alexandra Remenco (1897–1959) from Peresecina and they had two children, Gheorghe Remenco (November 19, 1918, Chişinău - October 29, 1977, Chişinău) and Sergiu (b. Chişinău).

In 1921, Remenco he was a founder member of "Societatea de Belle - Arte din Basarabia". Dumitru I. Remenco worked as a journalist at La Răspântie (1921), Cuvânt moldovenesc, Raza, Viaţa Basarabiei, Glasul Basarabiei in Chişinău. He was a correspondent for the newspapers Timpul and Argus in Bucharest. Remenco was a friend of Nichifor Crainic, Vasile Ţepordei.

After the Soviet occupation of Bessarabia, he stayed in 1940, but was arrested and killed himself on July 13, 1940. He was buried at the Central cemetery on Armenească Street, Chişinău.

== Works ==
- Remenco, Dumitru, Secretul prosperităţii presei locale, Viaţa Basarabiei, 1933, nr. 163.
- Remenco, Dumitru, Minoritarii şi Unirea, Viaţa Basarabiei, din 9 apr. 1933.
- Remenco, Dumitru, Bolşevicii şi Basarabia, Viaţa Basarabiei, anul I, Nr. 1.
- Remenco D., Influenta psihologiei sociale rusesti asupra Basarabiei // Viaţa Basarabiei, 1933, no 4, pp. 99–103.

== Bibliography ==
- Iurie Colesnic, Destinul tragic al unui filozof din Basarabia interbelică: [despre Dumitru Remenco (1895–1940), filozof, ziarist la "Cuvânt moldovenesc", "Glasul Basarabiei", Viaţa Basarabiei, 2004, Nr. 2. pp. 210–220.
- Donos, Alexandru. În dar oamenilor: [Schiţă despre jurnalistul Gheorghe Remenco] // Nistru, 1979, Nr. 7, pp. 115–121.
