= Ardealul =

- Founder: Onisifor Ghibu
- Editor-in-chief: Onisifor Ghibu
- Staff writers: Ion Matei, A. Gheorghiu, V. Cijevski, A. Murafa
- Founded: October 1, 1917
- Ceased publication: January 1918 (successor: România Nouă)
- Language: Romanian
- Headquarters: Chişinău

Ardealul (English: Transylvania) was a weekly newspaper from Chişinău, the Moldavian Republic, founded by Onisifor Ghibu in October 1917. Initially, the newspaper was published weekly, later appeared three times a week. After January 1918, its successor was the daily newspaper România Nouă.

== Bibliography ==
- Almanahul dicţionar al presei din România şi a celei româneşti de pretutindeni de G. Caliga. – București, 1926. – p. 155.
