= Gazeta Basarabiei (1923) =

1923 newspaper from Chișinău, Moldova

- Editor: Ion Pelivan and Constantin Mâțu
- Founded: 1923
- Ceased publication: 1923
- Language: Romanian
- Headquarters: Chișinău

Gazeta Basarabiei (English: Bessarabia Gazette) was a newspaper from Chișinău, Bessarabia, founded in 1923.

== Overview ==
Between 24 October and 17 November 1923, Gazeta Basarabiei was a weekly of the Romanian National Party, edited by Ion Pelivan and Constantin Mâțu. A publication of the same name, Gazeta Basarabiei, was founded in 1935.

== Bibliography ==
- Constantin Mâțu, O necessitate desconsiderată: Presa românească în Basarabia, Chișinău, 1930.
- Eugen Ștefan Holban, Dicționar cronologic: Prin veacurile învolburate ale Moldovei dintre Prut și Nistru, Chișinău, 1998.
