= Serghei Ciuhrii =

Moldovan conductor and composer (1938–2023)

- Born: 2 August 1938; Moara de Piatră, Bălți County, Romania (now Drochia District, Moldova)
- Died: 7 March 2023 (aged 84) Chișinău, Moldova
- Genres: Moldovan folk music
- Occupations: Conductor; composer; music professor
- Years active: 1963–2023

Serghei Ciuhrii (2 August 1938 – 7 March 2023) was a Moldovan conductor, composer, and music professor. He was the artistic director and conductor of the folk music orchestra Fluieraș from 1995 to 2013 and taught for more than three decades at the Academy of Music, Theatre and Fine Arts in Chișinău. In 1992 he was awarded the honorary title of People's Artist of the Republic of Moldova.

== Early life and education ==
Ciuhrii was born on 2 August 1938 in the village of Moara de Piatră, then in Bălți County and today part of Drochia District, Moldova. He studied choral conducting at the Ștefan Neaga music school in Chișinău from 1958 to 1963 under Ana Moldovean and Tamara Mițu, and later studied orchestral conducting at the Gavriil Musicescu Institute of Arts in Chișinău from 1979 to 1984 under Anatoli D. Stolearov.

== Career ==
Ciuhrii began his career as leader of the variety orchestra of the Chișinău Youth House (1963–1964) and then spent a year as a guitarist in the variety orchestra of the Philharmonic in Yuzhno-Sakhalinsk, Russia (1964–1965). From 1965 to 1982 he worked as a methodologist at the House of Folk Creation in Chișinău.

In 1970 he became conductor of the folk music orchestra Mărțișor of the Chișinău Youth House, with which he made recordings for Radio Chișinău. The Moldovan Minister of Culture Sergiu Prodan later recalled dancing in the Mărțișor ensemble as a schoolboy under Ciuhrii's direction, crediting the conductor with teaching young performers how folk music is expressed through dance.

From 1986 to 1988 Ciuhrii served on the repertoire board of the Ministry of Culture of the Moldavian SSR. He joined the faculty of the Gavriil Musicescu Conservatory (now the Academy of Music, Theatre and Fine Arts) as a lecturer in 1988, became an associate professor in 1993, and was made a full university professor in 2012, teaching there until the end of his life.

In 1995, following the death of Serghei Lunchevici, Ciuhrii was appointed artistic director and conductor of the folk music orchestra of the Fluieraș song and dance ensemble, one of Moldova's leading folk orchestras, a position he held until 2013. The ensemble was based at the Nicolae Sulac National Palace in Chișinău, where he worked for more than a decade.

== Compositions and collaborations ==
Ciuhrii composed choral and orchestral music and wrote hundreds of pieces and arrangements for folk orchestra, instrumentalists, and singers. Recordings of his works are held in the "golden collection" of Moldova's national radio and television archive. He published several collections of scores, including Plopule, copac frumos (arrangements and original works for choir), Pe strune de vioară (original pieces and works for folk orchestra), and Melodii de pe coline (scores for folk orchestra).

He collaborated with many leading Moldovan folk performers, including Valentina Cojocaru, Maria Sarabaș, Vadim Gheorghelaș, Nicolae Botgros, Valentin Golomoz, Tudor Rusu, Valeriu Hâncu, Zinaida Julea, Larisa Arseni, and Constantin Rotaru. He was a member of the Union of Musicians of Moldova.

== Awards and honours ==
- Honoured Worker of Culture of the Republic of Moldova (1979)
- People's Artist of the Republic of Moldova (1992)
- Order of Gloria Muncii (1998)

== Death and legacy ==
Ciuhrii died on 7 March 2023 at the age of 84. His death was announced by the singer Nătălița Munteanu, his goddaughter, and by the Minister of Culture Sergiu Prodan, who described him as "a reference name in the creation and promotion of folk music" and "a true servant of culture". He was buried on 10 March 2023 following a ceremony at the Nicolae Sulac National Palace in Chișinău, the home of the Fluieraș ensemble. On 12 March 2023, TVR Moldova broadcast a memorial tribute to the conductor.
