= Vântu =

Vântu is a Romanian surname. Notable people with the surname include:

- Cristian Vântu (born 1973), Romanian doctor and politician
- Mihail Vântu (1873–1943), Romanian politician and journalist
- Sorin Ovidiu Vântu (born 1955), Romanian convicted criminal and businessman
