= Alexandra Remenco =

- Born: 1895; Peresecina
- Died: 1959 (aged 63–64); Chişinău
- Resting place: Central cemetery on Armenească Street, Chişinău
- Citizenship: Romania
- Education: Odessa University
- Occupation: Educator
- Known for: her activity as a teacher
- Spouse: Dumitru Remenco
- Children: Gheorghe Remenco (November 19, 1918, Chişinău – October 29, 1977, Chişinău), Sergiu (b. Chişinău)
- Parent(s): Ion Dm. Remenco, Olga

Alexandra Scodigor-Remenco (1897–1959) was a Romanian educator from Chişinău, Bessarabia. She founded an orphanage in 1929 that became a model institution for pre-school education in Romania. The orphanage was visited by Maria Montessori in 1938, when Alexandra Remenco was invited to the Vatican for an audience with Pope Pius XI.

== Biography ==
Alexandra Scodigor was born in 1897, in Peresecina and studied in Orhei and Odessa. In the fall of 1917, Scodigor married to Dumitru Remenco and they had two children, Gheorghe Remenco (November 19, 1918, Chişinău – October 29, 1977, Chişinău) and Sergiu (b. Chişinău).

In 1929, she founded the orphanage "Casa copilului", which became a model institution for pre-school education. Her efforts became known in Romania and elsewhere. In 1938 the orphanage was visited by Maria Montessori, who encouraged her ideas at a conference in Rome. That same year Alexandra Remenco was invited to the Vatican for an audience with Pope Pius XI to come.

After the Soviet occupation of Bessarabia, the orphanage was closed. Remenco withdrew back to this in the near Ploiești, where she worked as a nurse. After World War II she worked as a teacher at a primary school in Chişinău. She was buried at the Central cemetery on Armenească Street, Chişinău.

== Bibliography ==
- Donos, Alexandru. În dar oamenilor: [Schiţă despre jurnalistul Gheorghe Remenco] // Nistru, 1979, Nr. 7, pp. 115–121.
- Iurie Colesnic, Destinul tragic al unui filozof din Basarabia interbelică: despre Dumitru Remenco (1895–1940), filozof, ziarist la "Cuvânt moldovenesc", "Glasul Basarabiei", Viaţa Basarabiei, 2004, Nr. 2. pp. 210–220.
