= Gheorghe Remenco =

- Born: November 19, 1918; Chişinău
- Died: October 29, 1977 (aged 58)
- Resting place: Central cemetery on Armenească Street, Chişinău
- Citizenship: Romania, USSR
- Occupation: Journalist
- Known for: his activity as a journalist
- Parent(s): Alexandra Remenco and Dumitru Remenco
- Relatives: Sergiu (brother, born Chişinău)

Gheorghe Remenco (November 19, 1918 - October 29, 1977) was a journalist and author from Chişinău, Bessarabia, son of Alexandra Remenco and Dumitru Remenco.

== Works ==
- Lielie ciocârlie (despre cântăreaţa Tamara Ciobanu), Chişinău, 1964.
- Prin Chişinău odinioară şi azi, (Chişinău, 1966),
- La baştina frumosului (Chişinău, 1970),
- Comoara noastră - monumentele, (Chişinău, 1977)

== Bibliography ==
- Donos, Alexandru. În dar oamenilor: [Schiţă despre jurnalistul Gheorghe Remenco] // Nistru, 1979, Nr. 7, pp. 115–121.
- Iurie Colesnic, Destinul tragic al unui filozof din Basarabia interbelică: despre Dumitru Remenco (1895-1940), filozof, ziarist la "Cuvânt moldovenesc", "Glasul Basarabiei", Viaţa Basarabiei, 2004, Nr. 2. pp. 210–220.
