= Rosalia Spirer =

Soviet Moldavian architect

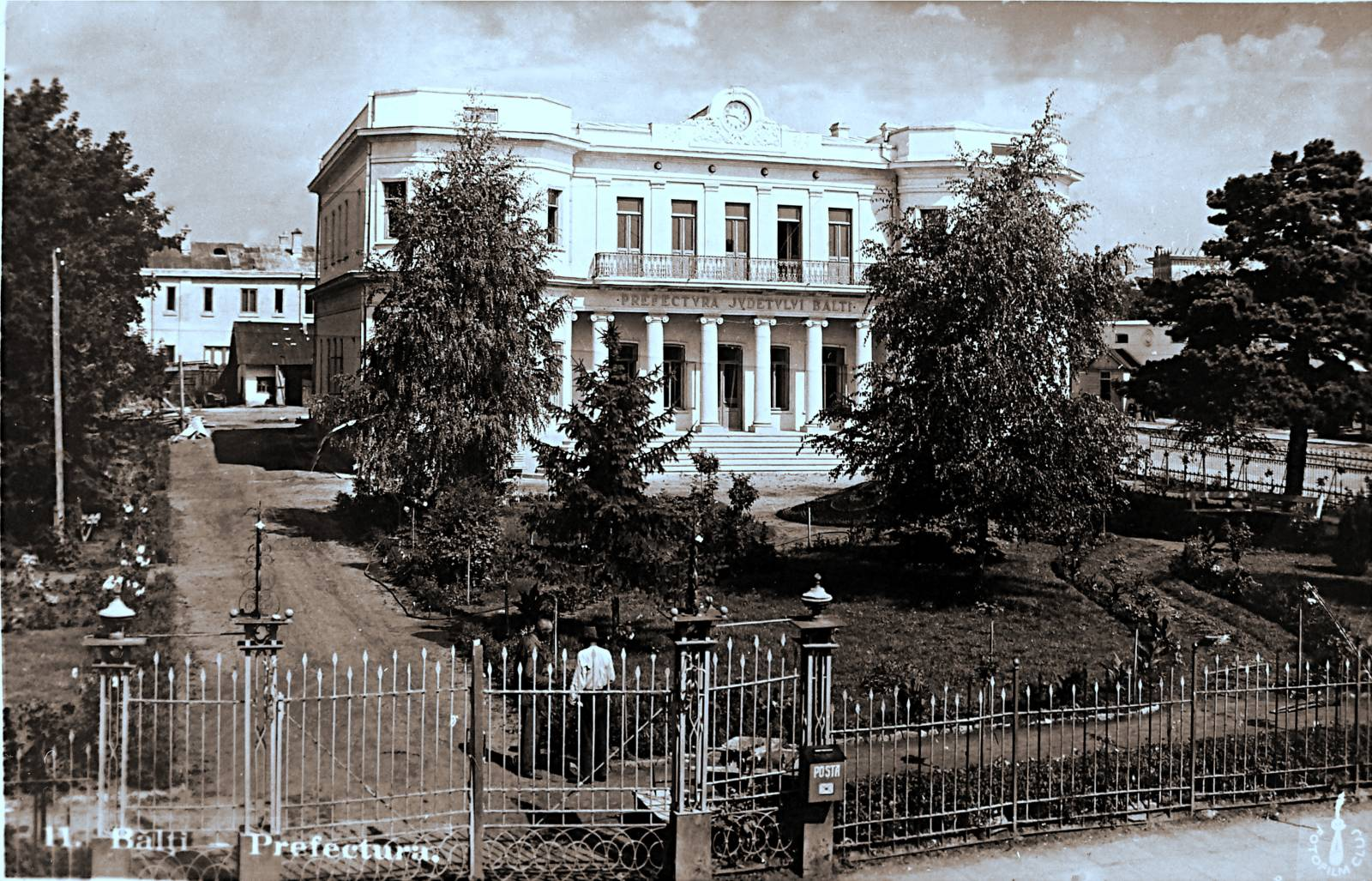
The Bălți Prefecture after its expansion by Rosalia Spirer

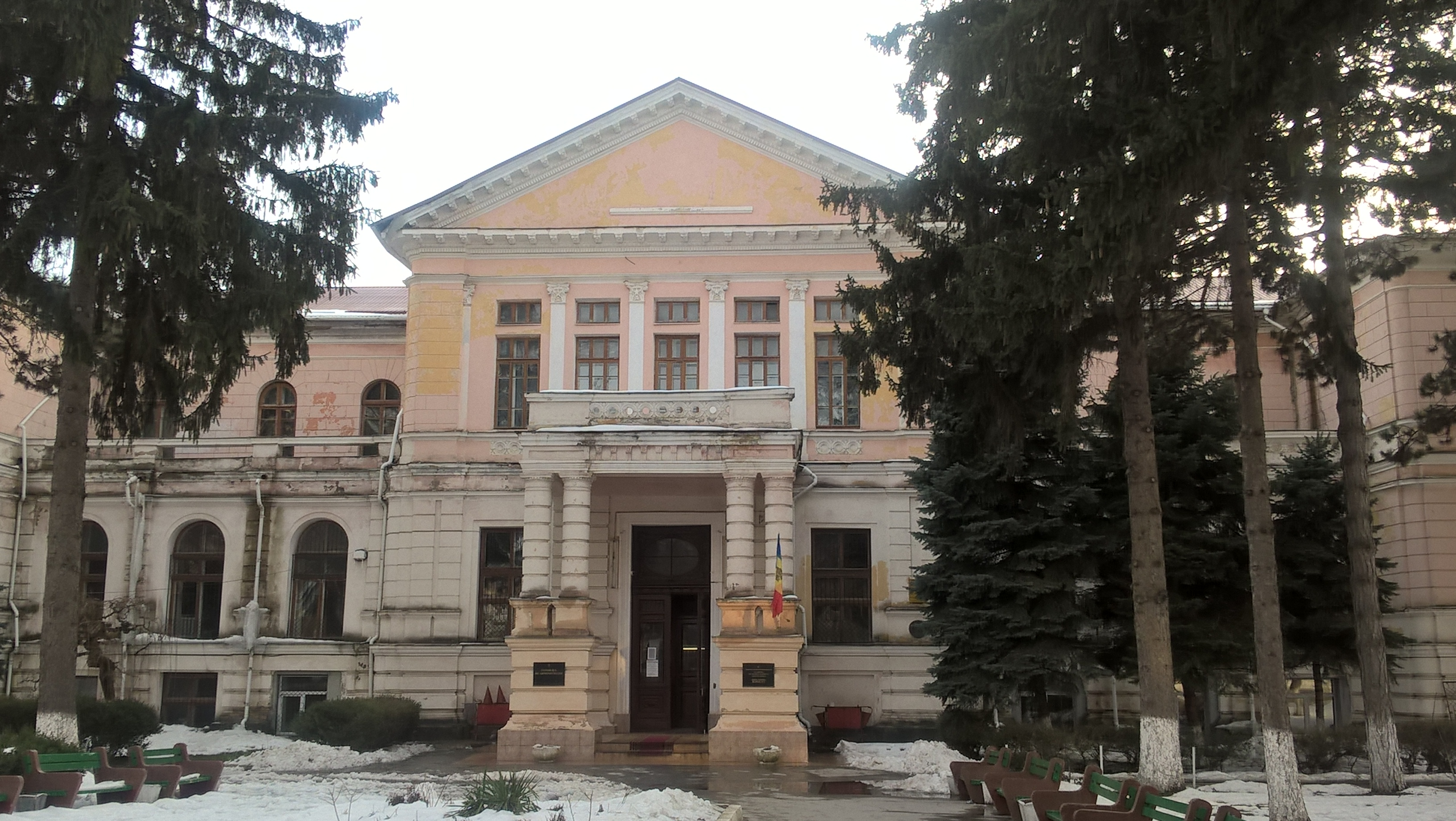
Sfatul Țării Palace

Rosalia Spirer, also Etti-Rosa Spirer (16 April 1900 – 30 March 1990), was a Romanian-born Soviet Moldavian architect.

Born in Galați, in the Romanian Old Kingdom, Spirer was one of five children, four girls and a boy, in a Jewish family. Her father, Ludwig, was an estate manager while her mother, a housewife, instructed her in needlework. After completing high school, she studied architecture at the Bucharest Superior School of Architecture, graduating in 1925.

In 1932, she moved to Bălți, in the Bessarabia province of what had become Greater Romania. There, as the only trained architect, she oversaw architectural planning, including expansion of the prefecture building. During the Second World War, she worked on a farm in the Saratov region, although she spoke no Russian. In 1944, she returned to Bessarabia, much of which was now part of the Moldavian SSR within the Soviet Union. There, she worked in the republic's capital of Chișinău renovating the Zhdanov Library, now the Municipal Library (1946), the Ministry of Finance building (1948), and the Sfatul Țării Palace (1950). She went on to design multi-storey residential buildings.

Spirer remained in good health until the end. She died on 30 March 1990, at age 89.

== Literature ==
- Berkovich, Gary. Reclaiming a History. Jewish Architects in Imperial Russia and the USSR. Volume 3. Socialist Realism: 1933–1955. Weimar und Rostock: Grunberg Verlag. 2022. P. 107. ISBN 978-3-933713-64-3.
