= Grigore Constantinescu =

Grigore D. Constantinescu
- Born: February 15, 1875; Iaşi
- Died: April 7, 1932 (aged 57); Năpădeni
- Resting place: Năpădeni; 47°23′55″N 28°9′11″E
- Occupations: Professor, Priest, Journalist
- Employer: Chişinău Theological Seminary
- Children: 10

Grigore D. Constantinescu (February 15, 1875 in Iaşi – April 7, 1932 in Năpădeni) was a priest and journalist from Romania. He was the director of Glasul Basarabiei.

== Biography ==
Grigore D. Constantinescu was born on February 15, 1875, in a family of a priest from Iaşi, Romania. He studied in Iaşi (1888–1896) and Kiev (1897–1902) and worked for the Romanian Consulate to Odessa (1904–1906) and professor of Romanian language at the Chişinău Theological Seminary and Diocesan Girls' School in Chişinău (1906–1918), priest in Chişinău (1918–1919) and in Năpădeni (1919–1932). He had ten children

Constantinescu was a contributor to Basarabia (newspaper) and from January 1, 1908, on, he was the Editorial Secretary of Luminătorul. Constantinescu was the founder and director of Glasul Basarabiei (1913–1914).

== Bibliography ==
- Iurie Colesnic, Basarabia necunoscuta, Ed. Universitas, Chisinau, 1993; vol. 1.
- Viaţa Basarabiei, ANUL I. No.4 Aprilie 1932.
- Almanahul dicţionar al presei din România şi a celei româneşti de pretutindeni de G. Caliga. – București, 1926. – P. 155.
