= Gazeta Basarabiei =

Romanian newspaper

- Editor-in-chief: V. Boldescu
- Editor: Ion T. Costin
- Founded: 1935
- Ceased publication: 1940
- Language: Romanian
- Headquarters: Chișinău

Gazeta Basarabiei (English: Bessarabia Gazette) was a newspaper from Chișinău, Bessarabia, founded in 1935.

== Overview ==
Between 24 October and 17 November 1923, Gazeta Basarabiei was a weekly of the Romanian National Party, edited by Ion Pelivan and Constantin Mâțu.

Between November 14, 1935 and 1940, Gazeta Basarabiei was an independent newspaper ("Ziar popular independent de pură informație"), directed by Ion T. Costin and V. Boldescu served as editor in chief.

== Bibliography ==
- Constantin Mâțu, O necessitate desconsiderată: Presa românească în Basarabia, Chișinău, 1930.
- Eugen Ștefan Holban, Dicționar cronologic: Prin veacurile învolburate ale Moldovei dintre Prut și Nistru, Chișinău, 1998.
