= Cuhureștii de Jos =

- Commune
- Location in Moldova
- Coordinates: 47°55′N 28°35′E
- Country: Moldova
- District: Florești District
- Elevation: 696 ft (212 m)

Population (2014)
  - Total: 1,938
- Time zone: UTC+2 (EET)
  - Summer (DST): UTC+3 (EEST)
- Postal code: MD-6643
- Area code: +373 250

Cuhureștii de Jos is a commune in Florești District, Moldova, near the border with Ukraine. It is composed of two villages, Cuhureștii de Jos and Țipordei.

== Notable people ==
- Iustin Frățiman
