= Alexandru Ioan Cuza, Cahul =

Alexandru Ioan Cuza
- Village
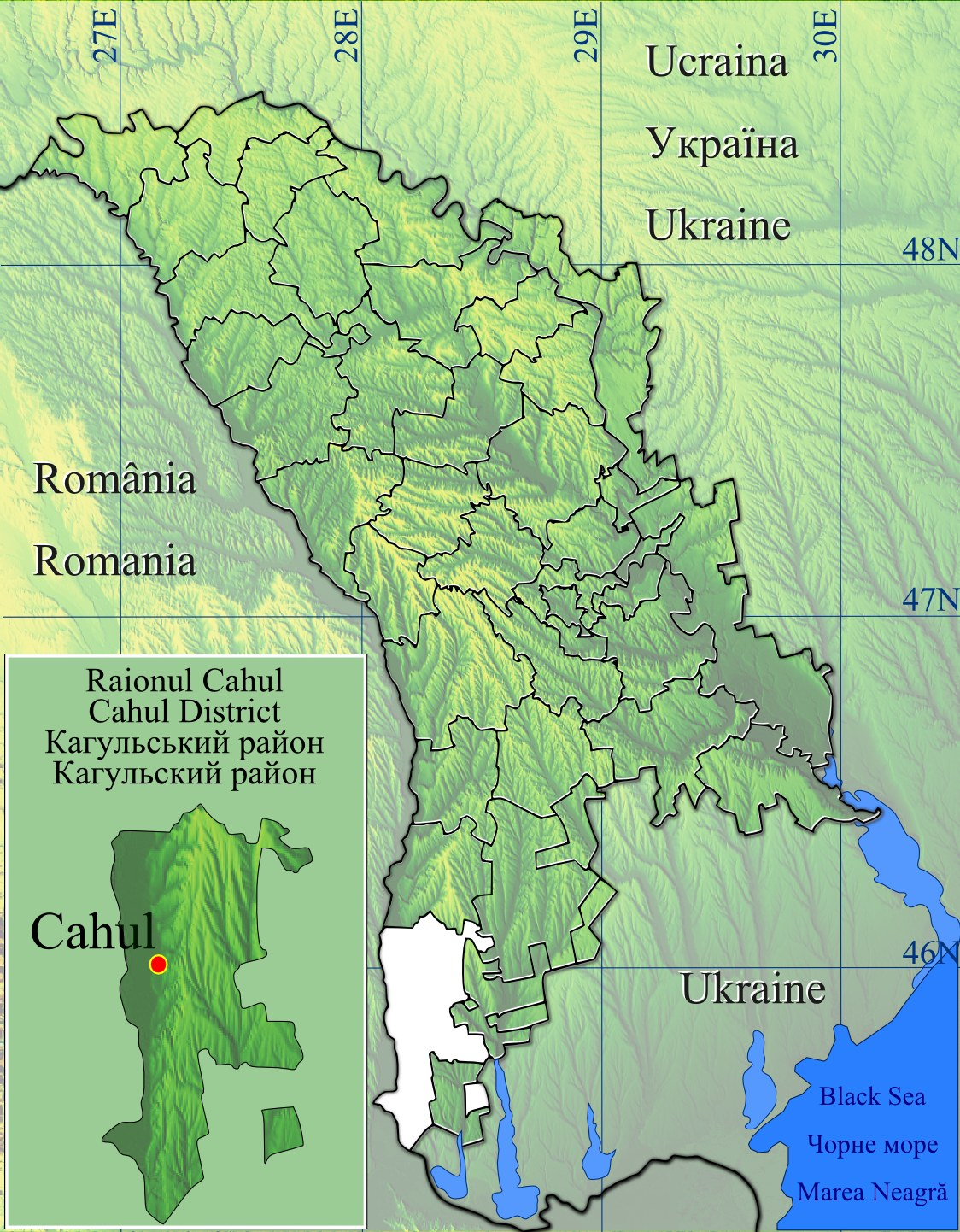
- Location of village within Moldova
- Coordinates: 45°36′N 28°27′E
- Country: Moldova
- District: Cahul District
- Elevation: 115 ft (35 m)

Population (2014 census)
  - Total: 2,447
- Time zone: UTC+2 (EET)
  - Summer (DST): UTC+3 (EEST)

Alexandru Ioan Cuza is a village in Cahul District, Moldova.

== Notable people ==
- Mihail Vântu
- Gheorghe Hioară
- Ana Guțu
- Dumitru Remenco
