= Peresecina =

- village and commune
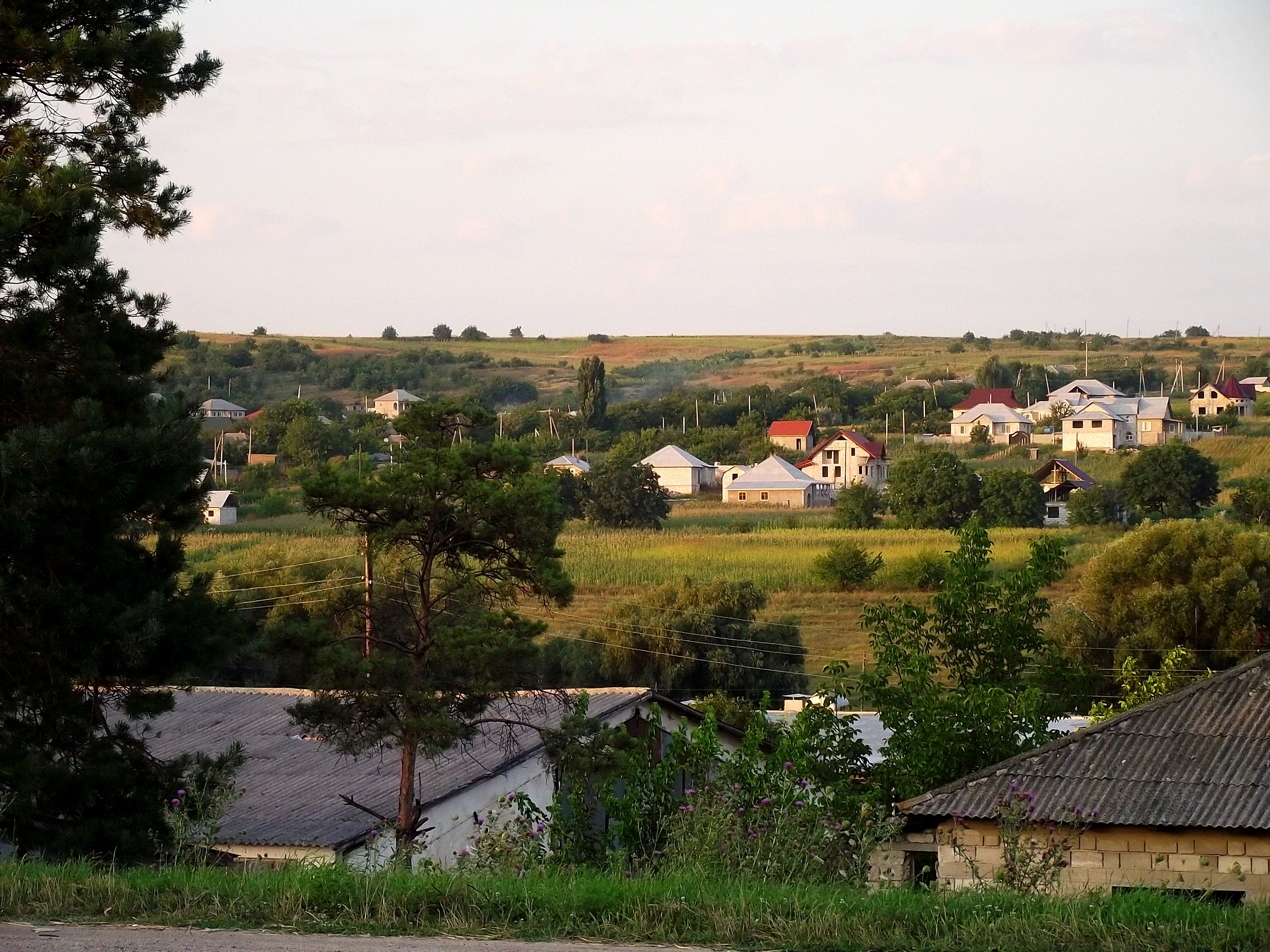

- Location in Moldova
- Coordinates: 47°15′N 28°46′E
- Country: Moldova
- District: Orhei District

Population (2014 census)
  - Total: 7,816
- Time zone: UTC+2 (EET)
  - Summer (DST): UTC+3 (EEST)

Peresecina is a village in Orhei District, Moldova.

== Notable people ==
- Sergiu Niță
- Radu Sîrbu
- Alexandra Remenco
