= Mihail Vântu =

Romanian writer and engineer (1873–1943)

Member of the Parliament of Romania
- In office 1918–1920

Personal details
- Born: 1873 Hagi-Abdul
- Died: 28 December 1943 (aged 69–70) Ploieşti
- Resting place: Ploieşti
- Party: National Moldavian Party
- Education: University of Bucharest

Mihail Vântu (1873, Hagi-Abdul – 28 December 1943, Ploieşti) was a politician and journalist from Romania. He served as a member of the Parliament of Romania and worked for Cuvânt moldovenesc.

== Biography ==
Mihail Vântu was born in 1873 in Hagi-Abdul and studied in Reni and Bairamcea (near Cetatea Albă). Then became a teacher in Ciocîlteni, Orhei. He advocated the use of the Romanian language in schools. As a member of the Cadet Movement, Mihail Vântu participated at the meetings in Kiev and St Petersburg. In 1906, in the context of the revolution, he was a founder of Basarabia, a newspaper closed by the Russian authorities in 1907. In 1917-1918, he worked for Cuvânt moldovenesc, the newspaper of the National Moldavian Party.

Mihail Vântu served as senator in the Parliament of Romania. After the political career, he graduated from the University of Bucharest and became an engineer in Ploieşti, where became the director-general of the «Societatea petroliera "Orion"».
