= România Nouă =

Moldavian newspaper

- Founder: Onisifor Ghibu
- Editor-in-chief: Onisifor Ghibu
- Staff writers: Ion Matei, A. Gheorghiu, V. Cijevski, A. Murafa
- Founded: January 1918
- Ceased publication: 1927
- Language: Romanian
- Headquarters: Chişinău

România Nouă (English: New Romania) was a newspaper from Chişinău, the Moldavian Republic, founded by Onisifor Ghibu in January 1918. It was the successor of Ardealul. România Nouă was published between 24 January – 2 December 1918 and 1 June 1926 – 1 June 1927.

== Bibliography ==
- Almanahul dicţionar al presei din România şi a celei româneşti de pretutindeni de G. Caliga. – București, 1926. – P. 155.
