= Dolní Lochov =

- Municipality
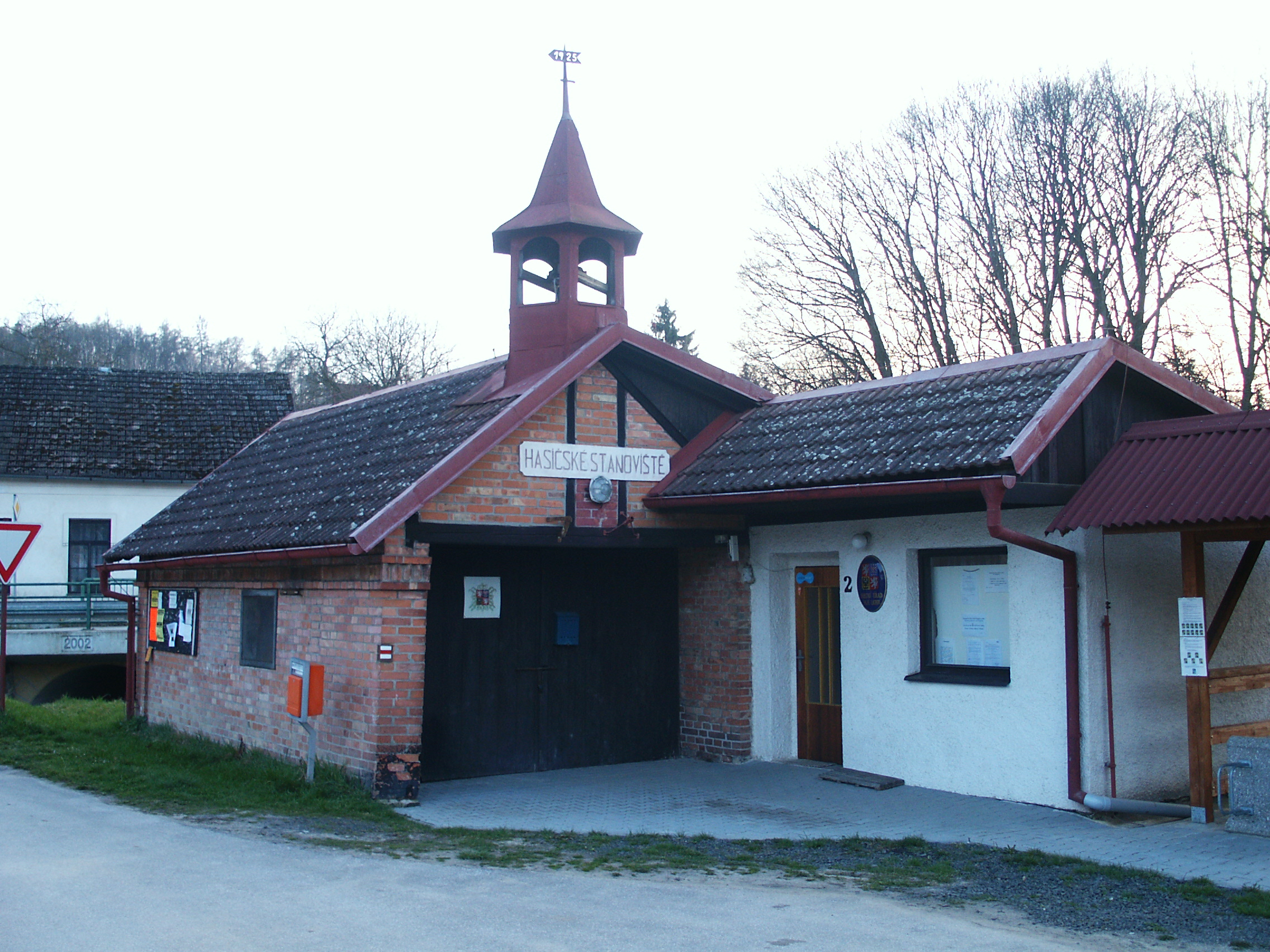
- Municipal office and firehouse

- Location in the Czech Republic
- Coordinates: 50°27′10″N 15°17′12″E
- Country: Czech Republic
- Region: Hradec Králové
- District: Jičín
- First mentioned: 1385

Area
  - Total: 1.59 km^{2} (0.61 sq mi)
- Elevation: 298 m (978 ft)

Population (2026-01-01)
  - Total: 58
  - Density: 36/km^{2} (94/sq mi)
- Time zone: UTC+1 (CET)
  - Summer (DST): UTC+2 (CEST)
- Postal code: 506 01
- Website: www.dolnilochov.cz

Dolní Lochov is a municipality and village in Jičín District in the Hradec Králové Region of the Czech Republic. It has about 60 inhabitants.

== Demographics ==
Historical population
Year	Pop.	±%
1869	157	—
1880	166	+5.7%
1890	156	−6.0%
1900	154	−1.3%
1910	141	−8.4%
1921	136	−3.5%
1930	131	−3.7%
1950	105	−19.8%
1961	110	+4.8%
1970	85	−22.7%
1980	61	−28.2%
1991	46	−24.6%
2001	52	+13.0%
2011	53	+1.9%
2021	47	−11.3%
Source: Censuses
