= Sfatul Țării Palace =

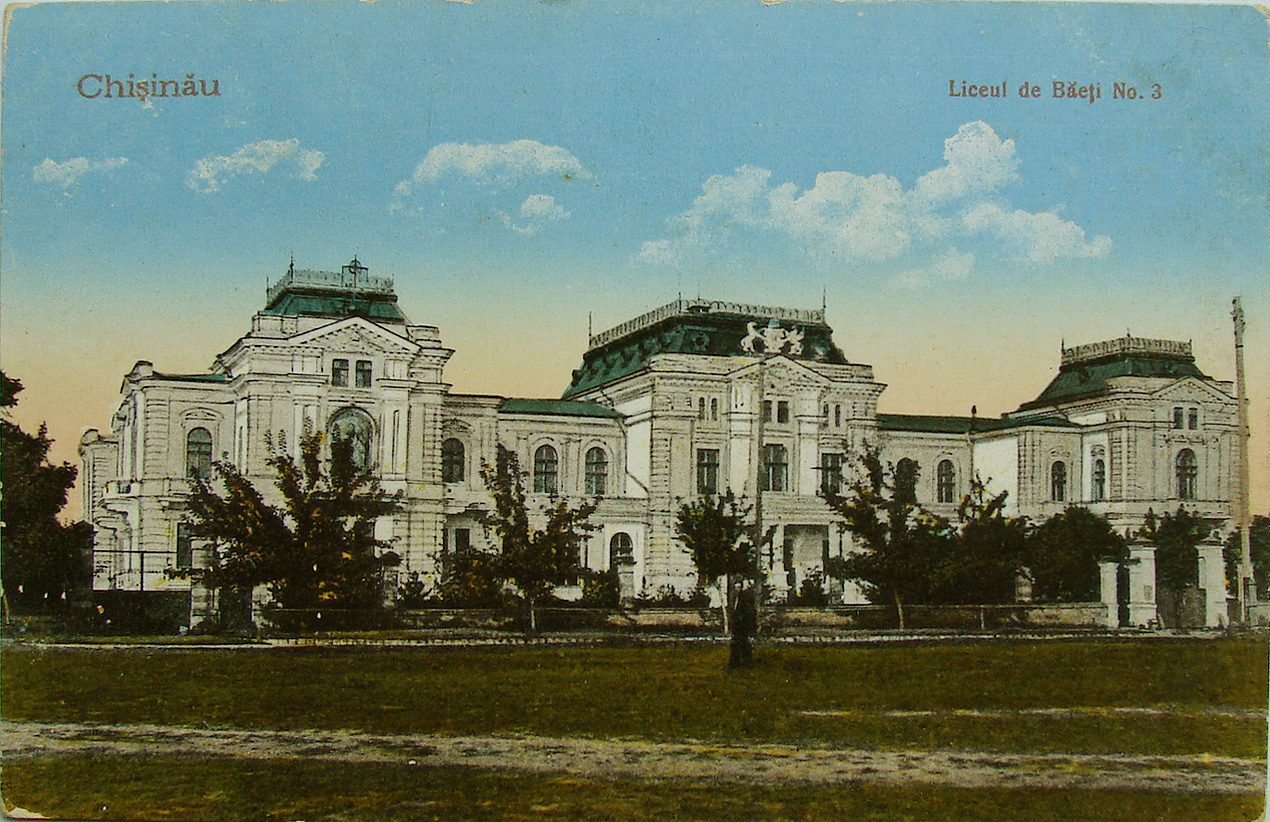
- Interactive map of the Sfatul Țării Palace area

General information
- Location: 111 Alexei Mateevici
- Coordinates: 47°1′20″N 28°49′2″E
- Construction started: 1902
- Inaugurated: 1905
- Renovated: 1950s (architect Rosalia Spirer)

Design and construction
- Architect: Vladimir N. Țâganco

The Sfatul Țării Palace is a building in Chișinău, Moldova.

== Overview ==
The building is located near Central Chișinău. It served as a meeting place for the Sfatul Țării, the assembly which proclaimed the independence of the Moldavian Democratic Republic in 1917 then union with Romania in 1918. The building was heavily damaged in the Second World War. It is currently home to the Academy of Music, Theatre and Fine Arts.

== Gallery ==
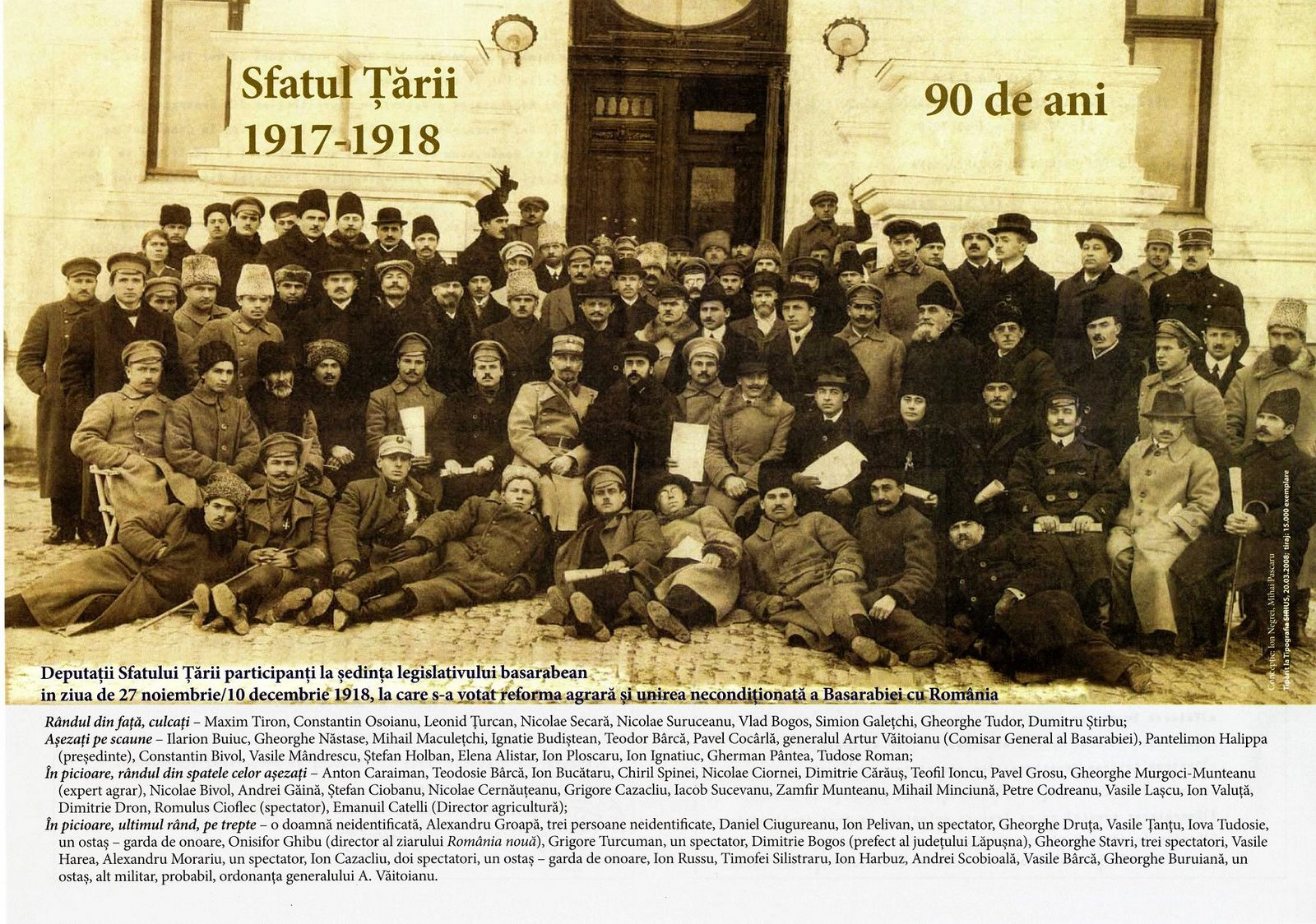
Sfatul Țării Palace, 10 December 1918

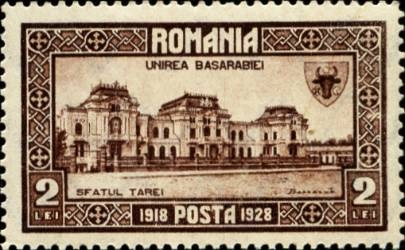
1928 stamp

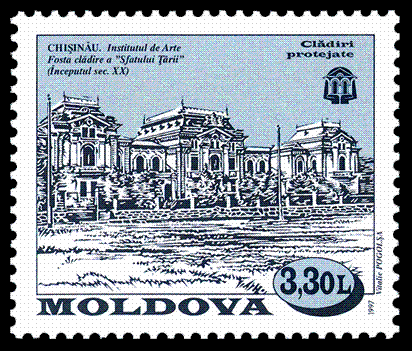
1997 stamp

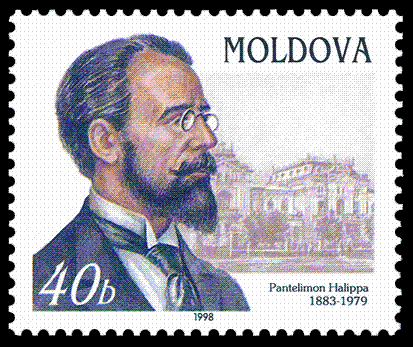
Pan Halippa and Sfatul Țării Palace

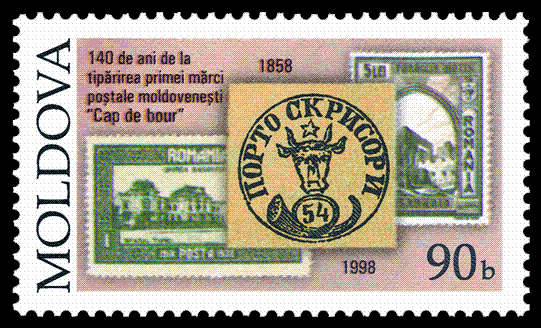
1998 stamp

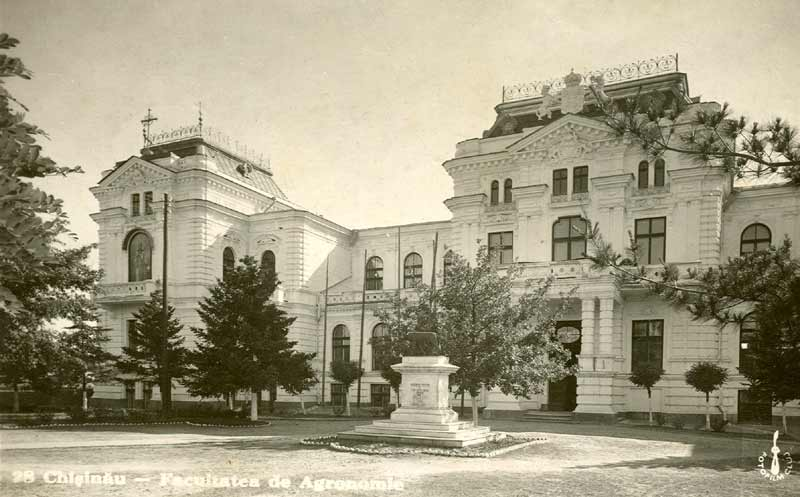
Capitoline Wolf and Sfatul Țării Palace

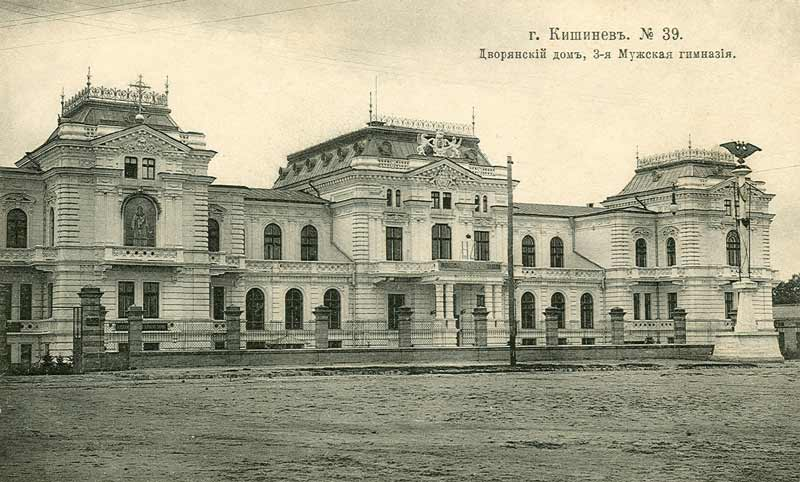

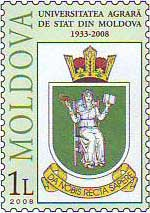
In the 1930s, it was a seat of the Agricultural State University of Moldova

== See also ==
- Capitoline Wolf, Chişinău
