= Constantin Mâțu =

Romanian journalist and lawyer

- Citizenship: Romania
- Occupation: Lawyer
- Organization(s): president of Journalists and Lawyers Association in Bessarabia
- Known for: his activity as a journalist

Constantin Mâțu was a Romanian journalist and lawyer from Chișinău, Bessarabia. He served as the president of Journalists and Lawyers Association in Bessarabia during the interwar period.

== Biography ==
He worked for the daily Cuvântul Nou (7 March – 1 August 1920), weekly Glasul Basarabiei (1921–1922, 1926–1927), weekly Cuvântul Basarabiei (August – September 1923), Viitorul Nostru (1923), Basarabia Românească (1932).

Between 24 October and 17 November 1923, Constantin Mâțu and Ion Pelivan edited Gazeta Basarabiei, a weekly of the Romanian National Party.

He served as the president of Journalists and Lawyers Association in Bessarabia (Romanian: Asociația ziariștilor și avocaților din Basarabia) during the interwar period.

== Works ==
- Constantin Mâțu, O necesitate desconsiderată: Presa românească în Basarabia, Chișinău, Tip. Eparhială „Cartea Românească”, 1930, 30 p.
