= Sergiu Niță =

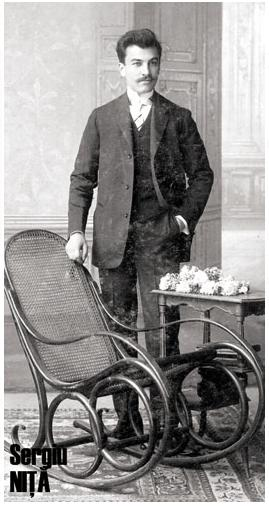
- Niță in 1930

Minister for Bessarabia
- In office 2 May 1920 – 17 December 1921
- Prime Minister: Alexandru Averescu
- Preceded by: Ion Inculeț
- Succeeded by: Dumitru Bogos
- In office 30 March 1926 – 3 June 1927
- Prime Minister: Alexandru Averescu
- Preceded by: Ion Inculeț

Personal details
- Born: 1883 Peresecina, Bessarabia Governorate
- Died: 3 March 1940 (aged 56–57) Bucharest, Kingdom of Romania
- Resting place: Chișinău
- Party: People's Party; Bessarabian Peasants' Party
- Spouse: Florica Niță
- Education: University of Iași
- Occupation: Lawyer
- Awards: Order of the Star of Romania, Officer rank Order of the Crown (Romania), Officer rank

Sergiu Niță (1883 – 3 March 1940) was a politician and lawyer from Romania. He served as Minister for Bessarabia (1920–1921, 1926–1927) in the Averescu cabinets.

== Biography ==
Sergiu Niță was born on March 21 (March 9 according to the old style) in 1883 in the Bessarabian village Peresecina (now Orhei District of the Republic of Moldova) into the family of a priest, Fyodor Niță, the rector of St. Michael's Church in the village of Peresecina.

After a while, the family moved to Chișinău.

=== Education ===
Sergiu Niță studied in Chișinău. Father Fyodor Niță, a graduate of the Chișinău Theological Seminary, was a friend with the Moldavian writer Constantin Stere, who convinced him to send his son Sergiu to study at the Law Faculty of the University of Iași.

== Career ==
Sergiu Niță became president of the Administrative Court of Chișinău. After the Union of Bessarabia with Romania, Niță served as member of the Parliament of Romania and Minister for Bessarabia in the Government of Alexandru Averescu (2 May 1920 - 17 December 1921 and 20 March 1926 - 3 June 1927). As minister for Bessarabia, he was the head of the initiative group who established the first Romanian language theater in Chișinău, on 10 October 1920.

He was a leader of the Bessarabian Peasants' Party. Internal divisions caused the party to split, with one group led by Niță joining the People's League in April 1920.

In 1925, during a visit to Chișinău, King Ferdinand I of Romania stopped at the residence of Niță (the second house on Sergei Lazo Street from Ștefan cel Mare Boulevard).

== Death ==
Niță died on 3 March 1940 in Bucharest; he was buried in the Central (Armenian) cemetery in Chișinău.

== Awards ==
- Order of the Star of Romania, Officer rank.
- Order of the Crown of Romania, Officer rank.
- Order of Ferdinand I, Commander rank.
