= Onisifor Ghibu =

Romanian academic and politician (1883–1972)

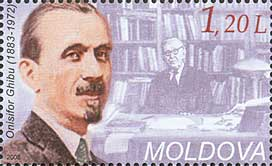
- Born: May 31, 1883; Szelistye, Austria-Hungary
- Died: October 3, 1972 (aged 89); Sibiu, Socialist Republic of Romania
- Resting place: Municipal Cemetery, Sibiu
- Education: University of Bucharest; Eötvös Loránd University; University of Jena
- Occupations: Academic, educator
- Employer: Babeș-Bolyai University
- Spouse: Veturia Ghibu (m. 1911; died 1959)
- Website: onisiforghibu.ro

Onisifor Ghibu (May 31, 1883 – October 3, 1972) was a Romanian teacher of pedagogy, member of the Romanian Academy, and politician.

== Biography ==
=== Early life ===
Born into a peasant family in Szelistye (now Săliște, Romania), near Nagyszeben (now Sibiu), in Transylvania, Kingdom of Hungary, then part of Austria-Hungary. He attended the Hungarian language high school in Nagyszeben and then the Romanian language gymnasium in Brassó (now Brașov). Afterwards, he continued his studies at the Romanian Orthodox Seminary in Nagyszeben, where he received stipends for study at the University of Bucharest and the Eötvös Loránd University of Budapest. He also studied in Strasbourg and received his doctorate in Philosophy and Pedagogy from the University of Jena in 1909. Two years later, he married Veturia Nicolau (1889–1956), a lieder singer from Bucharest, who would follow him to Sibiu.

=== World War I and interwar ===
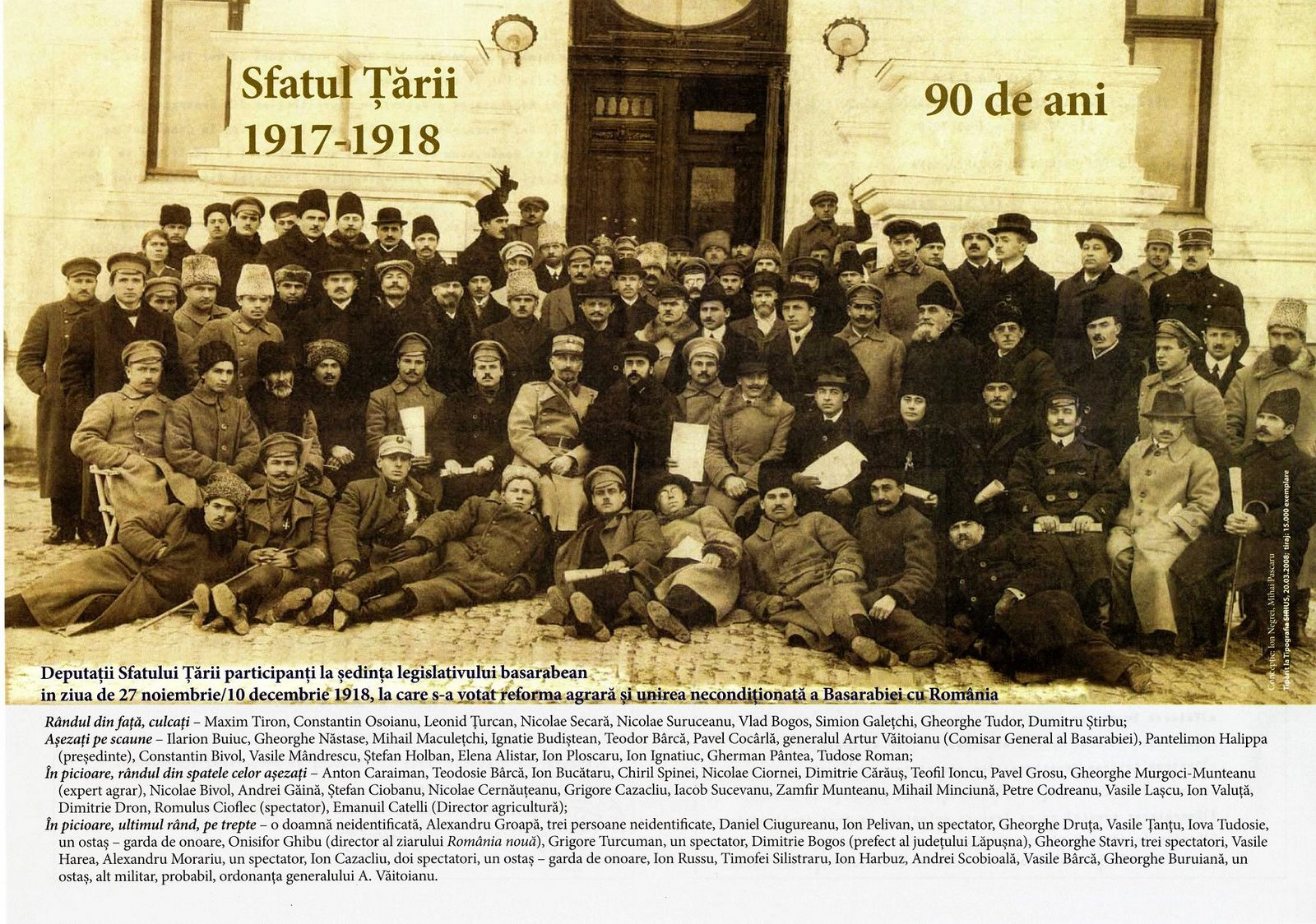
Sfatul Țării Palace, December 10, 1918

In 1914, after the outbreak of World War I, Ghibu fled to the Old Kingdom and, after Romania joined the Entente side in 1916, the Hungarian Military Tribunal in Kolozsvár (today Cluj-Napoca, Romania) sentenced him to death in absentia for desertion.

In December 1916, after the occupation of Bucharest by the Central Powers, he and his family took refuge at Iași. In March 1917, he moved to Bessarabia, which was part of the Russian Empire after 1812 (before 1812 it was part of Moldavia).

Throughout the Romanian Campaign and the Russian Revolution of 1917, Ghibu was active in the national Romanian movement which eventually led to the creation of a Moldavian Democratic Republic, which joined Greater Romania in 1918.

From 1919 to 1940, he was a professor at Dacia Superior University, later renamed King Ferdinand I University, in Cluj (now Babeș-Bolyai University), which he helped set up, together with Sextil Pușcariu. Ghibu also organized the educational system for all education levels, in the Romanian language, first in Bessarabia starting in 1917 (where since 1867 the Romanian language education had been abolished in all public schools) and in Transylvania starting in 1919. He was elected corresponding member of the Romanian Academy in 1919.

=== Life under communism ===
Upon the close of World War II, with the outbreak of Soviet occupation, Ghibu was arrested on March 22, 1945, for anti-Soviet activity, and subsequently imprisoned in the internment camp at Caracal, where he spent 222 days. His account of the experience, "Prison Journal: Caracal 1945" is unique as the only one written in the Romanian communist prison system and not after, due to the comparatively relaxed conditions in camps at the time. Nevertheless, the seeds of future draconian measures were already planted: the camp authorities made it clear that the purpose of the internment was to "re-educate the bourgeoisie".

After the establishment of the communist regime in Romania, he was again arrested on December 10, 1956, and sentenced to 5 years in prison for organizing a rally of students at the seminary, which was inspired by the Hungarian Revolution and deemed an "action against the democratic people's regime of the People's Republic of Romania". Incarcerated successively in the prisons of Văcărești, Sibiu, and Făgăraș, he was released after 2 years, on January 13, 1958. He continued to write, leaving behind tens of thousands of pages of manuscripts, mostly memoirs.

He died in Sibiu on October 31, 1972, and was buried in the city's Municipal Cemetery. High schools in Chișinău, Cluj-Napoca, Oradea, Orhei, and Sibiu, as well as streets in Bucharest, Chișinău, Cluj-Napoca, Oradea, and Sibiu bear his name.
