= Academy of Music, Theatre and Fine Arts =

Public university in Chișinău, Moldova

Coordinates: 47.0225°N 28.8175°E

- Academia de Muzică, Teatru și Arte Plastice
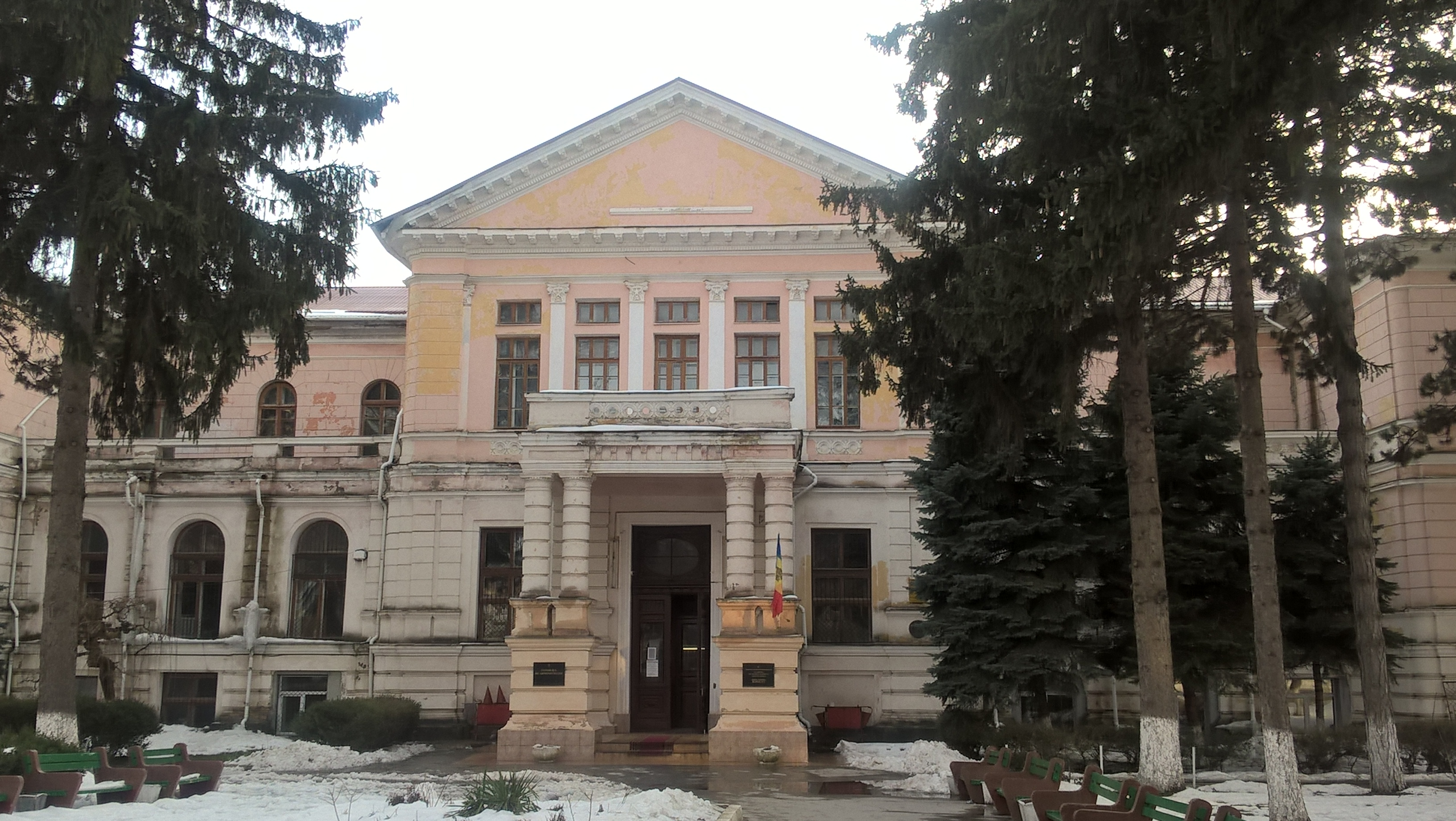
- Established: 1919/1940
- Rector: Victoria Melnic
- Dean: Tatiana Berezovicova
- Location: Chisinau, Moldova
- Website: www.amtap.md
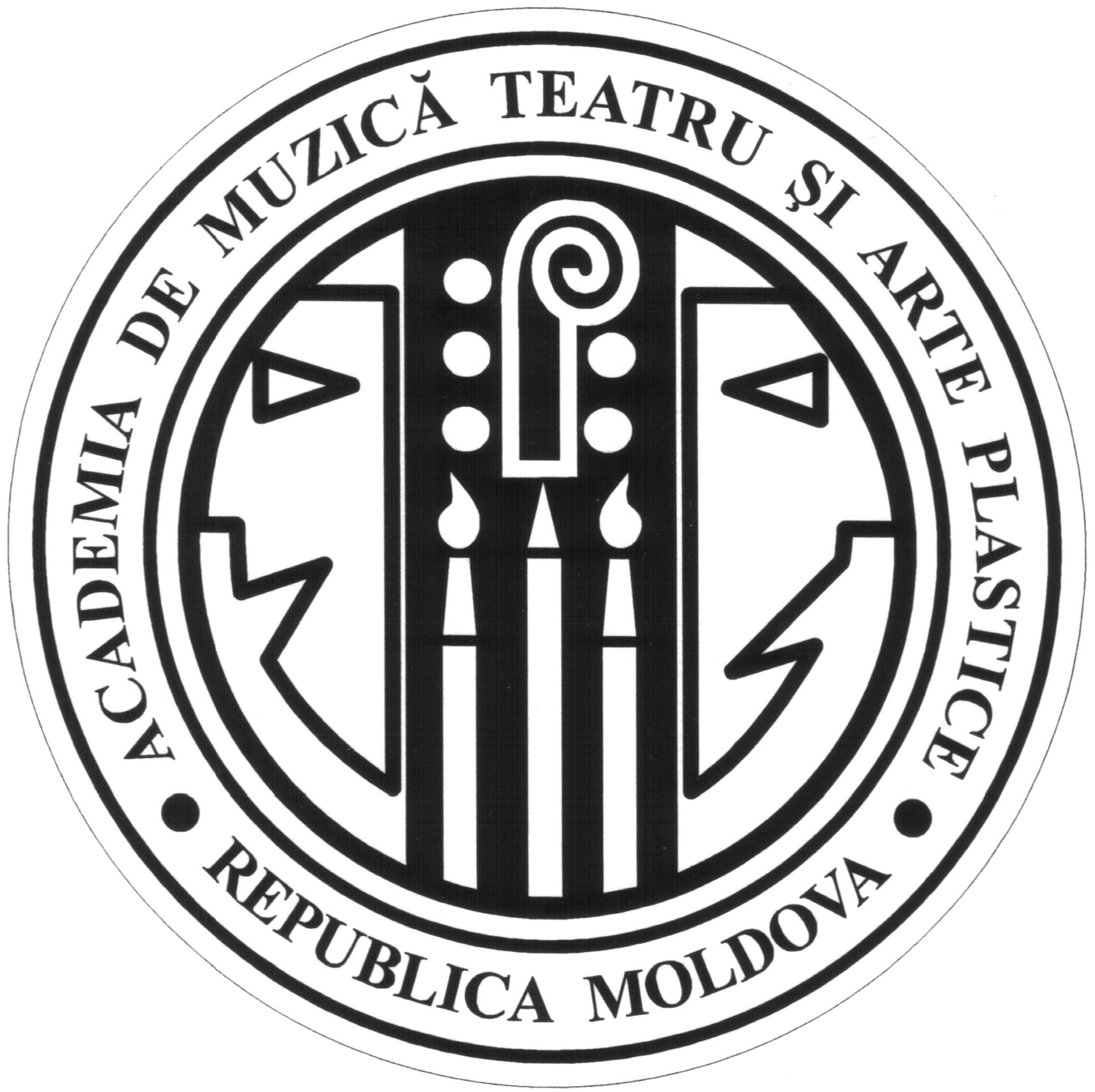

The Academy of Music, Theatre and Fine Arts (Romanian: Academia de Muzică, Teatru și Arte Plastice, AMTAP) is a public university in Chișinău, the capital of Moldova.

== History ==
The institution is the successor of the Chișinău State Conservatory founded in 1940 and of the musical education institutions that have been operating in Chișinău since 1919, when the Unirea Conservatory was founded at the initiative of Romanian composer George Enescu.

At the end of the 1950s, the first groups of students in the acting specialty were enrolled. In 1965, already within the State Institute of Arts (formed on the basis of the Conservatory in 1964), the Directing and Acting department was created, and the Faculty of Theatre Arts was created in 1988. The Faculty of Fine Arts was founded in 1984. In its current form, AMTAP was established on the basis of the reorganization of the State University of Arts (established by merging the Academy of Music G. Musicescu and the State Institute of Arts in 1999) on September 1, 2002.

== Academics ==
The AMTAP trains specialists in the following fields:

- Fine Arts
- Culturology
- Design
- Multimedia
- Music
- Theatre

== Faculties ==
- Musical Arts
- Theatrical Arts, Choreography and Multimedia
- Fine Arts, Decorative Arts and Design
