= Glasul Basarabiei =

Newspaper

- Founder: Grigore Constantinescu
- Editor-in-chief: Grigore D. Constantinescu
- Founded: 1913
- Language: Romanian
- Headquarters: Chişinău

Glasul Basarabiei (English: The Voice of Bessarabia) was a newspaper from Chişinău, Bessarabia, founded by Grigore Constantinescu in 1913.

== Bibliography ==
- Almanahul dicţionar al presei din România şi a celei româneşti de pretutindeni de G. Caliga. – București, 1926. – P. 155.
