= Simeon G. Murafa =

Bessarabian politician and opera singer (1887–1917)

Simeon Gheorghevici Murafa
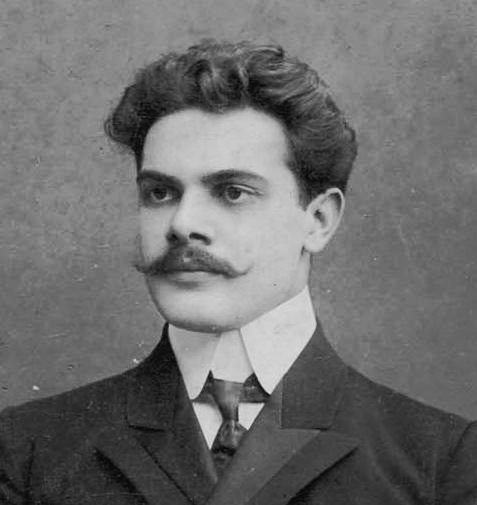
- Murafa in Kyiv, photograph by Dmitry Markov (June 8, 1907)
- Born: May 24, 1887; Cotiujenii Mari
- Died: August 20, 1917 (aged 30); Chișinău
- Education: Saint Vladimir (Shevchenko) University
- Occupations: Activist, composer, journalist
- Political party: Moldavian National Party
- Spouse: Polina Murafa
- Children: Silvia Murafa

Simeon Gheorghevici Murafa (also spelled Simion or Semion Murafa; May 24, 1887 – August 20, 1917) was a Bessarabian politician in the Russian Empire, also known as a publicist and composer. A trained classical singer and a graduate of Saint Vladimir (Shevchenko) University, he was one of the leading activists supporting ethnic Romanian emancipation in Bessarabia and beyond. By 1914, he associated with the revolutionary core of the Romanian nationalist movement, which he represented as director of Cuvânt Moldovenesc newspaper.

An officer of the Imperial Russian Army during World War I, Murafa mainly used his position to advance Romanian nationalism. In early 1917, he helped establish the Moldavian National Party, helping to organize its cells in Bessarabia and Odessa. He was murdered while attending a friend's party, after a group of revolutionary soldiers identified him as a political enemy. His legacy is honored in both Romania and Moldova.

== Biography ==
=== Early activities ===
A native of Cotiujenii Mari, at the time part of Russia's Bessarabia Governorate, Simeon G. Murafa was from a family of Moldavian yeomen. He was the nephew of another nationalist activist, the Bessarabian Orthodox priest Andrei Murafa. From an early age, like his uncle, he closely identified with Bessarabia's ethnic Romanian community and its national emancipation ideals. According to Gheorghe V. Madan, his friend and fellow activist, Murafa was "a fiery nationalist". An outstanding choir boy, young Murafa went to the Orthodox seminary in Edineț, graduating in 1903. He was then sent to Kyiv, where he graduated from Lyceum No. 2 in 1907, simultaneously enlisting at Kyiv Conservatory (to 1910) and the University Law School (to 1912).

Murafa was originally involved with Ion Pelivan's Romanian national club and library, mentioned in Bălți in or around 1908. In 1908 or 1909, Murafa, Madan, Ștefan Ciobanu and Daniel Ciugureanu established Deșteptarea ("Awakening") or Pământenia ("The Colony"), a Bessarabian Romanian students' circle in Kyiv. At Deșteptarea, Murafa was sought after for his melodious voice, which he gave an aesthetic quality to the nationalist manifesto. He organized benefit concerts, and put to music the patriotic poetry of Alexei Mateevici. As noted by the nationalist doyen Pan Halippa, Murafa was fast becoming "the tireless propagandist of the national and popular cause." Reputedly, after decades of Russification, Murafa was one of the select few Besarabian intellectuals who could decently express themselves in the Romanian vernacular, which was better preserved by the mass of the people.

The group established direct but clandestine links with the Kingdom of Romania (which they regarded as their mother country), and circulated Romanian-language books. Deșteptarea men protested against Russification with letters sent to Nikolay Chkheidze and other Imperial Duma deputies. They remained in contact with Pelivan, who was being kept under close surveillance by Russian authorities. In 1912, the Gendarmes intercepted Pelivan's letter to Murafa, Mateevici and Ciugureanu, in which Pelivan advised them not to seek integration into the Russian bureaucracy. Russia, Pelivan advised, was "the enemy".

=== Cuvânt Moldovenesc and World War service ===
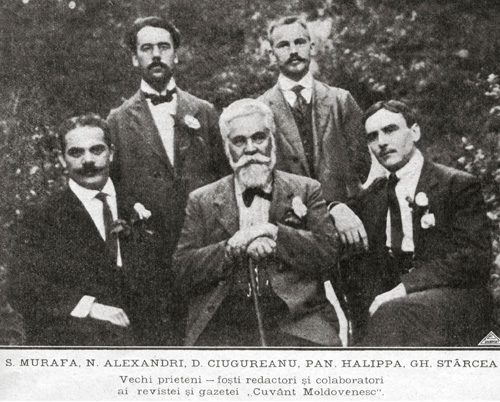
The staff of Cuvânt Moldovenesc in 1913. Clockwise, from bottom left: Murafa, Pan Halippa, Gheorghe Stârcea, Daniel Ciugureanu, Nicolae Alexandri

In May 1913, sponsored by the landowner Vasile Stroescu, Nicolae Alexandri and Murafa set up Cuvânt Moldovenesc, a nationalist newspaper. In its opening manifesto, the newspaper depicted Bessarabia as engulfed by "the darkness of ignorance", taking over the intellectual mission of enlightening the Romanian-speaking masses; the first issue also featured Murafa's educational essay, Cine-s moldovenii? ("Who Are the Moldavians?"). From 1914, taking over from Alexandri, Murafa became the Cuvânt Moldovenesc director. His arrival followed a rift between the revolutionary mainstream of Romanian nationalism in Bessarabia and Alexandri's vague Tolstoyism. Murafa made a mark of his leadership by publishing, for the first time ever, Mateevici's patriotic poem, Limba noastră. He continued to organize charity concerts, in which he occasionally sang as a baritone.

Murafa's nationalist cause was enticed by the events of World War I, during which he served, with the rank of Major, in both the Imperial Russian Army and the Russian Red Cross, commanding a Sanitary Detachment. In autumn 1916, when the Romanian Kingdom joined Russia and the other Entente Powers, Murafa and his Detachment were sent on the Romanian Front. Particularly after the February Revolution in Russia, he used this position to agitate among the Bessarabian soldiers, supporting a Bessarabian-Romanian union.

At Fălticeni, Murafa had an encounter with Romanian soldier-novelist Mihail Sadoveanu, with whom he discussed the cause of Bessarabian Romanians. According to Sadoveanu's memoirs, Murafa, "that strong and lively 'Moskal' with sparkling eyes", believed that Romanian-language books were the "seed" and "gospel" of a patriotic awakening; hence, he encouraged his subordinates to smuggle as many books as they could from Romania to Russia. Halippa describes him as "the liaison between us and Romania".

In March 1917, Murafa was again in Bessarabia, and in contact with the Romanian opinion-maker, Onisifor Ghibu, who had escaped from Transylvania. Another Transylvanian, Romulus Cioflec, joined him in editing Cuvânt Moldovenesc. With Ghibu, he is mentioned among the founders of the Moldavian National Party (PNM). As noted by historian Charles Upson Clark, the PNM demanded home rule with a Moldavian Legislative Assembly, the definitive end of Russification, and generally "a firm foundation for the civic and national liberties gained by the Revolution."

He joined Ghibu's Romanian National Committee in Chișinău, but continued to agitate among the Romanian soldiers in Russian ranks. The Committee sent him back on the Romanian Front, where he championed the emancipation cause among Bessarabians from the Turkestan Volunteer units. At a Committee meeting in April, Murafa noted: "Our Moldavians [that is, Bessarabians] have always been first to engage in fighting for Russian revolutionary ideas. But now it has come to pass that we should be fighting for our very own Moldavian interests. [...] For far too long have we been Russians, let's be Moldavians for a change!" During those months, the local Zemstvo republished, in Cyrillic type, Murafa's Cine-s moldovenii?.

Together with Mateevici, he was an official delegate to the Schoolteachers' Congresses, which introduced the Romanian alphabet to Bessarabian schools. In April, attended the PNM's "Great National Assembly" of Bessarabian soldiers in Odessa, and, in June, greeted the Romanian Volunteer Corps at Chișinău Railway Station. However, Murafa also had a stint in the eclectic "Romanian Nationalist-Revolutionary Party", founded by the anarchist Ilie Cătărău around a platform supporting a "Free Russia" and a "Greater Romania". To Romanian nationalists such as Ghibu, this group appeared suspicious, but Murafa was considered a mere victim of Cătărău's machinations.

=== Murder ===
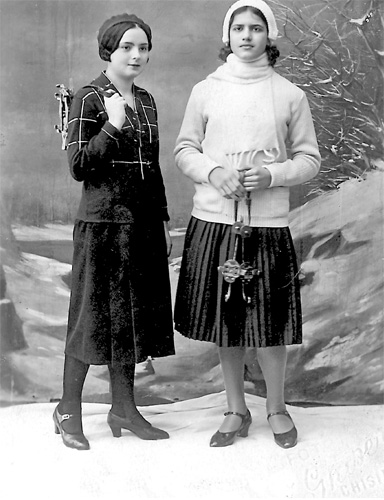
Murafa's daughter Silvia (right) with Mateevici's daughter Nina at a skating rink in Chișinău, 1932

On August 20, 1917, Simeon G. Murafa was attending a picnic at the Chișinău vineyard owned by engineer Andrei Constantin Hodorogea, when a mob of soldiers, which Halippa would later claim were Bolsheviks, stormed in. They identified the owner and guests as "counterrevolutionary" politicians, and surrounded them menacingly. According to one account, a shooting ensued, probably after Hodorogea asked his aggressors to stop tearing out grapes and littering. Murafa was hit in the chest, and the attackers used their bayonets to kill Hodorogea, who was trying to offer him medical attention. Another eyewitness account states places notes that Murafa and Hodorogea were murdered at bayonet by "three well-armed Russian soldiers", after having made efforts to appease them.

Both were dead before the local Militsiya could intervene. The incident, retold in detail by Cioflec (who was present but escaped unharmed), shocked Bessarabian intellectuals. Murafa was survived by his wife, Polina Murafa, and an infant daughter, Silvia.

The murders, it was later noted, were part of a violent backlash that marked a definitive split between Bessarabian activists and the far left. Halippa, who narrowly missed attending Hodorogea's picnic, calls this a time of "full-blown anarchy". Clark additionally notes that this killing of two "most conspicuous Moldavian leaders" was linked with the devastation of farms and businesses by peasants and Russian deserters, but also with a Bolshevik "campaign of terrorism". Murafa and Hodorogea's death occurred just days after Mateevici's death from typhus, which led the public to associate the three men and commemorated them together.

Following the December 1917 establishment of a breakaway Moldavian Democratic Republic, which eventually united with Romania, Murafa was openly designated a hero to the cause of unionism. In May 1918, before its complete merger with Romania, the Republic set aside 5,000 rubles for a monument to be dedicated at Murafa's grave, a further 3,000 as aid for his widow, and a 900-ruble pension for his daughter. The issue was hotly debated between the PNM and the left-leaning Peasants' Faction, but passed with a slim majority of votes. In 1922, following Halippa's pleas, the Romanian authorities commissioned a statue to honor all three activists. As a result, the Murafa—Mateevici—Hodorogea Monument, a stone-and-bronze work by Vasile Ionescu-Varo, was erected in Chișinău. Bessarabian activists of that period introduced Murafa as the original "martyr of the nation". The term was notably used by Pelivan, and also on the monument's dedication.

Murafa's legacy was again challenged by the Soviet Union's 1940 occupation of Bessarabia: the monument was taken down and evicted to Romania; it is presumed lost. Following Bessarabia's 1991 emancipation as the independent state of Moldova, a commemorative plaque was unveiled on the same spot. According to 2013 reports, a replica of the original monument was to be erected there, on the initiative of politician Dumitru Godoroja (one of Hodorogea's descendants). The project was halted when it met opposition from Moldova's Party of Communists.
