= Vasile Stroescu =

Bessarabian Romanian politician, landowner, and philanthropist (1845–1926)

Vasile Vasilievici Stroescu Vasily Vasilyevich Stroesko Vasile de Stroesco Basile Stroesco
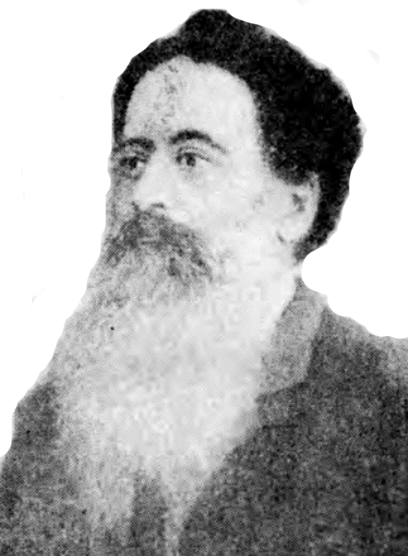
- Photograph of Stroescu, ca. 1900

Member of the Chamber of Deputies of Romania
- In office 1919–1920
- Constituency: Orhei County

Member of the Senate of Romania
- In office January 3, 1924 – April 13, 1926
- Constituency: Reghin

Personal details
- Born: November 11, 1845 Trinca, Bessarabia Governorate, Russian Empire
- Died: April 13, 1926 (aged 80) Bucharest, Kingdom of Romania
- Resting place: Sfânta Vineri Cemetery, Bucharest
- Party: Bessarabian Peasants' Party
- Other political affiliations: National Moldavian Party
- Education: Imperial Novorossiya University; Moscow State University; Saint Petersburg State University; University of Berlin
- Profession: Landowner, judge, agriculturist, philanthropist, activist

Vasile Vasilievici Stroescu (Russian: Василий Васильевич Строеско, Vasily Vasilyevich Stroesko; November 11, 1845 – April 13, 1926), also known as Vasile de Stroesco, Basile Stroesco, or Vasile Stroiescu, was a Bessarabian and Romanian politician, landowner, and philanthropist. One of the proponents and sponsors of Romanian nationalism in Russia's Bessarabia Governorate, as well as among the Romanian communities of Austria-Hungary, he was also a champion of self-help and of cooperative farming. He inherited or purchased large estates, progressively dividing them among local peasants, while setting up local schools and churches for their use. An erudite and traveler, he abandoned his career in law to focus on his agricultural projects and cultural activism. For the latter work, he became an honorary member of the Romanian Academy.

Having backed the nationalist papers Basarabia and Cuvânt Moldovenesc, Stroescu was drawn into the more elitist cell of the nationalist movement, centered on the parts of the zemstva and gentry assembly. He was thus honorary president of the National Moldavian Party shortly after the February Revolution but, with Vladimir Herța, drifted away from the core of the movement to set up his own aristocratic branch. He became an absentee member of Sfatul Țării during the existence of a Moldavian Democratic Republic and its union with Romania. In 1919–1920, he served in the Assembly of Deputies, and was its de facto President for one day, on November 20, 1919. Rallying with the Bessarabian Peasants' Party, Stroescu became critical of the unification process, decrying government abuses in Bessarabia, and also objected to the 1920s land reform. At the age of eighty, he was elected to the Senate of Romania with backing from the Romanian National Party; he died shortly after in Bucharest, after a brief battle with bronchitis, and was granted a state funeral.

== Biography ==
=== Beginnings ===
The Stroescus were a family of ethnic Romanian aristocrats and shepherds from Moldavia: the family patriarch Ioan Stroescu had the Moldavian boyar title of jitnicer in the late 17th century. His grandson, Gavriil, was a șătrar; Ienache, Gavriil's son, reverted to pastoralism, and owned ranches in Iași County. His own two sons Vasile (1795–1875) and Ioan moved between Moldavia and Bessarabia, which, following the 1812 Treaty of Bucharest, had been absorbed into the Russian Empire. Vasile owned ten estates on either side of the border, split between Iași and Hotin counties. The Stroescus were all inducted into Russian nobility in 1828 and granted arms in 1867. From his marriage to Profira Manoil Guțu (1808–1856), Vasile Sr had many children, of whom Vasile Jr was the fifteenth. Their progeny included two other surviving sons—Mihail (1836–1889) and Gheorghe (1840–1922). The couple also had four daughters, married off to aristocrats of Russian, Greek, or Polish Bessarabian descent: Ana Kazimir, Maria Druganov, Elena Martos, and Ecaterina Șumanski. The latter's husband was Clemente Șumanski, Mayor of Kishinev in the 1870s.

The most detailed accounts report that Vasile Jr was born on November 11, 1845, in Trinca, a Hotin County village (now in Edineț District, Moldova); some of the earlier sources gave his birth year as 1844, and his birth place as the family manor of Stolniceni. Young Stroescu was taught reading and writing by his mother and sisters—he studied the Psalter, written in standardized Romanian, which, as he recalled in 1920, only differed slightly from the Moldavian dialect he spoke at home (for instance, by using zăpadă for the Moldavian omăt, or "snow"). He then read up on lay Romanian literature, being especially enthusiastic about Moldavian contributors such as Vasile Alecsandri and Ion Creangă, in whom he identified the primordial wisdom of peasants. In his later activity as a cultural sponsor, he prioritized editions from both authors. Stroescu attended the Bessarabian Lyceum of Kishinev, then the school of Kamenets-Podolskiy and Odessa's Richelieu Lyceum. His training here was in Russian, which he had never spoken before: "I struggled a lot until I got to pick up this and than word." In a 1920 interview, he declared his enduring love of Russian literature, recommending in particular Gogol, Tolstoy, and Ivan Turgenev. He argued that, of all the Westerners he had ever read, only Maupassant could come close to this triad. Also in 1920, he confessed that his training was not completed in Odessa, but rather at a gymnasium in Saint Petersburg; it was afterwards that he returned to the Richelieu school, which had become the Imperial Novorossiya University. It was there that he took his law degree.

Later on, Stroescu furthered his training at the universities of Moscow, Saint Petersburg, and Berlin. Though it is known that the latter institution awarded him a doctorate of law, he remained unusually discreet about his youth, his studies, and their exact dating (in one rare exception to this rule, he informed his friends that he had been lodging in Berlin during 1866). An erudite, he reportedly spoke all Slavic languages, German, French, English and Italian, in addition to his native Romanian. Upon graduation, he traveled throughout Europe, including in the Kingdom of Romania, and also visited the Western colonies in Africa. In addition to championing the Romanian cause, he was enamored with South America; he went as far south as Chile, and wanted to cross the Pacific into Australia—though he never managed to visit that continent. This passion for traveling was shared by his older brother Mihail. A schoolmate of the celebrated writer Bogdan Petriceicu Hasdeu and a veteran of the Crimean War, he was once shipwrecked in the Pacific, and wrote memoirs of his adventures.

Vasile was appointed a judge at the Hotin city tribunal in 1867, becoming colleagues with Hasdeu's father, Alexandru Hâjdeu. A memoir by the Romanian Ștefan Dan reports that, in 1869, Stroescu was already active in Romanian nationalist circles, and sabotaging cultural Russification. According to this account, he took under his care the fellow landowner Matei Donici, who was in danger of losing his proficiency in Romanian, and made him relearn the language. Following his father's death, Stroescu withdrew from the legal profession altogether, making Brînzeni his main residence. There, he began his trade as a gentleman farmer, peasant educator, and amateur agronomist, while maintaining a lively interest in historical research. After receiving his inheritance, Stroescu owned 9,000 hectares (22,000 acres), but later came to purchase 16,000 more hectares (some 4,000 acres) of land, with several manors, ranches, and stables, making him one of the richest people in the region. He reportedly drove herds of cattle across several countries, selling them in Vienna at a great profit.

Many of his properties he auctioned off, using the money to finance his philanthropy, or divided between the peasant obshchiny, with Stroescu as a pioneer of cooperative farming and cooperative forestry. He personally verified his plowmen's techniques and corrected their mistakes. As noted by Brînzeni native Ion Buzdugan, he was "modest and balanced", but also "ruthless with those who squandered his wealth." As a child, Buzdugan met Stroescu, later describing him as an "altar of diligence and kindness", and commending him for his efforts in preserving Romanian folklore. Fellow activist Pan Halippa noted that Stroescu was a "real democrat" and "true Christian", who "never married and lived modestly." "This man", Halippa claims, "used his great managerial competence to please those living on his estate. He [...] helped everyone own a proper home grange, acting as a statesman ought to. [...] If only those ministers who call themselves democrats and socialists could know how the great Bessarabian Romanian Vasile Stroescu used to live!" By 1918, Stroescu only had some 8,000 hectares left to his name, spread about between Trinca, Bădragii Vechi, Druța and Zăbriceni.

=== Nationalist sponsor ===
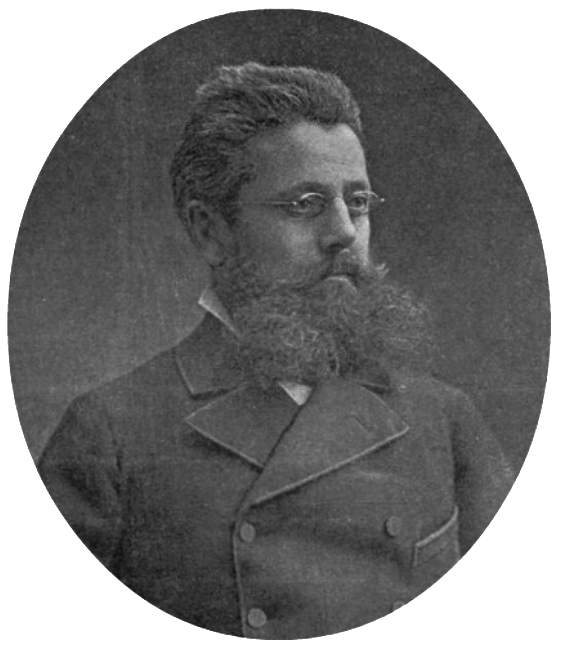
Stroescu's brother (and fellow philanthropist) Mihail Vasilievici

As noted by historian Iurie Colesnic, Stroescu and Nicolae Ștefan Casso stood among those boyars who reverted Russification or Moldovenism, "neutralizing the influence" of pro-imperial adversaries such as Alexander N. Krupensky. Stroescu built of refurbished several schools in Bessarabia, founded hospitals in his native village and in Brătușeni, and became ktitor of Bessarabian Orthodox churches in Trinca, Pociumbăuți, Șofrîncani, and Zăicani. In 1899, he offered to sponsor state schools, ran through the zemstvo network—provided that they be allowed to teach classes in Romanian. This proposal was simply disregarded by government. With the liberalization made possible by the Revolution of 1905, Stroescu began participating in conspiratorial meetings of the Romanian elite in Kishinev, exchanging ideas with Halippa, Nicolae Alexandri, Ion Inculeț, Nicolae Bivol, Alexis Nour, Ion Pelivan, and Paul Gore, where they first discussed the prospect of Romania and Bessarabia uniting. As Pelivan notes, he and Emanuil Gavriliță tried to persuade Stroescu to finance a magazine for the Romanian-speaking populace, but the landowner "seemed rather skeptical". However, in 1906 he sponsored Halippa in setting up a democratic-and-nationalist newspaper, Basarabia, eventually shut down by the Russian authorities in March 1907.

By 1910, Stroescu had expatriated himself to Switzerland, and was living in Davos Platz. As Buzdugan reports, he had been driven out by the later echoes of the 1905 movement, which had rekindled Russian nationalism (and as such had brought on renewed repression against Romanian activists); also according to Buzdugan, Stroescu never again visited Brînzeni, and instead left one of his peasant employees as caretaker of his estates. His charity work continued to have a profound effect among the Romanian communities of Transylvania, in Austria-Hungary, where Stroescu notably founded the boarding house serving the Diocese of Arad, as well as "tens of churches, schools and hospitals". Although a patron of Romanian Orthodoxy, he was critical of the church's claim to have preserved Romanian identity, noting that its nationalist discourse was a recent "invention of the parsons, to emphasize their own merits". He saw Orthodoxy as equal to its rival Romanian Greek-Catholic Church, arguing that "a religious difference cannot divide us", since "Romanians of both religions behave one to the other as true Christians and therefore as brethren". As such, in 1910 Stroescu allied himself with the Greek Catholics to tackle the effects of Magyarization, donating 100,000 Kronen to the cultural fund in Blaj.

As recounted by the politician and period witness Petru Groza, Stroescu was a man of "puerile innocence", who began sending sizable donations to every Transylvanian peasant who wrote to him about personal misfortunes. Some estimates suggest that his sponsorship of schools, including Orthodox ones, ran at 950,000 Kronen in 1913–500,000 of these were channeled through Partenie Cosma, and 200,000 more through the Archbishopric of Sibiu, while 100,000 went to the creation of a girls' school in Arad. His contribution also included a Stroescu Fund at ASTRA Society and various payments to the Cultural League for the Unity of All Romanians. In Romanian-ruled Western Moldavia, he fitted primary schools from a special fund, which ran at 200,000 lei, and, in 1906–1908, put up 300,000 lei for the building of a Romanian People's Salvation Cathedral. As noted by his friend, the physician and political activist Nicolae L. Lupu, while revered by some of Moldavia's villagers, he remained largely unknown in the "old kingdom"; this allowed him to attend sessions of the Romanian Parliament and hear speeches by Romania's political leaders, without them recognizing him.

In May 1910, as recognition of his activities, and in particular for his work with the Blaj foundations, Stroescu was elected an honorary member of the Romanian Academy. This appointment left him indifferent, as he considered his deeds "only natural". He declared himself "at my country's disposal, with all this mind God gave me, from all my heart and with my entire wealth". According to Halippa and Pelivan, his focus fell on Transylvania and elsewhere only because censorship and repression prevented him from openly financing nationalism in his native province. Another account is that he was felt called into action by the anti-Magyarization writings of Ioan Slavici. Moreover, his philanthropic activity was preceded by that of his late brother Mihail, who, as early as 1882, had set up ten model schools in Romania-proper, after having failed to create a Romanian studies department at Novorossiya University. Also noted for founding a school in Stolniceni, Mihail had set up a rural hospital at Bekir, eventually splitting his wealth between ASTRA, the Romanian vocational schools of Brașov, and his tenant farmers.

The family's renewed contributions have led various authors to refer to Vasile as Transylvania or Bessarabia's "Maecenas". Transylvanians such as Justinian Teculescu dedicated him verse of praise; others believed that he was not a real man, but a fictional character created by the Romanian state to hide its direct involvement in Austro-Hungarian affairs (or, alternatively, by the Tsarist autocracy, so as to "deceive the Romanians"). Stroescu also sponsored individual Bessarabians to pursue their education abroad, as he did with physician and fellow Romanian nationalist Elena Alistar, and founded an eponymous Stroescu Help Club for the Romanian Americans of Cleveland. Between June 1910 and August 1911, he paid for Nour to publish a Russian-language paper, Bessarabets, and, after 1913, financed the newspaper Cuvânt Moldovenesc, published by Halippa and Alexandri, also helping peasants with their subscriptions.

By 1912, Stroescu was living in Lausanne, but still appeared incognito to celebrate the golden jubilee of Petru Maior Society in Budapest. Though he agreed to sponsor this club, he reportedly expressed derision for the students' claim that they were living in squalor, and also concluded that the Romanians in Hungary-proper were anything but repressed. Stroescu was by then also expressing his disenchantment with his Transylvanian colleagues—as summarized by Nour, he "ran across some of the Romanian 'psychologies', and was disappointed by them." His letters to his fund's beneficiaries often included "drastic reprimands." In November 1910, he addressed an open letter to the Transylvanian leader Octavian Goga, which noted that the Romanian students at Franz Joseph University had proven incapable of either forming their own union or of publicizing calls for material support in the local press. In mid-1912, the newspaper Românul of Arad hosted Stroescu's admonishment of political and economic affairs in Romania-proper. In these passages (criticized in turn by the Romanian D. Nanu), Stroescu mocked Romania as incapable of providing support to Romanian communities outside its borders—formed of sharecroppers and state bureaucrats, its society could not produce a budgetary surplus, and therefore could not match his own philanthropy.

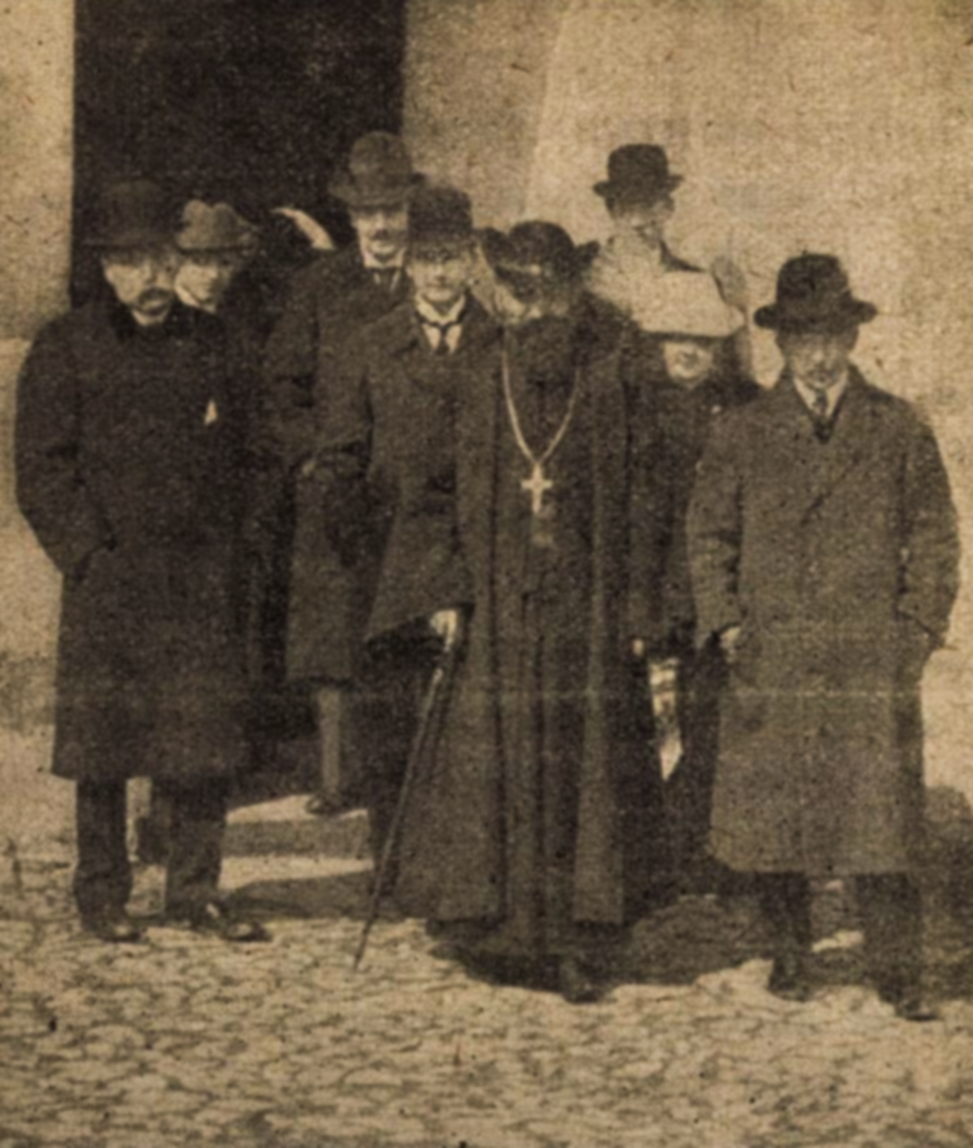
Miron Cristea, as the Bishop of Caransebeș, flanked by Stroescu (left) and Octavian Goga. Taken during a children's exhibit in Rășinari on October 20, 1912

In Romania itself, Stroescu was defended by Dumitru Karnabatt, who argued that his accusations were honest and correct. As noted by Karnabatt, Stroescu also validated a critique stated earlier by Slavici, whom the Transylvanians had immediately shunned. Stroescu also began investigating the practices of Romanian Transylvanian banks, suggesting that they were dealing in predatory lending. He detailed this claim in Românul, criticizing the banks for paying dividends higher than 5%, and of their shareholders for accepting them; the difference, he argued, could have gone toward sponsoring culture. Responding to this "judicious and unusually categorical" critique, the economist Ion Mateiu suggested that the reduction demanded by Stroescu was needlessly abrupt. Stroescu, who donated 50,000 Kronen to settling disputes between ASTRA and the popular banks, and then to the creation of alternative credit unions, found sympathy with the writing team at Luceafărul, which basked in his critique of "our petty bourgeoisie [and] its plutocratic ideals". Through ASTRA, he also distributed his brochure Statutele și îndrumările pentru băncile poporale ("Statutes and Guiding for the People's Banks"). The Bihar County bankers objected to such initiatives, seeing Stroescu as an unfair competitor to their business.

=== Revolution and union ===
By 1914, Stroescu's relations with the Austro-Hungarian authorities were noticeably strained. His sponsoring of a Christmas 1913 folk party in Beiuș almost ended with the prosecution of its organizer, Nicolae Coroiu. Cosma was similarly being investigated for his deals with Stroescu, and only escaped harassment by fleeing into Romania. The outbreak of World War I caught Stroescu on the Russian side, ending all his work in Transylvania; the government of István Tisza listed him as a "public menace", suspected of wanting to incite a Romanian rebellion in Transylvania. He returned to Odessa in 1914, and managed to persuade the authorities to release his protégée Alistar, who had been arrested for sedition. Settling in Romania by early 1915, Alistar was formally accused by Corneliu Șumuleanu of having embezzled money sent in by Stroescu, from a fund set aside for Iași University students. She defended herself by publishing Stroescu's own letter, which had been sent out of Kishinev (where he was holidaying at the time); the document dismissed the allegations as "egregious".

In late 1916, Romania entered the war, siding with Russia against Austria-Hungary and the other Central Powers. Following the February Revolution, which inaugurated an episode of social rebellion and national emancipation throughout Russia, the Stroescus were targeted by Russian revolutionaries. Gheorghe's former manor in Bălceana was ransacked by Russian deserters from the Romanian Front, who burned down his manuscripts, and so were other country homes owned by the family. The Brînzeni estate was spared: the peasants there, having already set up a network for trafficking Romanian books into Bessarabia, also formed a self-defense unit which protected their shared wealth. Vasile was at Soroca, where he signed a manifesto for Bessarabian self-determination, officially backed by the zemstvo and the gentry assembly.

Stroescu subsequently took part in the establishment of Bessarabia's own National Moldavian Party (PNM), formed on March 30 [O.S. March 17] 1917. This came only after protracted negotiations with a Transylvanian refugee, Onisifor Ghibu, who was perplexed that Bessarabians "hardly understood the importance of having a political party [...] that would militate for the national cause." Stroescu held on to an apolitical stance, replying that "he was ready to give as much as he had, but only for cultural enterprises, because politics, he said, was a dirty activity." At Kishinev in early 1917, he met the Transylvanian activist Hortensia Goga, who described him as "healthy and content, [...] seems not to be preoccupied by anything except his own person." However, Stroescu was disgusted that many able-bodied Romanian men had fled to Odessa to escape the army life. He pointed out the case of a local doctor, whom Halippa then proceeded to publicly denounce as a deserter.

Eventually, the PNM, representing the more right-wing and nationalist politicians in the Governorate, proposed Bessarabian autonomy and the creation of a national legislature, Sfatul Țării. Stroescu, as the "Grand Old Man" of nationalism, was the PNM's honorary leader, with Paul Gore as the executive president and Halippa as secretary. Later, he and Halippa attended the Soldiers' Congress in Odessa, which affirmed its support for "autonomous Bessarabia" and a federated Russian Republic. The uniformed procession paid him homage by parading in front of London Hotel, where he was staying. In June of the same year, as the gentry assembly formed a Society for Assisting Popular Education and the Study of National Customs, Stroescu became honorary chairman; Gore and Vladimir Herța were its "active presidents".

During the October Revolution and Russia's disintegration, Sfatul Țării was established and Stroescu nominally stood in the regional election. At the time, Pelivan argues, Stroescu was "a great nationalist, but less of a democrat", and alienated from his constituents because "(since 1900) he lived mostly abroad." As noted by Halippa, Stroescu and Herța were trying to set up a distinct PNM for the boyars: "their action did not lead to much [...], although we revolutionaries never objected to them being elected to Sfatul Țării [...], since we believed that all intellectual forces needed to be consulted in political matters". Historian Charles Upson Clark claims that he even served for a while as the legislature's president, during Bessarabia's brief existence as a nominally independent Moldavian Democratic Republic. However, Stroescu is known to have been seriously ill from September 1917 to the early months of 1919, leaving for England and France, and only championed the union of Bessarabia with Romania from afar. As reported by Lupu, he sailed out of Petrograd, and then undertook surgery in Paris in April 1918.

According to a report by Iustin Frățiman, some of Stroescu's charity works were destroyed during a wave of vandalism instigated by the Bolshevik soldiers in Bessarabia: "The books donated by Vasile Stroescu to one library were used to set a fire that lasted for three days on end!" In March, while Stroescu was in Paris, Sfatul Țării was visited by the Romanian Prime Minister Alexandru Marghiloman, and voted in favor of union. This was an uncertain period, with him in Allied territory while Romania capitulated to the Central Powers. At the time, Stroescu wrote his will, with Pelivan as his executor. It called for redistributing his land (much of it already taken over by the zemstvo), or, alternatively, donating it to the Romanian state; in exchange, he only demanded that peasants receive education in Romanian. As noted in 1927 by Clark, this document reflected the "comfortable old Russian patriarchal atmosphere", and was already outdated by the pace of "militant equalization"—although the dream of Romanian education was eventually fulfilled by the state itself, with its mandatory literacy programs.

=== Assembly President and dissenter ===
On September 1, 1918, from his temporary home in Paris, Stroescu joined Vasile Lucaciu and Ioan Cantacuzino in creating a National Romanian Action Committee for promoting the cause of Greater Romania in Allied countries. He later attached himself to Take Ionescu's National Committee for Romanian Unity. Following the November Armistice, Marghiloman was deposed and Romania, Bessarabia included, reentered the war. In December, this step ensured the Transylvanian union, with the new borders awaiting international recognition at the Paris Peace Conference. Throughout the following months, to Marghiloman's worry, Western powers seemed to favor placing Bessarabia, in whole or in part, under a League of Nations mandate. In September 1919, Sfatul Țării newspaper and Gazeta Transilvaniei published an interview with Stroescu, probing his opinions regarding the Bessarabian union and the disputes it had generated at the conference. He attacked "foreign renegades" such as Alexander N. Krupensky and Alexandr K. Schmidt, who had formed a delegation that opposed the union's recognition; he also expressed his disdain toward the Romanian League, formed by Herța and other landowners in an effort to oppose the coming land reform—as he argued at the time, land redistribution, as long as it was done with "rightful compensation" for landowners, was an advancement of the "peasant cause", as well as a restoration of ancient Moldavian customs. Stroescu also came out in support of other pan-Romanian causes: in March 1919, he had become honorary president of the League for the Liberation of Romanians in Timoc and Macedonia; its executive leaders included George Murnu, Sever Bocu and Tache Papahagi.

Stroescu finally arrived in Bucharest, the Romanian capital, during October 1919. In the national election of November, Halippa enlisted him as a candidate for his Bessarabian Peasants' Party (PȚB), which resulted in him representing Orhei County in the Assembly of Deputies. Stroescu shared his ticket with historian Nicolae Iorga, although the latter was not a PȚB man. As recalled by Halippa, he ran simultaneously (and won) in three other electoral precincts—Hotin, Soroca, and Bălți; and, according to other sources, also in Tighina County and Lăpușna. On November 20, as an homage to his work in promoting the Romanian cause, Stroescu was also selected to preside upon Greater Romania's first parliamentary session, effectively as the Assembly's honorary President. Praised by Iorga for its composition and style, the speech forewarned: "With a habit that has become second-nature, we scour the scene to find ways in which we may partake in the fruit of other people's labor. No, Gentlemen, this will no longer do! We must labor ourselves and commit to providing for ourselves. [...] In this life of ours we must maintain clean thoughts and clean hands." This drew attention from Marghiloman's Progressive Conservatives, disgraced for their sympathy for the Central Powers. Marghiloman was drawn to Stroescu's anti-corruption hints, namely that "the new administrations of Bessarabia should keep their hands clean."

Also on November 20, the Assembly Presidency went to Alexandru Vaida-Voevod, replaced on December 1 by Iorga; Stroescu still preserved his role as a dean of the Bessarabian caucus: on December 29, he presented for ratification the law on Romanian–Bessarabian unification, which was unanimously carried. Within weeks, however, he became a critic of the Romanian administration, speaking at the Assembly rostrum about the deteriorating situation of his native province and the state of siege it was placed under. After attending an Assembly session on December 13, Petru Groza reported seeing Stroescu openly mocked and heckled by deputies who resented his speech against the supposedly predatory habits of Romanian administrators in Bessarabia. According to Groza, this incident already signaled to the political establishment that it needed to work on making Stroescu entirely forgotten by the general public. On February 10, 1920, Stroescu took a stand against Ion Inculeț, the PȚB Minister for Bessarabia, accusing him of tolerating "oppression in savage fashion", and concluding, to his colleagues' dismay, that "the situation was better under the old Russian régime." This pitted him against the mainstream of his party, and also against Iorga. Despite shows of support from the Socialist Party benches and some PȚB deputies, Iorga suspended the session, accusing Stroescu of having "insult[ed] all the past and the future of the nation"; he was supported in this by Marghiloman. In his diary, Iorga summarized the incident: "Stroescu insulted from the rostrum this country as one of exploiters and awful clerks. I asked him to step down." In 1931, Iorga's political opponents still remembered his action on that day as "intolerable abuse".

Stroescu was also censured by Inculeț, who dismissed his speech as "café gossip" and a landowner's malcontent, noting that the Bessarabian gentry as a whole reacted with "profound egotism" to the promise of land reform. Nevertheless, Stroescu's position was endorsed by the daily Adevărul, which referred to Inculeț as a "satrap" who simply ignored criticism, and called Iorga's moderating stance "absurd diplomacy". The paper also denounced Inculeț's suggestion that those dissatisfied with his administration, Stroescu included, could opt to move to Soviet Russia. In March, according to the same Iorga, Stroescu voted "discreetly" against land reform, and then spoke out against the majority of supporters. Halippa later expressed gratitude that, during the actual partition of his land, Stroescu "never even whispered a word" against government.

According to historians Sorina and Ioan Bolovan, "Stroescu kept apart from the demagoguery, careerism and pettiness of political intrigues." He ran in Ilfov County during the May 1920 Assembly election, on the same list as Lupu—only the latter managed to obtain a seat. In July, when Lupu vacated the seat to become deputy at Chișinău, Stroescu refused to replace him at Ilfov, citing "health reasons". His absence from public life was deplored that same month by political journalist I. Peltz, who argued that "the old man of mystical effluence" had been the only one mandated to speak authentically for Bessarabia as a whole. "Seemingly a misanthrope", Stroescu was also unusually frugal—inhabiting a "small and dark room" of Athénée Palace of Bucharest, where very few visited him. He announced that he wished to visit Soviet territories, in particular Petrograd (or Leningrad)—where he had left his personal archive. When his interviewer, Ion Gorun, opined that there was little hope that the documents would still be salvageable, Stroescu retorted: "In 1915, I left a fur of mine, as well as other precious clothes I had, to a Lipovan from Odessa, and he took better care of them than I ever did. There are honest folks everywhere, just as there are, alas, plenty of worthless ones".

=== Final works in activism and death ===
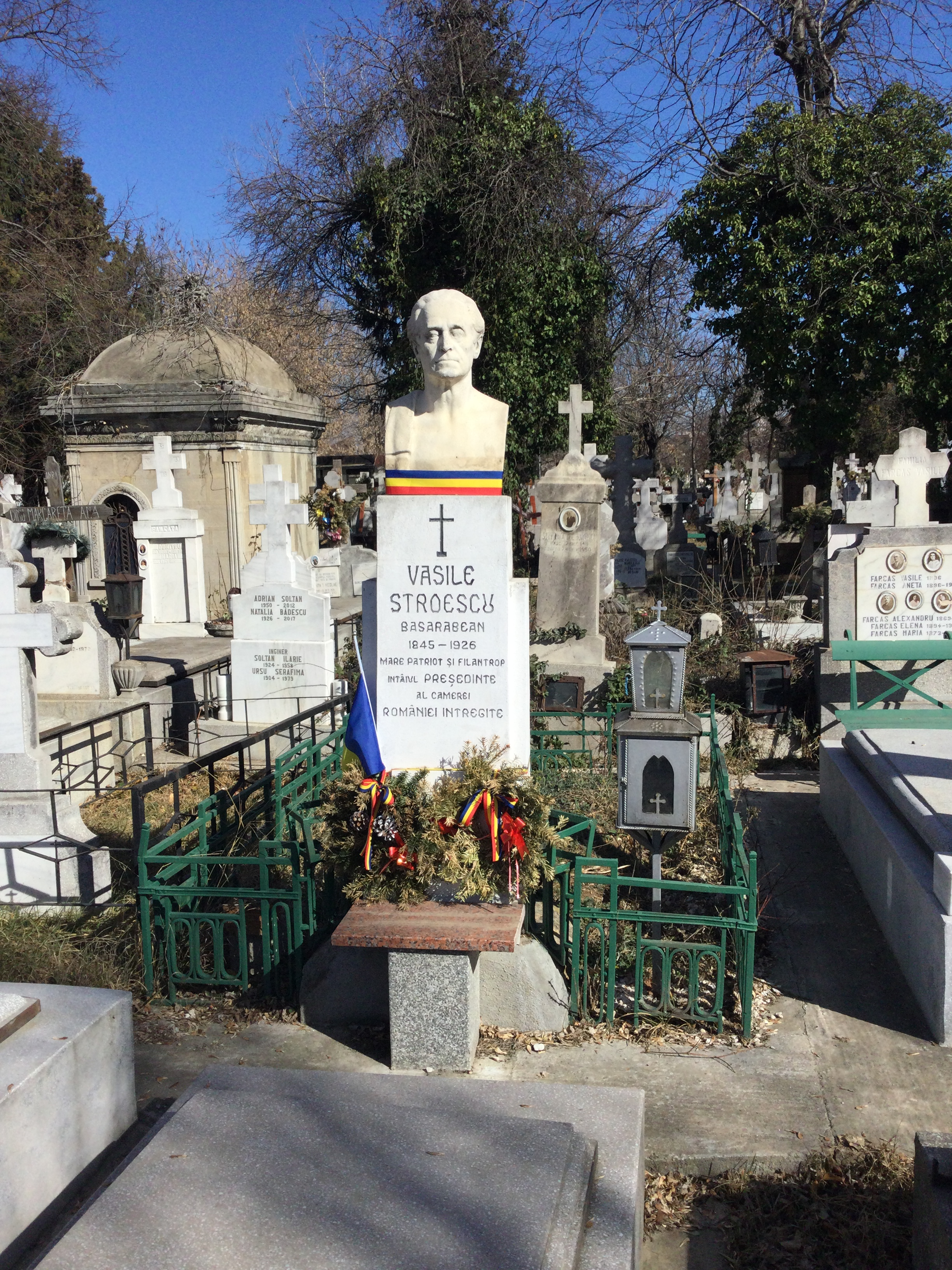
Grave at Sfânta Vineri Cemetery

In August 1923, partly as a protest against government arbitrariness, Stroescu participated in the founding of a League for Human Rights, with such members as Constantin Costa-Foru, Dem I. Dobrescu, Victor Eftimiu, Grigore Iunian, Ioan Pangal, Istrate Micescu, Ilie Moscovici, Constantin Titel Petrescu, Radu D. Rosetti, and Ștefan Voitec. He was elected its first president, with Costa-Foru serving as his secretary. His criticism of government was followed with interest in White émigré circles, where it was believed that a restored Russian monarchy should include Bessarabia. On their behalf, Krupensky suggested that Stroescu, "an honest man in spite of his accepting to be 'elected' by the Roumanian Government as one of the Bessarabian deputies", openly spoke on topics that Iorga and other establishment politicians wanted kept secret. In Soviet Russia, which advanced its own claim to Bessarabia, propagandist Christian Rakovsky also used Stroescu's words against Romanian nationalist claims in his 1925 exposé, Rumynia i Bessarabia.

With his final donation of land, Stroescu renounced his manor in Brînzeni to set up an agricultural and technical school. His prewar fund for ASTRA's public libraries, comprising 25,000 Kronen in 1914, was supplemented by the Transylvania's Directing Council and put to use in 1920. As early as September 1922, the Transylvanian-centered Romanian National Party (PNR), presided upon by Iuliu Maniu, approached Stroescu and Pelivan to obtain their membership, as well as their support for the party's extension into Bessarabia. In September 1923, the PNR finally opened a Bessarabian section, earning pledges of support from Pelivan and Teofil Ioncu. Arriving in as a delegate of the central leadership, Mihai Popovici proposed that Stroescu be made honorary regional president; his motion was unanimously backed by the PNR recruits. In his final months, Stroescu served in Senate, representing the Transylvanian constituency of Reghin. His candidacy had been put up by the PNR—though, as acknowledged in 1932 by party activist Ion Agârbiceanu, Stroescu was no longer a member of any political group, and only vaguely sympathized with "peasant democracy".

Stroescu never showed up at any election rallies, as these were held during a "harsh winter", and instead relied on Agârbiceanu to present his platform. The peasant voters remembered their benefactor, but it still took effort to persuade them that he was not an impostor hiding under a cherished name. The PNR's press reported upon his election (on January 3, 1924) that he had comfortably defeated the People's Party candidate, Ioan Harșia, who had been endorsed by Goga. The National Liberals contended that Stroescu was only elected because they had withdrawn their own candidate, "so as to prevent the great Bessarabian philanthropist from having to deal with a disappointing loss." A victory banquet was scheduled for Stroescu at Bucharest's Grand Restaurant on February 5, but had to be cancelled due to his failing health.

In a 1931 article for Curentul, Cezar Petrescu recalled: "Old man Vasile Stroescu's tears, his wailing from the Senate rostrum for Bessarabia, which had fallen prey to the wicked—his feebleness seen by his Senate colleagues, those of them who had hardened hearts and were more accustomed with our nation's penchant for mockery, as proof that he was a 'decrepit, laughable old fella'." In February 1925, on behalf of the League for Human Rights, Stroescu pleaded with King Ferdinand to investigate abuse by the Siguranța police. As he argued in his letter to the monarch, there were "hundreds of workers [that are] unlawfully arrested and detained", with many of them subject to "beatings and torture". The same month, there was a merger between the PNR and Iorga's Democratic Nationalists, but the Bessarabian chapters of both groups could not agree on a unified leadership. In that context, Stroescu was again shortlisted for the regional chairmanship. The aging senator made few new friends; one of them was the young writer Liviu Marian, whom he helped with biographical information on Bogdan Petriceicu Hasdeu's family. In June, he invited the French left-wing activist, Henri Guernut, to lecture at the League for Human Rights. This event was sabotaged by right-wing students under Sandi Bacaloglu, who declared Guernut to be anti-Romanian, and prevented him from even reaching his rostrum.

In April 1926, after taking one of his usual walks through downtown Bucharest, Stroescu fell ill with a cold, which then sparked bronchitis. One of his last visitors, Lupu, insisted that he be committed at Elisabeta Sanitarium, but, despite the doctors' efforts, he died there on April 14. His funeral service was held on April 17 at the Orthodox White Church on Calea Victoriei, and witnessed orations by priest Ioan Lupaș, who was also the incumbent Minister of Health, and by Patriarch Miron Cristea; the following day, a memorial service was held at Sibiu Cathedral. Reportedly, Stroescu had wanted to be cremated and have his ashes scattered all over Romania. He was instead awarded a state funeral at Bucharest's Sfânta Vineri Cemetery. His tomb there was later decorated with a bust by the Moldavian Mihai Onofrei, and a Bucharest street was renamed after him. The funeral itself was attended by his former colleague and rival Iorga. He noted delegates of all those who had been helped by the deceased—the church, the Bessarabian Peasantists, and the nationalists—but also that the political establishment itself was absent. In his obituary, Iorga referred to Stroescu as a "great charitable man and generous benefactor". Other obituaries appeared during the following week. They included front-page editorials in Universul, Telegraful Român, Cuvântul Ardealului, Gazeta Transilvaniei, and (penned by Ghibu) Biruința, with additional coverage in ASTRA's Societatea de Mâine.

== Legacy ==
According to Lupu, Stroescu had left two crates of documents, though one of these remained abandoned in Leningrad. As argued by journalist M. Gh. Carpen, the philanthropist had already been forgotten in Transylvania a full decade before his death; the brief revival of interest in 1920 had given way to his being tarnished by the "mud puddle" of politics. The Ministry of Education, seeing itself as a legatee of the zemstvo schools following the land reform, claimed all of Stroescu's donated estates. By early 1928, its interpretation was being challenged in court by Stroescu's blood relatives, who argued that the same land reform had nullified his 1918 will, and that the accumulated goods needed to be returned to the family.

In July 1928, Bucharest's Străbună Street was renamed after Stroescu. In December 1929, the regency council acting for King Michael I decreed that Tașlâc-Nou village in Cleaștiț, Cetatea Albă County, be renamed "Vasile Stroescu". The politician's activity was first explored methodically in an essay by Alexandru Ciulcu, published by Viața Basarabiei magazine in 1940. Just months later, Bessarabia fell under a Soviet occupation, during which Ciulcu himself was killed by the NKVD. Northern Transylvania was also absorbed by Regency Hungary after the Second Vienna Award; a street in Cluj, formally named after Stroescu, was renamed in honor of Mihály Teleki. Bessarabia again changed hands during Operation München of mid-1941. In 1942, during the briefly restored Romanian rule, Chișinău City Hall, acting on Halippa's urging, purchased another bust of Stroescu, also by Onofrei, and had it installed in a public garden.

After the 1944 Romanian coup d'état, Romania agreed to cede Bessarabia to the Soviets, but was able to recover all of Transylvania. Upon reestablishing control over Cluj, the Romanian authorities did not return all streets to their previous Romanian names: Teleki Street was renamed again, after Albert Einstein. Stroescu's memory was repressed in the postwar Moldavian SSR and, later, also in Communist Romania. Nationalized, the Brînzeni manor was turned into a psychiatric clinic. During the national communism of the 1960s, Halippa and the Bessarabian community in Bucharest tried to commemorate their former leader, but were reportedly prevented to do so by the authorities. However, in 1968, Halippa managed to invoke Stroescu and bring up the issue of his being "forgotten", with a formal address to the Academy. Such work was partly continued in America by a nephew of Stroescu's, the journalist Gheorghe Ștefan Donev (1909–1993). The repressive trend was reversed following the Romanian Revolution of 1989: his name was again granted to a street in Bucharest, and, since 2013, to a hall within the Palace of the Parliament; however, as historian Sever Dumitrașcu noted, no Transylvanian school once funded by his money ever accepted to acknowledge him in the same fashion. In independent Moldova, the lyceum in Brînzeni took his name. A Moldovan Vasile Stroescu Foundation was created, and a memorial plaque was put up in 1996 or 2000 at Trinca. Efforts have also been made to establish a memorial house in Brînzeni.

A monument, sculpted by Veaceslav Jiglițchi, was erected in the Moldovan city of Edineț in 2022.

On June 8, 2026, marking the centenary of his passing, a bronze bust dedicated to Vasile Stroescu was inaugurated in the Palace of the Parliament in Bucharest. The monument was created by Bessarabian sculptor Veceslav Jiglitchi at the initiative of the "Monumentum" Association, with the support of other cultural organizations and Romanian parliamentarians.
