= Sfatul Țării (newspaper, 1917–1920) =

- Owner: Sfatul Țării
- Editor-in-chief: Nicolae Alexandri
- Staff writers: Ion Costin, Apostol Culea, Ştefan Ciobanu, Pan Halippa, Leon Donici-Dobronravov, Tudor Pamfile, A. Cijevski, T. Negru, G. Hemniţki
- Founded: 24 November 1917
- Ceased publication: January 1920
- Language: Romanian, Russian
- Headquarters: Chişinău

Sfatul Țării ("Council of the Country") was a newspaper from the Moldavian Democratic Republic founded by Nicolae Alexandri in November 1917 as the newspaper of the legislative body Sfatul Țării. It was the first daily newspaper in Bessarabia.
