= Cuvânt Moldovenesc =

Cuvânt Moldovenesc (English: The Moldovan Word) may refer to:

- Cuvânt Moldovenesc (newspaper), a newspaper from Chişinău (1914–1920)
- Cuvânt Moldovenesc (magazine), a magazine from Chişinău (1913–1917)
