= Halippa =

Halippa is a Bessarabian surname. Notable people with the surname include:

- Ion Halippa (1871–1941), Bessarabian historian
- Pan Halippa (1883–1979), Bessarabian journalist and politician, brother of Ion
