= Chilișoaia =

Chilișoaia may refer to:

- Chilișoaia, a village in Boldurești Commune, Nisporeni district, Moldova
- Chilișoaia, a village in Dumești Commune, Iași County, Romania
