= Mârza =

Mârza may refer to:

- Mârza, a village in Sălcuța, Dolj Commune, Romania
- Mârza, a tributary of the Vișeu in Maramureș County, Romania

== Family name ==
- political figure Dumitru Mârza
- photographer Samoilă Mârza
