= Cișmea =

Cișmea may refer to several villages in Romania:

- Cișmea, a village in Țițești Commune, Argeș County
- Cișmea, a village in Răchiți Commune, Botoșani County

and to a village in Moldova:

- Cișmea, a village Pelivan Commune, Orhei district
