= Cuvânt Moldovenesc (magazine) =

- Editor: Nicolae Alexandri
- Staff writers: Pan Halippa, Simion Murafa, Simion Murafa, Ion Pelivan, Mihail Ciachir, Gheorghe Stîrcea, T. Inculeţ
- Categories: Politics, History
- Founded: 1913
- Final issue: 1917
- Country: Bessarabia
- Based in: Chișinău
- Language: Romanian

Cuvânt moldovenesc (English: Moldovan Word) was a magazine from Chișinău, Bessarabia, founded in 1913.

== History ==
The editor in chief was Nicolae Alexandri, redactors were Pan Halippa and Simion Murafa, and among the authors were: Ion Pelivan, Daniel Ciugureanu, Mihail Ciachir, Gheorghe Stârcea, T. Inculeţ. After May 1917, its successor was Școala Moldovenească of Onisifor Ghibu.

== Bibliography ==
- Georgeta Răduică, Dicţionarul presei româneşti (1731–1918), Editura Ştiinţifică, București, ISBN 973-44-0123-8
