= National Moldavian Party =

National Moldavian Party Partidul Național Moldovenesc
- Chairman: Vasile Stroescu
- Secretary-General: Pan Halippa
- Vicepresidents: Paul Gore; Vladimir Herța
- Founder: Vasile Stroescu
- Founded: 28–30 March 1917
- Dissolved: 1918
- Merged into: Bessarabian Peasants' Party
- Headquarters: Chişinău
- Newspaper: Cuvânt moldovenesc
- Ideology: Romanian nationalism Revolutionary socialism
- Political position: Center-left
- Anthem: Deșteaptă-te, române!

The National Moldavian Party was a political party in Bessarabia.

== History ==
Prior to 1917, Bessarabian intelligentsia was divided between noblemen, conservatives, democrats, and socialists. Vasile Stroescu, a rich but very modest filantrop boyar, managed to persuade all major factions to leave internal fights and at four day meeting (March 28 [O.S. March 15]–March 30 [O.S. March 17] 1917) the National Moldavian Party was created. In April 1917 the party leadership was elected. It was headed by Vasile Stroescu, having among its members Paul Gore (a renowned conservative), Vladimir Herța, Pan Halippa (a renowned socialist), Onisifor Ghibu. Among the leaders of the party were general Matei Donici, Ion Pelivan, Daniel Ciugureanu, Gurie Grosu, Nicolae Alexandri, Teofil Ioncu, P. Grosu, Mihail Minciună, Vlad Bogos, F. Corobceanu, Gheorghe Buruiană, Simeon Murafa, Pantelimon Erhan, Al. Botezat, Alexandru Groapă, Ion Codreanu, Vasile Gafencu. Many of its members were previously affiliated with the Socialist Revolutionary Party, and the PNM itself endorsed socialist policies regarding the land. Ion Buzdugan described the PNM as "revolutionary socialist and nationalist".

The party, which demanded autonomy, had a newspaper called Cuvânt moldovenesc, to which some refugees from Bukovina and Transylvania also contributed. The cornerstone of the National Moldavian Party program was to obtain political, administrative, church, school, and economic autonomy for Bessarabia. They did not hesitate to send members of the respective profession to the various congresses held in Bessarabia throughout 1917, and became very influential.

Ghibu and George Tofan were part of a group of Transylvanian and Bukovinian intellectuals which arrived in Bessarabia in the wake of the February Revolution to help organize schools in Romanian, to print books and newspapers, and to help the Bessarabians in the strife for reorganization of the political and cultural life. Intellectuals from Bukovina, Transylvania, and the Romanian Old Kingdom fleeing the war to Bessarabia, helped with the printing of Cuvânt moldovenesc, started various language, history, culture, and sciences courses, and set up a People's University (Universitatea Populară) in Chişinău.

The party was replaced by the Bessarabian Peasants' Party, founded in Chişinău on 23 August 1918.

== See also ==
- Sfatul Țării
- Working People's Party (Moldova), formerly known as the "New National Moldovan Party"

== Gallery ==
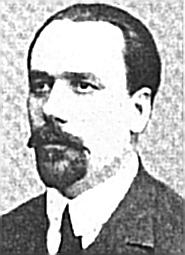
Pan Halippa

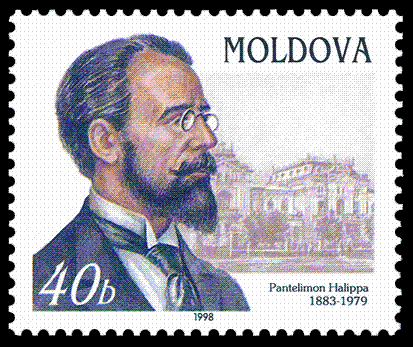
Pan Halippa and Sfatul Țării Palace

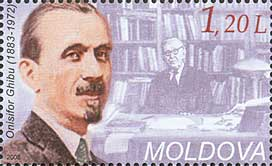
Onisifor Ghibu
