= Object 1180 =

- Obiectul 1180
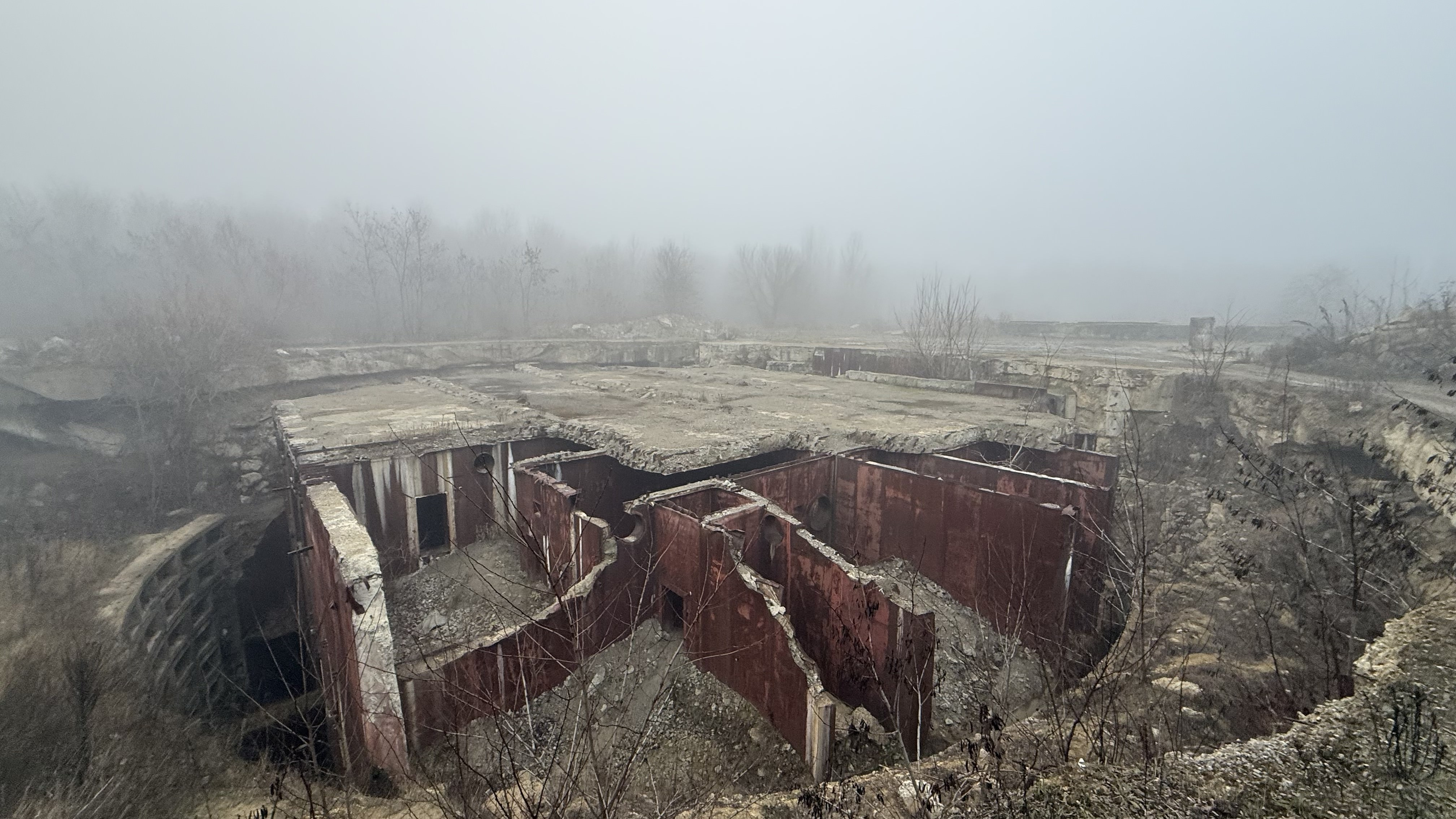
- Alternative names: Oliscani Bunker

General information
- Location: Village of Oliscani, Moldova
- Construction started: 1984-1985
- Construction stopped: 1991
- Cost: 32 million rubles

Technical details
- Floor count: 13 Underground floors

Object 1180, also known as the Olișcani bunker, is an unfinished underground structure located in the forest near the village of Olișcani, Soldănești district, Republic of Moldova. Construction began around 1984–1985 as part of the Soviet strategic infrastructure, within the framework of the Warsaw Pact, and was abandoned in 1991 after the collapse of the USSR.

== History ==
The project was initiated as a reserve command post for the General Staff of the Southwestern Directorate of the Warsaw Pact Armed Forces. The works were disguised as a civilian industrial project, with strictly controlled access and documentation withdrawn in 1991. The estimated budget was about 32 million Soviet rubles.

== Description ==
The main structure consists of two cylindrical reinforced concrete bodies (diameter ~32–36 m, depth ~60 m, 12–13 underground levels), interconnected by galleries. Technical systems (ventilation, electricity, communications) have not been installed. Above ground there are foundations of auxiliary buildings, including a 5-storey residential block (without finishing), administrative buildings and access roads made of concrete slabs.

== Current status ==
Currently, the complex is severely degraded. The lower levels are flooded, access is limited, the structures are rusted and overgrown. It is managed by the Moldsilva Agency (state forest fund, ~196 ha of associated forest). It does not have the status of a protected monument and access is unofficial/dangerous.
