= Bessarabian Peasants' Party =

Bessarabian Peasants' Party Moldavian National Democratic Party Partidul Țărănesc din Basarabia Partidul Național-Democrat Moldovenesc
- President: Pan Halippa (1918–1921); Ion Inculeț (1921–1923); Ion Pelivan (1923)
- Vice-presidents: Anton Crihan; Ștefan Ciobanu
- Founded: August 23, 1918
- Dissolved: September 1923
- Preceded by: National Moldavian Party
- Merged into: National Liberal Party; Peasants' Party; Romanian National Party
- Headquarters: Chișinău, Bessarabia
- Newspaper: Cuvânt Moldovenesc; Viața Basarabiei; Basarabia; Glasul Basarabiei
- Ideology: Agrarianism; Ethnic nationalism (Romanian); Anticommunism; Regionalism; Agrarian socialism (minority); Separatism (minority)
- Political position: Center-right to far-left
- National affiliation: Parliamentary Bloc (1919); Federation of National Social Democracy (1920–1921); Bessarabian Bloc (1923)

The Bessarabian Peasants' Party (Romanian: Partidul Țărănesc din Basarabia, PȚB or PȚ-Bas; also Partidul Țărănesc Basarabean, Partidul Țărănist Basarabean) or Moldavian National Democratic Party (Partidul Național-Democrat Moldovenesc) was an agrarian political party, active in the Kingdom of Romania and, more specifically, the region of Bessarabia. Comprising various pro-Romanian and regionalist factions that had existed within the Moldavian Democratic Republic, it was brought together by shared opposition to Bolshevik Russia and communism. The PȚB, founded in August 1918, was led by Pan Halippa and Ion Inculeț, originally representing, respectively, its right and left wings; Ion Pelivan was the co-chair.

Effectively the government party of Bessarabia in the wake of its formal union with Romania, the PȚB scored a major victory in the 1919 election, when it emerged as the third most popular party in Greater Romania, and an essential partner in government. It was therefore co-opted by the Parliamentary Bloc, formed around the Romanian National Party, until the latter's government was brought down by the People's Party. Although losing several of its chapters before the 1920 elections, it still won Bessarabia by a significant margin, openly embracing the cause of decentralization and regional autonomy.

Rallied with the national opposition by 1921, the PȚB was effectively split over merging into a caucus formed by Ion Mihalache's Peasants' Party and the independent agrarian faction led by Constantin Stere. Halippa supported such a fusion, and took his supporters out of the PȚB; Inculeț reclaimed for himself the party leadership, and, in 1922, formed an alliance with the governing National Liberals. Marginally defeating Halippa and Stere in the election of 1922, the PȚB was again co-opted into government. Inculeț and his supporters entered the National Liberal Party in early 1923, leaving the surviving rump party, led by Ion Pelivan, to merge with the Romanian National Party in September.

== History ==
=== Origins ===
The PȚB was officially founded in Chișinău on August 23, 1918, some months after Bessarabia's union with Romania. It was the fusion of two groups that has previously existed in the Moldavian Democratic Republic. Many cadres, including Halippa, had belonged to the "Moldavian Bloc", which represented Romanian nationalism faction within Sfatul Țării, the republican legislature. The Bloc itself was a relic of the National Moldavian Party (PNM), which had existed after the February Revolution—when Bessarabia was still part of the Russian Republic. According to historian Andrei Cemârtan: "The [PȚB] members themselves made no effort to conceal that only the name had changed, meaning more precisely that the National Moldavian Party had become the Peasants' Party, as circumstances had changed."

On its left, the PȚB also incorporated ethnic Romanians who had caucused with Sfatul Țării's "Peasant Faction" (Fracția Țărănească). The latter's notable members were Inculeț (its nominal leader), Pantelimon Erhan, and Vladimir Tsyganko. References to a "Bessarabian Peasants' Party" date back to the era before World War I. A faction of that name existed in the Russian State Duma after the 1907 election. Centered on Dionisy Gulikin, it campaigned for the recognition of Romanian as a state language of Russia. The same title was later used in common parlance for the Peasants' Faction of Sfatul Țării.

Various Peasant Faction affiliates, like other future PȚB cadres, had belonged to left-wing parties in Russia. Inculeț and Daniel Ciugureanu had been Esers, and had for long maintained links with the Russian Provisional Government. More to the left, Ion Buzdugan and Gherman Pântea had caucused with the Bolsheviks. In November 1917, almost a year before the PȚB's formal registration, a party of the same name had participated in the ill-fated election for the Constituent Assembly. Its list included, among others, Inculeț, Pântea, and Halippa. While the election results "were never fully tabulated", later counts indicated the Peasants' Soviet as one of the most important political players, winning between 35% and 37% of the accounted votes, with strong support from the Romanian-speaking rural population. The results would have allowed the party to hold 5 of the 13 Bessarabian deputy seats, as many as the local Esers; in contrast, the PNM, only gathering 2–3% of the vote, would have failed to win any.

During the same month, Inculeț was elected the Moldavian Republic's President by his colleagues in Sfatul. According to scholar Charles Upson Clark, his collaboration with the Moldavian Bloc was purely pragmatic: since the October Revolution had toppled the Esers, he switched from supporting Russian federalism to preserving his republic as an independent state, and needed the nationalists' backing. Pelivan was always suspicious of the President's true motivations, and later went on record with allegations that Inculeț was unreliable and not in fact devoted to his country, but "belonged to the Russian nation." Inculeț defended himself against such charges. In his account, he had merely passed himself off for a revolutionary, in hopes of dissuading radicals from toppling his government, and "hide his [patriotic] sentiments".

In his tenure as president, Inculeț reluctantly allowed the Romanian Land Forces to assume effective control of the country, hoping to use them against the Bolshevik insurgents. Urged on by Inculeț, Ciugureanu and Pantelimon Erhan, Sfatul declared the republic's full independence on January 23, 1918. In March, this was reversed by a new vote on union, with Inculeț and Ciugureanu becoming Ministers for Bessarabia in the Romanian cabinet of Alexandru Marghiloman. Both of them, together with Pelivan, were elected to the Assembly of Deputies for Romanian colleges in the summer 1918 race.

Left-wing members of the Peasant Faction and the PȚB
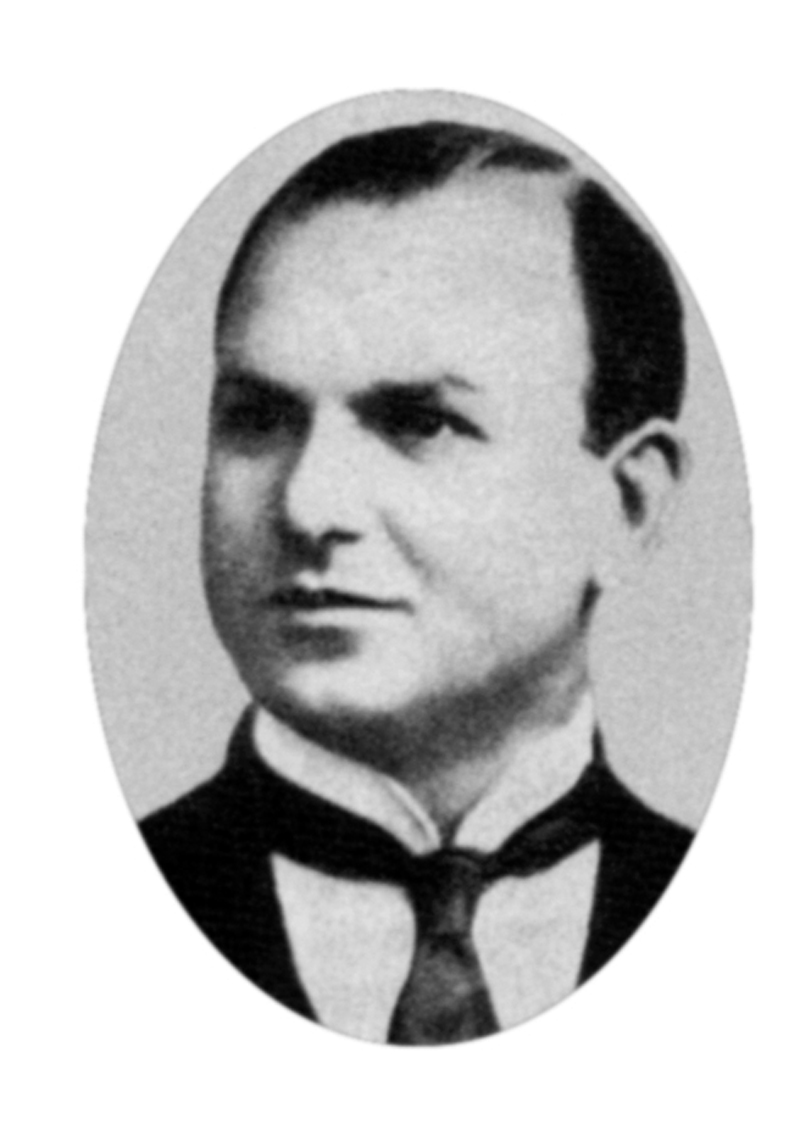
Ion Inculeț, ca. 1918

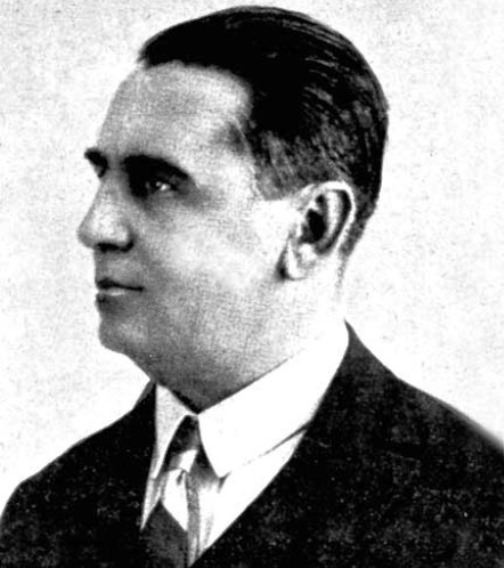
Daniel Ciugureanu, ca. 1930

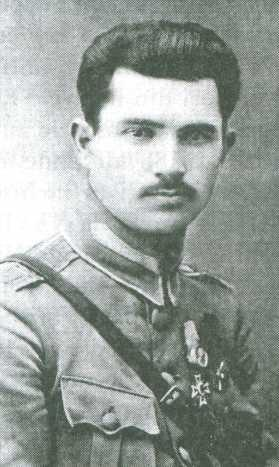
Gherman Pântea, ca. 1918

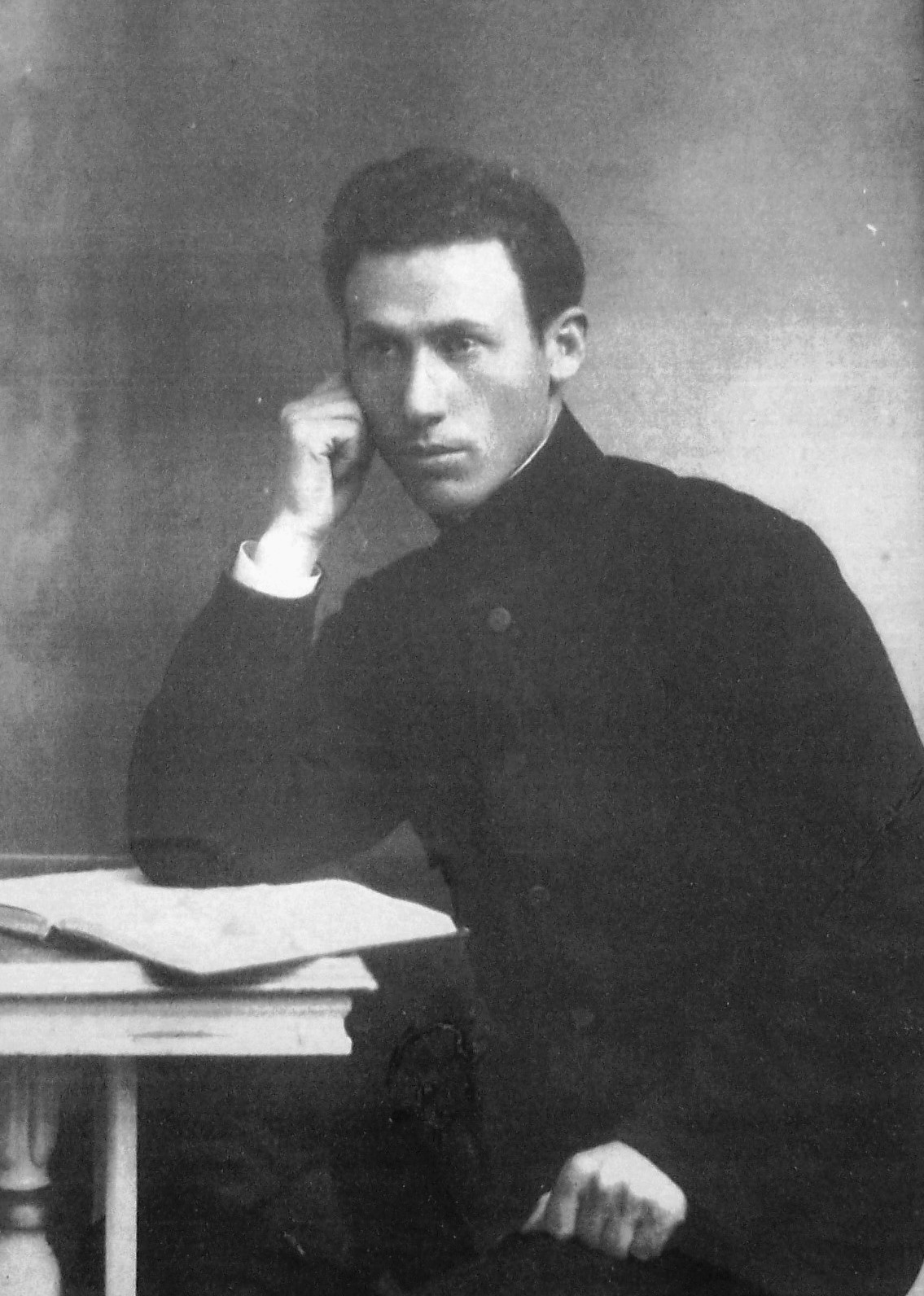
Ion Buzdugan, ca. 1914

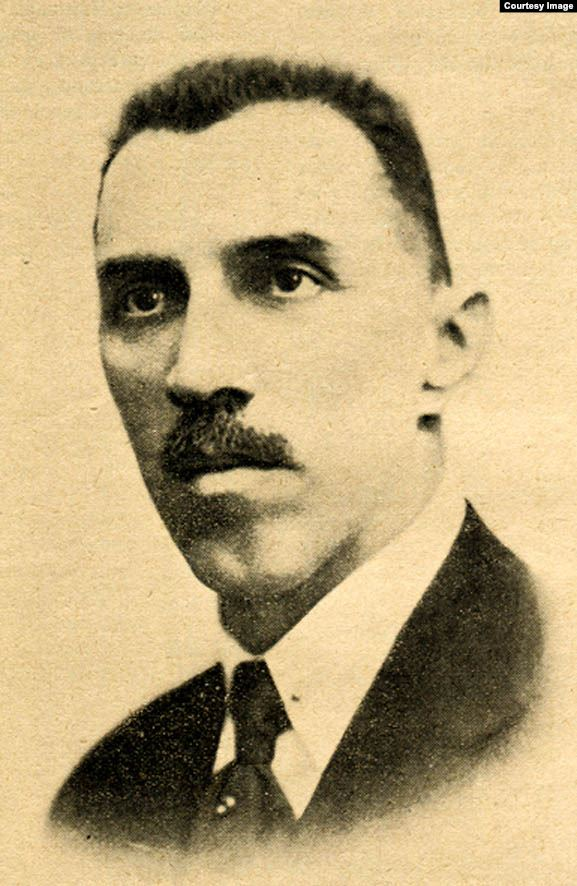
Pantelimon Erhan, ca. 1930

=== Early goals ===
According to Cemârtan, the new party's creation reflected Bessarabian suspicion of Marghiloman's politics, and in particular their fear that his Conservative Party was against their desired agrarian reform. In its first session of 1918, the PȚB elected Halippa as chairman; Pelivan and Ștefan Holban were Vice Presidents. The first-ever Central Committee (CC) included Halippa, Holban, Inculeț, Ciugureanu, Teofil Ioncu, Gheorghe Stârcea, and several members of the autonomous Bessarabian Directorate: Petru Cazacu (the Director-in-Chief), Nicolae Bivol, Ștefan Ciobanu, Ion Costin.

The new nationalist–agrarian alliance stood for a radical platform, demanding land reform with full expropriation, and the preservation of regional autonomy within Greater Romania. Other main proposals were universal suffrage (including for women), incentives for cooperative farming, and the introduction of free primary education. It chose the name of "Bessarabian Peasants' Party" only at the last minute: Halippa and Ciugureanu had proposed the name of "National Democratic Party", which continued to be used as an alternative for months after the party's establishment. That name had been used by Pelivan and Halippa around 1906, when they first associated with Constantin Stere and Emanuil Gavriliță in putting out the newspaper Basarabia.

In November 1918, various of its Sfatul deputies—including Tsyganko, Vladimir Cristi, Mihail Minciună and Teodor Nichitiuc—joined a protest alongside delegates from the Moldavian Bloc, the ethnic minorities, and the trade unions. They demanded the reversal of Romania's martial law and elections for a new regional assembly. The party helped to push through its land reform project during the very last session of the Bessarabian legislature (November 27). By then, however, the PȚB as a whole had switched to a more moderate land reform project (with compensation) and an acceptance of centralism. Ciugureanu served as Minister for Bessarabia in the government team of Constantin Coandă, and obtained that he and other members of the regional administration be allowed to stand in elections without renouncing their offices. On November 17, the PȚB absorbed the Bessarabian People's League (LPB), which had existed since September. On December 6, former LPB leader Vasile Bârcă was made PȚB Vice President, alongside Ciobanu, while Holban became the Cashier.

The arrival to power in Romania of a National Liberal Party (PNL) cabinet maintained PȚB leaders into the ranks of Bessarabia's administration. At a regional level, the PȚB soon found itself confronted by another nationalist group, called "Romanian League". Formed by Cazacu and Vladimir Herța in March 1919, it was explicitly dedicated to tackling the Bessarabian Peasantists' "absolutism and exclusivity". It accused Halippa of having dismantled the old network of administrative autonomy and civil liberties, in particular the zemstva. While the PȚB caucused with the PNL at a central level, the League joined up with the opposition Conservative-Democratic Party. Pelivan, who lobbied for Bessarabia at the Paris Peace Conference, wrote back to Inculeț complaining that the Romanian administration was being vilified by "the Russians and the Jews". When the Esers' Bessarabian envoy, Mark Slonim, alleged that the region actually resisted incorporation into Romania, Inculeț called him "idiotic".

Triumvirate leadership of the PȚB, 1918
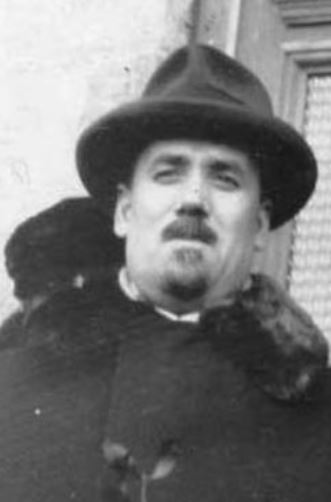
Pan Halippa, ca. 1930

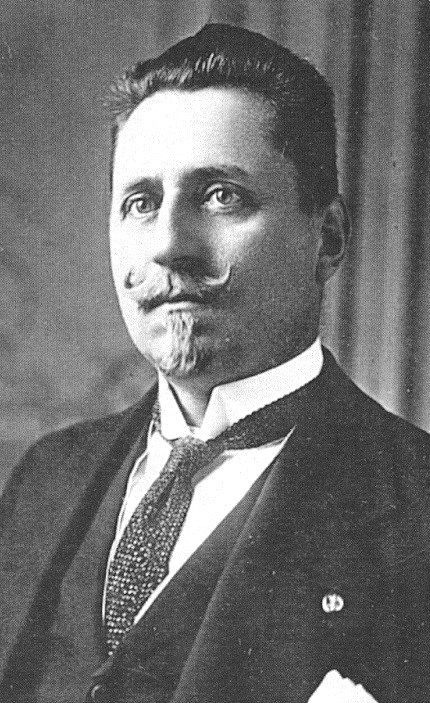
Ion Pelivan, ca. 1910

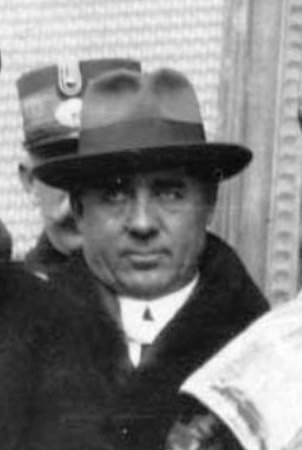
Ștefan Holban, ca. 1930

The PȚB soon began organizing itself locally. Its first newspaper was Cuvânt Moldovenesc, the old PNM tribune, which it relaunched in a new edition in 1918. Other political tribunes appeared only in 1919, with the Cahul-based weekly Cuvântul Țăranului (1919). In 1918, Haralambie Vizanti had already set the Peasants' Party of Cahul County, which aimed to be recognized as a PȚB section. This recognition never arrived: in January 1919, the PȚB informed Vizanti and his followers that a team under Ion Balbărău represented it locally. As a result, Vizanti joined the Romanian League in forming a "conservative nationalist" caucus, directly competing with the PȚB.

There followed several months of campaigning through small-scale "peasant congresses", attended by party eminences. Pântea organized one such meeting for Cetatea Albă County on February 4, 1919. Over the following weeks and months, this section enlisted members from various cultural backgrounds. These included Dionisie Erhan, a hierarch of the Bessarabian Orthodox Metropolis, alongside Daniel Erdmann and Andreas Widmer, both of whom were leaders of the Bessarabian Germans; other affiliates were local Ukrainians and Bulgarians. Historian Ion Gumenâi also notes that most of those who declared for the PȚB in Hotin County during early 1919 were either Slavs or Bessarabian Jews.

On April 27–29, 1919, Halippa, Bârcă and Minciună organized the Peasant Congress, where 130 rural delegates from across Bessarabia were invited to weigh in on the land reform project, and also to read the PȚB program. This defined the party line to be preserved for the general election of November 1919, which were Romania's first experience of universal male suffrage. There followed an enlargement and reshuffling in April 1919. Bivol, Cazacu, Costin and Stârcea were out; new members of the CC included Buzdugan, P. Erhan, Minciună, Pântea, Pelivan, Anton Crihan, Vasile Mândrescu, Nicolae Secară, and Nicolae Suruceanu. Crihan and Ciobanu were the two Vice Presidents, while Halippa was reconfirmed as chairman. The party also selected a political symbol and electoral logo: the scythe and rake, crossed. In the electoral precincts of Hotin County, this symbol was replaced by a sickle.

=== Parliamentary Bloc ===
The party registered major gains in the election of November 1919, the first to involve all of Greater Romania. The PȚB was effectively in alliance with the Democratic Nationalist Party (PND), which was based in Romania-proper, with the Romanian National Party (PNR) of Transylvania, and the Democratic Union Party (PDU) of Bukovina. The PND leader, Nicolae Iorga, ran for the Assembly on a PȚB list at Orhei, alongside Vasile Stroescu, who was a doyen of the PNM and the emancipation movement. The PȚB also proposed eligible positions to Ion Nistor of the PDU and Iuliu Maniu of the PNR, but they turned down the offer. Artur Văitoianu, the nominally independent Prime Minister of Romania, approached the PȚB to become their candidate in Ismail County. Although favored by Halippa, this attempt was rejected by Inculeț, and became the first of several incidents separating the two leaders.

Before this election, the PȚB had incorporated into its ranks an anticommunist group, the Bessarabian League against Bolshevism, whose founder, General Alexandru Anastasiu, ran on Peasantist lists for the Senate. However, according to the Romanian historian (and PNL politico) Gheorghe Brătianu, the Bessarabian votes were mainly drawn by the party's "far-left", reflecting the Bessarabian's public's rejection of the Romanian establishment. In Lăpușna County, the PȚB received backing from left-wing Jews, including formal pledges of support by the General Bund; the old leftist Zamfir Arbore successfully ran on the PȚB list for a Senate seat at Chișinău.

Lastly, members of the PȚB administration were alleged by their political adversaries to have committed fraud and abuse of power, with the election taking place under a state of siege. Some consequently boycotted the election altogether. The Romanian League only put up candidates in Cahul County, which it won; it remained the only constituency not fully carried by the Peasantists. The PȚB had virtually no adversaries in Hotin and Ismail, for either the Assembly or the Senate. It was similarly unchallenged for the Assembly seats of Tighina, where the list was headed by Pantelimon Erhan. The Bessarabian Peasantists won the majority of regional votes and emerged as the third party nationally, with 72 seats in the Assembly—the PNL had 103, just ahead of its rival, the PNR, which had 99. Stroescu was the Assembly's oldest member, and as such entitled to lead procedures in the absence of an elected Assembly President; he was also the first Bessarabian to hold that distinction. The PȚB also sent 37 of its members to Senate, almost the totality of Bessarabian delegates to that chamber.

The victory of a unionist party was held in Romania as a democratic reconfirmation of the unification, and effectively a plebiscite. It was used as evidence of the union's legality by the PȚB itself, against the claims stated by the Bolsheviks, the White émigrés, and the Ukrainian People's Republic, all of whom demanded a partition of Bessarabia. Nevertheless, the PȚB also expressed reserves toward Romanian centralism, and, for a while, its leaders contemplated forming a purely regionalistic alliance with other deputies from Bessarabia, Bukovina, Transylvania and the Banat. As summarized by Cemârtan: "The Bessarabian elites and public opinion preferred to avoid the consecrated parties, since [their regional] extension could bring with it undesirable customs and methods."

The party only found ideological common ground with Ion Mihalache's Peasants' Party (PȚ), which had taken fourth place. The two groups agreed on principle to endorse a national platform of peasant rights and representation; delegates such as Bârcă began discussing the possibility of a fusion "sometime in the near future". In the Assembly, the PȚB had a crucial role to play: its deputies were vital to any governing coalition. On November 25, after intense debates, the PȚB and the PND agreed to back Parliamentary Bloc and its Prime Minister-designate, Alexandru Vaida-Voevod. The Bloc also comprised the PȚ, the PDU, and remnants of the Labor Party. Inculeț, Halippa and Pelivan were all appointed to ministerial office in the Vaida cabinet. On December 25, Alexandru Mîță, as deputy-elect of Bălți County, reportedly addressed Vaida a letter of protest, which referred to Romanian authorities as engaged in "terrifying crimes" against the Bessarabian populace. That text also argued that Bessarabians had come to resent Romanians as a whole, disparagingly referring to them as "Gypsies". As noted by academic Iulian Chifu, Mîță's appeal was much quoted in later autonomist and Moldovenist literature, but does not appear at all in parliamentary records.

PȚB electoral performance. Green indicates counties won in the November 1919 landslide; darker green is the tri-county area providing the party with its most consistent support through to its disbanding in 1923

Despite Iorga's repeated efforts to enact the land reform on the coalition's own terms, the Vaida government was ordered to step down by King Ferdinand I, who assigned the premiership to Alexandru Averescu (March 1920). Internal divisions caused the PȚB to split weeks before the May elections. Averescu's People's Party (PP) extended an offer for merger. Inculeț accepted it, but was threatened by his colleagues with expulsion. On April 21, a PȚB Congress forced him to renounce his position as Minister for Bessarabia, which he had maintained under six consecutive regimes. A small faction, led by Sergiu Niță, broke out of the PȚB and joined Averescu. Dissatisfied with work in the opposition, Ciugureanu and his followers also separated and ran as a "Democratic Union Party of Bessarabia", but, failing to win any seats, went over to the PNL. Inculeț later claimed that he had sidelined Ciugureanu, whom he accused of carrying out "personal business" from within the party.

=== Move toward autonomism ===
The party, which set up other local newspapers, including Viața Basarabiei of Chișinău (founded 1921) and Secera of Ismail city (1922), adhered to the PȚ-led Federation of National Social Democracy (FDNS), comprising the bulk of opposition forces. Meanwhile, Niță was rewarded with the office of Minister for Bessarabia, and his centralizing campaign pitted him against his former colleagues. Bârcă (himself a former member of the PP), accused Niță of having purged the administration of its PȚB cadres. In another confrontation, Crihan, the PȚB deputy for Bălți County, expressed his dissatisfaction: "We did not conceive of Bessarabia's union with Romania as where we give it to you for exploitation." The same was argued by Pelivan, according to whom a "truly democratic state" required "full decentralization of the administrative and economic life." In turn, the PP's Vladimir Chiorescu accused Ciugureanu and Inculeț of having "monopolized" regional power, "pushing out of their way each and all valuable Bessarabian element". He also denied that the PȚB had played any part in securing the union.

The Congress also adopted a new program, comprising radical, "at times socialistic", demands, and acquiring "a radical leftist orientation". It restated the need for a universal land reform, while adding new demands: a non-political form of self-government, the minimum wage, workers' participation in management, and the dismantling of the Gendarmerie—to be replaced with "preferably locally recruited" peace officers. Some of the party's deputies became noted within the FDNS for their radicalism, embracing separatism; the moderates, under Pelivan, were inclined toward the PNL, which promised them limited autonomy. Pelivan was critical of the government's decision to disestablish the regional Directorate, which had handled executive power in Bessarabia, noting that "many [Russian] civil servants are now going hungry", and alleging that a spoils system was being set up by Romanian administrators in "Romania's California". He also pleaded for the reintroduction of the zemstva, and proposed that they be adopted in the Old Kingdom as well. An appeasement of the party came in April 1920, when Averescu reintroduced Bessarabian ideas in his own land reform law, reducing the sum owed in compensation to the dispossessed landowners.

The elections themselves were noted for their physical confrontations between government and opposition. Inculeț was arrested while campaigning in Comrat; in Cornești, a Gendarme shot and killed two peasants, trying to quell agitation by a PȚB candidate. As noted in administrative reports of the era, the public itself was voting against centralism, for the party that promised them to disband the Gendarmerie. Despite its weakening splits and the violent incidents on the campaign trail, the PȚB was able to win 23 (or 25) mandates in the Assembly and 6 in the Senate, with a plurality of the regional vote (48%), just ahead of the PP (at 46%). Its fief was a tri-county area comprising Bălți, Tighina and Soroca, where it won an absolute victory; it lost Ismail County (Avrescu's birthplace), taken by the PP in a landslide.

The PȚB's stand within the opposition became a cause for disputes among the other parties. Beginning in March, its envoys began talks of a fusion with Mihalache's PȚ. This move was resisted by Pelivan especially, who believed that political life also required decentralization. The talks also involved the PND, but Iorga rejected the close alliance between the PȚB and Constantin Stere, whom Iorga regarded as a wartime traitor. After excluding Andrei Scobioală, Halippa had managed to have Stere run as a PȚB candidate, but not a PȚB member, in the by-elections of Soroca. During the early months of 1921, the opposition collapsed into factions. Iorga, the Assembly President, refused to validate Stere's deputy mandate—meeting opprobrium from an ad-hoc coalition of PȚB-ists, Laborites and Socialists. The issue was taken up by a November 1920 Congress, which voted to continue with the FDNS, but also vetoed any merger.

Halippa and Stere stood together. According to Iorga, Halippa threatened with a parliamentary walkout, while Stere announced (to Inculeț's annoyance) that Bessarabia was ripe for revolution. Moving to the center, Inculeț vetoed Stere's adherence to the PȚB, his stand-off with Halippa almost splitting the party in two. After a new party congress in May 1921, both Halippa and Inculeț dismissed persistent rumors that Stere's "Independent Peasants' Party" had merged into the PȚB, despite Mihalache's interventions in favor of Stere. Halippa's supporters passed a resolution approving of a later union with the PȚ, and also stating their implicit collaboration with "all democratic forces" against "the reactionary tendencies of the oligarchy". Such terminology referred to the PP and the PNL, and alienated the Inculeț group, who were moving closer to an understanding with the National Liberals.

=== Schisms and dissolution ===
Over the following month, Stere managed to obtain the PȚ adhesion of seven PȚB deputies, including Halippa and Ion Codreanu. On July 18, Halippa, Stere, and 10 other deputies formally adhered to the PȚ. They "retained some autonomy" within the latter, ensuring an important Bessarabian electoral basis for Mihalache. The core faction of the PȚB, led by Inculeț, assumed control of the party during Halippa's absence, which prevented the merger from being more than a schism. On July 22, the party voted to expel Halippa, Buzdugan, Holban, and Minciună. Inculeț was chairman, seconded by Pelivan and Bârcă; Ion Macovei, Mîță, A. Gropa and E. Dumbravă were co-opted on the CC. In fact, several of the latter had already left the party and sided with Halippa. The Inculeț party only represented two Bessarabian constituencies (Lăpușna and Orhei); the rest went over to Halippa or ceased to be.

Inculeț registered the scythe-and-rake symbol as his own, but had to sell his Cuvânt Moldovenesc to keep the party from going bankrupt. The party newspapers became Glasul Basarabiei and Pântea's own Basarabia. The latter attacked Halippa frequently, calling him such epithets as "chauvinistic" and "uncouth". The PȚB quit the FDNS and allied itself to the PNL, but asked in return that the latter party abandon its electoral chapters in Bessarabia. In early 1922, Ion I. C. Brătianu formed a National Liberal cabinet, and called in general elections in March. The Inculeț group, also known locally as the "Peasants' Liberal Party" (Partidul Țărănesc Liberal) or "Independent Party of the Bessarabian Peasants", only collaborated with the PNL in Ismail and Cetatea Albă counties; elsewhere, it ran as an opposition party. The campaign was primarily fought against Stere and the PȚ, and focused on emphasizing the party's image as the true inheritor of agrarian legitimacy. Such tactics were later excoriated by Stere, who called the PȚB "demagogic" and "anti-national".

The results were mixed. In the early race for the Senate, the gains were very small: Inculeț and his PNL allies had between them 13 seats, while the PȚ had won 11, with Stere personally defeating Inculeț at Bălți. With open and fraudulent support from the PNL government, Inculeț repeated some his 1919 success in the contest for the Assembly. The PȚB obtained 22 deputy seats and the fourth position nationally, while, in Bessarabia, Halippa's PȚ chapter only won 7 seats (the Averescu party registered less than 2% regionally).

On March 12, the PNL, PȚB and PDU formed a governing coalition supporting Brătianu. Inculeț, having retaken his post of Minister for Bessarabia, set up a new Central Committee, with members such as Pântea and Bârcă, in October 1922. Consequently, Pelivan and Crihan reestablished the old CC, and voted to expel the others, accusing them of sabotage, and to sever all links with the government. The Inculeț group joined the PNL on January 20, 1923, and, alongside Ciugureanu's group, established the historically strong National Liberal chapter in Chișinău. The two prominent leaders headed a distinct and marginalized faction within the larger party, often critical of the PNL's selection of cadres. They also had a long-standing conflict with each other. A minor PȚB, with Pelivan at its helm, caucused with the PȚ within a "Bessarabian Bloc", which, in March 1923, signed up to a protest against the PNL's "attempt at enslaving an entire people". At the time, there were six PȚB parliamentarians: Bivol, Crihan, Pelivan, Vladimir Cazacliu, Porfirie Fală, and Constantin Morariu. The group only survived independently until September of that year, when Pelivan himself signed up with the opposition PNR.

== Electoral history ==
=== Legislative elections ===
Election	Votes	%	Assembly	Senate	Position
1919			72 / 568	35 / 216	3rd
1920			23 / 366	6 / 166	5th
1922			22 / 372	13 / 148	4th
