= Ion Codreanu (politician) =

Moldovan politician (1879–1949)

Member of the Moldovan Parliament
- In office 1917–1918

Personal details
- Born: 14 April 1879 Ștefănești, Florești, Soroca County
- Died: 15 February 1949 (aged 69) Bucharest
- Party: Bessarabian Peasants' Party
- Other political affiliations: National Moldavian Party
- Profession: Landlord

Ion Stepanovici Codreanu (born 14 April 1879 Ștefănești, Florești, Soroca County; died 15 February 1949 Bucharest) was a Moldovan politician.

== Biography ==
In 1917, Codreanu was a founding member of the National Moldavian Party. Soon after, he was elected as a member of the Moldovan Parliament.

After the Soviet invasion of Bessarabia in 1940, he became a political prisoner in USSR, but in May 1941, he was exchanged for the Communist Ana Pauker.
