= Cuvânt Moldovenesc (newspaper) =

Bessarabian newspaper, 1914–1919

Cuvânt moldovenesc
- Type: weekly
- Owner: Vasile Stroescu
- Founder: Nicolae Alexandri
- Publisher: National Moldavian Party
- Editor-in-chief: Nicolae Alexandri; Pan Halippa
- Founded: January 1, 1914
- Ceased publication: January 7, 1919
- Language: Moldovan

Cuvînt moldovenesc (English: The Moldovan Word) was a Bessarabian newspaper.

== History ==
The first edition was printed on January 1, 1914 and last on January 7, 1919. The first editor in chief was Nicolae Alexandri, replaced on April 2, 1917 by Pan Halippa. Among the authors were Simion Murafa, Ion Pelivan, Daniel Ciugureanu, M. Ciachir, Gh. Stîrcea, and T. Inculeţ. It was written with the Romanian Cyrillic alphabet .

On March 21, 1943, Cuvînt moldovenesc reappeared under the leadership of Leon Boga and Iorgu Tudor.

== Bibliography ==
- Georgeta Răduică, Dicţionarul presei româneşti (1731–1918), Editura Ştiinţifică, București, ISBN 973-44-0123-8
