= Cubolta =

- Commune
- Location in Moldova
- Coordinates: 47°52′N 28°02′E
- Country: Moldova
- District: Sîngerei District

Population (2014)
  - Total: 1,814
- Time zone: UTC+2 (EET)
  - Summer (DST): UTC+3 (EEST)

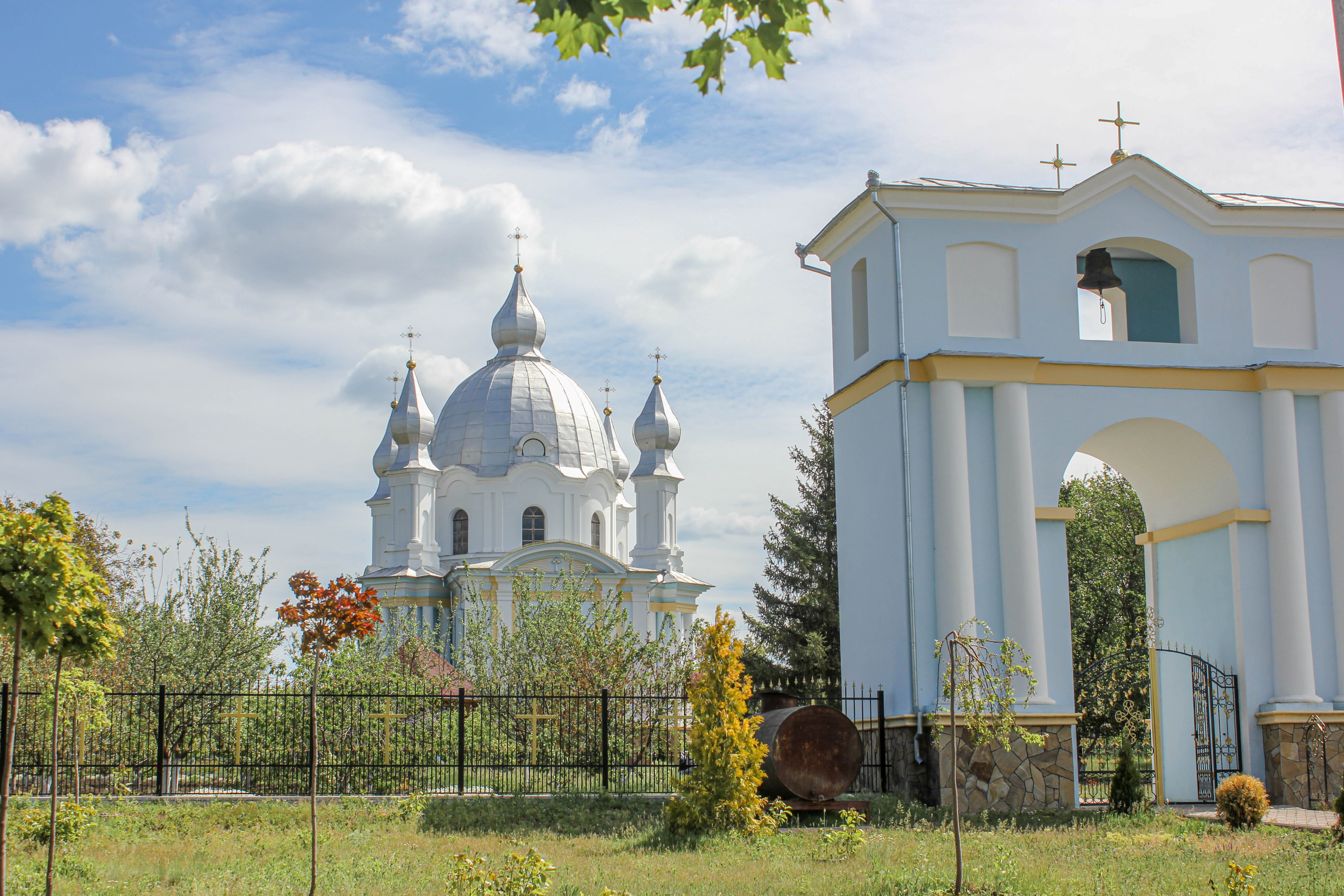
"St. Elizabeth" Church with the bell tower, Cubolta

Cubolta is a commune in Sîngerei District, Moldova. It is composed of two villages, Cubolta and Mărășești.

== Notable people ==
- Ion Halippa
- Pan Halippa
- Sergiu Grossu
