= Vladimir Bogos =

Moldovan politician (1893–1950)

Member of the Moldovan Parliament
- In office 1917–1918

Personal details
- Born: 1 April 1893 Boldureşti
- Died: 1950
- Party: National Moldavian Party

Vladimir Bogos (born 1 April 1893, Boldureşti; died 1950) was a physician, journalist and Romanian politician who was part of the Bessarabian Parliament. On 27 March 1918 Vladimir Bogos voted the Union of Bessarabia with Romania.

== Biography ==
He served as Member of the Moldovan Parliament (1917–1918).

== Gallery ==
Moldovan stamp, 1998

== Bibliography ==
- Gheorghe E. Cojocaru, Sfatul Țării: itinerar, Civitas, Chişinău, 1998, ISBN 9975-936-20-2
- Mihai Taşcă, Sfatul Țării şi actualele autorităţi locale, "Timpul de dimineaţă", no. 114 (849), 27 June 2008 (page 16)
