= Bădragii Vechi =

- Commune and village
- Location in Moldova
- Coordinates: 48°02′N 27°06′E
- Country: Moldova
- District: Edineț District
- Elevation: 407 ft (124 m)

Population (2014 census)
  - Total: 619
- Time zone: UTC+2 (EET)
  - Summer (DST): UTC+3 (EEST)
- Postal code: MD-4613
- Area code: +373 246

Bădragii Vechi is a village in Edineț District, Moldova.

== Notable people ==
- Dumitru Mârza
