= Pelivan =

- Commune
- Interactive map of Pelivan
- Country: Moldova
- District: Orhei District

Population (2014)
  - Total: 3,257
- Time zone: UTC+2 (EET)
  - Summer (DST): UTC+3 (EEST)

Pelivan is a commune in Orhei District, Moldova. It is composed of two villages, Cișmea and Pelivan.

Pelivan village was named after Ion Pelivan in 1932.
