= Dumitru Mârza =

Bessarabian politician (1894–1967)

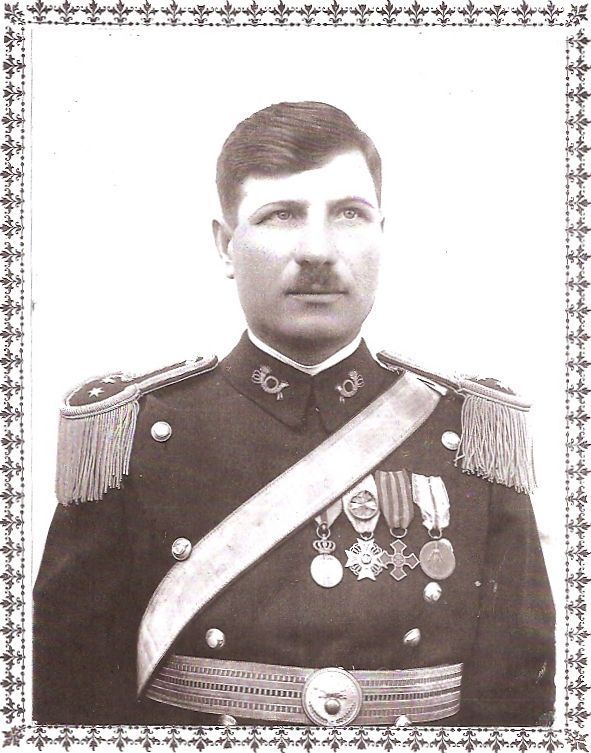

Member of the Moldavian Parliament
- In office 1917–1918

Personal details
- Born: October 25, 1894 Bădragii Vechi, Hotin, now Moldova
- Died: September 21, 1967 Balinț, Timiș, Romania
- Resting place: Balinț, Timiș, Romania
- Occupation: Captain, Romanian Army

Dumitru Mârza was a Bessarabian politician. He was born in Bădragii Vechi.

== Biography ==
He served as Member of the Moldavian Parliament (1917–1918).

== Gallery ==
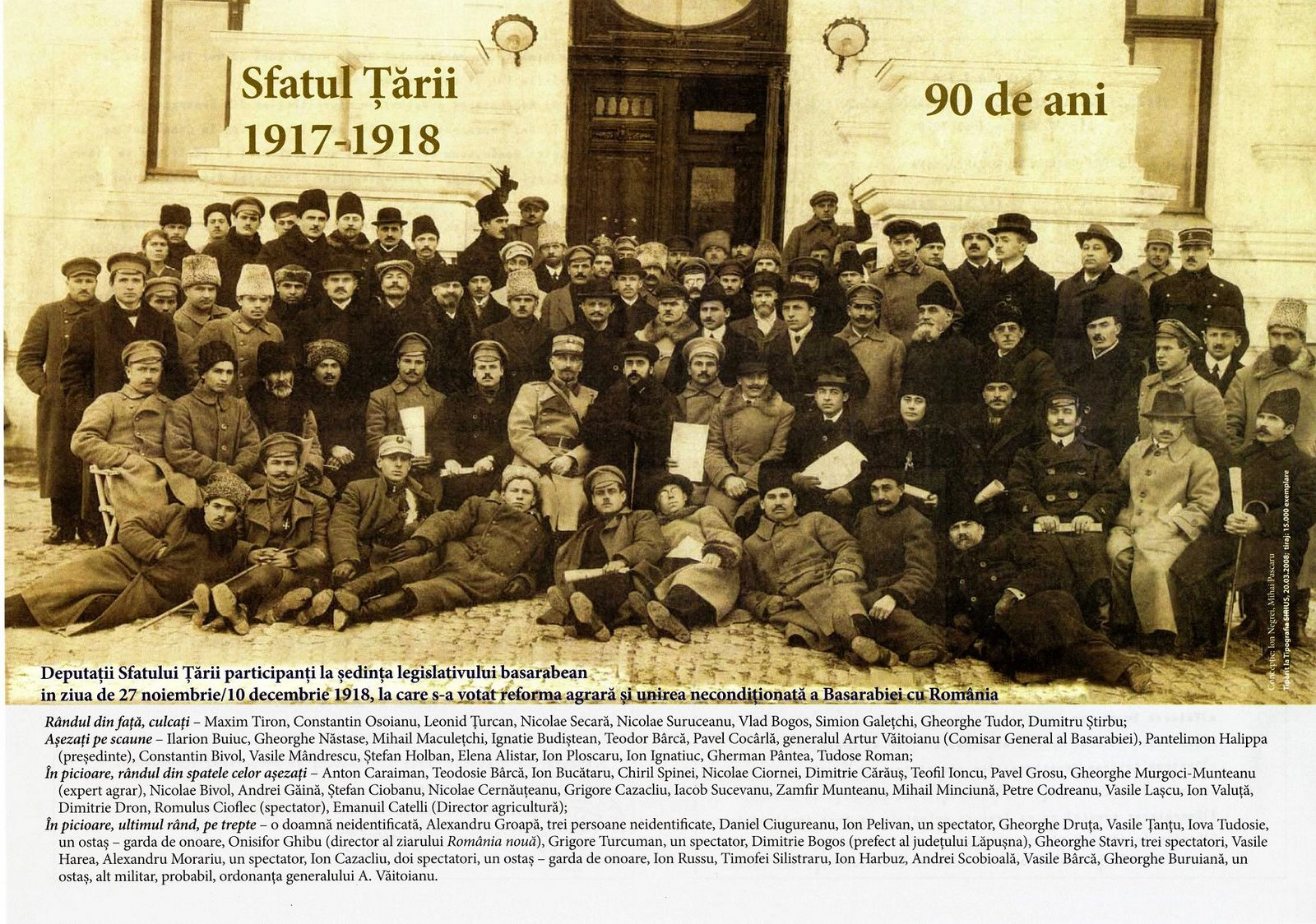
Sfatul Țării,10 December 1918

Moldovan stamp, 1998

Moldova in Europe
