= Olișcani =

- Village
- Location in Moldova
- Coordinates: 47°48′N 28°43′E
- Country: Moldova
- District: Șoldănești District

Population (2014 census)
  - Total: 2,519
- Time zone: UTC+2 (EET)
  - Summer (DST): UTC+3 (EEST)

Olișcani is a village in Șoldănești District, Moldova.

== Notable people ==
- Teofil Ioncu
