= Teofil Ioncu =

Bessarabian and Romanian politician (1885–1954)

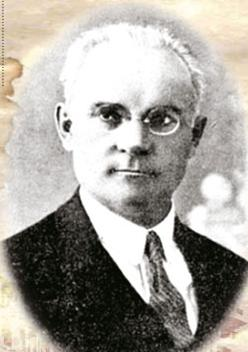

Member of the Moldovan Parliament
- In office 1917–1918

Personal details
- Born: 22 July 1885 Olișcani
- Died: 16 March 1954 (aged 68) Iași

Teofil Ioncu (22 July 1885, in Olișcani – 16 March 1954, in Iași) was a Bessarabian and Romanian politician, member of Sfatul Țării.

== Biography ==
Teofil Ioncu studied at the Moscow Higher Institute and the Higher Business School of the University of Leipzig. From 1913 to 1914 he was one of the permanent contributors to the magazine Cuvânt Moldovenesc.

== Political activity ==
On 3 April 1917 he took part in the establishment of the National Moldavian Party. On 20 May 1917 he was elected president of the first Student Congress, which has as topic of discussion the election of the National Moldavian Party. In the summer of that year he was sent as a voting delegate by NMP from Chișinău near the Verkhovna Rada to support the interests of Romanians in Bessarabia.

He served as Member of the Moldovan Parliament (1917–1918).

== Awards ==
- Order of Ferdinand I, in the grade Commander;
- Order of the Star of Romania, in the grade Officer.

== Gallery ==
Moldovan stamp, 1998

== Bibliography ==
- Gheorghe E. Cojocaru, Sfatul Țării: itinerar, Civitas, Chişinău, 1998, ISBN 9975-936-20-2
- Mihai Taşcă, Sfatul Țării şi actualele autorităţi locale, "Timpul de dimineaţă", no. 114 (849), 27 June 2008 (page 16)
