= Boldurești =

- Commune
- Location in Moldova
- Coordinates: 47°08′N 28°04′E
- Country: Moldova
- District: Nisporeni District

Population (2014)
  - Total: 3,123
- Time zone: UTC+2 (EET)
  - Summer (DST): UTC+3 (EEST)

Boldurești is a commune in Nisporeni District, Moldova. It is composed of three villages: Băcșeni, Boldurești and Chilișoaia.

== Notable people ==
- Vladimir Bogos
