= Pan Halippa =

Bessarabian and Moldovan journalist and politician (1883–1979)

Pantelimon Halippa OR
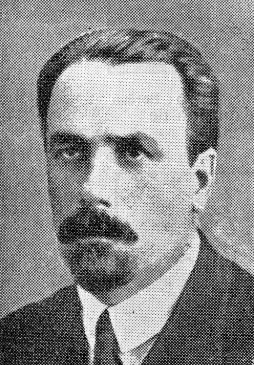

Member of the Moldovan Parliament
- In office 1917–1918

President of Sfatul Țării
- In office 25 November 1918 – 27 November 1918
- Preceded by: Constantin Stere

Minister of Public Works of Romania
- In office 6 June 1927 – 20 June 1927
- In office 10 November 1928 – 7 November 1930

Minister of Labor, Health and Social Security
- In office 13 June 1930 – 8 October 1930

Personal details
- Born: 13 August [O.S. 1 August] 1883 Cubolta, Sîngerei District, Moldova
- Died: 30 April 1979 (aged 95) Bucharest, Romania
- Resting place: Cernica Monastery
- Party: Bessarabian Peasants' Party
- Other political affiliations: Socialist Revolutionary Party; National Peasants' Party
- Spouse: Eleonora Circău
- Children: 1 son
- Education: University of Yuryev (today University of Tartu); University of Iași
- Profession: Journalist, poet, mathematician
- Parents: Nicolae and Paraschiva Halippa

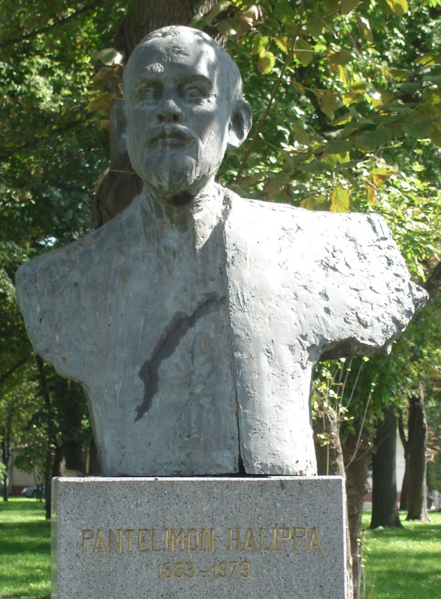
Bust of Halippa in Alba Iulia.

Pantelimon "Pan" Halippa (13 August [O.S. 1 August] 1883 – 30 April 1979) was a Bessarabian-born Romanian journalist and politician. A leading advocate of Romanian nationalism in Bessarabia and a key figure in the movement for the province’s union with Romania, he served as president of Sfatul Țării, the assembly that voted for union in 1918. Halippa later held ministerial posts in several Romanian governments before facing political persecution under the communist regime and imprisonment in Sighet Prison.

== Biography ==
Halippa was born to the poor peasants Nicolae and Paraschiva Halippa in Cubolta, then in the Russian Empire and now in Moldova's Raionul Sîngerei.

Married to the teacher Eleonora Circău, he had one son. His Chișinău home is preserved as a monument today.

=== Education ===
Pan Halippa attended primary school in his native village and then took courses at the Yedintsy Spiritual School and the Kishinev Theological Seminary. After graduating from seminary in 1904, he enrolled in the Faculty of Physics and Medicine of the University of Yuryev (today University of Tartu), but a year later the Russian Revolution of 1905 broke out and he was forced to quit university, because he was a member of the Socialist Revolutionary Party. Back in Kishinev, he became involved with young Romanian intellectuals, working on Revista Basarabia, the first Romanian-language publication in Bessarabia in that period. In its pages he printed the revolutionary hymn "Deșteaptă-te, române!", which caused the Tsarist authorities to seek his arrest.

Taking refuge in Iași, he enrolled in the Faculty of Letters and Philosophy of the University of Iași, where he took classes from 1908 to 1912. At this time he worked on the magazine Viața românească, in which he published "Scrisori din Basarabia" ("Letters from Bessarabia"). In 1908, he published Pilde și novele ("Proverbs and Novels") in Chișinău (using Cyrillic), the first Bessarabian fiction novel, while in 1912 "Basarabia, schiță geografică" ("Bessarabia, Geographic Sketch") appeared. Returning to Chișinău in 1913, he published, together with Nicolae Alexandri and with the assistance of Vasile Stroescu, the newspaper Cuvânt moldovenesc, which he directed after April 1917. He wrote unceasingly in favour of union with Romania.

== Political activity ==
Halippa's political activity intensified as the 1910s wore on and in 1917 he founded the Moldovan National Party. The year 1918 found him at the head of the unionist wave, for which he was elected first vice-president, then president of Sfatul Țării, the assembly which voted for the union of Bessarabia with Romania on 27 March 1918. He also took parts in the assemblies at Cernăuți and Alba Iulia (Great National Assembly of Alba Iulia), where, respectively, the acts of union of Bukovina and Transylvania with Romania were proclaimed.

After 1918 he held a number of government posts: Minister and Secretary of State for Bessarabia (1919–1920), Minister of Public Works (1927), Minister of Public Works and Communications (1930) interim Minister of Work, Health and Social Protection (1930), Minister Secretary of State (1928–1930, 1932, 1932–1933), senator and deputy in parliament (1918–1934). He was a member of the National Peasants' Party after its founding in 1926.

Throughout his time in office, Halippa sought to further Bessarabia's cultural development. He founded the Chișinău Popular University (1917), the Moldovan Conservatory, the Society of Bessarabian Writers and Journalists and the Luceafărul Editorial Society and Bookstore in Chișinău (1940). In 1932 he edited and headed the magazine Viața Basarabiei ("Bessarabian Life") and the eponymous daily newspaper. In 1918 Halippa was chosen corresponding member of the Romanian Academy; removed in 1948, he was restored to its ranks posthumously in 1990.

In 1950 he was arrested and imprisoned without trial at Sighet prison, in Sighetu Marmației. Two years later, at the initiative of Teohari Georgescu and Ana Pauker, he was handed over to the MGB, taken to Chișinău, tried and sentenced to 25 years' hard labour in Siberia. Brought back to Romania, he was held at Aiud until 1957.

== Death ==
He died in Bucharest in 1979 at the age of 95 and is buried in the cemetery of Cernica Monastery.

== Gallery ==
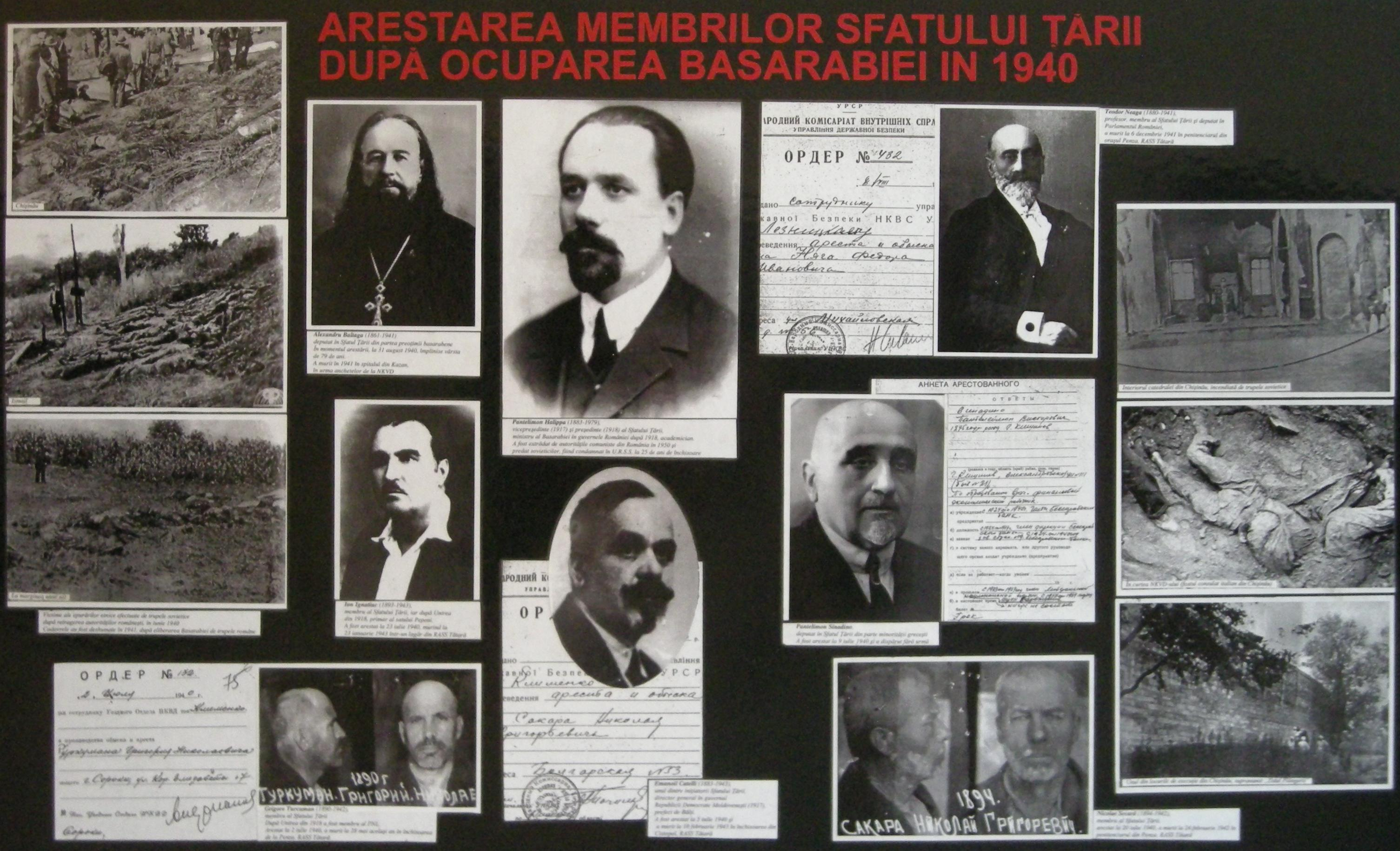

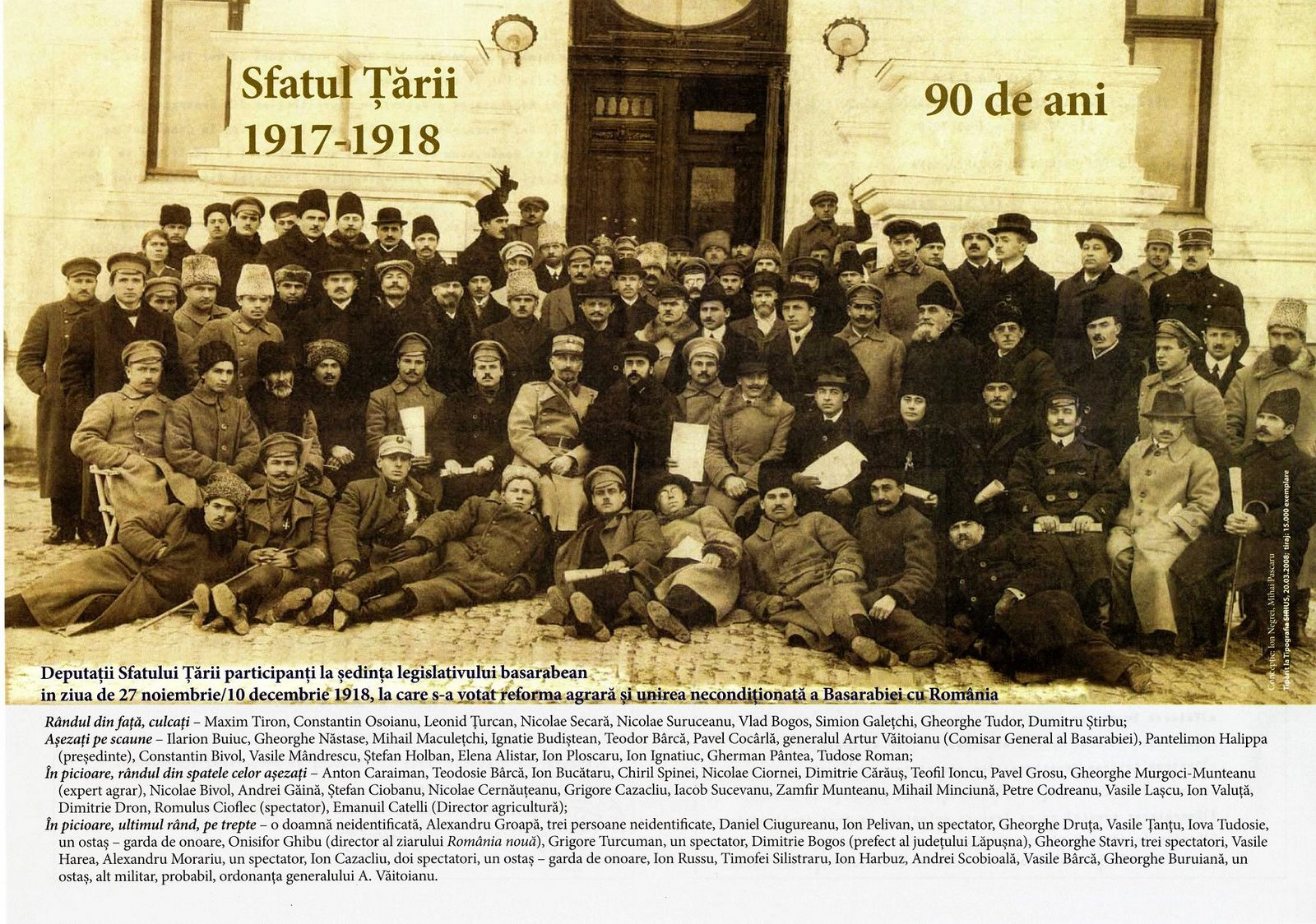
Sfatul Țării Palace, 10 December 1918

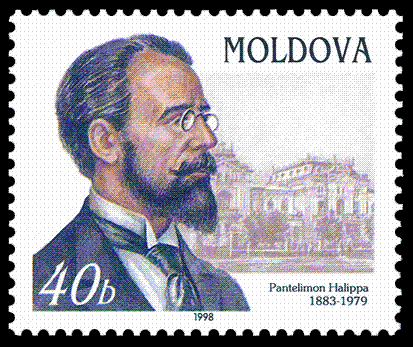
Pan Halippa and Sfatul Țării Palace

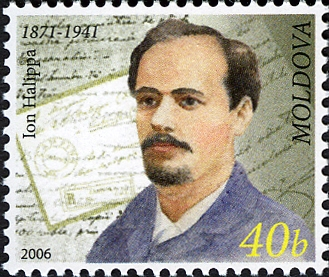
His brother Ion Halippa (1871–1941)

== Works ==
Halippa wrote over 280 poems, articles, sketches, translations and memorials, managing to edit a single volume of poetry during his lifetime: Flori de pârloagă ("Flowers of a Fallow Field", 1921, Iași), prefaced by Mihail Sadoveanu. He also wrote a few historical studies: Bessarabiâ do prisoedineniâ k Rossii ("Besarabia before Annexation to Russia") (Russian, 1914); Basarabia sub împăratul Aleksandr I (1812–1825) ("Bessarabia under Emperor Aleksandr I"), B. P. Hasdeu (1939). Posthumous works include Povestea vieții mele ("The Story of My Life", Patrimoniu, Chișinău, 1990) and a volume of newspaper writings (2001). He also collaborated on the work Testament pentru urmași ("Last Will", 1991).

== Bibliography ==
- Dorina N. Rusu, Membrii Academiei Române 1866-1999, Editura Academiei Române, Bucharest, 1999 ISBN 973-27-0696-7
- Biblioteca Națională a Republicii Moldova, "Calendar Național. 2003"
