= Ion Pelivan =

Moldovan politician

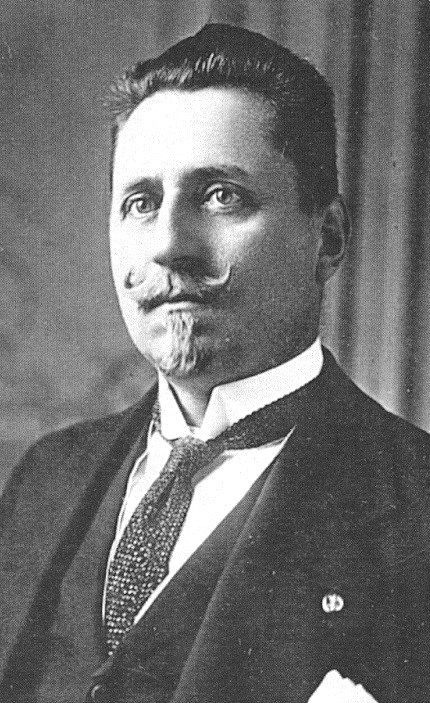

Minister of Justice of Romania
- In office 5 December 1919 – 12 March 2020
- Prime Minister: Alexandru Vaida-Voevod

Director General for Foreign Affairs
- In office 1917–1918
- President: Ion Inculeț
- Prime Minister: Pantelimon Erhan; Daniel Ciugureanu

Member of the Moldovan Parliament
- In office 1917–1918

Personal details
- Born: April 1, 1876 Răzeni, Bessarabia, Russian Empire
- Died: January 25, 1954 (aged 77) Sighet Prison, Romanian People's Republic
- Resting place: Cernica Monastery
- Party: National Moldavian Party (1917-1918); Bessarabian Peasants' Party (1918-1923); Romanian National Party (1923-1926); National Peasants' Party (1926-1938, 1940-1947); National Renaissance Front (1938-1940)
- Education: Dorpat University
- Profession: Jurist

Ion Gheorghe Pelivan (April 1, 1876 – January 25, 1954) was a Romanian politician.

He was born in Răzeni, Bessarabia, the son of Gheorghe Pelivan and his wife, Eugenia Varuh Titica. He graduated in 1898 from the Theological Seminary of Chișinău and in 1903 he received a law degree from the University of Tartu. Subsequently, he worked as jurist in Bălți.

During 1917–1918, Pelivan served as Foreign Minister of the Moldavian Democratic Republic in the Pantelimon Erhan Cabinet and the Daniel Ciugureanu Cabinet.

He was arrested in May 1950 by the Romanian communist authorities and sent to Sighet Prison in Sighetu Marmației, where he died in 1954. He is buried at Cernica Monastery in Pantelimon, Ilfov.

A street in the Buiucani Sector of Chișinău was named in his honor, and the theoretical high school in the village where he was born, Răzeni, Ialoveni District, bears his name. The village Pelivan in Orhei District, Moldova was named after him in 1932.
