= Nicolae Alexandri =

Bessarabian politician (1859–1931)

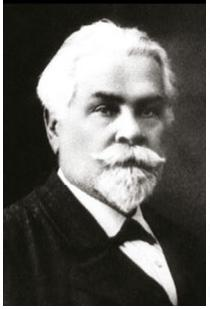
- Alexandri in 1920

Member of the Moldovan Parliament
- In office 1917–1918

Member of the Chamber of Deputies of Romania

Vicepresident of the Chamber of Deputies of Romania

Personal details
- Born: 17 May 1859 Chişinău, Bessarabia Governorate
- Died: 17 November 1931 (aged 72) Chişinău, Kingdom of Romania
- Education: Saint Petersburg State University

Nicolae N. Alexandri (17 May 1859 – 17 November 1931) was a Bessarabian politician.

== Biography ==
Nicolae N. Alexandri graduated from Saint Petersburg State University. He was the first editor in chief of Cuvânt moldovenesc.

Nicolae N. Alexandri served as Member of the Moldovan Parliament (1917-1918). On 4 December [O.S. 21 November] 1917 Sfatul Țării opened as the first parliament of the autonomous Bessarabia. In the front of the hall, the elder of the delegates, Nicolae N. Alexandri took the place of the president of the session.

== Gallery ==
Moldovan stamp, 1998

== Bibliography ==
- Gheorghe E. Cojocaru, Sfatul Țării: itinerar, Civitas, Chişinău, 1998, ISBN 9975-936-20-2
- Mihai Taşcă, Sfatul Țării şi actualele autorităţi locale, "Timpul de dimineaţă", no. 114 (849), June 27, 2008 (page 16)
