= Gerasimovich =

Gerasimovich may refer to:

- Boris Gerasimovich
- 2126 Gerasimovich
- Gerasimovich (crater)
