= Pahlen =

European noble family

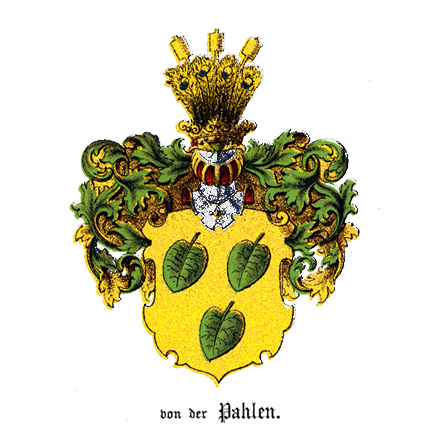
Original arms of the family

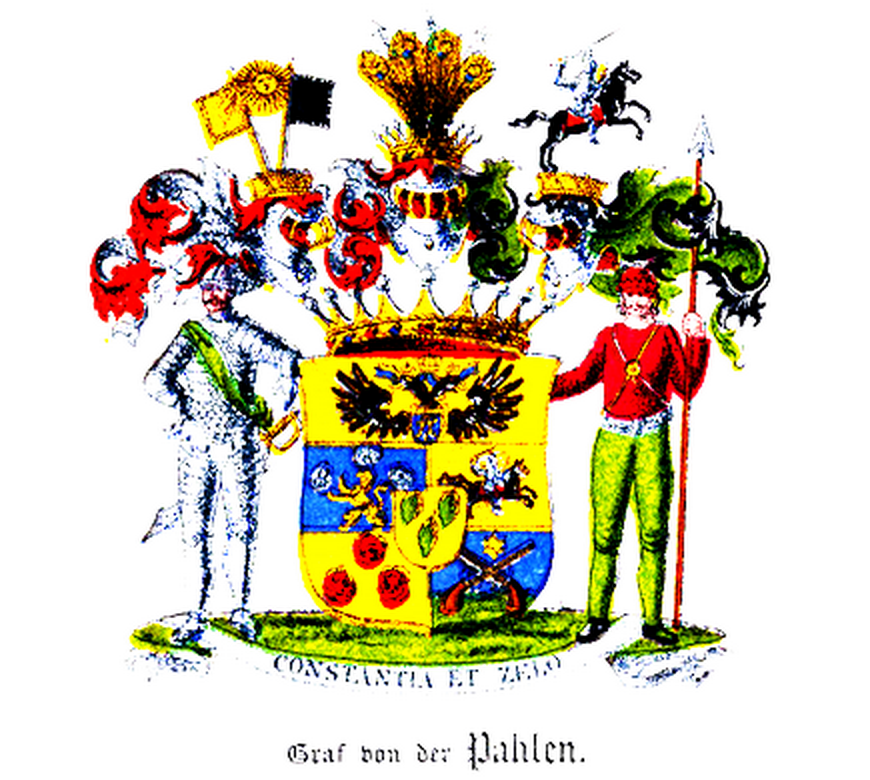
Comital arms of the family

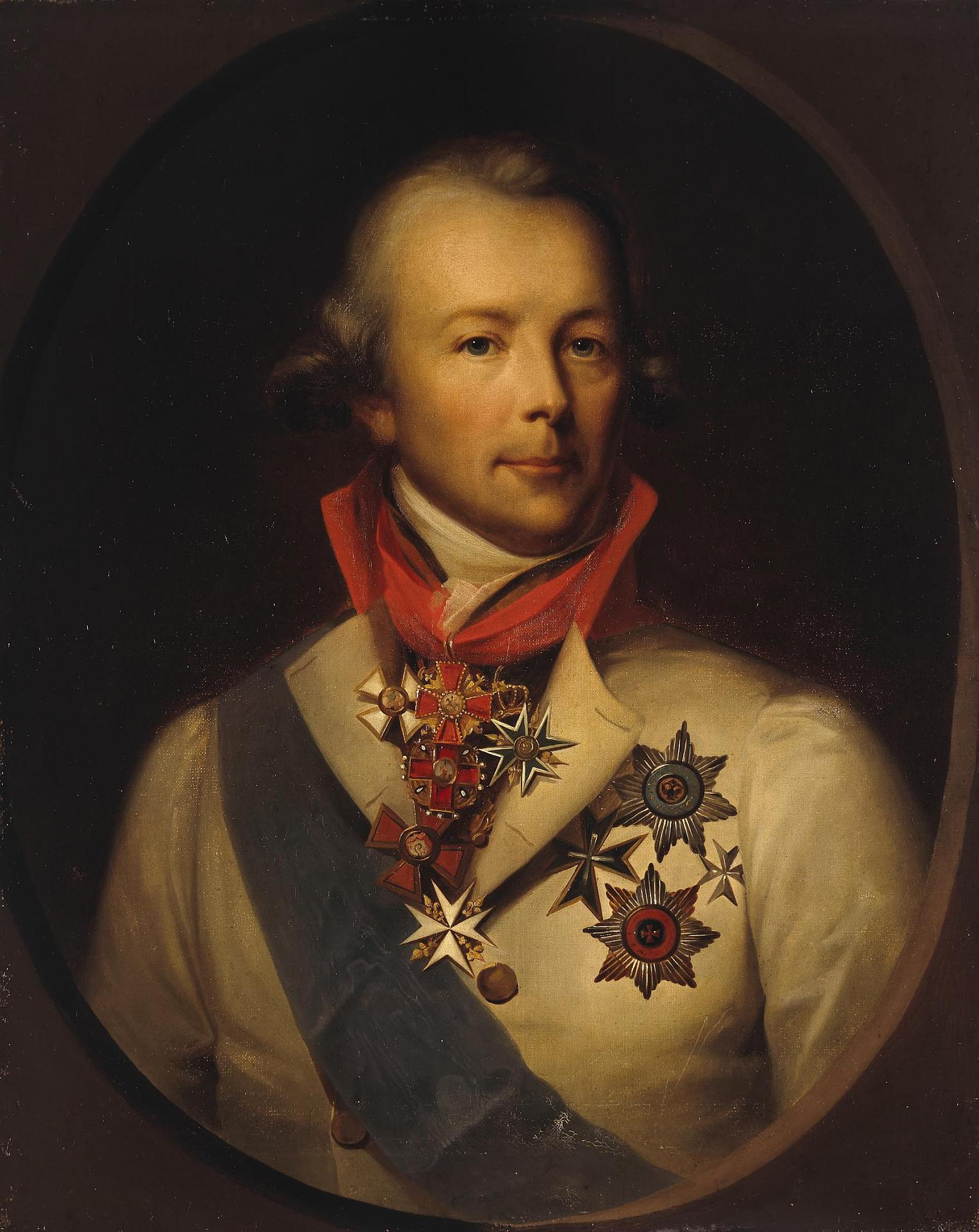
Count Peter Ludwig von der Pahlen

The House of Pahlen (German: von der Pahlen; Russian: Пален, Palen) is an old German, Estonian, Russian, Lithuanian, Swedish and Baltic German noble family of Pomeranian origin.

== History ==
The family probably originated from Pomerania, but in the beginning of the 15th century moved to Livonia. The first historical account of this family dates to 1290, when Johannes de Pala was Vogt at Turaida.

On 18 September 1679, Charles XI of Sweden granted a barony to five brothers of the family and all their descendants. In 1799, Emperor Paul I of Russia gave Peter Ludwig von der Pahlen and all of his descendants the rank of count.

By a decision of the Russian Empire in 1755 and 1865, most of the other members of the Pahlen family received the Russian baronial rank. Members of the branches with Russian baronial titles also live in Sweden, and they form part of the unintroduced nobility.

== Notable family members ==
- Count Peter Ludwig von der Pahlen (Pyotr Alexeyevich, 1745–1826), Russian courtier, organizer of the assassination of Paul I of Russia
  - Count Peter Johann Christoph von der Pahlen (Pyotr Petrovich; 1778–1864), Russian General of Cavalry, hero of the Patriotic War of 1812, Russo-Turkish War, 1828-1829 and the campaign against the November Uprising in Poland; son of Peter Ludwig
  - Count Friedrich Alexander von der Pahlen (Fyodor Petrovich; 1780–1863), Russian diplomat, Governor-General of Novorossiya, and Plenipotentiary President of the Divans in the Danubian Principalities; son of Pyotr Alexeyevich
  - Count Paul Karl Ernst Wilhelm Philipp von der Pahlen (Pavel Petrovich, 1775–1834), Russian General of Cavalry, hero of the Patriotic War of 1812; son of Paul Ludwig
- Baron Hans von der Palen (1740–1817), colonel, Russian statesman; brother of Pyotr Alexeyvich
  - Baron Carl Magnus von der Palen (Matvey Ivanovich, 1776–1863), Major-General of Cavalry, hero of the Patriotic War of 1812
- Baron Arend Dietrich von der Pahlen (1738–1778), Russian military officer, friend of Mikhail Lermontov
- Count Magnus Konstantin Ferdinand von der Pahlen (Konstantin Ivanovich; 1833–1912), Russian statesman, hero of the Siege of Sevastopol (1854–1855), Pskov governor, Russian minister for justice (1867–1878); grandson of Pyotr Alexeyevich
  - Count Konstantin Johann Georg von der Pahlen (Konstantin Konstantinovich; 1861–1923), statesman, Privy Councillor, senator, Governor of Vilnius
- Count Alexis Friedrich Leonid von der Pahlen (Aleksei Petrovich; 1874–1938), Russian Lieutenant-General, White movement officer under Nikolai Nikolaevich Yudenich
- Emanuel von der Pahlen (4 July 1882 – 18 July 1952), astronomer with a lunar crater named after him

== Literature ==
- Walter Riccius, Schlösser und Gärten. Das Gut Palmse und seine Akteure, GRIN-Verlag München 2026, ISBN Nr. 978-3-38917-137-0;
- "Пален, графский и баронский род" . Brockhaus and Efron Encyclopedic Dictionary (in Russian). 1906.
