= Houzeau (crater) =

Lunar impact crater

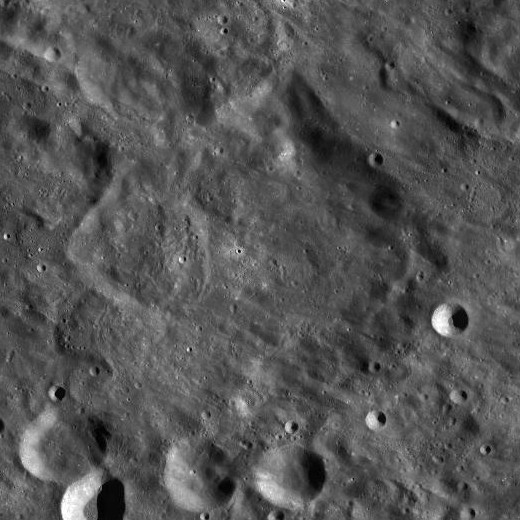
- LRO WAC image
- Coordinates: 17.1°S 123.5°W
- Diameter: 71 km
- Depth: Unknown
- Colongitude: 125° at sunrise
- Eponym: J.-C. Houzeau

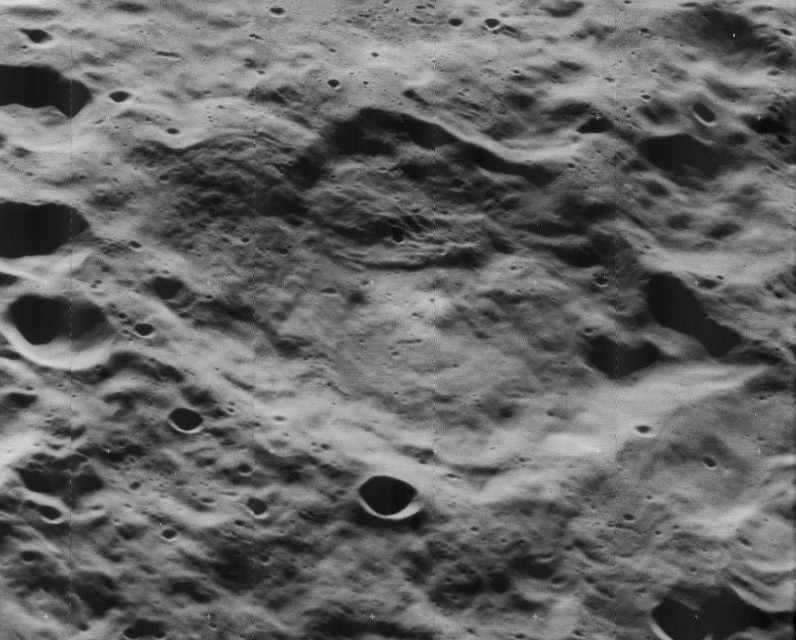
Lunar Orbiter 5 image

Houzeau is a lunar impact crater on the far side of the Moon. It is located to the northwest of the Mare Orientale impact basin, and ejecta from that event has fallen across this crater rim and its interior. To the south of Houzeau lies the crater Gerasimovich, and one crater diameter to the west is Belopol'skiy. To the northwest lies Fridman, with Ioffe to its southwest.

The perimeter of this crater forms a slightly irregular circle, with an outward bulge along the northern side and smaller bulges to the west. The satellite craters Houzeau P and Houzeau Q are attached to the southern exterior. Along the eastern edge is a small crater along the rim. A few tiny craterlets lie within the somewhat irregular interior.

== Satellite craters ==
By convention these features are identified on lunar maps by placing the letter on the side of the crater midpoint that is closest to Houzeau.

Houzeau	Latitude	Longitude	Diameter
P	19.7° S	125.0° W	25 km
Q	19.0° S	124.7° W	18 km
