= Donici (surname) =

Donici is a Romanian surname used in both Romania and Moldova, and generally tied to a boyar family of ancient Moldavia. Figures with this name include:

- Alecu Donici (1806–1865), Moldavian, later Romanian poet and translator
- Matei Donici (1847–1921), Bessarabian poet, general, and politician
- Nicolae Donici (1874–1960), Bessarabian-born Romanian astronomer who settled in France
- Conon Arămescu-Donici (1837–1922), Moldavian Metropolitan-Primate of the Romanian Orthodox Church
