= Moldavian Progressive Party =

Moldavian Progressive Party Partidul Progresist Moldovenesc
- President: Emanoil Catelli
- Co-chairman: Nicolae Ciornei
- Founded: March/April 1917
- Dissolved: c. July 1917
- Merged into: National Moldavian Party
- Headquarters: 95 Bolshaya Arnautskaya and 159 Nezhinskaya, Odesa, Kherson Governorate, Russian Provisional Government
- Ideology: Left-wing nationalism (Romanian); Progressivism; Agrarianism; Nativism; Protectionism
- Political position: Left-wing
- Colors: Blue, Yellow, Red (Romanian tricolor)

Party flag

The Moldavian Progressive Party (Romanian: Partidul Progresist Moldovenesc, PPM, or Partidul Moldovenesc Progresist, Russian: Молдавская Прогрессивная Партия, Ukrainian: Молдовська Прогресивна Партія) was a short-lived political organization advancing the political interests of Romanians and "Moldavians". It nominally represented the region of Bessarabia, but was primarily active in Odesa, in the Russian Provisional Government's Kherson Governorate. Its core constituency was a large group of Romanian-speaking soldiers in the Russian Army; it was also closely aligned with the older National Moldavian Party (PNM) of Chișinău, though it advanced some left-wing policies that were entirely its own.

The PPM was established some weeks after the February Revolution of 1917, after efforts made by Emanoil Catelli. The circumstances of its creation are debated, though, by all accounts, its creation involved networking with political leaders from Bessarabia and the Kingdom of Romania. Catelli served as the party's first and only chairman; Nicolae Ciornei was his right-hand man. Their commitment to progressivism, and economic focus on agrarianism, reflected the will of its constituency, made up of soldiers with a peasant background. As such, the group's advocacy of land reform was not fully welcomed by the PNM, which never included it in its (otherwise almost identical) statutes. Both groups took up Romanian nationalism, supporting ethnic autonomy within a democratic Russia, and also issuing a set of nativist demands. Catelli rejected the notion that Moldavians were anything more than a subgroup of the Romanians, and advocated concrete measures to overturn Russification.

The PPM became highly visible in Odesan society during the Labor Day celebrations, when, with support from the PNM, it reportedly became the largest of the factions marching at Kulykove Pole. In parallel, it began a process of merging into the PNM. It remained active as the latter's section inside the Ukrainian People's Republic, a regime which it rejected—advocating instead for continued union with the Russian Republic. The region's political future was left in question after the October Revolution; Catelli himself made his way back into Bessarabia, becoming a founding figure of a polity called "Moldavian Democratic Republic". In 1918, this state united with Romania, and Catelli emerged as a Romanian politician, aligned with the National Liberals.

== History ==
=== Creation ===
The February Revolution created space for democratic self-rule, and for national emancipation among the various ethnic groups of the Russian Empire. As noted by journalist Hristea Dăscălescu, this reversed a trend toward Russification, which had been particularly intense in the Bessarabia Governorate; here, a Romanian population, colloquially known as "Moldavians", bordered the Romanian Kingdom, which was essentially a "free state". According to an overview by the scholar Vitalie Ciobanu, the instability of World War I and its patterns of mass conscription resulted in as many as 100,000 Bessarabian recruits being transferred to Odesa, just east of Bessarabia, whereas Chișinău, the Governorate's capital, was garrisoned by men from elsewhere in the Empire. As Ciobanu notes, this fact, coupled with the still-unchallenged ascendancy of Russian conservatism in Chișinău, made it more likely that a youthful political movement would be formed in Odesa, rather than inside Bessarabia.

The PPM was formed around Catelli, who was serving in Russian uniform on the Romanian Front. He had been elected a leader of Odesa's National Moldavian Committee, after helping to establish the first Moldavian soldiers-and-students' soviets. From March 1917, he and some fifty comrades began meeting in Odesa as the party's initiative committee, also sending a letter to the Provisional Government in Petrograd, asking for the recognition of national rights in Bessarabia. Though he rejected accusations that he was fostering separatism, Catelli had fully embraced the tenets of Romanian nationalism. His manifestos proclaimed that "Moldavian" was a degrading Russian exonym for the eastern Romanians, and that the time had come for those designated under this name to "take back what the rascals have stolen from us."

Onisifor Ghibu, a doyen of the nationalist movement in both Bessarabia and Transylvania, spent early 1917 in Odesa, and met with Catelli, calling him "a very good Romanian man", though noting that his excessive enthusiasm got in the way of organizing things. Another figure of importance in the PPM's creation was Praporshchik Nicolae Ciornei. He had organized the Moldavian Committee of the 40th Infantry Reserve Regiment, and had signed on as a co-leader of the party. By 23 March, the meetings involved Ion Păscăluță, on behalf of the soldiers' soviet, with Ghibu, Sergiu Victor Cujbă and Pan Halippa representing the wider nationalist movement. Joining them were three Odesa University students, namely Sebastian Ceapă, Maria Gheorghiu, and Anatolie Maimași. Păscăluță's memoirs claim that he was selected to preside over the sessions, and that he was the one to propose a massive rally of the Romanian nationalists in Odesa, initially scheduled for 3 May. The idea was endorsed by Catelli and Halippa, though they disagreed on how to involve the local churches. Catelli allegedly proposed that Ioan Levizor of Balta, who had created a breakaway Inochentist church, be employed as a propagandist; this notion irritated Halippa, who recommended a more conservative approach.

=== Labor Day rally ===
Catelli won more support for his project to establish a Romanian-language printing enterprise and crash courses in literary Romanian, with the goal of creating a network of teachers. He was especially keen on printing a Romanian–Russian dictionary by Emanuil Grigorovitza, as well as nationalist propaganda songs, primarily those authored in Transylvania by George Coșbuc—he had picked these up from the Romanian Volunteer Corps in Russia. On 29 March, Ciornei visited all garrisons comprising Moldavian soldiers, addressing them in their native language about the political effort being undertaken. Ciobanu argues that the PPM had its inaugural session on 30 March 1917, initially as the "Moldavian Progressive Party of the Bessarabian Officers and Soldiers" (Partidul Progresist Moldovenesc al Ofițerilor și Soldaților Basarabeni); Catelli was voted in as chairman of the Organizing Committee, which was headquartered at 95 Bolshaya Arnautskaya Street. This account is backed by Ghibu, who notes that the PPM actually closely predated the PNM, at least as an intellectual project. Catelli received input from Ghibu himself, as well as from the senior Bessarabian Vasile Stroescu, and from Ioan Pangal, an envoy from Romania. Both Ghibu and Stroescu tried to persuade Catelli that he should label his group "simply 'national', and not 'progressive'". In his own narrative, the PNM's Petre Cazacu refers to the group as a "national Moldavian party in Odesa", reporting that its 18th-member executive committee, headed by Catelli, also included Vasile Gafencu, Constantin Osoianu, and Andrei Murafa. At that time, the PPM had moved to a new address, namely 159 Nezhinskaya Street.

In Dăscălescu's version, the PPM was established as an Odesa offshoot of the PNM, during the Soldiers' Congress of 18 April (some nine days after the PNM's own establishment at Chișinău). This date was also the Old-Style version of Labor Day, which saw between 12,000 and 60,000 Bessarabians marching in celebration at Kulykove Pole. Participants demanded Bessarabian autonomy, and agreed on principle to support the PNM's platform. As recounted by Cazacu, the march, personally handled by Catelli, impressed members of other political groups. These were small and "disorganized", waving various versions of the red flag, whereas the Bessarabians formed a single mass, carrying Romanian tricolors (also present on their lapels). The rally was partly instigated by the PNM, who sent in Matei Donici, a retired Russian army general, to help organize it; he was scheduled to speak in front of the soldiers, using a text drafted for him by Ghibu and Halippa. Halippa eventually showed up instead, and spoke in front of the PPM crowds; Donici, still associated with the movement, is believed to have joined the PPM itself during or after the demonstration.

Also on 19 April, a meeting of "all the [Romanian] national political organizations in Odesa" signed on to the PNM platform, during a session presided upon by Halippa and Gheorghe Buruiană. In the end, the PPM and the PNM publicized near-identical platforms, codified as ten points: popular sovereignty; political autonomy within Russia; the establishment of a Bessarabian parliament called Sfatul Țării; nativism and linguistic rights in the administration; language education; a "Moldavian"-centered Metropolis of Bessarabia; a ban on the migrations of Moldavians from Bessarabia; concurrently, a ban on other ethnicities being colonized into Bessarabia; protectionism and fiscal localism; full equality under the law for the Romanians in Ukraine. The PPM's version included various tweaks and additions—its program called for an imperative mandate for Sfatul members, for a democracy in the episcopal polity, for progressive tax, and, under point eight, for an extensive (if compensated) land reform, redistributing among the peasants all land above 100 dessiatins. The latter policy had been only vaguely supported by the PNM, which had qualms about alienating Romanian landowners. Ciobanu writes that "the Odesans were more radical on this issue"; some PPM cadres were pushing for the gentry to have all its land confiscated, with no compensation to them. Similarly, Cazacu recounts that the PPM could not help but be leftist on this issue, since most of its intended supporters were peasants in uniform. He reports that some of those witnessing the Labor Day rally were disappointed—some resented the "agrarian radicalism" on display, while others did not appreciate the PPM's nationalism.

=== PNM merger and posterity ===
On 4 May, Catelli and Iustin Frățiman co-signed a letter to Matvey Skobelev of the Petrograd Soviet, demanding formal recognition to the Romanian nationality as living within the old borders of "historic Dacia". The letter also referred to Romania's alliance with Russia, within the Allies, as having rescued much of Ukraine from being taken by the Central Powers. The Odesa group continued to exist as a distinct entity for a while, with Catelli serving on the enlarged Committee of Bessarabians, chaired by Osoianu; on 21 May, when it demanded authorization to celebrate "the day of Bessarabia's union with Russia" (seen by Ciobanu as a "diplomatic ruse" on Catelli's part), the group was already describing itself as a local committee of the PNM. On 16 July, the group, again calling itself "national Moldavian party", reacted against the newly established Ukrainian People's Republic, which had announced its intention of annexing Bessarabia. A letter of protest, declaring the PPM's loyalty to the Russian Provisional Government, was presented by Catelli to the Central Executive Committee of the Soviets. In August, Catelli scored a moral victory when he persuaded the Odesan garrison to form Moldavian-only units, with the Committee now recognized as representing all Romanian soldiers serving under the Russian flag.

A Sfatul was eventually established and recognized in September by the newly proclaimed Russian Republic. The October Revolution precipitated moves toward Bessarabian independence, leading to the establishment of a self-ruling Moldavian Democratic Republic, centered on Chișinău. Making his way to that city, Catelli organized, on 20 October, the Moldavian Congress, which coalesced national resistance against the perceived threat of Bolshevism; in December, he became a commander in the Moldavian Army's cavalry detachment. The new republican government structure, headed by Cazacu, employed Catelli as its Director for Internal Affairs. He served as such between 10 April and 12 December 1918, with his tenure witnessing Romania's military intervention in Bessarabia, and then the union of Bessarabia with Romania. The Greater Romanian state employed Catelli in several official functions; he also joined the nationwide National Liberal Party, which he represented in the Senate of Romania. This interval was ended in mid-1940 by a Soviet occupation of Bessarabia. Catelli was caught by the NKVD at Bălți, and then dispatched to the Gulag, dying in Sverdlovsk in 1943.
