= Nicolae Donici =

Romanian astronomer

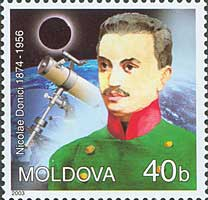
- 2003 stamp of Moldova
- Born: September 13, 1874; Chișinău, Bessarabia Governorate, Russian Empire
- Died: 1960; Paris, France
- Education: Odesa University
- Spouse: Maria Perks
- Parent(s): Nicolae A. Donici, Limonia Macri
- Scientific career
- Fields: Astronomy
- Workplaces: Astronomical Observatory in Dubăsarii Vechi
- Doctoral advisor: Aleksandr Kononovich

Nicolae N. Donici (Romanian pronunciation: [nikoˈla.e ˈdonit͡ʃʲ]; 13 September [O.S. 1 September] 1874 – 1960) was a Romanian astronomer born in Bessarabia.

He was born into an old family of Romanian nobles from Bessarabia in the Petricani district of Chișinău, the son of Nicolae A. Donici and Limonia Macri, a descendant of Alecu Donici and a relative of Matei Donici. After attending the Richelieu Lyceum in Odesa, he graduated from Odesa University. Subsequently, he served as state clerk in Saint Petersburg, Russia. Concomitantly, he had his own private observatory. He conducted research in countries such as Spain, Russia, Portugal, Indonesia, Egypt, Turkey, Algeria, and the United States. He was an honorary member of the Romanian Academy and doctor honoris causa of the University of Heidelberg and of the Coimbra Institute in Portugal. His main scientific interest were the Sun and its eclipses, planetary astronomy, and zodiacal light. The main astronomical instrument in Dubăsarii Vechi in the interwar period was a big spectroheliograph, which allowed to make first class photographs of the Sun and study the spectra of the Sun. Some American historians contend that Donitch, being close to some governmental circles in Saint Petersburg before 1917, particularly to the Obolensky family, which was close to the Czar family, was implied in public diplomacy in order to convince Nationalist circles in Egypt to liberate it from colonial occupation by the Ottoman Empire. The Astronomical Observatory in Dubăsarii Vechi (Bessarabia), directed by Donici enjoyed a number of astronomers from everywhere, including Emanuel von der Pahlen from Germany and the Russian emigrants Lev Ocoulitch and Andrei Baikov. During the interwar period, the observatory in Dubăsarii Vechi served also as a meteorological station which sent regularly reports to Central Institute of Meteorology in Bucharest. The main meteorologist was Nina Gouma.

Donici was a member of the International Union for Solar research, of the International Astronomical Union (since its first Congress in 1922), of the Romanian Academy (since 1922). In 1948 he was excluded from the Academy by communist authorities of Romania. He took refuge in Nice, France, where he continued to work in collaboration with Henri Chrétien and other French astronomers. In 1991 he was reestablished to the Romanian Academy. The place and date of death of Donici were established by Magda Stavinschi in collaboration with the French astronomer Françoise Le Guet Tully He was married to Maria Perks. The asteroid 9494 Donici is named after him. His most important publications were signed as Donitch.
