= Dubăsarii Vechi =

- Village
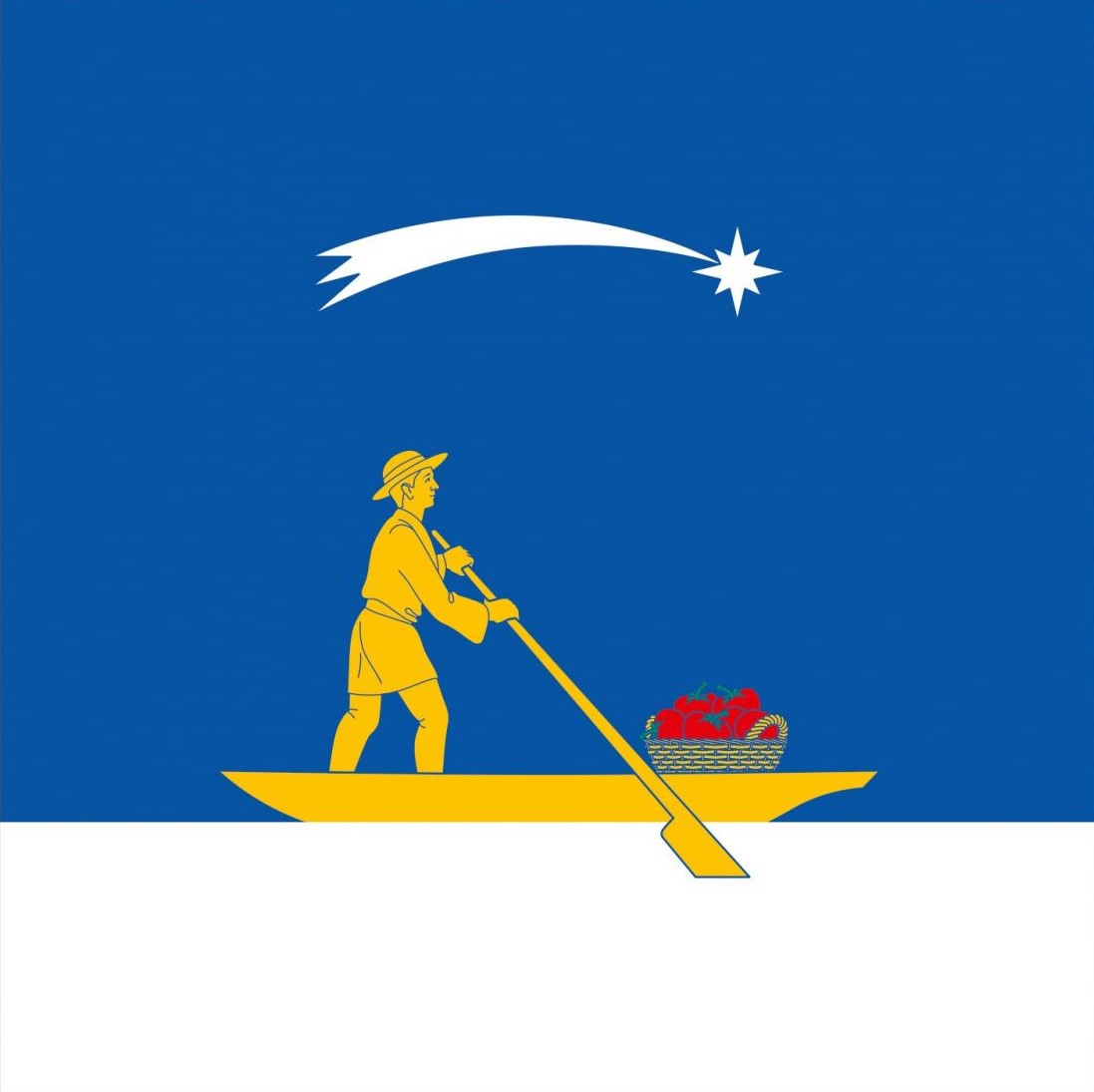
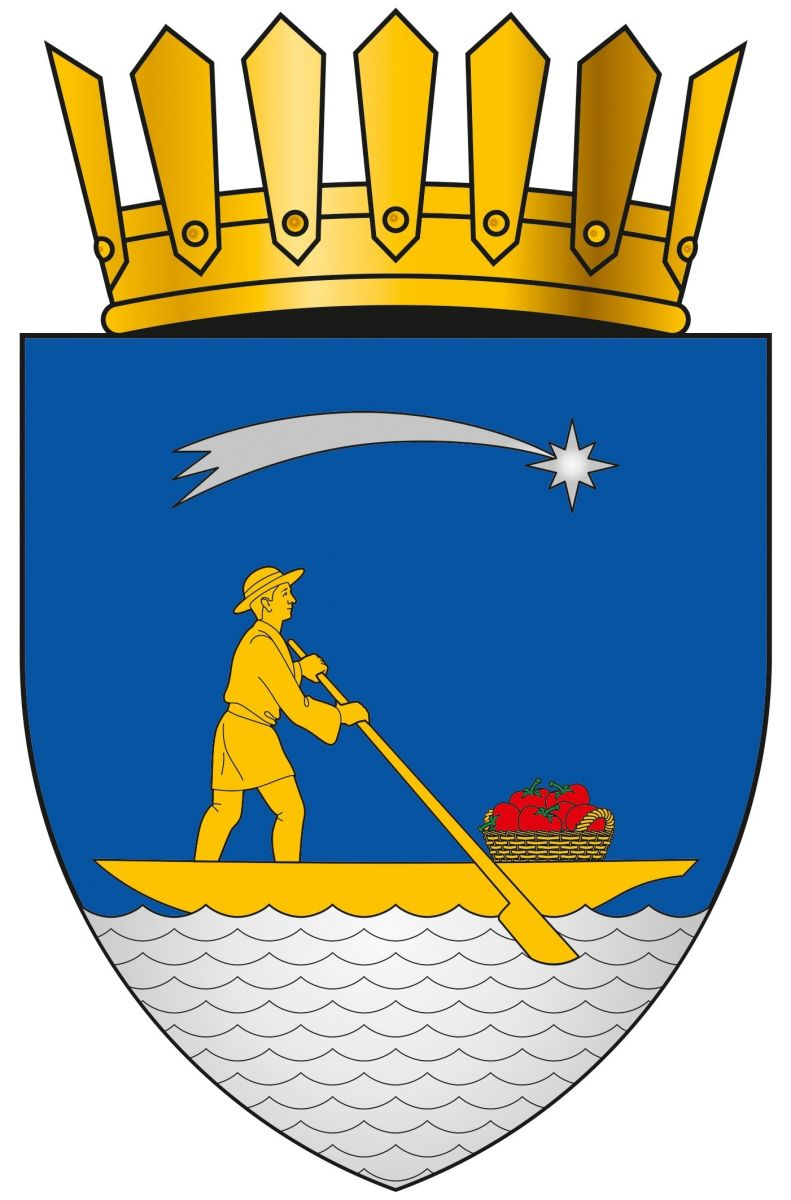
- Flag Seal

- Location in Moldova
- Coordinates: 47°08′N 29°12′E
- Country: Moldova
- District: Criuleni District
- Elevation: 75 ft (23 m)

Population (2014 census)
  - Total: 5,922
- Time zone: UTC+2 (EET)
  - Summer (DST): UTC+3 (EEST)
- Postal code: MD-4822
- Area code: +373 248
- Website: https://dubasariivechi.md/

Dubăsarii Vechi (lit. 'Old Dubăsarii' is a village in Criuleni District, Moldova.

== History ==
In 1908, Nicolae Donici established a private astronomical observatory in his village of Dubăsarii Vechi. The astronomical observatory in Dubăsarii Vechi directed by Donici enjoyed a number of astronomers from everywhere: the German: Emanuel von der Pahlen, the Russian emigrants: Lev Ocoulitch and Andrei Baikov.

== Notable people ==
- Nicolae Donici
- Haralambie Corbu
- Iura Luncașu

== Gallery ==
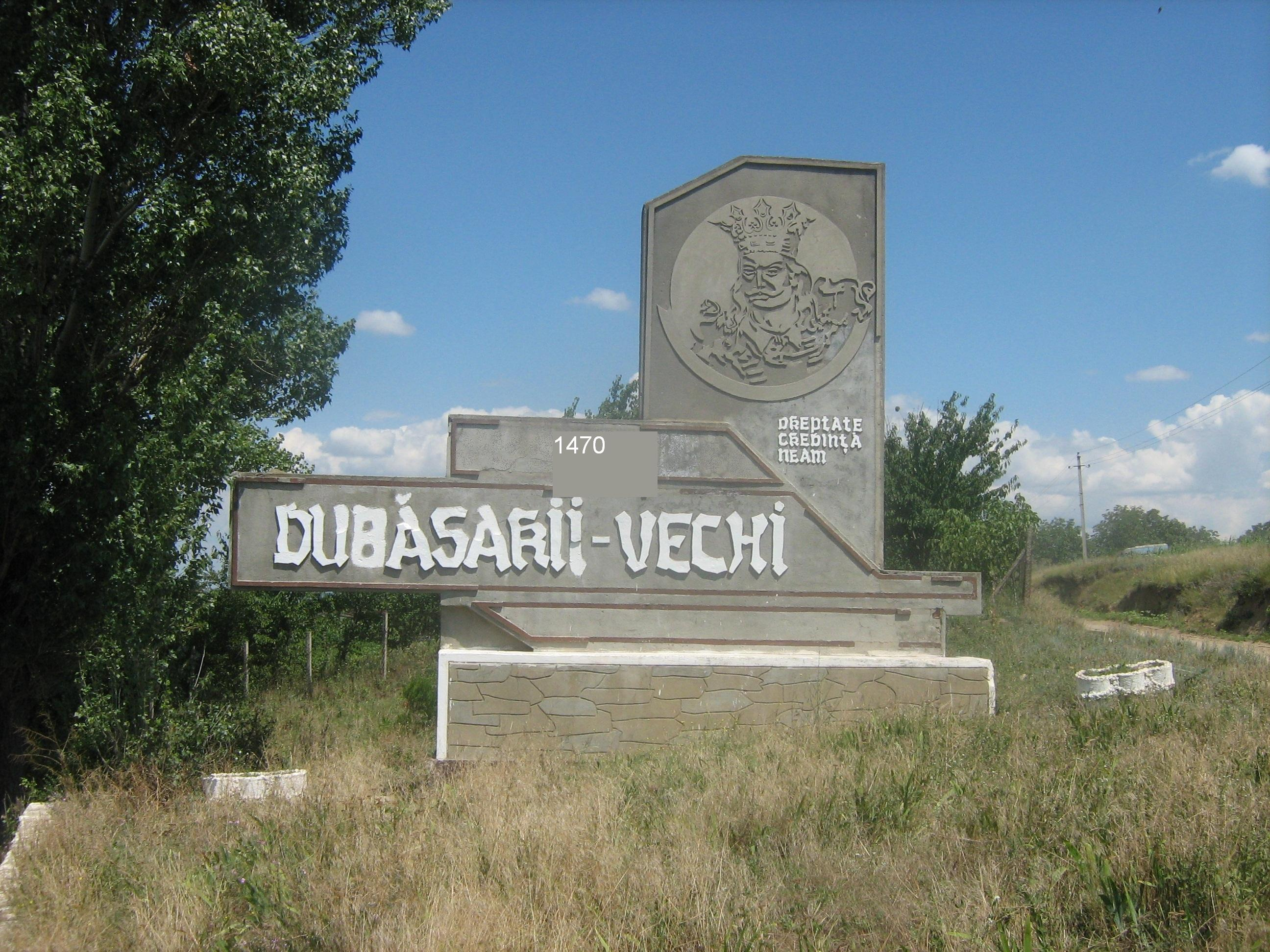
Dubăsarii Vechi city limit

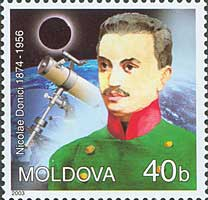
The astronomical observatory in Dubăsarii Vechi appears to the right of Donici
