= Strömgren (crater) =

Crater on the Moon

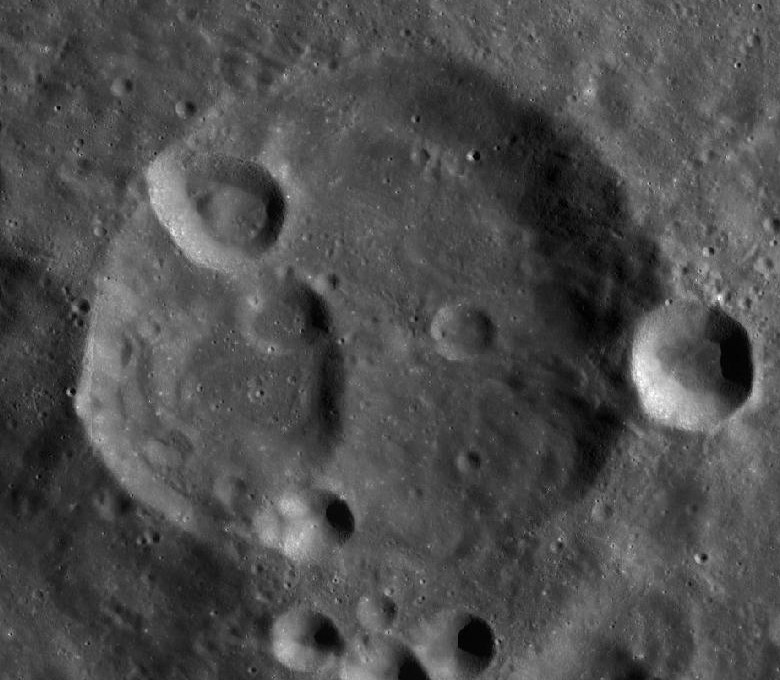
- LRO WAC image
- Coordinates: 21.7°S 132.4°W
- Diameter: 61 km
- Depth: Unknown
- Colongitude: 133° at sunrise
- Eponym: S. Elis Strömgren

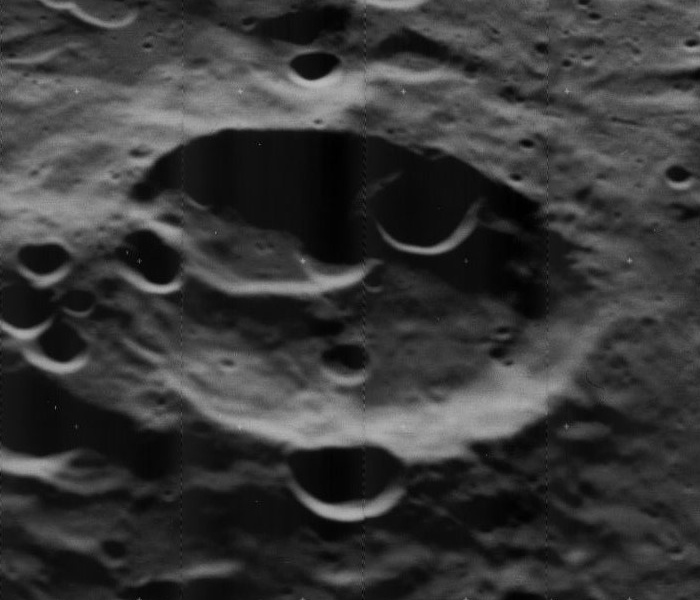
Oblique Lunar Orbiter 5 image

Strömgren is a lunar impact crater that is located on the far side of the Moon from the Earth. It lies less than one crater diameter to the north-northeast of Von der Pahlen. Farther to the east is Gerasimovich, and to the north-northeast is Belopol'skiy.

This is a worn and eroded crater formation, with several small craters along the rim edge. The outer rim is not quite circular, with outward bulges to the southeast, southwest, and north-northeast. A small crater is attached to the exterior along the east, and another overlies the inner wall to the northwest. Another small crater lies along the southern rim, and a cluster of small craters lies just outside the southern rim. The interior floor of Strömgren is somewhat uneven, with a low, curved ridge running northward from the southern edge.

== Satellite craters ==
By convention these features are identified on lunar maps by placing the letter on the side of the crater midpoint that is closest to Strömgren.

Strömgren	Latitude	Longitude	Diameter
A	17.8° S	131.7° W	51 km
X	17.4° S	134.6° W	42 km
