= Boris Gerasimovich =

Russian and Soviet astronomer and astrophysicist

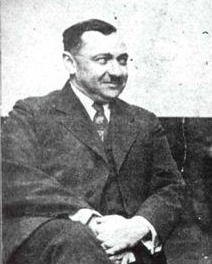
Boris Gerasimovich in 1926

Boris Petrovich Gerasimovich (Ukrainian: Бори́с Петро́вич Герасимо́вич; 19 March [O.S. 7 March] 1889, Kremenchuk – 30 November 1937) was a Soviet astronomer and astrophysicist.

== Biography ==
Gerasimovich was born in Kremenchuk (now in Poltava Oblast, Ukraine). As a student he was a member of the SR Combat Organization. He graduated from Kharkiv University in 1914 having studied under Aristarkh Belopolsky. From 1917 until 1933 he worked at the Kharkiv University observatory. He became the director of the Pulkovo Observatory in 1933, but was arrested and executed during the Great Purge. He had a daughter, Tatiana Borisovna Gerasimovich.

The crater Gerasimovich on the Moon is named in his honor. A minor planet 2126 Gerasimovich discovered in 1970 by Soviet astronomer Tamara Mikhailovna Smirnova is also named after him.
