= Ivancea =

- Commune
- Location in Moldova
- Coordinates: 47°17′N 28°51′E
- Country: Moldova
- District: Orhei District
- Elevation: 469 ft (143 m)

Population (2014)
  - Total: 5,032
- Time zone: UTC+2 (EET)
  - Summer (DST): UTC+3 (EEST)
- Postal code: MD-3532
- Area code: +373 235

Ivancea is a commune in Orhei District, Moldova. It is composed of three villages: Brănești, Furceni and Ivancea.

== Notable people ==
- Matei Donici
