= Haralambie Corbu =

Moldovan academic and writer (1930–2021)

Haralambie Corbu OR
- Born: 15 February 1930; Dubăsarii Vechi, Romania
- Died: 10 May 2021 (aged 91); Chișinău, Moldova
- Occupation: Professor
- Awards: Moldova's Order of the Republic

Haralambie Corbu (15 February 1930 – 10 May 2021) was a professor and author from the Republic of Moldova. He was a member of the Academy of Sciences of Moldova. Corbu was decorated with Moldova's highest state decoration – the Order of the Republic.

== Awards ==
- Order of the Republic - highest state distinction
- "Om Emerit"

== Honours ==
- Primary School "Haralambie Corbu", Dubăsarii Vechi

== Works ==
- "Alecsandri şi teatrul" (1963, 1973)
- Discursul direct. Aspecte ale publicisticii eminesciene (2000)
- Deschideri către valori (2003)
- Dincolo de mituri şi legende (2004)
- Constantin Stere şi timpul său (2005)
- Faţa ascunsă a cuvântului (2007)

== Bibliography ==
- Literatura și Arta Moldovei. Enciclopedie. Chişinău. Redacția Enciclopediei. 1986. Vol.1
- Valerian Ciobanu. Nume și Lume. Chişinău. Ed. Pontos., 2008
