= Zgărdești =

- Commune
- Location within Moldova
- Coordinates: 47°31′49″N 28°11′42″E
- Country: Moldova
- District: Telenești District
- Elevation: 74 m (243 ft)

Population (2014)
  - Total: 726
- Time zone: UTC+2 (EET)
  - Summer (DST): UTC+3 (EEST)
- Postal code: MD-5837

Zgărdești is a commune in Teleneşti District, Moldova. It is composed of three villages: Bondareuca, Ciofu and Zgărdești.

== Personalities ==
- Emanoil Catelli
