= Constantin Cheianu =

Moldovan writer and actor (born 1959)

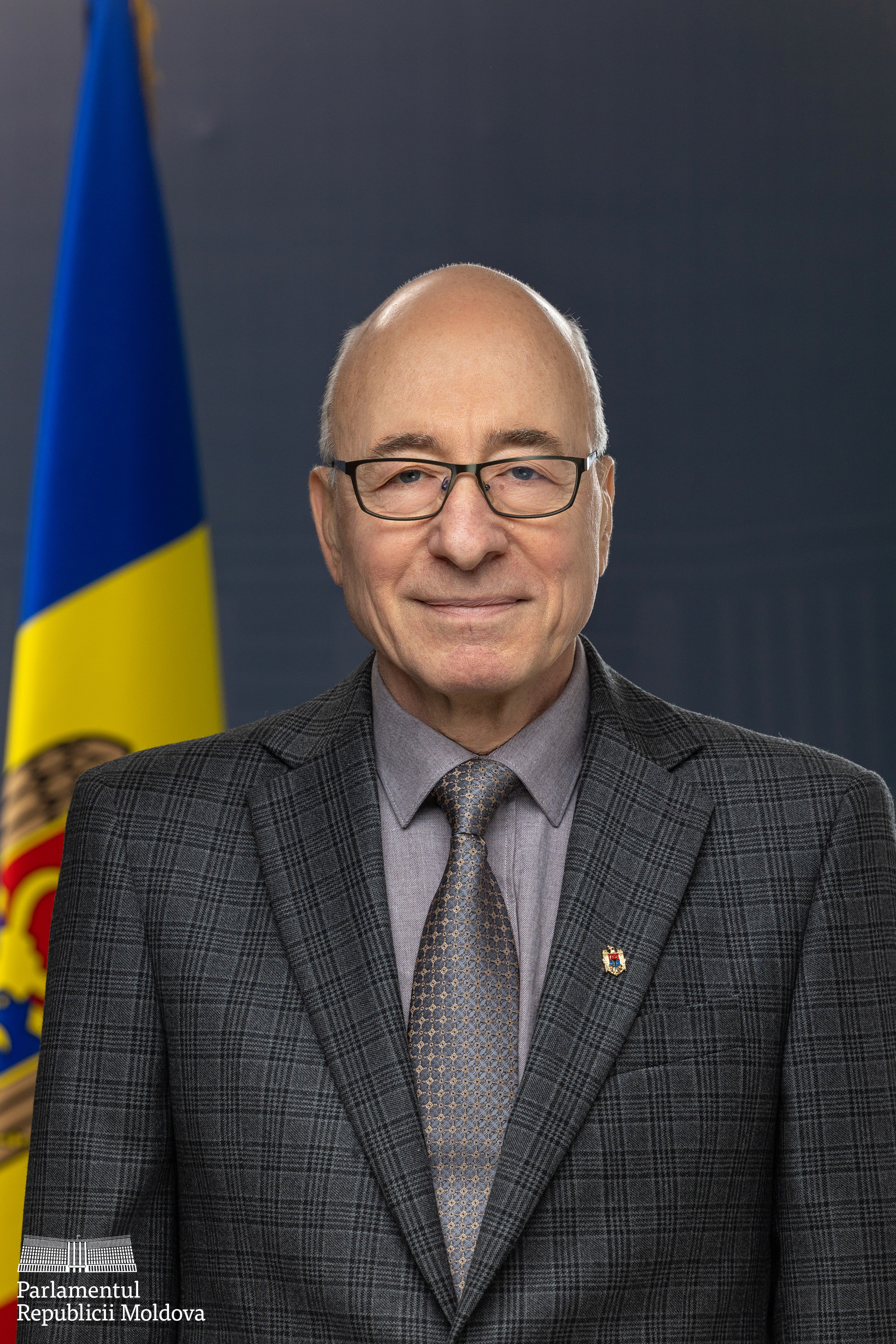
- Official portrait, 2025

Member of the Moldovan Parliament
- In office 22 October 2025 – 14 November 2025
- Succeeded by: Ana Oglinda
- Parliamentary group: Party of Action and Solidarity

Personal details
- Born: 21 September 1959 (age 66) Trușeni, Moldavian SSR, Soviet Union
- Education: Moldova State University
- Profession: writer, playwright, actor, journalist

Constantin Cheianu (born 21 September 1959) is a writer, playwright, prose writer, publicist, actor and TV anchor and journalist from the Republic of Moldova. As a dramaturg at the National Theatre in Chişinău, he adapted multiple novels for the stage. In 1993, together with the movie director Alexandru Vasilache he became co-founder of the Pocket Theatre (Romanian: Teatrul de Buzunar). Together with Anatol Durbala he leads the show Ora de Ras at Jurnal TV.

After graduating from the Faculty of Letters of the Moldova State University in Chișinău (1982), he became the editor of Literatura și Arta newspaper, where he starts with the short novel "Roua nouă".

== Biography ==
Constantin Cheianu was born on 21 September 1959 in Truşeni. He studied philology at Moldova State University before working as an author and editor for newspapers, magazines and radio. He has written about ten plays performed in Moldova and Romania. He worked for Literatura şi Arta, Contrafort, Sud-Est (magazine), Jurnal de Chişinău, Timpul de dimineaţă, Ministry of Culture (Moldova).

== Awards ==
- 1998 an Award for Dramaturgy given by the Writers’ Union of Moldova for the “Luminist” book
- 1999 the Award for Prose given by Writers’ Union of Moldova “Totul despre mine” (All about me) book
- 2008 Grand Prix for the play “ Luna la Monkberry” (The moon at Mokberry)
- Grand Prize at the National Drama Festival (Romanian: Marele Premiu la Festivalul National de Dramaturgie)

== Works ==
- "Totul despre mine", 1999
- „Sex & Perestroika”, Editura „Cartier”, 2009
