= Belopolʹskiy (crater) =

Lunar impact crater

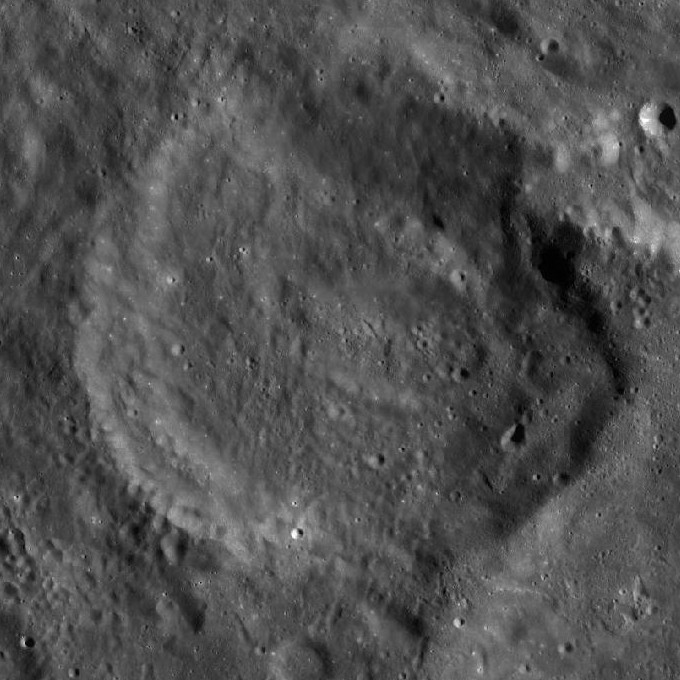
- LRO WAC image
- Coordinates: 17.2°S 128.1°W
- Diameter: 61.90 km (38.46 mi)
- Depth: Unknown
- Colongitude: 129° at sunrise
- Eponym: Aristarkh A. Belopolʹskiy

Belopolʹskiy is a lunar impact crater that is located on the far side of the Moon. It lies to the west of the crater Houzeau, and northeast of Strömgren. Just to the northwest of Belopolʹskiy is the crater Ioffe.

The rim of Belopolʹskiy is somewhat eroded, particularly at the southern end where several small craterlets have worn away the rim edge. There is a slight intrusion in the northwestern rim where the ground has been modified by neighbouring Ioffe. The crater interior is relatively level, and marked with several tiny craterlets.

This crater is named after Russian astronomer Aristarkh A. Belopolʹskiy (1854–1934). Its designation was formally adopted by the International Astronomical Union in 1970.

== See also ==
- 1004 Belopolskya
