= Contrafort =

Magazine based in Chișinău, Moldova

- Type: Monthly
- Publisher: Contrafort SRL; Romanian Cultural Institute
- Editor-in-chief: Vitalie Ciobanu
- Editor: Vasile Gârneț
- Staff writers: Grigore Chiper, Nicolae Spătaru, Eugenia Bojoga, Vladimir Bulat, Iulian Ciocan, Constantin Cheianu, Iurie Bodrug
- Founded: October 1994
- Language: Romanian
- Headquarters: Chișinău
- Website: www.contrafort.md

Contrafort was a Moldovan magazine focused on the contemporary Moldovan literature and culture and published from 1994 until 2021 in Chișinău, Moldova.
