= Trușeni =

Commune within the Chisinau municipality

Trușeni Comuna Trușeni
- Commune
- Commune of Trușeni
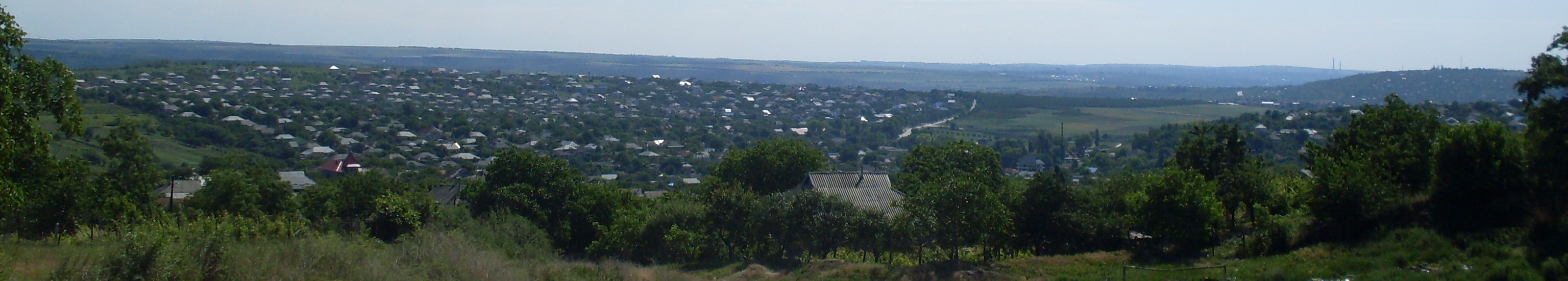
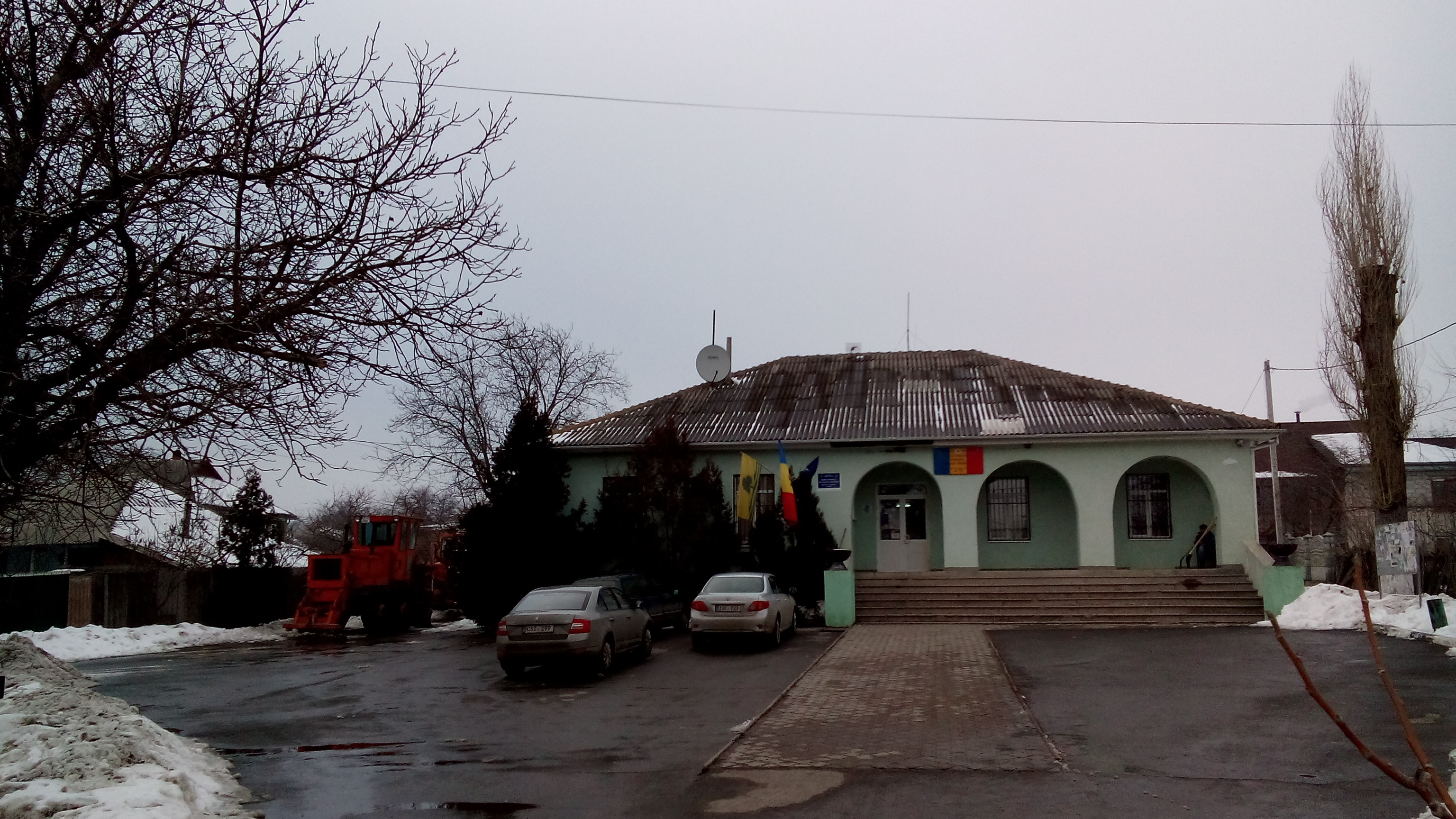
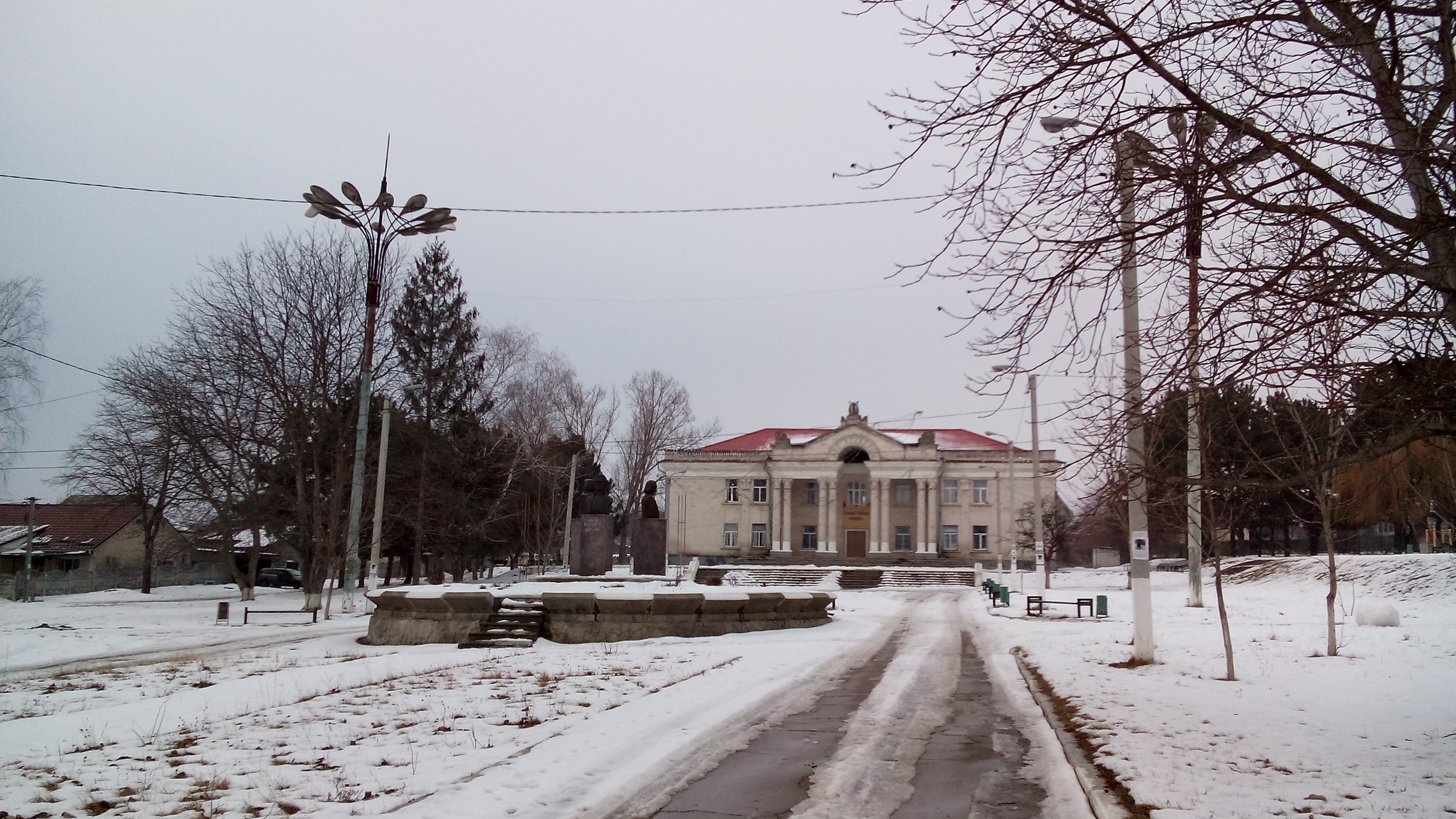
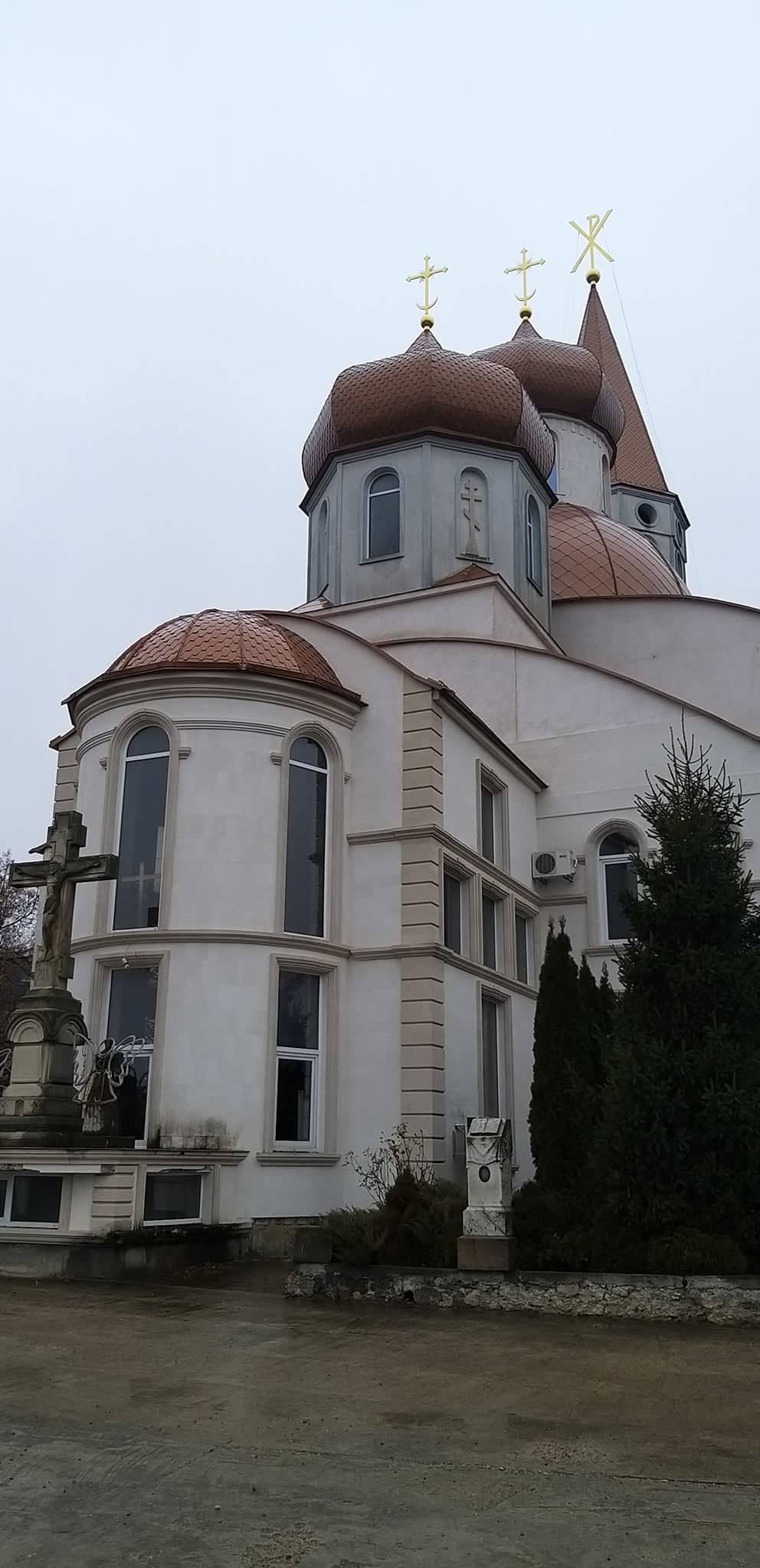
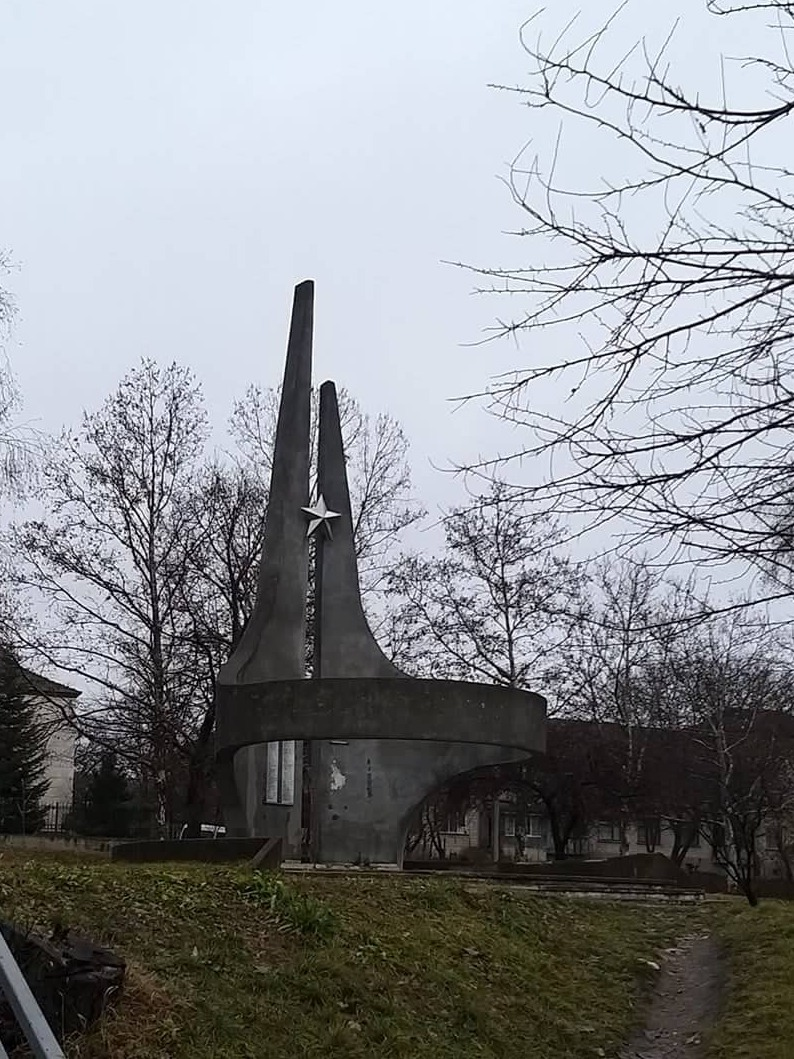
- Panorama of the Trușeni village as seen from the Ivașcova neighbourhood Trușeni Town Hall House of Culture Church of "Saint Arhanghel Mihail" World War 2 Memorial Monument Gallery of Trușeni landmarks

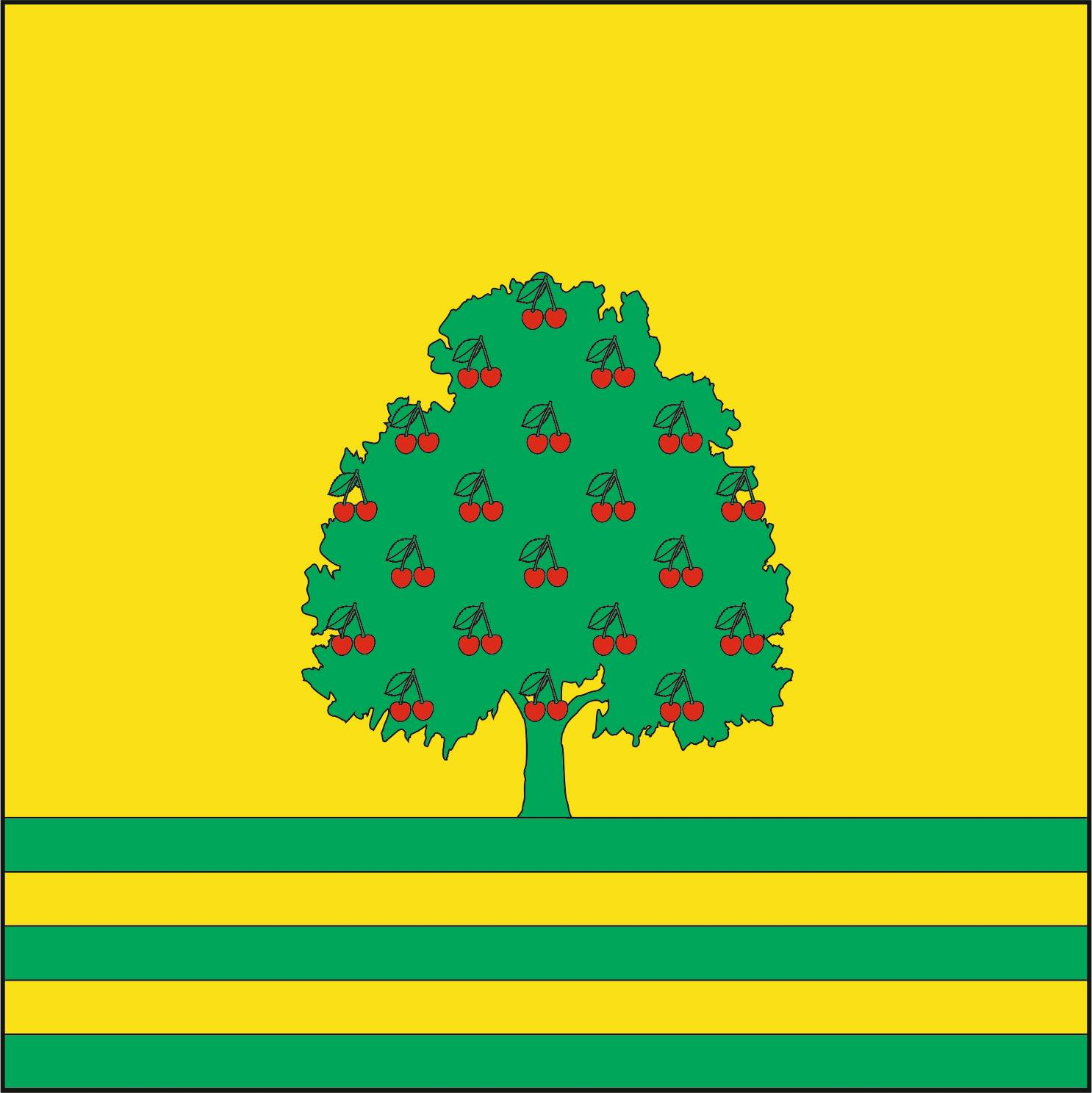
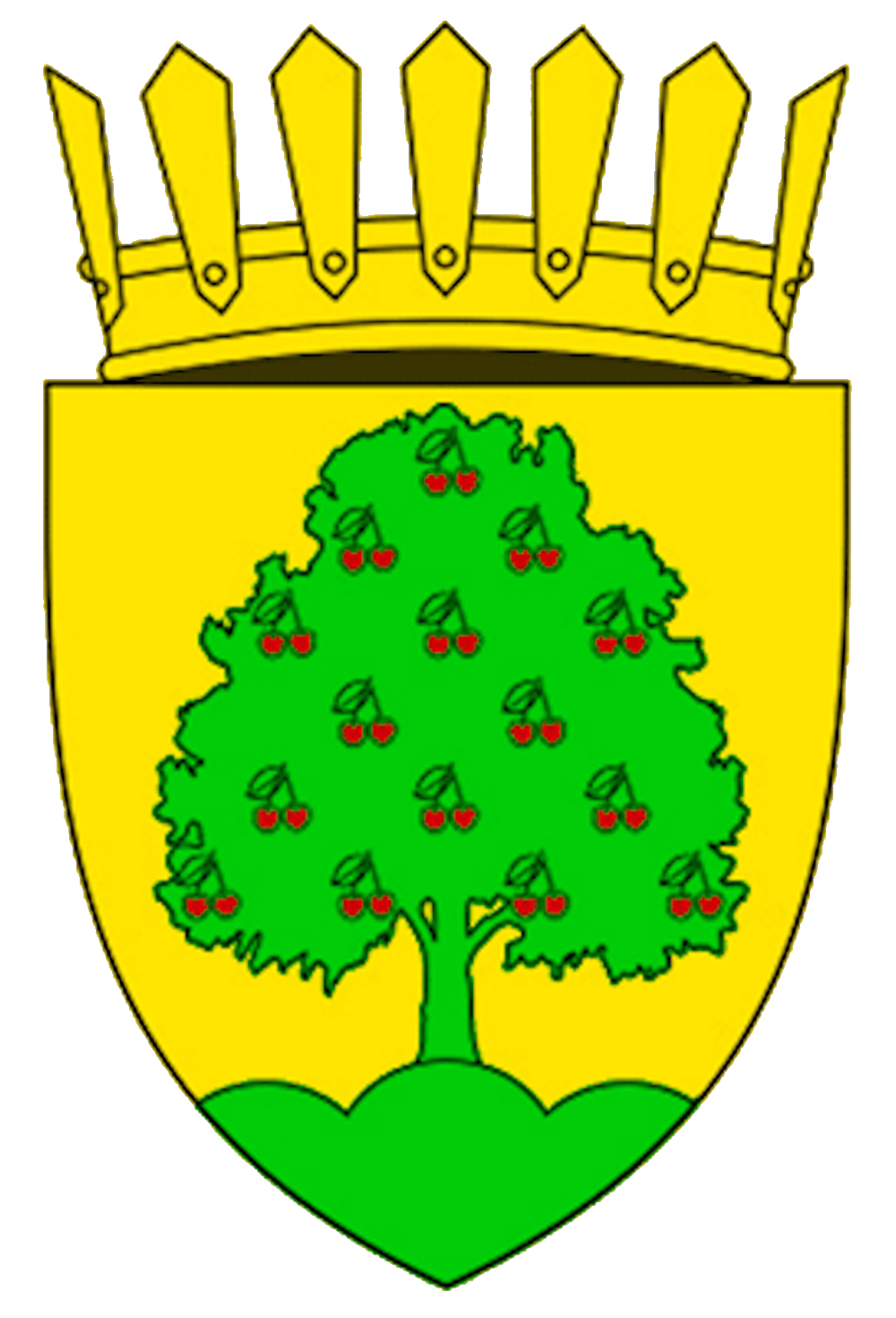
- Flag Coat of arms
- Anthem: Ode to the Village of Trușeni
- Interactive map of Trușeni
- Location in Moldova Trușeni (Europe)
- Coordinates: 47°04′N 28°41′E
- Country: Moldova
- Municipalities of Moldova: Chișinău Municipality
- Earliest Recorded: 1510-1545
- Founder: Toader Truș?
- Named for: Toader Truș?
- Seat: Primăria Trușeni

Government
  - Type: Mayor–council government
  - Mayor: Viorica Beregoi (PAS)
  - Vice-Mayor: Ghenadie Nedreaga

Area
  - Total: 46.88 km^{2} (18.10 sq mi)
  - Water: 0.06 km^{2} (0.023 sq mi)

Population (2024)
  - Total: 10,937
  - Density: 233.3/km^{2} (604.2/sq mi)
- Demonym: Trușenian
- Time zone: UTC+2 (EET)
  - Summer (DST): UTC+3 (EEST)
- Postal code: MD-3733
- Area code: +373 22 590 / +373 22 591
- Website: Official Website

Trușeni (Romanian pronunciation: [truˈʃenʲ]) is a commune and village in the Chișinău municipality, Moldova, located north‑west of the capital. The commune is composed of two villages: Dumbrava and Trușeni.

== Etymology ==
The name Trușeni is possibly an anthropotoponym, as the name may have originated from its legendary founder "Toader Truș" with local residents calling it "În sat alde Truș" (In Truș' village) before eventually calling it "Trușeni".

== History ==
Legend says that a certain Toader Truș left his hometown of Turluești and settled the village of Trușeni at where it is now, albeit this is only a legend and has no significant historical backing.

The earliest documentary mention of Trușeni is from a charter by Petru Rareș in the Principality of Moldavia in relation to setting the boundaries of the local Căpriana Monastery. However, according to the Statistical Dictionary of Bessarabia, Bucharest 1923, the village was established in 1510.

By 1904, the commune had amassed 3,426 residents.

=== Flag and Coat of Arms ===
The commune did not have a flag until October 2, 2013, when the Trușeni Local Council approved the cherry tree design for both the flag and coat of arms in Decree No. 8/8. The flag and coat of arms wouldn't be registered and/or "official" until June 13, 2016, when the Moldovan Government registered and officialized the flag and coat of arms cherry tree designs in Decree No. 2128.

== Geography ==
The Trușeni commune is situated north-west of Chișinău as a part of the Buiucani Sector of the Chișinău Municipality. The commune is bordered by Strășeni in the north-west, and Ialoveni in the south, with nearly the entire east being bordered by the other Chișinău Sectors.

The commune is composed of green grasslands while the Trușeni village sits in the north and Dumbrava within a small panhandle in the South-east, along with an unnamed village that straddles the Ialoveni District border in the south.

== Government & Politics ==
The commune is ruled under a mayor-council government, whereby the mayor makes a decision and the council converses on whether to approve or reject the decision.

As of 2022 the mayor position is controlled by Viorica Beregoi, while the Vice-mayor position is controlled by Ghenadii Nedreaga.

== Population & Demographics ==
According to the 2024 census, 10,937 inhabitants lived in the commune of Trușeni, an increase compared to the previous census in 2014, when 10,380 inhabitants were registered.

Ethnic composition of Trușeni (2024)
1. Moldovans (Note: There is an ongoing controversy regarding the ethnic identification of Moldovans and Romanians.) (77.3%)
2. Romanians (19.7%)
3. Ukrainians (1.00%)
4. Others (1.80%)
5. Not stated (0.20%)
Linguistic composition of Trușeni (2024)
1. Romanian (64.1%)
2. Moldovan (Note: In March 2023, the Parliament of Moldova passed a law updating all legislative texts and the constitution to refer to the national language as Romanian, effectively rendering the term "Moldovan" obsolete.) (31.2%)
3. Russian (3.70%)
4. Other (0.90%)

Historical population
Year	Pop.	±%
1904	3,426	—
2004	7,952	+132.1%
2014	10,380	+30.5%
2024	10,937	+5.4%

== Education ==
The commune has two public schools and two kindergartens.

== Dumbrava ==
Dumbrava is a village administered by the commune of Trușeni. On June 17, 1992, the Moldovan government issued a decision granting land to Trușeni, on which the village of Dumbrava would later be established. Construction of roads began a year after the land grant, and the first house was built in 1994. The village did not have an official name until August 15, 2001, when the Trușeni Local Council approved the name Dumbrava. According to the 2004 Moldovan census, the village had a population of 406.

== Notable people ==
- Constantin Cheianu — Writer, playwright, prose writer, publicist, actor, TV anchor and journalist.
- Maria Codreanu — People's artist of Moldova, Russian artist.
- Gheorghe Vasile Madan — Writer, actor, publicist, folklorist, translator.
- Margareta Nazarchevici — "Honored" Moldovan artist.
- Constantin Marian — Doctor in medical studies.

== See also ==
- Sectorul Buiucani
- List of cities and towns in Moldova
