= Toceni =

- Commune and village
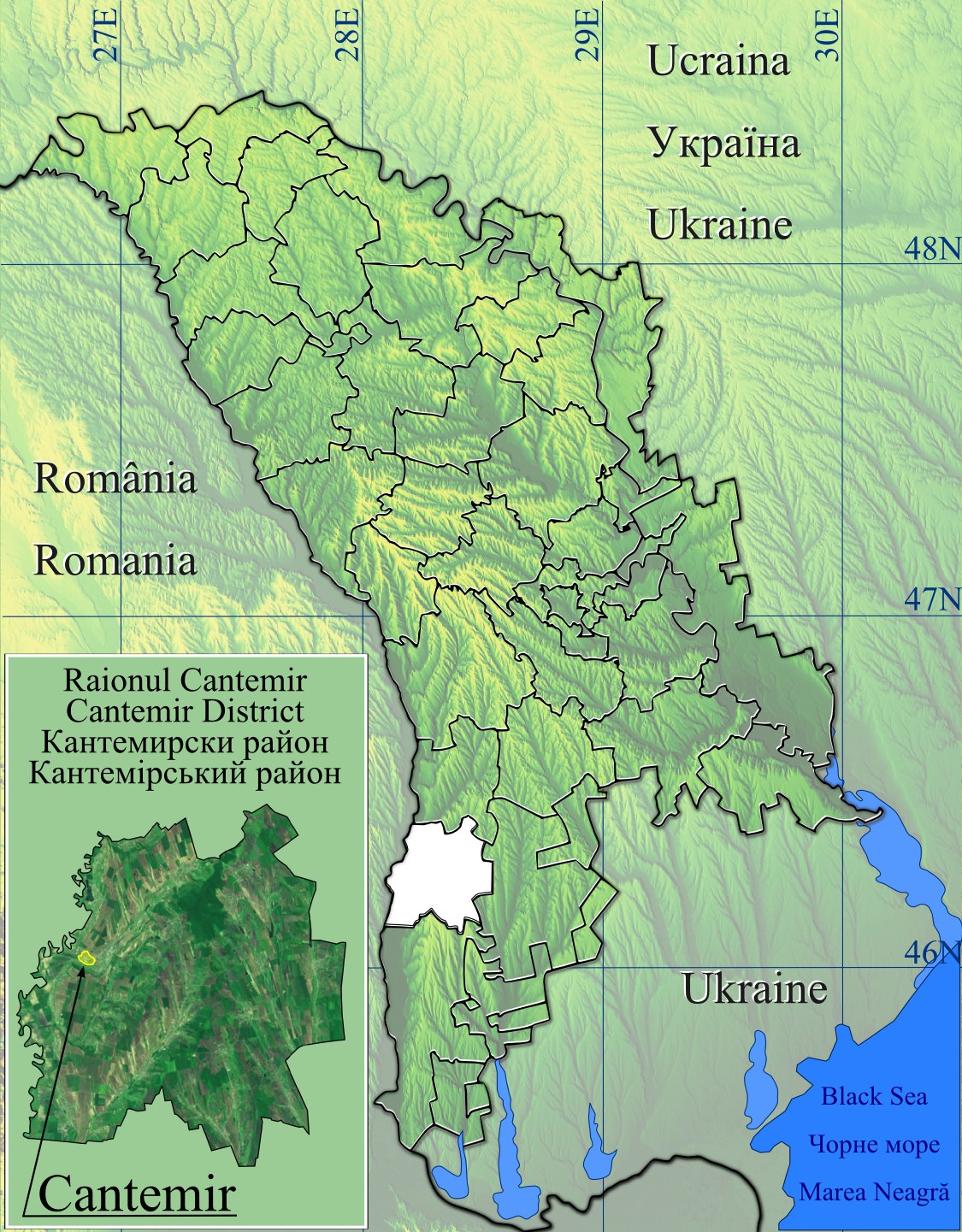
- Location in Moldova
- Coordinates: 46°22′N 28°13′E
- Country: Moldova
- District: Cantemir District

Population (2014)
  - Total: 1,104
- Time zone: UTC+2 (EET)
  - Summer (DST): UTC+3 (EEST)
- Postal code: MD-7340
- Area code: +373 273

Toceni is a commune in Cantemir District, Moldova. It is composed of two villages, Toceni and Vîlcele.

== Notable people ==
- Nicolae Ciornei
