= Emanoil Catelli =

Moldavian politician

Director General for Agriculture
- In office 10 April 1918 – 12 December 1918
- Prime Minister: Petru Cazacu
- Preceded by: Pantelimon Erhan

Member of the Senate of Romania

Personal details
- Born: 25 January 1883 Zgărdești
- Died: 18 February 1943 (aged 60) Sviyazhsk, Republic of Tatarstan, Russia
- Party: Moldavian Progressive Party

Emanoil Catelli (born 25 January 1883, Zgărdești, Russian Empire; died 18 February 1943, Sviyazhsk, Republic of Tatarstan, USSR) was a Moldavian politician.

== Biography ==
Emanoil Catelli was born on 25 January 1883 into a peasant's family from the village of Zgărdești, Bălți County. He was the second child of twelve in the family of Grigore and Anastasia Catelli (his siblings included Vasile, Ioan, Maria, Ecaterina, Melania, Leonida). From 1891 to 1895, he studied at the primary school. Three years later he was admitted to the Lower Agricultural School in Cucuruzeni, and graduated it in 1901. By 1903, Emanoil Catelli worked as a mechanic for agricultural machinery.

In September 1903, he was enrolled in the Tsarist army as a second-class military. In little over one year later he entered the Junkers School, where he was taught until August 1907. He completed his studies as a non-commissioned officer. In 1910, he became a lieutenant, and in 1914, he received the rank of master captain and in 1917, he became a captain.

In April 1917, he was sent to Odesa for office work, where he was stay at the beginning of the October Revolution. From the first days of his stay in Odesa, he stirred up feeling among Moldavians, explaining the need for Bassarabia to become autonomous. In addition, in that year he became the chairperson of the Moldavian National Committee in Odesa. He actively participated in establishing the "Sfatul Țării" ("Parliament"), being among the most devoted militants for the Union of Bessarabia with Romania.

After unification, Emanoil Catelli was appointed as General Director of Agriculture in the General Directorate of the Moldavian Democratic Republic. He occupied this position until November 1918, when the Directorate was dissolved. From 1919 by 1923, Catelli served as a popular judge in Nădușita, Soroca County. In 1920, he became a member of the National Liberal Party, which was in power. In 1923, the Council of Ministers of Romania appointed him as prefect of Bălți County. Catelli was the prefect for one year and four months.

From 1927 to 1928, he was elected and became the senator delegated by the Balti County. In 1933, the National Liberal Party came back to power again and Emanoil Catelli became the prefect of Balti County. In the three-year period when he was the prefect of Balti County, 49 schools were built (in comparison, from 1918 to 1933 only 44 schools were built), the Normal School was renovated and the new building of "Domnița Ileana" High School was built. He occupied this position up to 29 December 1937, once the royal dictatorship was established. Of all the prefects of the county, Emanoil Catelli was the most representative personality.

On 5 July 1940 Emanoil Catelli was arrested by the operative group of NKVD (People's Commissariat for Internal Affairs), forces of Bălți for the anti-revolutionary activity, and on 6 August he was transferred to the Chișinău prison. The NKVD group was afraid of his escape and they proceeded, as usual, in a secretive manner. First, they arrested him and then carried out all the proceedings. An arrest warrant did not exist because there were not enough forms. With the beginning of military operations for the liberation of Bessarabia from Romania, Emanoil Catelli was transferred deep inside the Soviet Empire, reaching Tatarstan. Thus, in 1942 Catelli was brought to Kazan. During the interrogations, Emanoil Catelli said that he did not regret the actions he had taken earlier, and that he would always resist Bolshevism.

== Family ==
He was married to Paraschiva Valuță and had two children, Victor and Octavian, both lawyers.

== Death ==
He died on 18 February 1943 in the ITK No.5 (Ispravitelno-Trudovaya Koloniya) in Sviyazhsk, Republic of Tatarstan, Russia. The doctors stated that the death occurred because of myocardial decompensation, but it is unlikely that the cause of death was established by doctors in the camp.

== Awards ==
- Order of the Star of Romania (Ordul Steaua României), Officer rank
- Order of the Crown of Romania (Ordul Coroana României), Officer rank
- Order of Ferdinand I (Ordinul Ferdinand I)
- Order of St Vladimir
