= Vitalie Ciobanu =

Moldovan writer and journalist

- Born: 4 May 1964 (age 61); Florești, Moldova
- Education: Moldova State University
- Known for: Writer
- Awards: Prize for debut of the Moldovan Writers' Union, 1991; Prize for essay of the Writers' Union of Romania, 1999; Prize for essay of the Moldovan Writers' Union, 2001.

Vitalie Ciobanu (born 4 May 1964) is a journalist from the Republic of Moldova. He is the editor in chief of Contrafort He is a member of the Writers' Union of Romania, the Moldovan Writers' Union and the Group for Social Dialogue.

== Biography ==
He studied journalism at the University of Chișinău. From 1986 to 1993, he was editor and editor-in-chief at the Hyperion Publishing House. Since 1994, he is editor-in-chief of Contrafort-magazine. He is a member of the International PEN Center (subsidiary Chișinău) since 1995 and president of Moldova PEN Centre since 2004, member of the Writers' Union of Romania since 1993, member of the Moldovan Writers' Union since 1992 and member of the Group for Social Dialogue Bucharest since 2004.

== Awards ==
- Prize for debut (prose) of the Moldovan Writers' Union, 1991.
- Prize for essay of the Writers' Union of Romania, 1999.
- Prize for essay of the Moldovan Writers' Union, 2001.

== Works ==
- "Literature Express. A look at Europe from train's window" (a diary realized with Vasile Garnet); "The Anatomia of geopolitical failure: Republic of Moldova" (political essays), Polirom Publishing House, Iasi, 2005.
- "The Waltz on Scaffold. 30 literary pretexts and one Prague diary", Cartier Publishing House, Chisinau, 2001.
- "The Fear from difference" (articles, essays, literary chronicles), Romanian Cultural Fondation, Bucharest, 1999.
- "The Change Post" (novel), Hyperion Publishing House Chișinau, 1991; – present in "Europaexpress. Ein literarisches Reisebuch". Eichborn, Berlin, 2001; in "The moment of truth", anthology of contemporary Romanian essayists, Dacia Publishing House, Cluj-Napoca, 1996; in "Donumenta", Regensburg-München-Berlin (2004).

== Bibliography ==
- Anatomia unui faliment geopolitic: Republica Moldova, România, 2005, editura Polirom.
- Frica de diferență. Eseuri și articole, București, 1999.
- Momentul adevărului. Antologie de eseuri românești contemporane, Cluj-Napoca, 1996.
- Schimbarea din strajă. Hyperion, Chișinău, 1991.
