= 2126 Gerasimovich =

Stony background asteroid

Discovery
- Discovered by: T. Smirnova
- Discovery site: Crimean Astrophysical Obs.
- Discovery date: 30 August 1970

Designations
- Named after: Boris Gerasimovich (Russian astronomer)
- Alternative designations: 1970 QZ · 1931 AQ; 1972 EH · 1976 GP_{8}
- Minor planet category: main-belt · (inner) background

Orbital characteristics
- Epoch 4 September 2017 (JD 2458000.5)
- Uncertainty parameter 0
- Observation arc: 86.48 yr (31,586 days)
- Aphelion: 2.6779 AU
- Perihelion: 2.1015 AU
- Semi-major axis: 2.3897 AU
- Eccentricity: 0.1206
- Orbital period (sidereal): 3.69 yr (1,349 days)
- Mean anomaly: 229.48°
- Mean motion: 0° 16^{m} 0.48^{s} / day
- Inclination: 8.4757°
- Longitude of ascending node: 327.62°
- Argument of perihelion: 70.181°

Physical characteristics
- Dimensions: 7.11±1.52 km 7.805±0.205 km 8.57 km (calculated); 9.36±0.68 km 9.46±2.73 km
- Synodic rotation period: 22.951±0.005 h
- Geometric albedo: 0.12±0.11; 0.20 (assumed); 0.221±0.034; 0.25±0.17; 0.3179±0.0514
- Spectral type: S (assumed)
- Absolute magnitude (H): 12.40 · 12.60 · 12.7 · 12.8 · 13.03

2126 Gerasimovich, provisional designation 1970 QZ, is a stony background asteroid from the inner regions of the asteroid belt, approximately 8 kilometers in diameter. It was discovered on 30 August 1970, by Soviet astronomer Tamara Smirnova at the Crimean Astrophysical Observatory in Nauchnyj, on the Crimean peninsula. The asteroid was named after Russian astronomer Boris Gerasimovich.

== Orbit and classification ==
Gerasimovich is a non-family asteroid from the main belt's background population. It orbits the Sun in the inner asteroid belt at a distance of 2.1–2.7 AU once every 3 years and 8 months (1,349 days; semi-major axis of 2.39 AU). Its orbit has an eccentricity of 0.12 and an inclination of 8° with respect to the ecliptic.

The body's observation arc begins with its first identification as 1931 AQ at Lowell Observatory in January 1931, almost 40 years prior to its official discovery observation at Nauchnyj.

== Physical characteristics ==
Gerasimovich is an assumed, stony S-type asteroid.

=== Rotation period ===
In October 2007, a rotational lightcurve of Gerasimovich was obtained from photometric observations by Maurice Clark at Montgomery College Observatory. Lightcurve analysis gave a rotation period of 22.951 hours with a brightness amplitude of 0.12 magnitude (U=2).

=== Diameter and albedo ===
According to the surveys carried out by the Japanese Akari satellite and the NEOWISE mission of NASA's Wide-field Infrared Survey Explorer, Gerasimovich measures between 7.11 and 9.46 kilometers in diameter and its surface has an albedo between 0.12 and 0.318.

The Collaborative Asteroid Lightcurve Link assumes a standard albedo for stony asteroids of 0.20 and calculates a diameter of 8.57 kilometers based on an absolute magnitude of 12.7.

== Naming ==
This minor planet was named after Russian astronomer Boris Gerasimovich (1889–1937), professor at the National University of Kharkiv and director of the Pulkovo Observatory near Saint Petersburg, Russia. He is also honored by a lunar crater Gerasimovich. The official naming citation was published by the Minor Planet Center on 1 June 1980 (M.P.C. 5359).
