= Ioffe (crater) =

Crater on the Moon

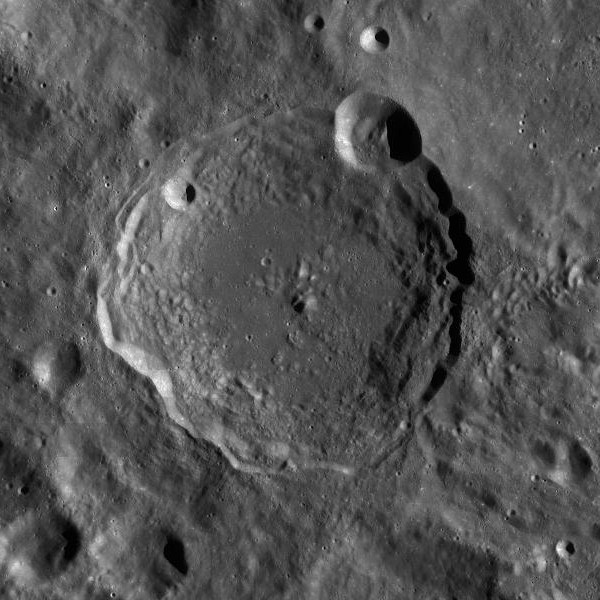
- LRO WAC image
- Coordinates: 14.4°S 129.2°W
- Diameter: 86 km
- Depth: Unknown
- Colongitude: 130° at sunrise
- Formation: Late Imbrian
- Eponym: Abram F. Ioffe

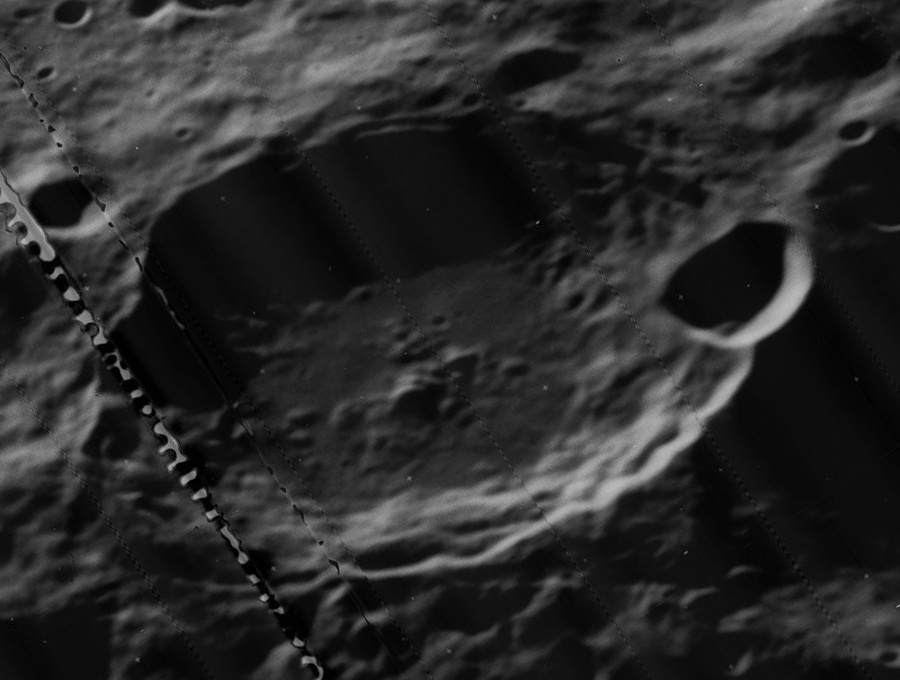
Oblique Lunar Orbiter 5 image (lines at left are blemishes on original image)

Ioffe is a lunar impact crater on the far side of the Moon. It lies to the south of the walled plain named Hertzsprung, and is attached to the southwestern outer rim of Fridman. Only a short stretch of terrain separates Ioffe from Belopol'skiy to the southeast.

This formation dates to the Late Imbrian period on the lunar geologic timescale. It is a relatively youthful crater, with a well-defined outer rim and a terraced inner wall. Nevertheless, the outer rim has been marked by subsequent impacts. A smaller crater lies along the rim edge where Ioffe is joined to Fridman. There is also a small craterlet along the northwestern rim.

The interior floor is relatively level, with the exception of a low, uneven ridge of material that stretches from just east of the midpoint to the south-southwestern inner wall. The infrared spectrum of pure crystalline plagioclase has been identified on the central ridge. The interior is free of impacts of note.

This crater was named after Abram Ioffe, a prominent Russian/Soviet scientist.
