= Von der Pahlen (crater) =

Crater on the Moon

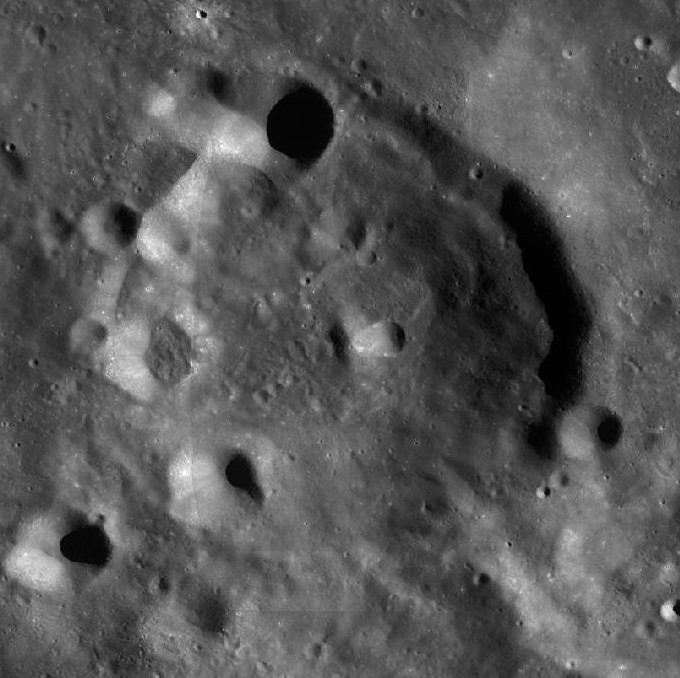
- LRO WAC image
- Coordinates: 24.8°S 132.7°W
- Diameter: 56 km
- Depth: Unknown
- Colongitude: 134° at sunrise
- Eponym: Emanuel von der Pahlen

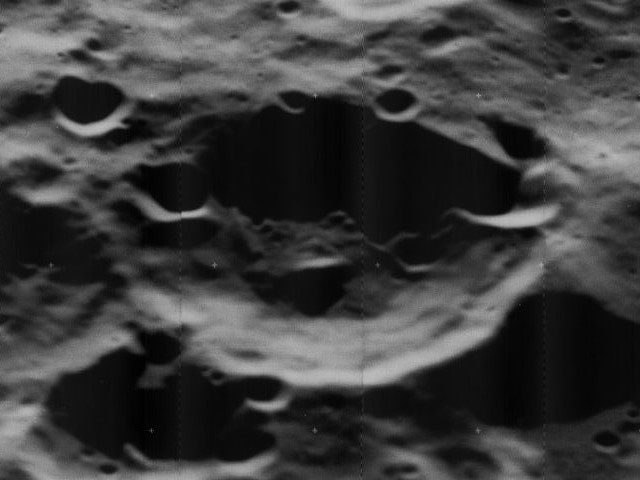
Oblique Lunar Orbiter 5 image

Von der Pahlen is an eroded lunar impact crater that lies on the far side of the Moon from the Earth. It is located about one crater diameter to the south-southwest of the crater Strömgren. Farther to the south is the larger Chebyshev, and to the west-southwest lies Das.

This crater has been heavily worn by subsequent impacts, leaving the rim and interior battered and cratered. There is a small crater attached to the exterior of the rim to the southeast, and the remains of a similar-sized crater along the southern edge. Small craterlets lie across the northwest, west, and southwestern rim edges. The remaining rim edge is rounded from impact erosion. A small craterlet lies almost at the crater midpoint.

== Satellite craters ==
By convention these features are identified on lunar maps by placing the letter on the side of the crater midpoint that is closest to Von der Pahlen.

| Von der Pahlen | Latitude | Longitude | Diameter |
|---|---|---|---|
| E | 24.5° S | 128.8° W | 32 km |
| H | 27.1° S | 127.5° W | 35 km |
| V | 23.8° S | 135.6° W | 19 km |
