= Fridman (crater) =

Crater on the Moon

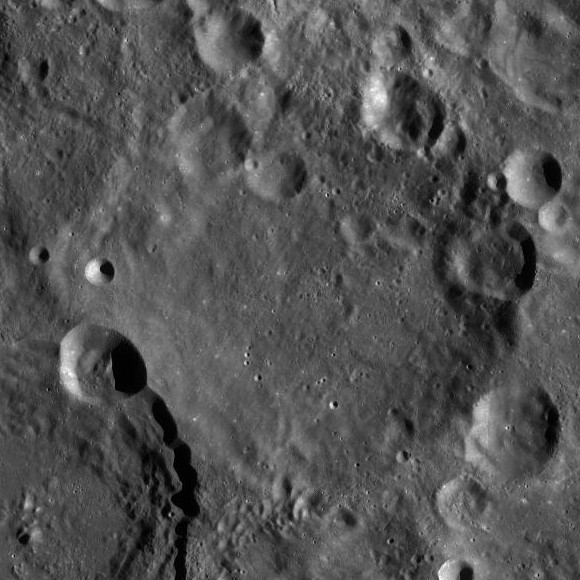
- LRO WAC image
- Coordinates: 12.6°S 126.0°W
- Diameter: 101.45 km (63.04 mi)
- Depth: Unknown
- Colongitude: 128° at sunrise
- Formation: Late Imbrian
- Eponym: Alexander Friedmann

Fridman is the remains of a lunar impact crater on the far side of the Moon. It lies due south of the huge walled plain Hertzsprung, and is attached to the northeastern rim of the crater Ioffe.

This formation dates to the Late Imbrian period of the lunar geologic timescale. It lies in the southern part of the ejecta blanket that encircles Hertzsprung, and in the west-northwestern part of the huge ejecta blanket surrounding the Mare Orientale impact basin.

The outer rim of this crater is heavily damaged, with a number of smaller craters lying across the sides. The most intact portion of the rim is along the southeastern side. The southwestern interior floor is partly overlaid by the outer rampart of Ioffe. The northern floor is marked by several small craters, while the southeastern floor is impacted by a number of tiny craterlets.

This crater is called Friedmann in some sources. It is named after Soviet physicist Alexander Alexandrovich Friedman (1888-1925). This designation was formally adopted in 1970 by the International Astronomical Union.

== Satellite craters ==
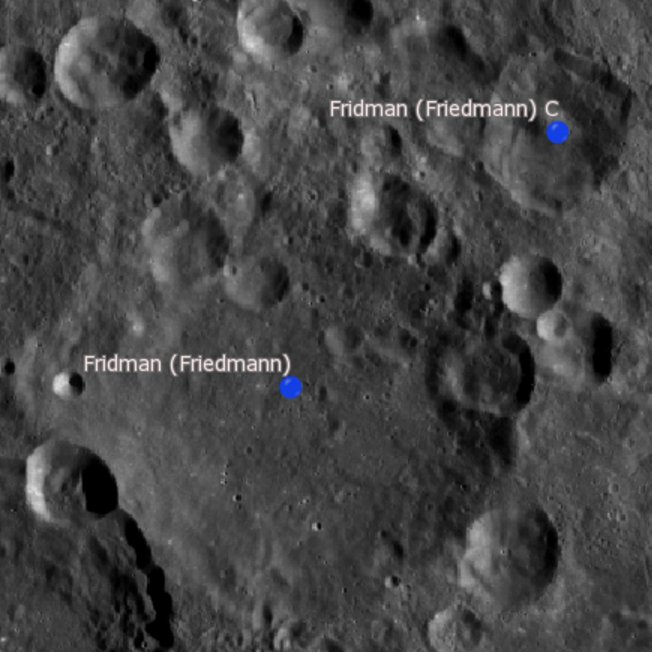
Satellite feature and surroundings

By convention this feature is identified on lunar maps by placing the letter on the side of the crater midpoint that is closest to Fridman.

Fridmann	Latitude	Longitude	Diameter
C	10.5° S	124.5° W	36 km
