= Aristarkh Belopolsky =

Russian astronomer (1854–1934)

- Аристарх Белопольский
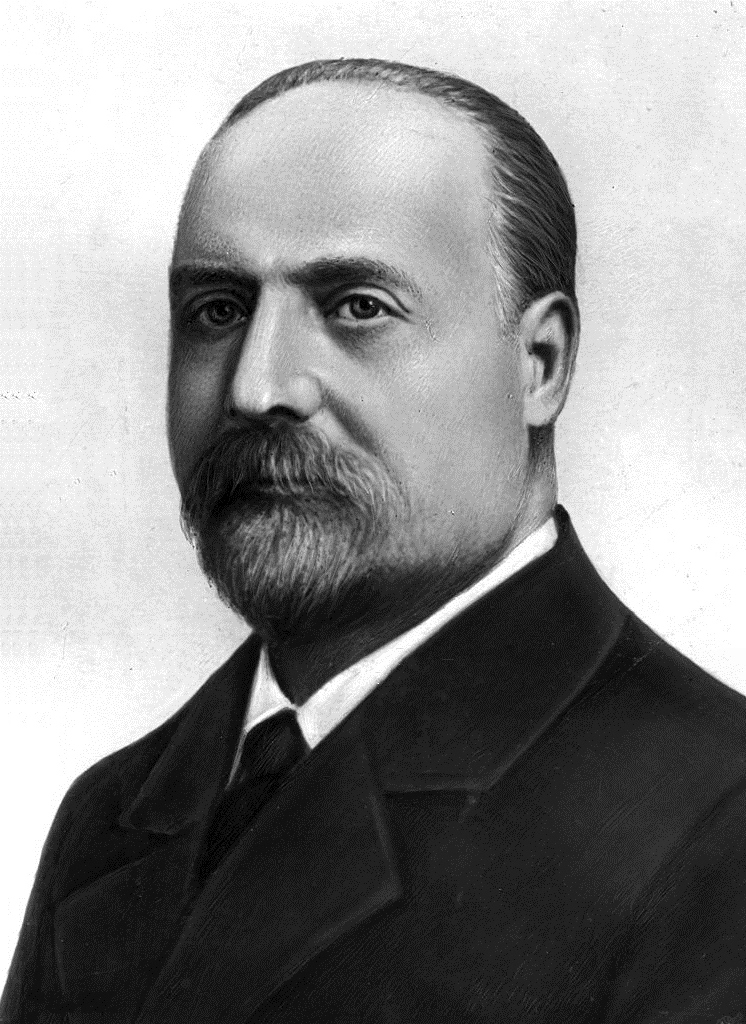
- Born: July 1, 1854
- Died: May 16, 1934 (aged 79)
- Education: Imperial Moscow University (1840)
- Occupation: Academician
- Scientific career
- Fields: Astronomy
- Workplaces: Pulkovo Observatory

Aristarkh Apollonovich Belopolsky (Аристарх Аполлонович Белопольский; 13 July [O.S. 1 July] 1854 – 16 May 1934) was a Russian and later Soviet astronomer. He was born in Moscow but his father's ancestors are from a Serbian town called Belo Polje. Adjunct professor since 1900, extraordinary (1903) and ordinary (1906) academician of the Imperial Academy of Sciences.

== Life ==
Belopolsky got his degree at Moscow University in 1876, and in 1878, he became the assistant to Fyodor Aleksandrovich Bredikhin at Moscow Observatory. In 1888, he joined the staff of Pulkovo Observatory.

He worked in spectroscopy and discovered a number of spectroscopic binaries. Among others, he discovered that Castor B was a spectroscopic binary with a period of 2.92 days.

Belopolsky was known for his fine instrument making, and in 1900 he built an apparatus with which he managed to experimentally detect Doppler shift of light reflected from a moving object. This was a breakthrough, since before this experiment the possibility of Doppler shift in light - as opposed to matter waves like sound - was still a controversial matter. He pioneered the use of optical Doppler shift to measure the rotational rates of distant objects. He was the first to discover that the equator of Jupiter rotates more rapidly than higher latitudes, and that the rings of Saturn do not rotate as a solid mass, proving that they were made up of individual small objects.

He attempted twice to measure the rotational rate of Venus, suggesting 24 hours in 1900 and 35 hours in 1911—one of countless unsuccessful attempts by astronomers of that time to measure the length of the Venusian day.

He was a good friend of Oskar Backlund, and when the latter died in 1916, he succeeded him as director of Pulkovo Observatory. However he resigned in 1918, because he did not like the administrative burden.

The crater Belopol'skiy on the Moon, the asteroid 1004 Belopolskya and an award of the Russian Academy of Sciences are named after him.

Belopolsky at the Fourth Conference International Union for Cooperation in Solar Research at Mount Wilson Observatory, 1910

== Bibliography ==
- Imperial Moscow University: 1755-1917: encyclopedic dictionary. Moscow: Russian political encyclopedia (ROSSPEN). 2010. pp. 61–63. ISBN 978-5-8243-1429-8 – via A. Andreev, D. Tsygankov.
