= Matei Donici =

Bessarabian general, politician and poet (1847–1921)

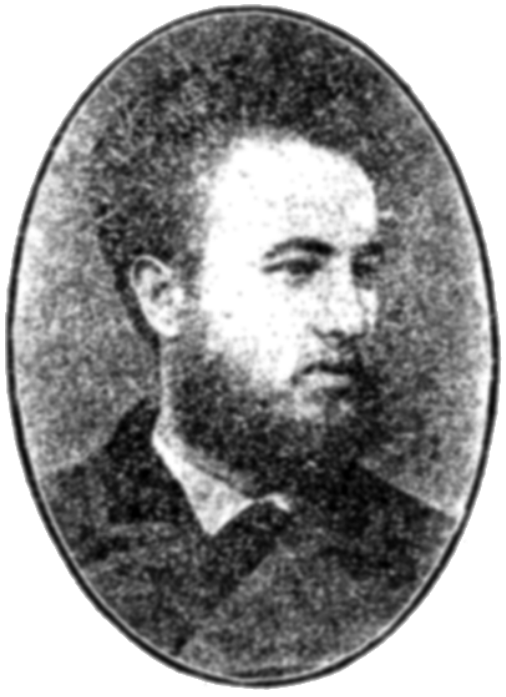
- Donici c. 1870
- Born: 8 January 1847; Brănești, Bessarabia Governorate, Russian Empire
- Died: 26 September 1921 (aged 74); Tighina, Kingdom of Romania
- Occupations: Landowner, soldier, poet
- Political party: National Moldavian Party; Moldavian Progressive Party

Matei Donici (Romanian pronunciation: [maˈtej ˈdonitʃʲ]; Russian: Матвей Степанович Донич, romanized: Matvey Stepanovich Donich; 8 January 1847 – 26 September 1921) was a Romanian poet, Imperial Russian Army general, and politician from Bessarabia. He was born at a time when his native region, as the eastern half of Moldavia, had been taken over by the Russian Empire and organized into a Bessarabia Governorate; his family belonged to Moldavian boyardom, having managed to preserve its estates. Though seeking and obtaining integration within the Russian nobility, the Donicis secretly cultivated Romanian nationalism, which shaped Matei's own outlook on politics. In the late 1860s, after flunking out of the Russian education system, he spent some time in Odesa and at his Bessarabian manor, composing poetry which spoke of Moldovans as a subset of the Romanians, and which included an all-out critique of Tsarist autocracy.

Donici tried to shun Russification, but was eventually pushed into a military career, and as such forced to maintain discretion about his nationalist ideals—though he continued to network with members of the emerging Romanian movement, including in particular the landowner Vasile Stroescu. Graduating as a cavalry cadet in 1874, Donici saw action with the Royal Serbian Army in the Serbian war of independence, and was then drafted for the Russo-Turkish War. Both conflicts also took him to the United Principalities (the core state of modern Romania), and allowed him to connect directly with mainstream Romanian literature. Receiving a head wound and permanent scar in the Battle of Shipka Pass, he continued to advance through the ranks. He was called up as a cavalry colonel for the Russo-Japanese War, but was captured by the Imperial Japanese Army. In the aftermath, he became a general.

Donici was reactivated politically by the Romanian Bessarabian caucus during the February Revolution of 1917: already in his seventies, Donici was a founding member of the National Moldavian Party (PNM) in Chișinău, and also affiliated with the Moldavian Progressive Party in Odesa. The final stages of World War I saw the union of Bessarabia with Romania; this effort was supported at an international level by his niece, Elena Donici. Donici himself was seen by the PNM ideologue Onisifor Ghibu as a rather incompetent and weak champion of the cause. He lived to see the union, but died shortly after at Tighina as a subject of the Romanian Kingdom.

== Origins and childhood ==
The Donicis, whose most famous representative was the early-19th-century fabulist Alecu Donici, were a clan of boyars from old Moldavia; they had risen into the aristocracy of the still-independent principality, though, according to scholar Petre V. Haneș, they ultimately originated from Romanian Orthodox parsons of the Moldavian Metropolis. Their first known patriarch, a "son of Done", had already established a presence in the eastern half (future Bessarabia, or Moldova), by marrying a daughter of Orhei's Pârcălab. On the basis of this and other matrimonial connections, by 1620 the Donicis had acquired major Bessarabian estates, including at Clișova, Criuleni, Hrușova, Ișnovăț, Lopatna, Milești, Onișcani, and Slobozia-Dușca. Moldavia was eventually segmented in 1812, with the eastern half becoming Russia's Bessarabia Governorate. At the height of Russification, the family continued to cultivate the Romanian vernacular. As noted by historian Ștefan Ciobanu, Romanian was the language of choice on their tombstones in Rîșcani cemetery.

As early as 1814, Stolnic Matei Donici, who was the poet's grandfather, had contributed to a letter of protest demanding Bessarabian self-government under a Boyar Divan and the Code of Justinian. After sustained efforts, he managed to obtain recognition for himself and his eight children as also belonging to Russian nobility. Ciobanu sees the Donicis as "one of the few boyar families to have preserved its national characteristics throughout that whole century of foreign dominion." Alecu himself left Bessarabia for Western Moldavia, which, by the time of his death, had merged into a Romanian nation-state, the United Principalities. He was therefore a direct contributor to Romanian literature—as Ciobanu assesses, his work therein was specifically Bessarabian, but remained virtually unknown to Bessarabian readers, into the 20th century.

Matei Jr was born on 8 January 1847 (the precise date was published in the 2010s, upon the rediscovery of his birth certificate); he was baptized into the Russian Orthodox Church on 16 January. His birthplace is known to have been his family's secondary estate in Brănești, Beletsky Uyezd. The son of Ștefan and Ecaterina Donici, who were themselves recognized as Russian nobles only after 1850, he had two younger brothers, Victor (born November 1850) and Vasile (January 1858), as well as a sister, Ana. Among the historiographers of Romanian nationalism in Bessarabia, Ion Pelivan argues that the future general must have been nurtured into the nationalist spirit during his early childhood—being a relative of landowners Gheorghe Donici and Nicolae Ștefan Casso, both of whom deeply resented Russian rule.

Early biographical records, consulted by Ciobanu, inform that Matei first attended a high school in the regional capital of Chișinău (then Kishinev), but also that he never graduated; he was then sent to a vocational school in Moscow, but dropped out in 1868. These sources contradict an account by Donici's Romanian friend, Ștefan Dan, who was persuaded that Donici had trained as a lawyer at Saint Petersburg State University, and had planned to set up a practice in Kishinev. Another account, dismissed by historian Gheorghe Bezviconi as "frivolous", contends that in 1863 Casso mandated a sixteen-year-old Donici to make his way into the United Principalities and contact their Domnitor, Alexandru Ioan Cuza, allegedly to obtain Romanian support for an anti-Russian uprising in Bessarabia.

== Poetic output and literary career ==
In 1869, Donici was lodging with an uncle in Odesa, before moving back to Brănești. It was at this stage that he met the rich philanthropist Vasile Stroescu, who was spearheading the effort to tone down Russification. This interval witnessed Donici's own documented turn toward Romanian nationalism and his debut as a poet. Donici's manuscript works, penned in the Latinate alphabet (used in Western Moldavia, as opposed to the Romanian Cyrillic, still favored in Bessarabia), sometimes include self-referential clues that he consciously braved Tsarist autocracy and the risk of being deported to Siberia if the texts ever fell into the hands of competent authorities. One piece, written at Odesa in August 1869, includes his lament:

Și gâcitam eu cândva
Astfel soartă a lua?
A lua un jug în spate
Să port zile pre sărate.
Să port numele de Rus
Și să fiu avan supus
La poporul ista crud
Ce năbușita'au până la Prut

Translation:

Could I ever have conceived
That I would have this to plead?
That they'd put on me this yoke
And on it I'd have to choke?
That I'd have to pass for Russian,
For a man of cruel passion,
That I'd have to kiss the foot
That now stomps upon the Prut?

At least one work in this succession was meant to be read: it is dedicated to local landowner, Pavel Roseti. This idyll refers to a Bessarabian village, Pepenești, as inhabited by Români vo[i]nici ("stout Romanians"); it describes the entire Governorate as "the Bessarabian land, whom the Russians have enslaved" (țara Bessarabă, ce[a] de Ruși făcută roabă), and identifies all eastern Moldavians as "a Christian people, with a Romanian name" (poporul creștinesc [ce] poartă nume românesc). The same work celebrates self-governance, including with its informal institutions, expressing a condescending and nostalgic take on the meetings of village notables at a local pub. Other scattered pieces are more classically idyllic, with melancholy visions of peasant life on the Răut valley.

Ciobanu argues that, like Andrei Nacco and the other few Bessarabian poets of his day, Donici was only able to make a minor note of protest against Russification, his own verse remaining unfamiliar to the "wider popular masses". Their literary imprint was a "beautiful deed", an expression of love for the common folk, but of no ultimate consequence. Donici himself pursued a public career in the Russian service. Around 1870, he was accepted by a cavalry school in Tver, graduating in 1874. Dan suggests that he was forcefully recruited by the Imperial Russian Army, who had been warned about his involvement with the Romanian nationalist movement. In his account, the recruitment appears as a form of punishment and Russification: he notes that Donici spent some seven years in Kiev, during which time his ability to speak Romanian declined sharply.

According to Dan, Donici was finally allowed to return to Kishinev, whereupon Stroescu took charge of his education, hiding him in his attic and forcing him to read and reread a text in Romanian, called Visul Maicii Domnului, thus allowing him to relearn the language. Later that year, Donici volunteered for service in Royal Serbian Army, and saw action in the Serbian war of independence. He fought at Aleksinac, after which he recovered in the Romanian capital, Bucharest—where he stirred the curiosity of locals with his language abilities, contrasting his Russian uniform. Dan, who was among those introduced to him at the time, expanded his Romanian reading list, presenting him with works by Nicolae Bălcescu, Dimitrie Bolintineanu, and Ion Ghica. Donici returned to the Balkans in 1877, when Russia and Romania fought a war against the Ottoman Empire (doubling as a Romanian war of independence). He had the rank of Rotmistr in a Dragoons regiment, and took a shrapnel head wound during the Battle of Shipka Pass. By July 1877, he was recovering in Bucharest's Brâncovenesc Hospital, under V. Ghica's care; he and Dan were reunited, discussing various cultural topics and consulting the poetry of Vasile Alecsandri (Donici kept the latter's book of Romanian folklore on his person, making sure that his Russian colleagues would never see it). Before returning to the front, Donici also visited the local art museum and attended premieres at the National Theatre Bucharest, seeing folk dances arranged by Gheorghe Moceanu.

== Prisoner of Japan and PNM figure ==
Advancing through the ranks to that of Colonel, Donici remained marked with a large scar on his forehead. He commanded the 55th Infantry Regiment, based in Podolsk. His final engagements came during the Russo-Japanese War of 1904–1905: he was captured in the Battle of Mukden, and interned by the Imperial Japanese Army. After the Treaty of Portsmouth, he was one of the Russian officers released at Vladivostok; he subsequently retired from active duty. By then, his sister Ana, married into the Engalychev family, had been found guilty of unspecified crimes and deported into the Olonets Governorate. One of his brothers, Victor, had moved to the newly formed Kingdom of Romania. Afflicted by paralytic dementia, in April 1897 he was forcefully committed at a mental institution near Iași. After the February Revolution of 1917, Matei, who had advanced to the rank of General, reappeared in public life as an affiliate of Pelivan's National Moldavian Party (PNM) and attending meetings held organized by Cuvânt Moldovenesc newspaper. He struck an unusual figure, being heavily bearded and wearing his general's uniform on the job, and never gave clues that he had been a literary man.

By April 1917, General Donici was presiding over sessions of the PNM Review Board, tasked with drafting a party platform. During these, he personally demanded the "widest autonomy" of Bessarabia with the future Russian state, asked for input from the Romanian Ukrainian community, and voted in favor of organizing a large-scale demonstration by Romanian nationalists in Odesa. The group's ideologue, Onisifor Ghibu, later remarked that Donici had shown up unexpectedly, and had accepted the others' offer to become provisional chairman. The move was ill-advised:

Bun general o fi fost în război bătrânul general Donici, dar ca președinte n-a fost bun. Fără energie, fără știința de conducere a unei adunări, prezența lui era mai mult o piedică pentru decursul ședinței, decât un avantaj. Nu era în stare să conducă nimic, dar suflet avea cinstit, și frumos, și moldovenesc	That General Donici might have been a good wartime general, but as a president he failed us. He had no energy, no competence for chairing a meeting, his presence was mostly an obstacle on the meeting's course—not an advantage. He could not preside upon anything whatsoever, but he had an honest soul, a lovely soul, a Moldavian soul

On 5 April 1917, the PNM elected its steering committee, with Stroescu as executive chairman; Donici himself was one of the sixteen regular members of that board. Immediately after his new appointment, Donici announced that he was leaving for Tighina (Bender), and from there would cross over into Odesa, to personally organize the nationalists' rally. The news was welcomed by the other PNM activists; Ghibu and Pan Halippa drafted the speech that he was supposed to give in support of the Odesa movement. He was in parallel affiliated with the Moldavian Progressive Party, established in Odesa by Emanoil Catelli.

Donici lived to see the union of Bessarabia with Romania and the overall establishment of Greater Romania, dying on 26 September 1921 at his new home in Tighina. His brother Vasile was still alive in the mid-1920s; Matei had left his papers, including his poetic output, to be published by his niece Elena Donici—she had already spent time in Romania, graduating from the University of Iași—who then handed them to Pelivan. The family was dying out; as one of its final representatives, Elena embraced Romanian nationalism from her place of exile in Paris, campaigning for Greater Romania's recognition during the international peace conference. A half-Russian relative, the novelist and activist Leon Donici-Dobronravov, also took up similar activities before his death in 1926.
