= Nicolae Ciornei =

Bessarabian politician

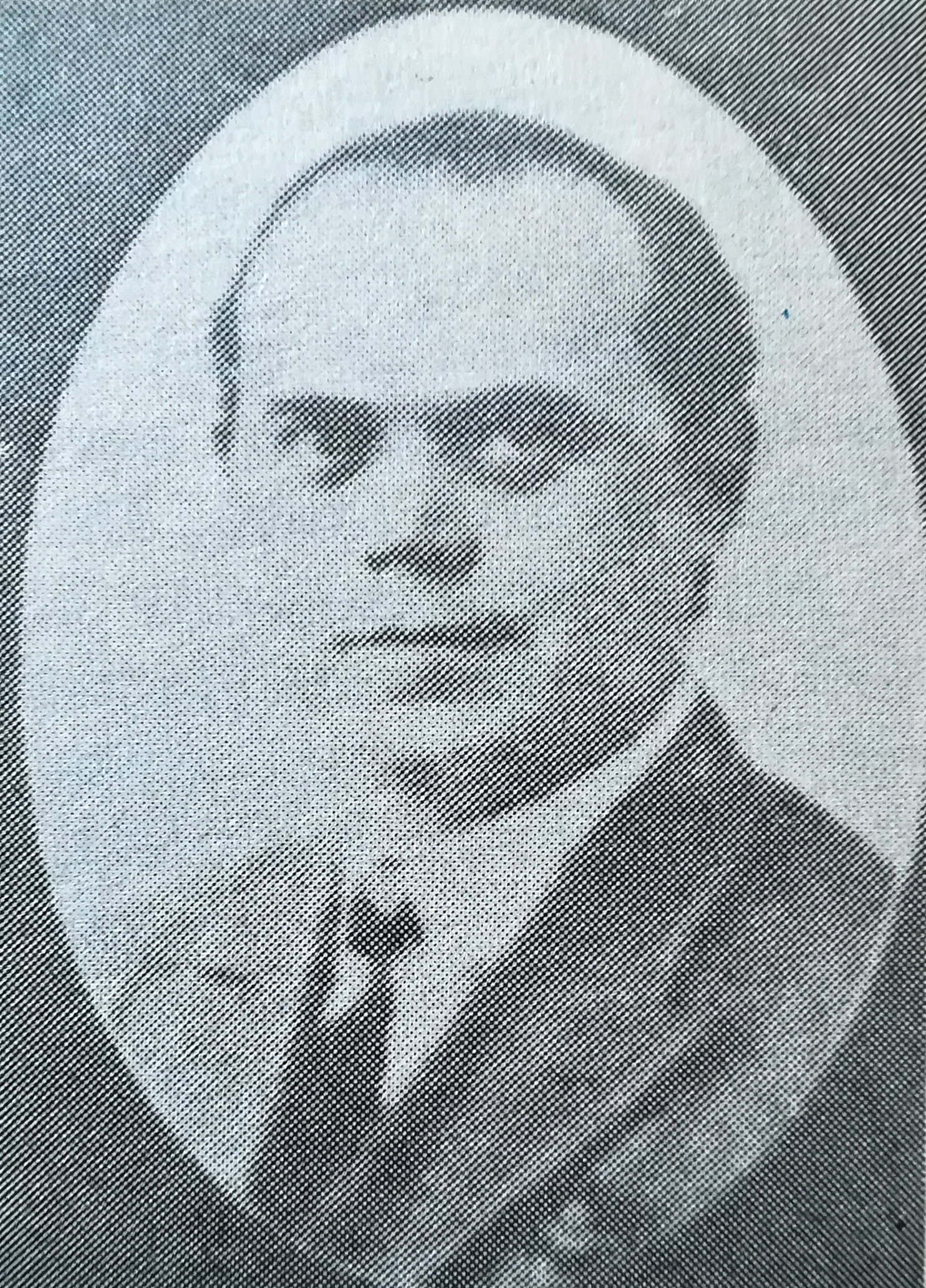
- Romanian politician

Member of the Moldovan Parliament
- In office 1917–1918

Nicolae Ciornei (born 1892, Toceni, Cahul County - died 20th century) was a Bessarabian politician.

== Biography ==
He served as Member of the Moldovan Parliament (1917–1918).

== Political activity ==
In 1917 at the end of March, in Odessa, Nicolae Ciornei, along with Captain Emilian Catelli, established the Progressive Party. Ciornei received from the organizing committee of the progressive Moldovan party the task of moving to all the headquarters and institutions of Odessa to explain to the Moldovan soldiers in their mother tongue the meaning of the events that took place and he immediately took action. At the beginning of April, at the meeting of the Moldovan delegates from the Odessa garrison, along with the seamen's delegates and the student delegates, the Executive Committee of the NMP, the Odessa section, was elected. Among the 18 people in the new committee headed by Captain Catelli are the second lieutenant Nicolae Ciornei.

On 14 May 1917 the Moldavian Soldierly Committee of Odessa was established, of which Nicolae Ciornei was also a member. At the beginning of the summer of 1917 such committees multiply and even arose a movement of the Romanian Bessarabian soldiers.

Nicolae Ciornei was named approximately in the beginning of July in an extraordinary commission for the investigation of the riots in Orhei County, following some disorders caused by the deserters. During the same period, through the care of the Soldierly Committee from Odessa formed cohorts of soldiers from Bessarabian soldiers to guard the military depots in Bessarabia. Together with other Bessarabian officers, second lieutenant Ciornei dealt with the organization of these cohorts. On 20 October 1917 the deputy, Nicolae Ciornei, was appointed by the congress of Moldovan soldiers as deputy in the Moldovan Parliament from Ismail County.

At the opening of the Sfatului Țării the deputy Nicolae Ciornei became the inspector of the cohorts. In the following days, he launched an order to change the name of cohorts to that of flying detachments. The Russian General Staff from Odessa orders them to report on the basis of which order he made this change, and Ciornei answers telegraphically: "The history of the nation has its motives and foundations". On such a response, the General Staff did not return with any other orders. On 11 January 1918, at a critical moment, Nicolae Ciornei, along with other soldiers, joined Captain D. Bogos in order to preserve the order in the disorder caused by Frontotdel, who, starting with the evacuation of Chișinău, wanted to destroy some buildings.

== Gallery ==
Moldovan stamp, 1998

== Bibliography ==
- Gheorghe E. Cojocaru, Sfatul Țării: itinerar, Civitas, Chişinău, 1998, ISBN 9975-936-20-2
- Mihai Taşcă, Sfatul Țării şi actualele autorităţi locale, "Timpul de dimineaţă", no. 114 (849), June 27, 2008 (page 16)
