= Gerasimovich (crater) =

Lunar impact crater

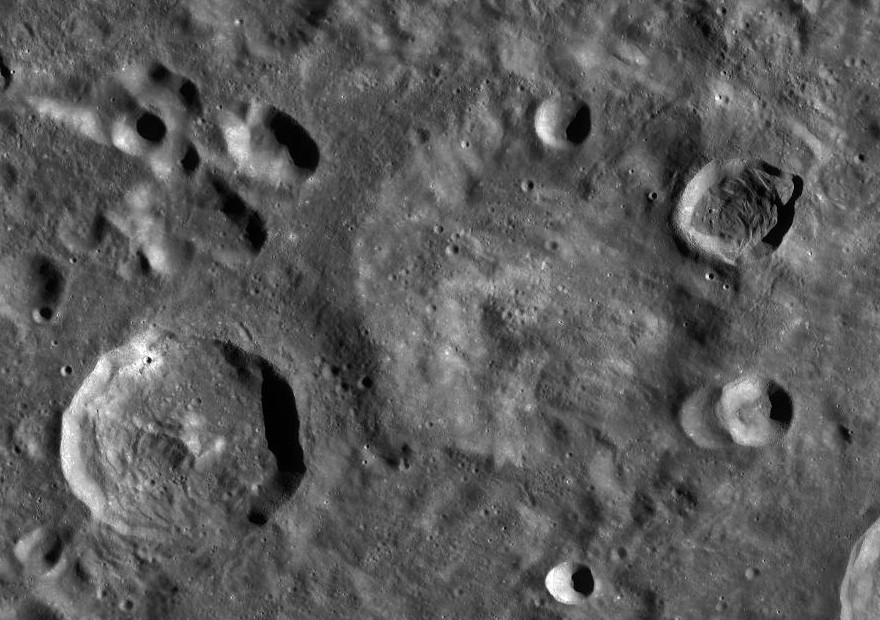
- LRO WAC image, with Gerasimovich right of center, Gerasimovich R left of center, and Gerasimovich D in upper right on the rim of Gerasimovich
- Coordinates: 22.9°S 122.6°W
- Diameter: 86 km
- Depth: Unknown
- Colongitude: 235° at sunrise
- Eponym: Boris Gerasimovich

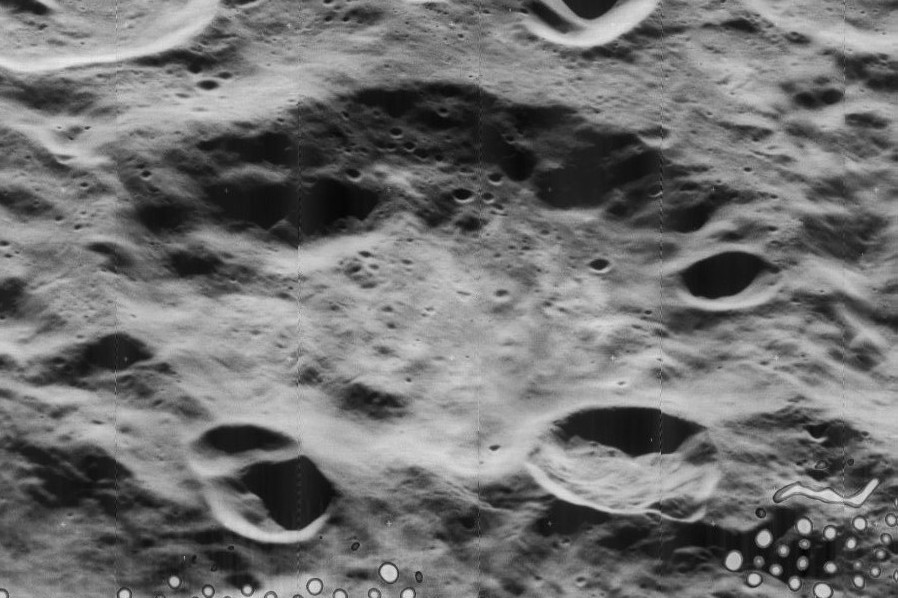
Oblique Lunar Orbiter 5 view of Gerasimovich, facing west

Gerasimovich is a lunar impact crater on the far side of the Moon. It lies beyond the western limb, to the west-northwest of the immense Mare Orientale impact basin. The outer blanket of ejecta from this impact reaches nearly to the rim of Gerasimovich. Nearby craters of note include Houzeau to the north and the smaller Ellerman to the southeast.

The outer rim of this crater is worn and eroded, with a perimeter that has been modified and reshaped by nearby impacts. The much younger crater Gerasimovich D lies across the northeastern rim, and lies near the center of a poorly organized blanket of higher albedo deposits. Just to the west-southwest of the outer rim is the young, sharp-rimmed crater Gerasimovich R. The interior floor of Gerasimovich is irregular near the edges, and is marked by several small craterlets.

Gerasimovich is located at the antipode of the Mare Crisium impact basin.

== Magnetism ==
Gerasimovich is home to a powerful magnetic anomaly. This an area of the Moon that contains an unusually strong, localised magnetic field on a body that lacks a global dipole like that of the Earth. As such, the crater hosts an enigmatic feature known as a lunar swirl, an area of unusually high albedo but no corresponding difference in topography, i.e., it is brighter than the surrounding terrain but is not higher or lower than that terrain. It is thought that the high albedo is a result of this localised magnetic field.

On Earth, radiation is deflected by the global magnetic field and attenuated by the atmosphere. The Moon however lacks both of these things and radiation, unimpeded, will darken the surface over time. It is thought then that a localised magnetic field will create a 'mini-magnetosphere', having locally the same effect as a global field might. This protection means that the surface at Gerasimovich is optically youthful compared to the surrounding landscape, which is what is seen as lunar swirls.

== Satellite craters ==
By convention these features are identified on lunar maps by placing the letter on the side of the crater midpoint that is closest to Gerasimovich.

Gerasimovich	Latitude	Longitude	Diameter
D	22.3° S	121.6° W	26 km
R	24.1° S	125.9° W	55 km

== See also ==
- 2126 Gerasimovich, asteroid
