= Emanuel von der Pahlen =

German astronomer (1882–1952)

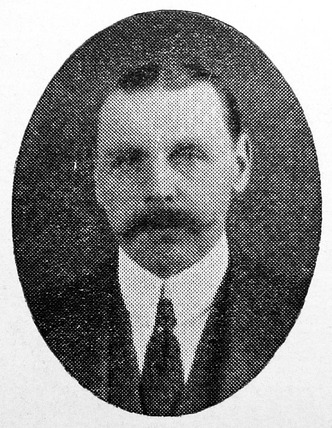

Baron Emanuel A. von der Pahlen (4 July 1882 – 18 July 1952) was a German astronomer.

He was born in St. Petersburg, Russia, but left for Germany following the revolution of 1917. He was educated at University of Göttingen, where he was awarded a Doctorate of Mathematical Sciences. Prior to World War I he joined solar eclipse expeditions in 1905, 1912 and 1914. Between the world wars, he was employed at the Astrophysikalishen Observatorium Potsdam. He taught at the University of Basel. In 1947 he published Einführung in die Dynamik von Sternsystemen (English: Introduction to the Dynamics of Star Systems), a 241-page work on galaxies.

The crater Von der Pahlen on the Moon is named after him.
