= Ciuhur =

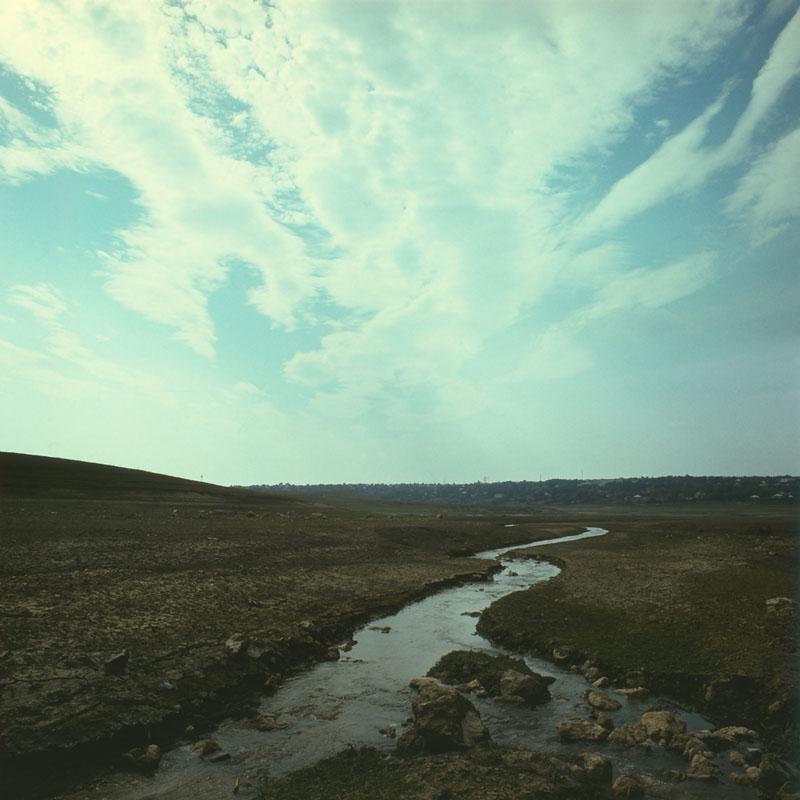

Location
- Country: Moldova

Physical characteristics
- Mouth
  - location: Prut near Costești
  - coordinates: 47.873°N 27.251°E

Basin features
- Progression: Prut→ Danube→ Black Sea

The Ciuhur is a left tributary of the river Prut in northwestern Moldova. Its source is near the town Ocnița, and it flows through the villages Mihălășeni, Grinăuți-Raia, Bîrlădeni, Ruseni, Parcova, Cupcini, Stolniceni, Pociumbăuți, Pociumbeni, Horodiște and Văratic. It discharges into the Lake Stânca-Costești, which is drained by the Prut, near Costești.
