= Pociumbeni =

- Commune
- Location in Moldova
- Coordinates: 47°59′N 27°18′E
- Country: Moldova
- District: Rîșcani District

Population (2014)
  - Total: 1,158
- Time zone: UTC+2 (EET)
  - Summer (DST): UTC+3 (EEST)

Pociumbeni is a commune in Rîșcani District, Moldova. It is composed of two villages, Druța and Pociumbeni.

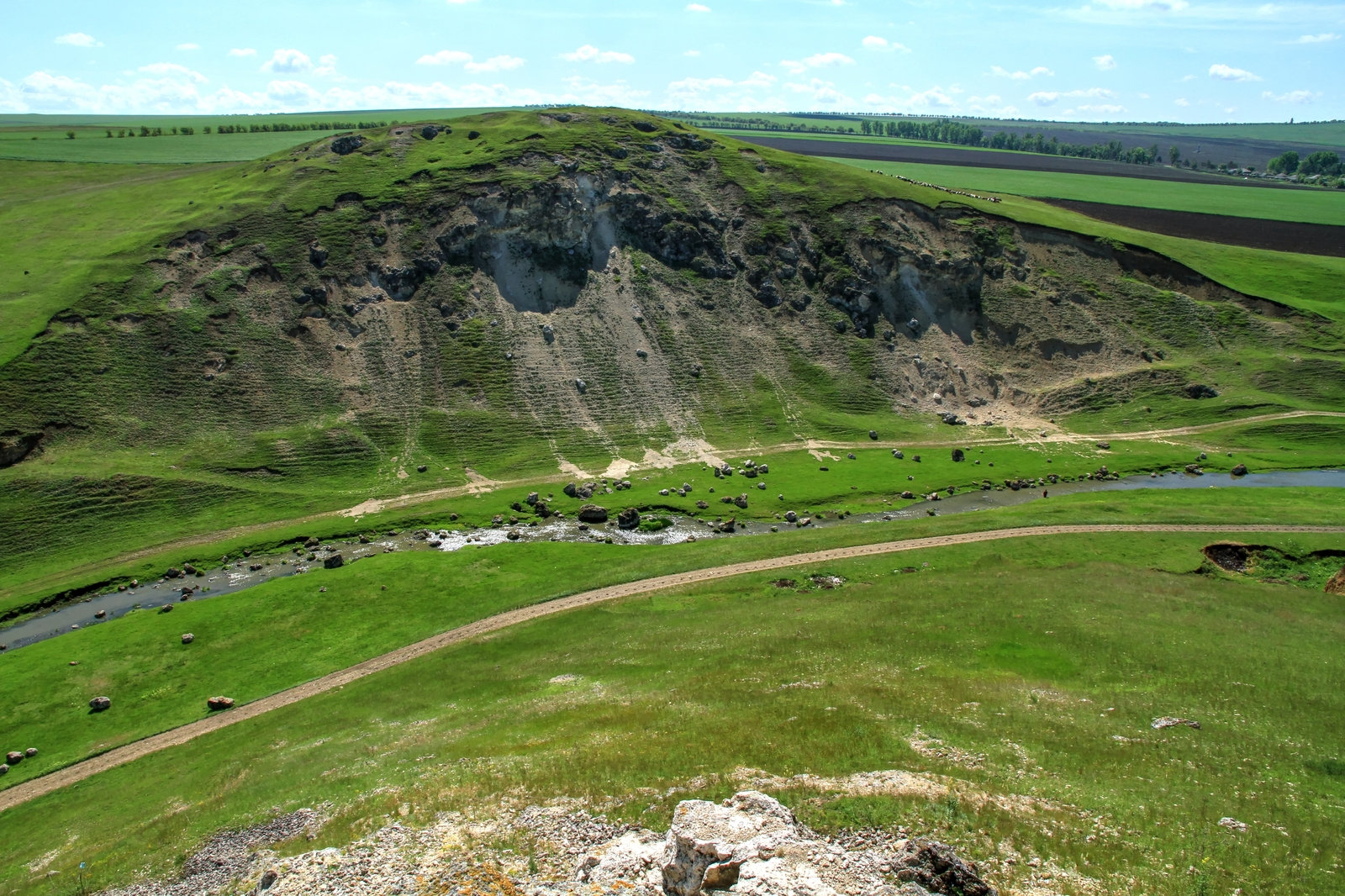
Pociumbeni Defile

The village of Pociumbeni was mentioned in documents in the year 1672. The name of the locality probably comes from "pociumb" (pillar), to which the animals were likely tied when taken out to pasture. The village is located in the valley of the Ciuhur river. Along the Brătușeni-Stolniceni-Pociumbăuți river segment, and especially from Pociumbeni to Horodiște-Duruitoarea-Văratic, picturesque landscapes can be encountered. In the center of the village lies the cemetery of the Moldavian poet and boyar Teodor Vârnav's family.

== Notable people ==
- Victor Catan
- Valentina Tăzlăuanu
