= Teodor Vârnav =

Romanian writer and translator

- Born: 1 March 1801; Florești, Moldavia
- Died: 22 February 1868 (aged (67); Pociumbeni, Russian Empire
- Resting place: Pociumbeni Cemetery
- Citizenship: Russian Empire

Teodor Vârnav (also Vîrnav; 1801 – 1868) was a Romanian writer and translator. Born in Moldavia, he settled in Bessarabia (presently in Moldova) after the 1812 partition of Moldavia at the end of the Russo-Turkish War.

== Life ==
Vârnav was born in Florești, Moldavia in a family of a minor nobleman. He received education at home, including knowledge of Romanian and Greek languages. From 1818, he lived in Bessarabia. He briefly served in the court of the city of Khotyn as a "writer in the Moldavian language" ("scriitor în limba moldovenească"), and later became the head of a bureau.

In 1822, he acquired estates near Iași and Khotyn and resided in the village of Burlănești (now Edineț district). In 1840, he moved to the village of Pociumbeni, where he lived until the end of his life, engaging in agricultural activities.

== Creation ==
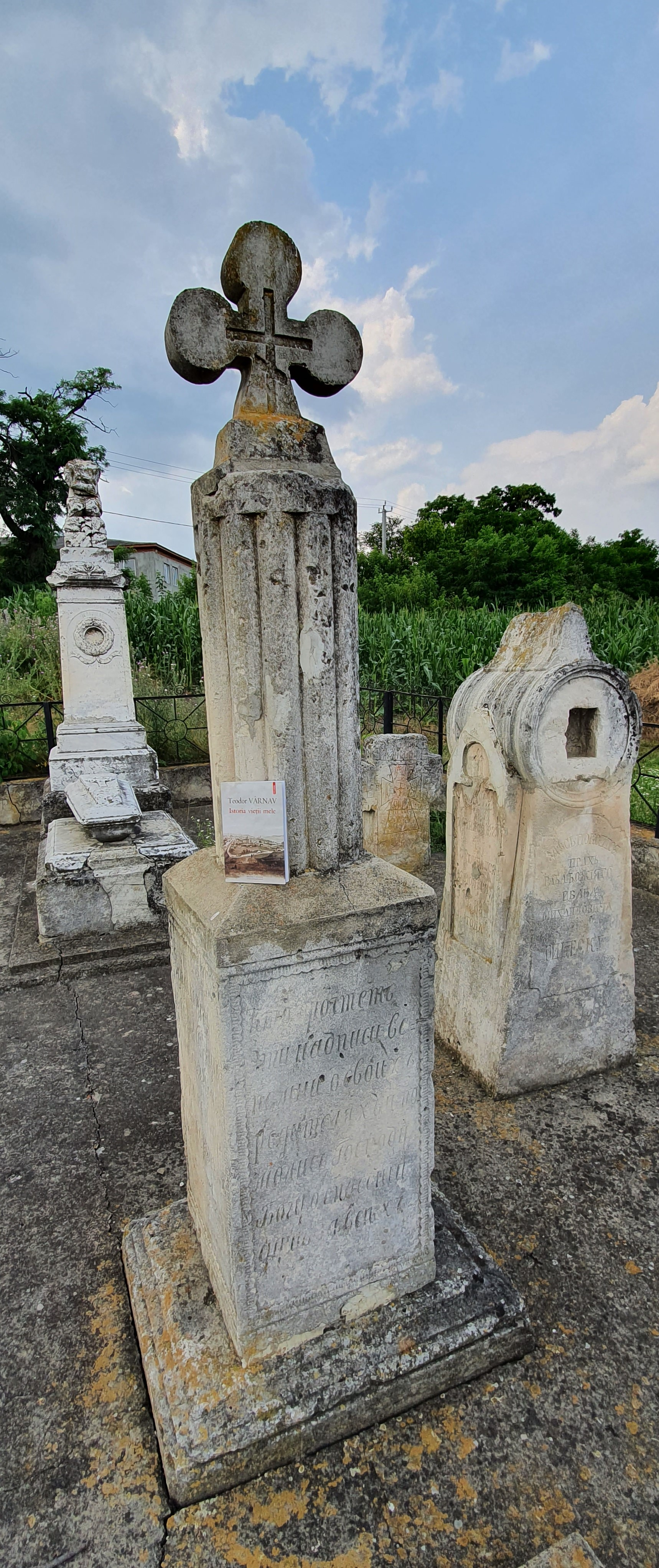
Grave of Teodor Vârnav in Pociumbeni

Theodor Vârnav was the first Moldavian memoirist.

He was the author of satirical works and lyrical poetry. Only the satire "Greedy Neighbor" has survived to the present day. He published in 1845 his autobiographical narrative "The Story of My Life". Folklorist A. Horovei, to whom the manuscript of this book came, published it in a separate edition in 1908. In the preface, he wrote that this work is "one of the few documents that illuminate our life at the beginning of the last century."

== Selected works ==
- «Istoria vieţii mele». Cu o pref. de Artur Gorovei, Buc, 1908
- «Istoria vieţii mele» (Fragmente), în vol.: Bogaci Gh., Istru B., Portnoi R. «Literatura moldovenească a veacului XIX» − Chişinău, 1951
