= Fetești (disambiguation) =

Fetești may refer to several places:

In Romania:

- Fetești, a city in Ialomița County, along with the attached village Fetești-Gară
- Fetești, a village in Scobinți Commune, Iași County
- Fetești, a village in Adâncata Commune, Suceava County
- Fetești, a village in Câmpuri Commune, Vrancea County

In Moldova:

- Fetești, a commune in Edineț District
