= Mina Polyanskaya =

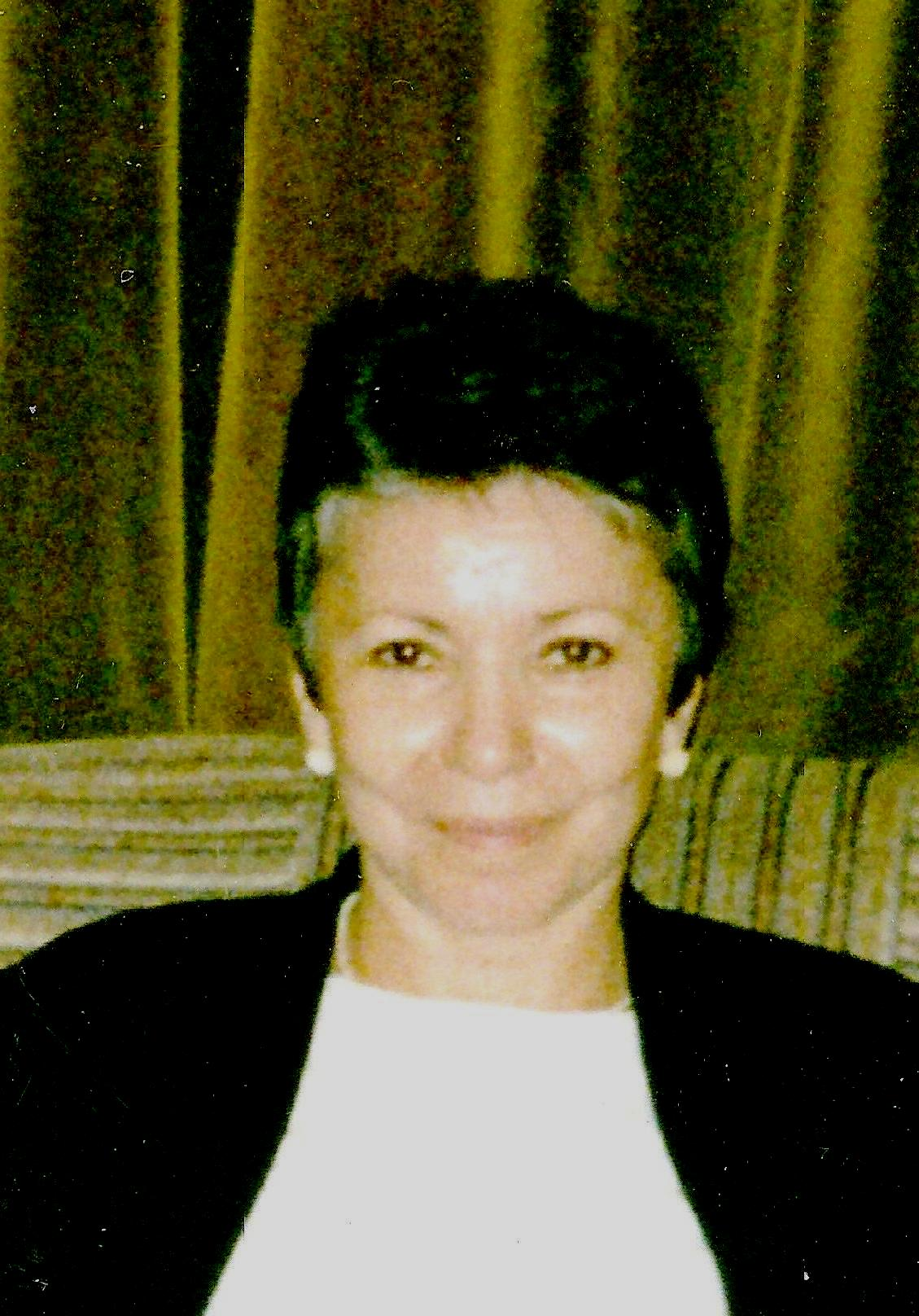
- Mina Polyanskaya in October 2016
- Born: 1945 (age 80–81); Rîșcani, Moldavian SSR, Soviet Union
- Education: Leningrad Pedagogical Institute
- Occupations: Poet; writer
- Spouse: Boris Antipov
- Partner: Igor Polyansky
- Writing career
- Genres: Prose, essay
- Notable awards: Korolenko Award; Voloshin Competition

Mina Iosifovna Polyanskaya (Russian: Мина Иосифовна Полянская: born in Rîșcani, Moldavian SSR on July 21, 1945) is a Russian writer, essayist and literary critic.

== Biography ==
=== Early life ===
Mina Polyanskaya was born in the Moldovan village of Rîșcani, to where her parents, originally from Bălți, returned from internal exile in Samarkand shortly before her birth. Her mother, Sima Ikhilevna Lerner, studied at a religious Jewish school in Bucharest; her father, Iosif Yankelevich Polyansky (1907-1953), studied in a Romanian gymnasium. Shortly after she was born, the family moved to Chernivtsi. In 1952, Iosif Polyansky was arrested, accused of listening to "foreign radio programs", but was soon released and asked to leave the city. In the same year, he and his family (three children) left for Bălți, where he died in January 1953. Mina Polyanskaya graduated from the high school № 16 (today the Cantemir Lyceum) in Balti, and left for Leningrad.

=== Career ===
Mina Polyanskaya is a graduate of the Philological Faculty of the Leningrad Pedagogical Institute, today the Herzen State Pedagogical University of Russia. After graduating, she studied for a year at the special courses institute "Petersburg-Leningrad Literary", with the specialization "Pushkin in St. Petersburg". She worked as a guide in the literary department of city tours in Leningrad.

She emigrated to Germany after the fall of the Soviet Union. In 1995, in Berlin, Polyanskaya, together with her husband Boris Antipov and her son Igor J. Polyansky, who is a professor at the University of Ulm, founded the cultural and political magazine "Зеркало Загадок". She has participated in cultural exchanges with German authors, in particular in the collection of the Senate of the Federal State of Berlin Das russische Berlin ("Russian Berlin", 2002).

Polyanskaya is a member of the German Pushkin Society, the German chapter of the PEN International association of writers, and the Union of Russian Writers.

== Works ==
- Одним Дыханьем с Ленинградом…. Leningrad, 1988 (essays on Alexei Tolstoy, Chapygin and Shishkov) ISBN 5-289-00393-2
- Классическое вино. Филологические экзерсисы, Sankt Peterburg, ArSIS, 1994 (вместе с И. Полянским) ISBN 5-85789-012-8
- Музы города. Берлин, Support Edition, 2000 ISBN 3-927869-13-9
- Брак мой тайный… Марина Цветаева в Берлине. Moscow, Veche, 2001. ISBN 5-7838-1028-2
- Я — писатель незаконный. Notes and reflections on the fate and work of Friedrich Gorenstein. New York. Slovo-Word, 2004 ISBN 1-930308-73-6
- Плацкарты и контрамарки. Notes on Friedrich Gorenstein. Saint Petersburg, Janus, 2006 ISBN 5-9276-0061-1
- Синдром Килиманджаро (novel). Saint Petersburg, Aleteya, 2008 ISBN 978-5-91419-069-6
- Медальон Мэри Шелли (novel). Saint Petersburg, Aleteya, 2008 ISBN 978-5-91419-069-6
- Флорентийские ночи в Берлине. Moscow, Golos-press / Helikon, Berlin, 2009 ISBN 978-5-7117-0547-5
- Foxtrot белого рыцаря. Андрей Белый в Берлине. Saint Petersburg, Demetra, 2009 ISBN 978-5-94459-023-7
- Берлинские записки о Фридрихе Горенштейне. Saint Petersburg, Demetra, 2011 ISBN 978-5-94459-030-5
- Зеркало Горация Уолпола (novel). Berlin, 2015.

== Awards ==
- Nominated for the 2009 Bunin Prize for the book Foxtrot белого рыцаря.
- Winner of the 8th International Voloshinsky Competition for 2010 in the category established by the Voprosy Literature magazine, Faces of Russian Literature (essays about Berkovsky: “Нужен красный Пинкертон” and “Смерть героя”).
- Laureate of the 9th International Voloshinsky Competition for 2011 in the "Newest Anthology" nomination (essay "Цена отщепенства". Based on the pages of Friedrich Gorenstein's novel "Место").
- Winner of the Competition. Korolenko, established by the Union of Petersburg Writers, 2012, for the story "Андреевская лента".
- Diploma of the winner of the competition "Author of the Year" of the network portal Заметки по еврейской истории. January 2014.
