= Valentina Tăzlăuanu =

Moldovan writer and journalist (1950–2020)

- Born: 5 January 1950; Druţa, Moldavian SSR, Soviet Union
- Died: 3 June 2020 (aged 70); Chișinău, Moldova
- Education: Moldova State University
- Occupations: Writer, journalist
- Known for: Literary and journalistic activity

Valentina Tăzlăuanu (5 January 1950 – 3 June 2020) was a writer (essayist), journalist and theatre critic from the Republic of Moldova. She was the editor in chief of Sud-Est. She worked for Radio Moldova, as Senior Editor at the Committee for Book Publishing, as Chief of Arts Department at Literatura şi Arta magazine (1977–1990) and Deputy Minister of Culture (1997–2000). She was a member of the Moldovan Writers' Union and the Romanian Writers' Union, and Secretary of PEN Club Moldova. She published three collections of essays between 1991 and 2011.

== Life ==
Valentina Tăzlăuanu was born on 5 January 1950 in Druţă, Râşcani district. She graduated from Moldova State University in 1971, where she majored in journalism. She earned a master of arts degree in 2009. She was a writer (essayist), journalist and theatre critic. She worked for Radio Moldova, as Senior Editor at the Committee for Book Publishing, as Chief of Arts Department at Literatura şi Arta magazine (1977–1990). From 1997 to 200 she was the Deputy Minister of Culture for Moldova. She was the editor in chief of the magazine Sud-Est, of which she was also the co-founder in 1990. The magazine was described as a 'cultural institution'. She published three collections of essays, in 1991, 2005 and 2011. She was described as "one of the best theatre critics in Moldova".

She was also a member of the Moldovan Writers' Union and the Writers' Union of Romania, as well as a member of the theatre union of Moldova. She was a member and Secretary of PEN Club Moldova.

She died on the 3 June 2020 at the age of seventy.

== Awards ==
- Maestru în Artă, 2009.

== Works ==
- "Măsura de prezenţă", essays, ed. Hyperion, 1991;
- "Discursuri paralele", essays, ed. Cartier, 2005;
- "Lumea după Hamlet", essays, Chişinău, 2011.
