= Rîșcani District =

Coordinates: 47°55′N 27°25′E

Rîșcani District Raionul Rîșcani
- District (Raion)
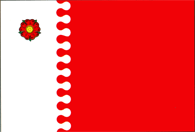
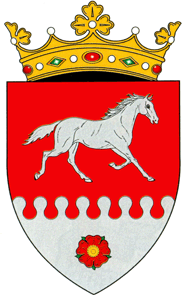
- Flag Coat of arms

- Country: Republic of Moldova
- Administrative center (Oraș-reședință): Rîșcani
- Established: 2002

Government
  - District president: Vladimir Mizdrenco (PSRM)

Area
  - Total: 936 km^{2} (361 sq mi)
  - Water: 40 km^{2} (15 sq mi) 4.27%
- Elevation: 280 m (920 ft)

Population (2024)
  - Total: 43,652
  - Density: 46.6/km^{2} (121/sq mi)
- Time zone: UTC+2 (EET)
  - Summer (DST): UTC+3 (EEST)
- Area code: +373 56
- Car plates: RS
- Website: Official website

Rîșcani (Romanian pronunciation: [rɨʃˈkanʲ]) is a district (Romanian: raion) in north-western Moldova, with its administrative center in Rîșcani. The district also includes the town of Costești.

== History ==
Near the town of Costești, there are traces of a settlement that once belonged to the Golden Horde but was abandoned around 1360. The cities with the earliest historical records are Horodiște, Recea, and Șaptebani, which are mentioned in sources dating from 1429 to 1437. In the following centuries, the district developed both economically and culturally. In 1812, following the Treaty of Bucharest, both Bessarabia and the district came under Russian occupation (1812–1918). During this period, the district was actively colonized by Ukrainian, Russian, German, and Hebrew populations, who established their own villages.

On 27 March 1918, expressing the will of the people and by virtue of history and nation, the representatives unanimously voted for the Union of Bessarabia with Romania. Following the pact between Hitler and Stalin on 26 June 1940, the fate of Bessarabia was decided by military force. On 22 June 1941 began 1,418 days and nights of fierce and bloody fighting between the Germans and Soviets.

== Geography ==
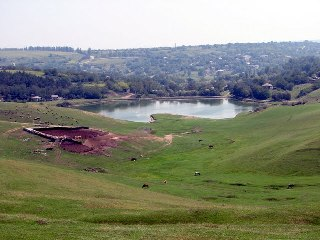
Typical relief in the district

Located in northern Moldova, the district borders Edineț and Dondușeni to the north, Drochia and Sîngerei to the east, Municipality of Bălți and Glodeni to the south, and Romania to the west. The district is located on the Northern Moldavian Plateau, characterized by gently undulating relief and weak erosion processes. Chernozem soils cover the majority of the district. Natural resources include limestone, clay, sand, and gravel, found near the villages of Druța, Corlăteni, Braniște, and Șaptebani. The maximum altitude in the district is 280 m, near the village of Pociumbeni.

=== Climate ===
The district has a temperate-continental climate with an average annual temperature of 10 °C (50 °F). The average temperature in July is 20 °C (68 °F), while in January it is around −5 °C (23 °F). Annual rainfall ranges from 400 to 550 mm. The average wind speed is 3–5 m/s.

=== Fauna ===
The fauna of the district consists of various mammals, birds, reptiles, and other animals. In the forests, there are wild boars, deer, foxes, rabbits, badgers, and numerous small rodents, as well as birds such as nightingales, woodpeckers, hoopoes, goldfinches, and jays. Reptiles include the European green lizard, water snakes, and vipers. The district's rivers and lakes are home to otters, muskrats, ducks, coots, loons, geese, swans, and a variety of fish such as perch, bream, catfish, carp, crucian carp, and gudgeons.

=== Flora ===
Forests cover about 5.7% of the district's territory, a relatively small area but one that supports a diverse range of plant species. The main trees include oak, common oak, silver linden, chestnut, cherry, and others. Common plants found in the area include fescue, clover, sedge, burdock, and various other species.

=== Rivers ===
The district's water system is part of the Black Sea basin. Several rivers flow through the district, including the Prut (forming the border with Romania), Ciuhur, Camenca, and the Răut with its tributary, Copăceanca. In 1978, construction was completed on the Costești–Stânca Hydroelectric Complex (a joint project between the USSR and Romania), with a capacity of 32 MW. The reservoir serving the hydroelectric station covers an area of 59 km^{2} and holds about 1.28 billion m^{3} of water.

=== Protected areas ===
- Butești Keys
- Duruitoarea Gorge
- Lucăceni Nature Reserve
- Pociumbeni Nature Reserve
- Proscureni Reef
- Șaptebani Nature Reserve
- Stânca Nature Reserve
- Văratic Gorge

== Administrative subdivisions ==
- Localities: 55
  - Cities: Rîșcani, Costești
  - Communes: 26
  - Villages: 27

== Demographics ==
According to the 2024 census, 43,652 inhabitants lived in Rîșcani District, a decrease compared to the previous census in 2014, when 59,226 inhabitants were registered.

Ethnic composition of Rîșcani District (2024)
1. Moldovans (Note: There is an ongoing controversy regarding the ethnic identification of Moldovans and Romanians.) (77.6%)
2. Romanians (3.30%)
3. Ukrainians (14.8%)
4. Russians (2.10%)
5. Romani (1.70%)
6. Others (0.40%)
Linguistic composition of Rîșcani District (2024)
1. Moldovan (Note: In March 2023, the Parliament of Moldova passed a law updating all legislative texts and the constitution to refer to the national language as Romanian, effectively rendering the term "Moldovan" obsolete.) (60.0%)
2. Romanian (15.8%)
3. Ukrainian (11.7%)
4. Russian (10.7%)
5. Romani (1.60%)
6. Other (0.20%)

Historical population
Year	Pop.	±%
2004	69,454	—
2014	59,226	−14.7%
2024	43,652	−26.3%

=== Religion ===
- Christian Orthodox - 95.3%
- Pentecostals - 1.4%
- Jehovah's Witnesses - 1.0%
- Other - 1.6%
- Irreligious - 0.3%
- Not stated - 0.4%

== Economy ==
A total of about 15,300 people are employed in the district's businesses. Agriculture is the main economic sector, covering 81.8% of the total land area. The principal crops include cereals (wheat, barley, oats), industrial crops such as sunflower, tobacco, and sugar beet, as well as various vegetables. Orchards — primarily of apple, cherry, and plum trees — occupy 4.3% of the district's territory.

== Education ==
In the district, 35 primary and secondary educational institutions are operating, including 2 elementary schools, 24 gymnasiums, and 9 lyceums. Additionally, there is an agro college, a vocational school, an auxiliary school, a sports school, a creative center, and 44 preschool institutions.

== Politics ==
Rîșcani District is located in the so-called “Red North” region, where the PCRM and other pro-Russian political movements have traditionally performed strongly. In recent years, however, the district's political landscape has become somewhat more balanced.

Summary of the 28 September 2025 parliamentary election in Rîșcani District
Parties and coalitions	Votes	%	+/−
Patriotic Electoral Bloc	9,290	40.46	-1.21
Party of Action and Solidarity	6,877	29.95	-2.06
Our Party	2,592	11.29	+2.43
Alternative	1,561	6.80	new
Democracy at Home Party	1,137	4.95	+3.85
Other	1,505	6.55	-9.81
Total (turnout 47.01%)	23,467	100.00	

== Culture ==
In Rîșcani District, there are 96 cultural institutions, including 6 houses of culture, 37 clubs, 52 libraries, and 1 museum. There are 160 artistic groups, 19 of which hold the title of “model ensemble.”

== Health ==
The district has a hospital with 250 beds, as well as a general family medicine center with 18 family doctor offices, 8 health centers, and 20 medical points.

== Personalities ==
- Leonid Bujor – Politician, Minister of Education of the Republic of Moldova (2009–2011)
- Victor Catan – Minister of Internal Affairs of the Republic of Moldova (1998–1999, 2009–2011)
- Eugenio Coșeriu – Romance philologist, honorary member of the Romanian Academy from 1963, and professor at Tübingen, Germany until his retirement in 1991
- Liviu Damian – Poet and essayist
- Mircea Druc – Politician, Prime Minister of the Moldovan SSR (1990 – 1991)
- Alexandru Moșanu – Politician, historian, and professor; President of the Moldovan Parliament (1990–1993)
- Gherman Pântea – Bessarabian and Romanian politician; Mayor of Chișinău (1923, 1927–1928, 1932) and Mayor of Odessa (1941–1944)
- Anatol Șalaru – Politician, Minister of Transport and Road Infrastructure (2009–2013), Minister of Defense (2015–2016) of the Republic of Moldova, and former vice-president of the Liberal Party
- Gheorghe Tudor – Bessarabian and Romanian politician
- Spiridon Vangheli – Writer and children's author, best known for creating the beloved character Guguță
