= Glodeanca River =

Glodeancu River

Physical characteristics
- Source
  - location: Lupăria, Rîșcani district
  - length: 30 km

Glodeanca is a river in the Republic of Moldova, a right tributary of the Căldărușa River. It rises near the village of Lupăria, Rîșcani district, and flows southwest. The average width of the riverbed is 2-4 m, the depth - 0.5 m, the speed of the watercourse varies between 0.1-0.3 m/s. In dry years, some sectors of the riverbed dry up completely.

== Ecology ==
Between 2018 and 2020, a pilot project led to the planting of 9 hectares of riparian protection strips along the Glodeanca River, a tributary of the Camenca River in the Glodeni district. Implemented by the Women's Association for Environmental Protection and Sustainable Development with international and local support, the initiative achieved high survival rates for the saplings, ranging between 66% and 90%. These ecological efforts laid the foundation for a local ecological corridor designed to protect water resources from evaporation and establish a connection with the "Pădurea Domnească" scientific reserve.

=== Catastrophe ===
An ecological incident occurred in Glodeni when a crack in the accumulation basin of the local sugar factory caused a major wastewater spill. Approximately 8,000 cubic meters of wastewater leaked within a two-hour timeframe, flooding parts of the city and flowing directly into the Glodeanca River. The incident prompted authorities to issue public warnings advising residents not to consume water from local wells. In response to the environmental damage and strong unpleasant odors that spread throughout the city, the administration of the sugar factory was fined 10,000 lei, while soil and water samples were collected to determine the full extent of the environmental impact.
