= Sud-Est (magazine) =

- Editor-in-chief: Valentina Tăzlauanu
- Staff writers: Eugen Lungu, Victor Gherman (secretary), Mihai Cimpoi, Emil Galaicu-Paun, Serafim Saka, Leo Butnaru, Mircea V. Ciobanu, Constantin I. Ciobanu, Arcadie Suceveanu
- Founded: 1977
- Language: Romanian
- Headquarters: Chișinău
- Website: www.sud-est.md

Sud-Est (Romanian for "South-East") is a magazine from Chișinău, Moldova. Valentina Tăzlauanu is the editor in chief. It is published quarterly and covers topics on culture and civilization.
