= Recea, Rîșcani =

Recea
- Commune
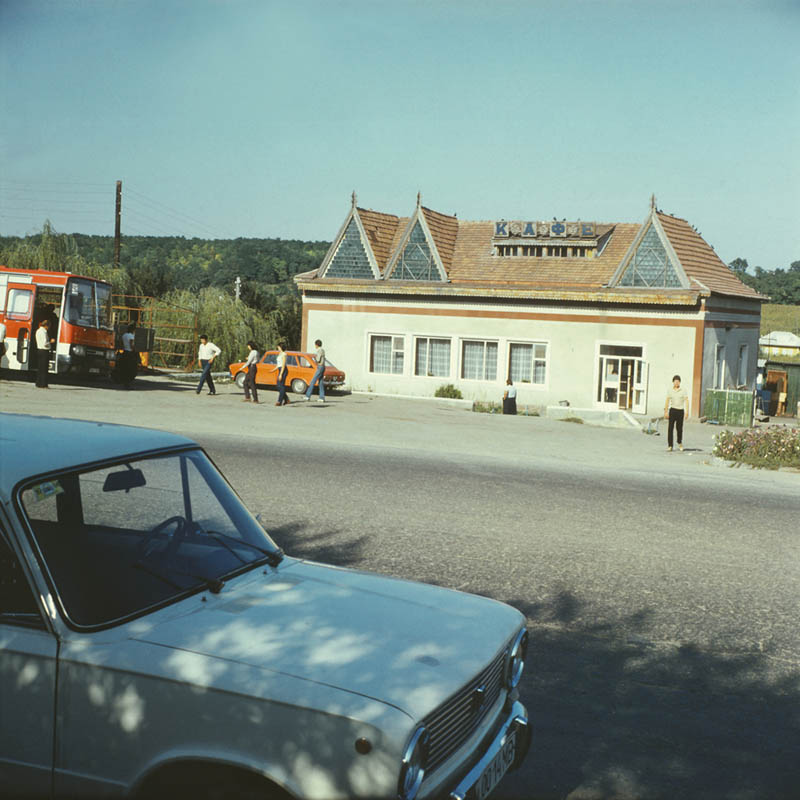

- Location within Moldova
- Coordinates: 47.8963888889°N 27.6719444444°E
- Country: Moldova
- District: Rîșcani District

Government
  - Mayor: Valeriu Ghelan

Population (2014)
  - Total: 2,855
- Time zone: UTC+2 (EET)
  - Summer (DST): UTC+3 (EEST)

Recea is a commune in Rîșcani District, Moldova. It is composed of three villages: Recea, Slobozia-Recea and Sverdiac.
