= Liviu Damian =

- Born: 13 March 1935; Corlăteni, Rîșcani
- Died: 20 July 1986 (aged 51); Chişinău

Liviu Damian (13 March 1935 – 20 July 1986) was a Romanian essayist, journalist, poet, and translator from the Republic of Moldova, active in the 1960s.

A street in Durlești, Chișinău, is named after him, as well as the Liviu Damian lyceum in Rîșcani.

== Works ==
- Darul fecioarei (1963)
- Sunt verb (1968)
- Partea noastră de zbor (1974)
- De-a Baba-Oarba (1977)
- Mândrie şi răbdare (1977)
- Altoi pe o tulpină vorbitoare (1978)
- Salcâmul din prag (1979)
- Inima şi tunetul (1981)
- Coroana de umbră (1982)
- Scrieri alese, I, II (1985)
- Poezii şi poeme (1986)
