= Brînzeni =

- Village
- Location within Edineț
- Coordinates: 48°5′0″N 27°10′28″E
- Country: Moldova

Government
  - Mayor: Liviu Cibotaroș (PDM)
- Elevation: 147 m (482 ft)

Population (2014 census)
  - Total: 1,494
- Time zone: UTC+2 (EET)
  - Summer (DST): UTC+3 (EEST)
- Postal code: MD-4619

Brînzeni is a village in Edineț District, Moldova.
