= Alexandru Oleinic =

Moldovan politician

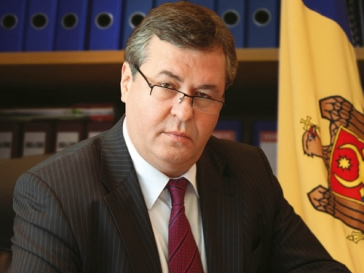
- Oleinic in 2014

Member of the Moldovan Parliament
- In office 9 March 2019 – 23 July 2021
- Constituency: Transnistria
- Majority: 10,463 (62.5%)
- In office 25 February 2001 – 22 April 2009
- Parliamentary group: Braghiș Alliance; Our Moldova Alliance

Minister of Information Technology and Communications
- In office 25 September 2009 – 14 January 2011
- President: Mihai Ghimpu (acting); Vladimir Filat (acting); Marian Lupu (acting)
- Prime Minister: Vladimir Filat
- Preceded by: Pavel Buceațchi
- Succeeded by: Pavel Filip

Personal details
- Born: 8 December 1959 (age 66) Cupcini, Moldavian SSR, Soviet Union (now Moldova)
- Party: Party Alliance Our Moldova; Alliance for European Integration (2009–present)
- Other political affiliations: Alliance for Democracy and Reforms
- Education: Technical University of Moldova; Moldova State University
- Profession: economist, engineer

Alexandru Oleinic (born 8 December 1959) is a Moldovan politician, who was elected as a deputy in the Parliament of the Republic of Moldova in two consecutive legislatures between 2001 and 2009, on the lists of the Electoral Bloc Democratic Moldova. Between 2009 and 2011 he was Minister of Information Technologies and Communications of the Republic of Moldova in the First Vlad Filat Cabinet.

On November 17, 2012, at the 2nd Congress of the People's Party of Moldova, he was elected as a co-chairing coordinator. He is the founder of the "Youth for Moldova" charity fund and the founder of the Institute of Political and Social Technologies, the president of the "National Fund for Investment Attraction and Protection" and the chairperson of the board of directors of the "Millennium Management Group".

== Biography ==
Alexandru Oleinic was born on December 8, 1959, in Cupcini. He is a member of the Party Alliance Our Moldova.

== Education ==
- 1966-1976: General School of Cupcini, Edineț District.
- 1976-1981: Polytechnic Institute of Chișinău, Faculty of Mechanics
- 1985-1988: State University of Moldova, Faculty of Economic Sciences

== Professional activity ==
- 1982-1996: started at the position of the foreman and ended up as a general manager of SA "Monolit" (Soroca);
- 1996- 1998: General Manager of the Tractor Plant in Chișinău SA "TRACOM";
- 1998-2000: General Manager of the State Property Administration and Privatization Department;
- 2000-2001: General Manager of the National Investment Agency;
- 2001-2005: Member of the Parliament of the Republic of Moldova, Member of the Commission for Economic Policy, Budget and Finance;
- 2005-2009: Member of the Parliament of the Republic of Moldova, Member of the Commission for Social Protection, Health and Family;
- On September 25, 2009, by the Decree of the President of the Republic of Moldova No 4 - V, the Minister of Information Technologies and Communications.
- 2009- 2011: Minister of Information Technologies and Communications;
- 2012–present: President of the "National Fund for Investment Promotion and Protection";
- 2013–present: Chairman of the Management Board of "Milenium Management Group";

== Political activity ==
- 1997- 2002: run for the parliament election on the lists of the Social Democratic Party "Ant". Member of the National Council of the Social Democratic Party "Ant";
- 2001-2005: Elected to the Parliament on the list of electoral block "Braghiș Alliance". Member of the Committee on Economic Policy, Budget and Finance;
- 2002-2003: Member of the National Council of the Social Democratic Alliance of Moldova;
- 2003- 2011: Member of the National Council "Our Moldova" Alliance;
- 2005-2009: MP in the Parliament of the Republic of Moldova – Democratic Moldova Electoral Bloc. Member of the Commission for Social Protection, Health and Family;
- 2007-2009: Member of the Inter-Parliamentary Commission Russia-Moldova. Member of the OSCE Parliamentary Assembly;
- 2012: Co-chairman of the People's Party of Moldova.

== Social work and honors ==
- 2005: established "Youth for Moldova" charity foundation
- 2009: One of the founders of the Institute of Political and Social Technologies
- On December 1, 2009, Alexander Oleinic was awarded the Medal of Honor for his exceptional government activity in promoting democratic reforms and legislation.
- 2010: Initiator and organizer of the "IYouth - The Future Starts With You" National Contest. He also holds the first contest. He was awarded the Medal of BOFR, BOU, and the Orthodox Church of Moldova.

== Family ==
Alexandru Oleinic is married and has a child.
