= Zăbriceni =

- Commune
- Location within Moldova
- Coordinates: 48°4′20″N 27°15′12″E
- Country: Moldova
- District: Edineț District

Government
  - Mayor: Mihail Gîra (PCRM)

Area
  - Total: 4,568 km^{2} (1,764 sq mi)
- Elevation: 210 m (690 ft)

Population (2014)
  - Total: 2,147
- Time zone: UTC+2 (EET)
  - Summer (DST): UTC+3 (EEST)
- Postal code: MD-4646

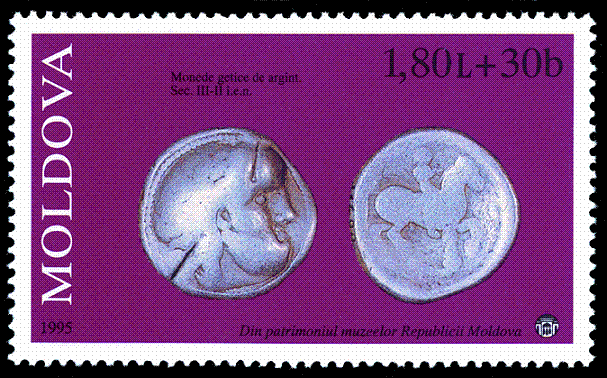
Getic silver coins (3rd to 2nd century BC). The treasure was discovered in 1972 near the village of Zabriceni

Zăbriceni is a commune in Edineț District, Moldova. It is composed of two villages, Onești and Zăbriceni.
