= Stroescu =

Stroescu is a Romanian surname. Notable people with the surname include:

- Silvia Stroescu (born 1985), Romanian artistic gymnast
- Vasile Stroescu (1845–1926), Romanian politician, landowner, and philanthropist
