= Trinca, Edineț =

Trinca
- Village
- Location within Edineț Location within Moldova
- Coordinates: 48°12′41″N 27°6′49″E
- Country: Moldova

Government
  - Mayor: Anatolie Gudumac (PDM)
- Elevation: 180 m (590 ft)

Population (2014 census)
  - Total: 2,863
- Time zone: UTC+2 (EET)
  - Summer (DST): UTC+3 (EEST)
- Postal code: MD-4644

Trinca is a village in Edineț District, Moldova.
