= Șaptebani =

- Village
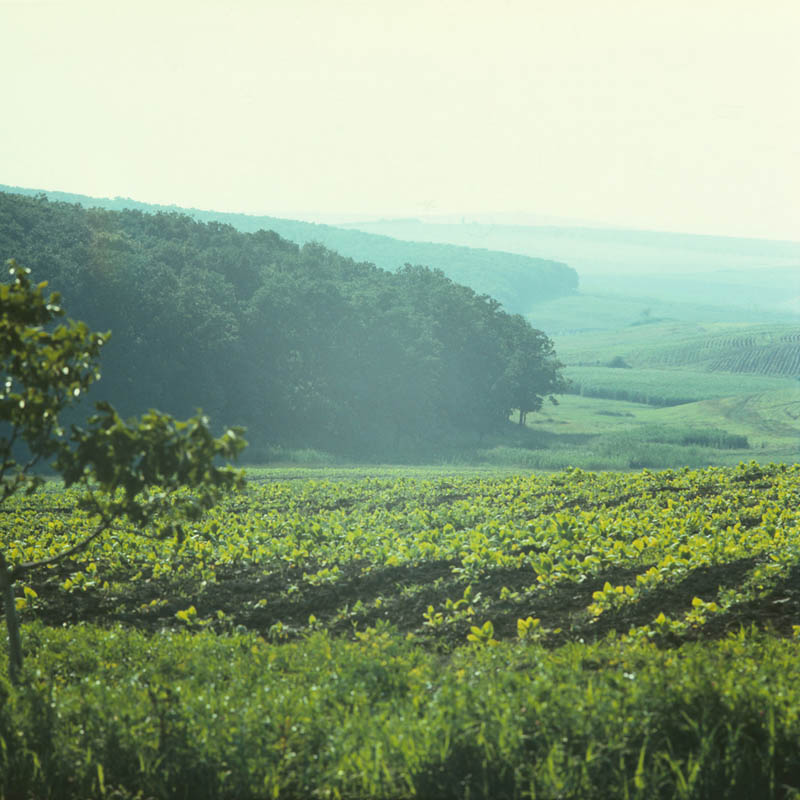

- Location in Moldova
- Coordinates: 47°54′N 27°21′E
- Country: Moldova
- District: Rîșcani District

Population (2014 census)
  - Total: 1,465
- Time zone: UTC+2 (EET)
  - Summer (DST): UTC+3 (EEST)

Șaptebani is a village in Rîșcani District, Moldova. The village centre is located at an altitude of 171 meters.

Șaptebani was first mentioned in documents in 1425. There is a World War II memorial in the central square. The local geography of open plains broken by rolling hills and gullies show a major tank battle, with many thousands killed. After the war, some of the local inhabitants were deported to Siberia for up to 15 years. In an unusual gesture, the local school conferred honorary degrees on the returnees.

A wooden church was built between 1904 and 1906. The entrance has a large Byzantine-style painting on the town on a mural in tempera, without knowing painter. In 1944, when the Soviet Army entered the area, the church was closed, and the priest was intimidated and abused. Although it reopened for a short period in 1954–1957, it closed in 1957 upon the death of the priest, although it finally reopened in autumn 1990.

== Notable people ==
- Gheorghe Tudor
