= 1970 floods in Romania =

Natural disaster in Romania

- Flood victims attempting to move about in Alba Iulia, May 1970

Meteorological history
- Duration: May–June 1970

Overall effects
- Fatalities: 209
- Damage: $500 million – $1 billion
- Areas affected: Romania

The 1970 floods in Romania, brought on by river swelling caused by torrential rains, high winds and a heat wave that melted snow in the Carpathian Mountains, were the worst in modern Romanian history in loss of life, and caused the most damage up to the 2006 floods: at least $500 million; perhaps over $1 billion.

== Flooding ==
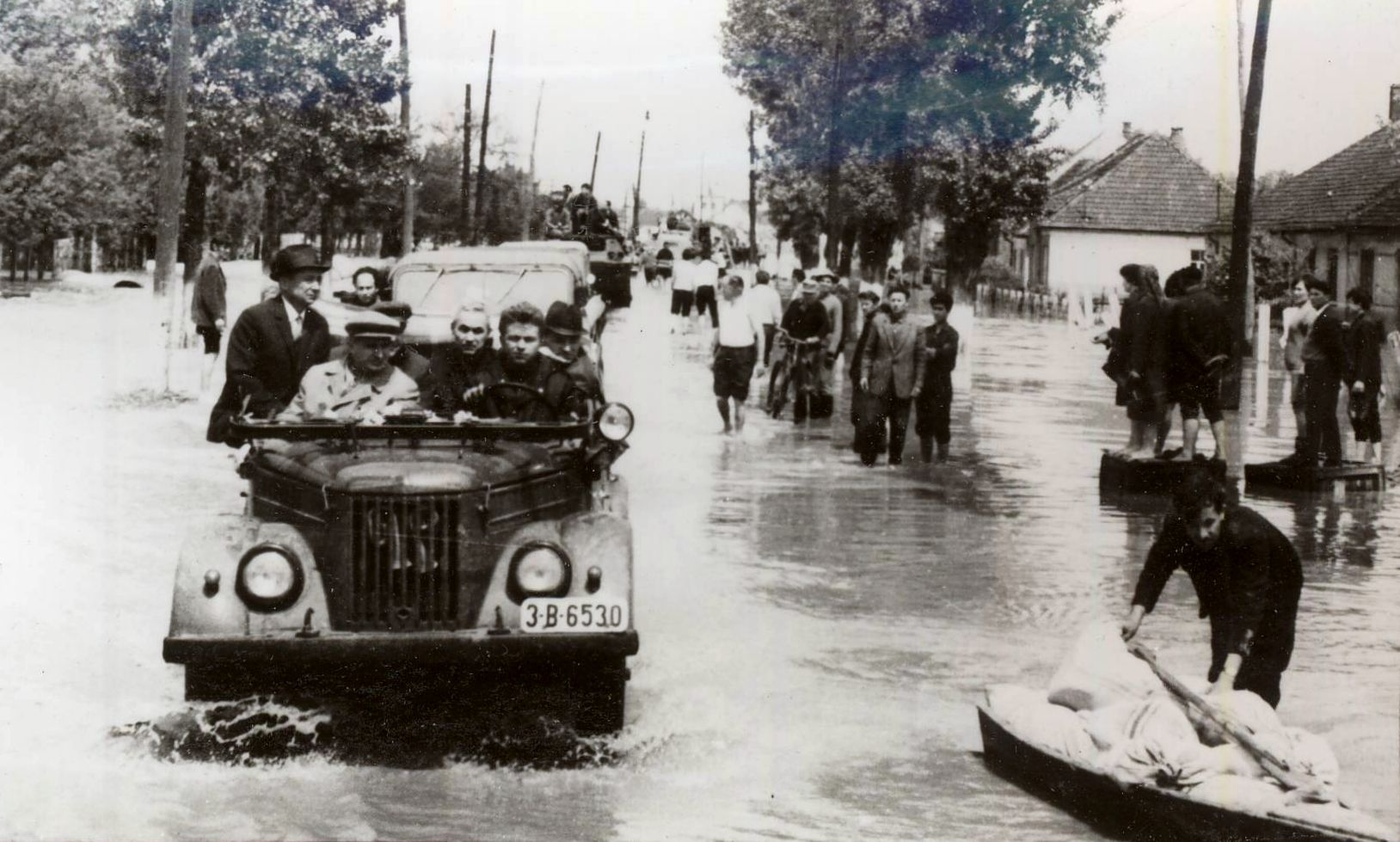
Nicolae Ceaușescu (at left, wearing a cap) riding through Satu Mare two days after it was devastated by floods.

The floods began around May 12 and lasted into mid-June. 209 people were killed, 41,000 houses were damaged or totally destroyed (leaving at least 265,000 homeless), over a million arable acres were inundated, over 100,000 sheep, pigs, cows and chickens (including over 35,000 head of cattle) drowned, 146 factories were idled at least temporarily, and over 250 miles (400 km) of highway required repair. At least 240,000 people were evacuated, some repeatedly. Thirty-seven of Romania's then 39 counties were severely damaged, with 230 towns and villages hit in just the first twelve days, including Sighișoara and Mediaș, the women and children of which were evacuated to centres in hill villages while the men salvaged possessions. Airports, including those at Sibiu and Satu Mare, were flooded and closed. Railway systems were damaged, and landslides blocked roads and carried away telegraph lines.

Broadly speaking, floodwaters moved from the northern and central regions toward the Danube lowlands in the south and east. The Prahova, Târnava, Olt (threatening Râmnicu Vâlcea and Slatina) and Tisza rivers were among those affected, as well as the Danube (which rose up to 6½ ft above normal spring high-water levels, flooding docks and port installations in Turnu Severin), Prut and Siret. As crests rolled onward, downstream localities knew to fear the worst: for instance, Galați and Brăila knew by June 3 that floods from three weeks earlier would reach them on June 11, the question being if their dikes would hold. The neighbouring Soviet Union and Bulgaria were not nearly as threatened, as the Prut and Danube banks are steep and high on their shores. The floods also came in phases: for instance, the waters were just beginning to recede when on May 23–24 renewed heavy rain and snowfalls raised their level again.

Significant resources were mobilised to fight the waters and their effects. Medical teams toured most areas of the country warning people not to drink polluted water (many drinking water installations were destroyed) and inoculating all citizens aged 2 to 55 against typhoid fever. Thousands of soldiers and civilians worked around the clock to build miles of new dikes and reinforce old ones.

== Political ramifications and international response ==
The floods had political ramifications as well. General Secretary Nicolae Ceaușescu took personal direction of some emergency measures in the Brăila and Galați areas, particularly sensitive because their heavy industry and grain shipping centres are near the Danube, Prut and Siret, all three of which were swollen and which merge four miles (6 km) upstream from Galați. On May 22, wearing a black turtleneck sweater, workman's cloth cap and farmer's jacket, Ceaușescu and high Romanian Communist Party leaders spent hours superintending the completion of a five-mile (8 km)-long earth and timber dike at Brăila. In foreign policy, the floods offered him an opportunity to continue Romania's independent foreign policy, which sought to keep its distance from the Soviet Union. While at the height of the floods, he made a sudden trip to Moscow, followed a week later by Prime Minister Ion Gheorghe Maurer, this worried Romanians and Ceaușescu then toured the country, saying over and over in speeches to flood victims that his policy remained unchanged—national independence and sovereignty, noninterference in the internal affairs of other states, equality between governments and between Communist parties, and the right of each party to shape its own policies.

The provision of foreign aid also reflected this independent course. The single largest relief payment, the equivalent of $400,000, came from the People's Republic of China, then embroiled in the Sino-Soviet split. The first relief plane came from Israel; Romania was the only Eastern Bloc country to have relations with Israel at the time. Aid from the United States and the Netherlands soon followed, but a week passed before the USSR sent a message and an offer of aid. Moreover, Western companies offered to repair or replace damaged industrial equipment they had furnished: the Galați iron and steel plant (Romania's largest) was built with Western expertise and equipment against Soviet opposition. Over a dozen countries, including France and Yugoslavia, gave aid. British aid organisations promised 50 tons of food, children's clothing and medicine, while West Germany sent a number of mobile water-purification units. A special fund was set up in Bucharest to assist flood victims; money poured in from factory groups throughout Romania. In one Bucharest institute, 100 donors a day gave blood, while scores of foreign diplomats gave clothing and household items.

== Aftermath ==
Reflecting a drive for development and modernisation, the regime embarked upon a national land-improvement programme following the floods, covering drainage, irrigation, soil erosion, navigation, power, research and training in a comprehensive approach that departed from mere reliance upon control structures. Not only did Romania cope with the floods; it brought in specifically designed alleviative and preventive measures. The floods were mentioned in at least one literary work: Marin Sorescu's 1976 play Matca ("The Matrix"). During the rains, a woman gives birth to her child while her father is dying in an adjacent room. As the waters close in on her, her sole thought is to raise the baby above her head in an effort to save it.

The main goal of building the Stânca-Costești Dam, completed in 1978, was to protect villages down the Prut river from floods.

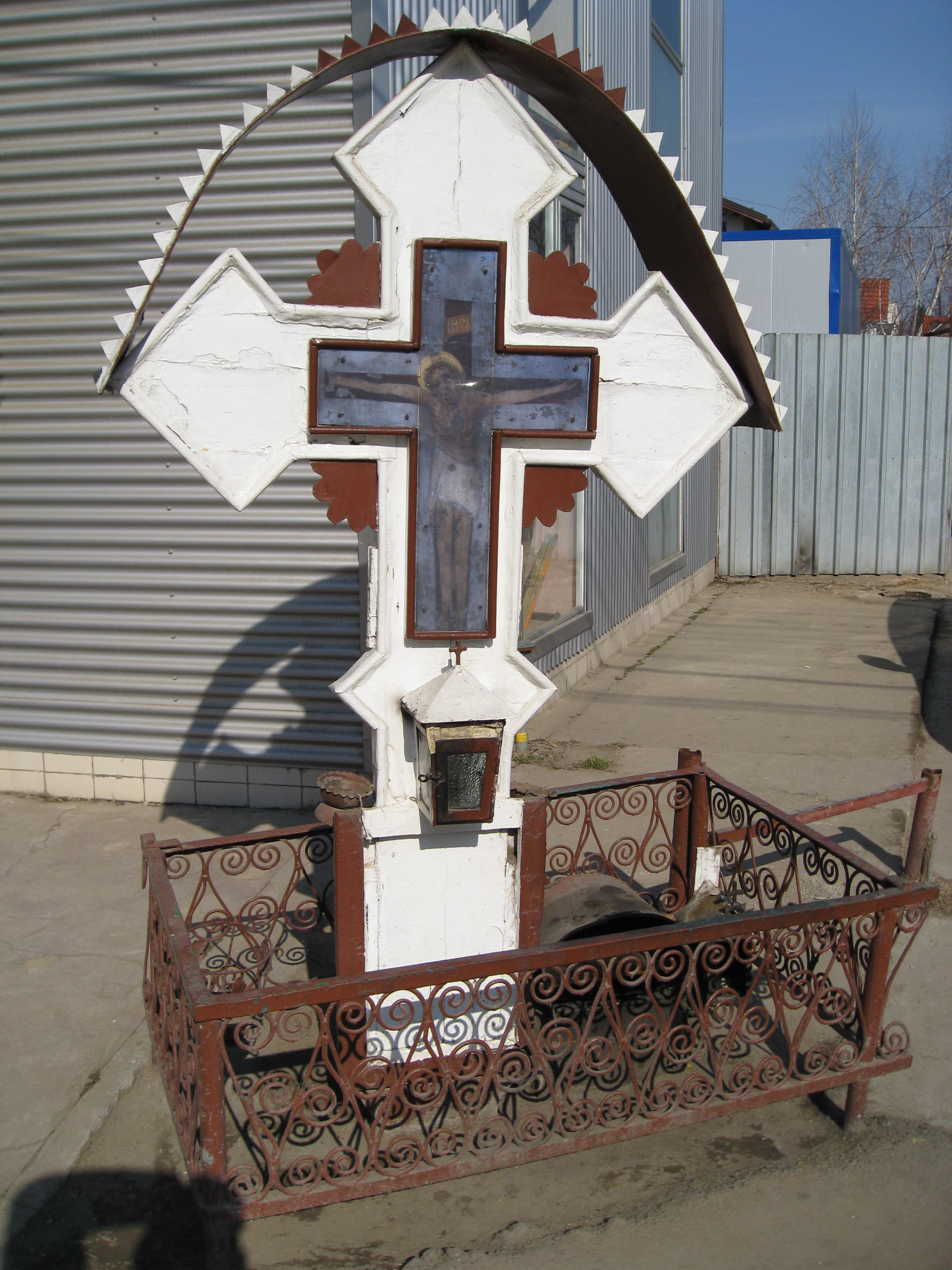
A memorial cross to the victims, raised in Militari, Bucharest, soon after the floods.

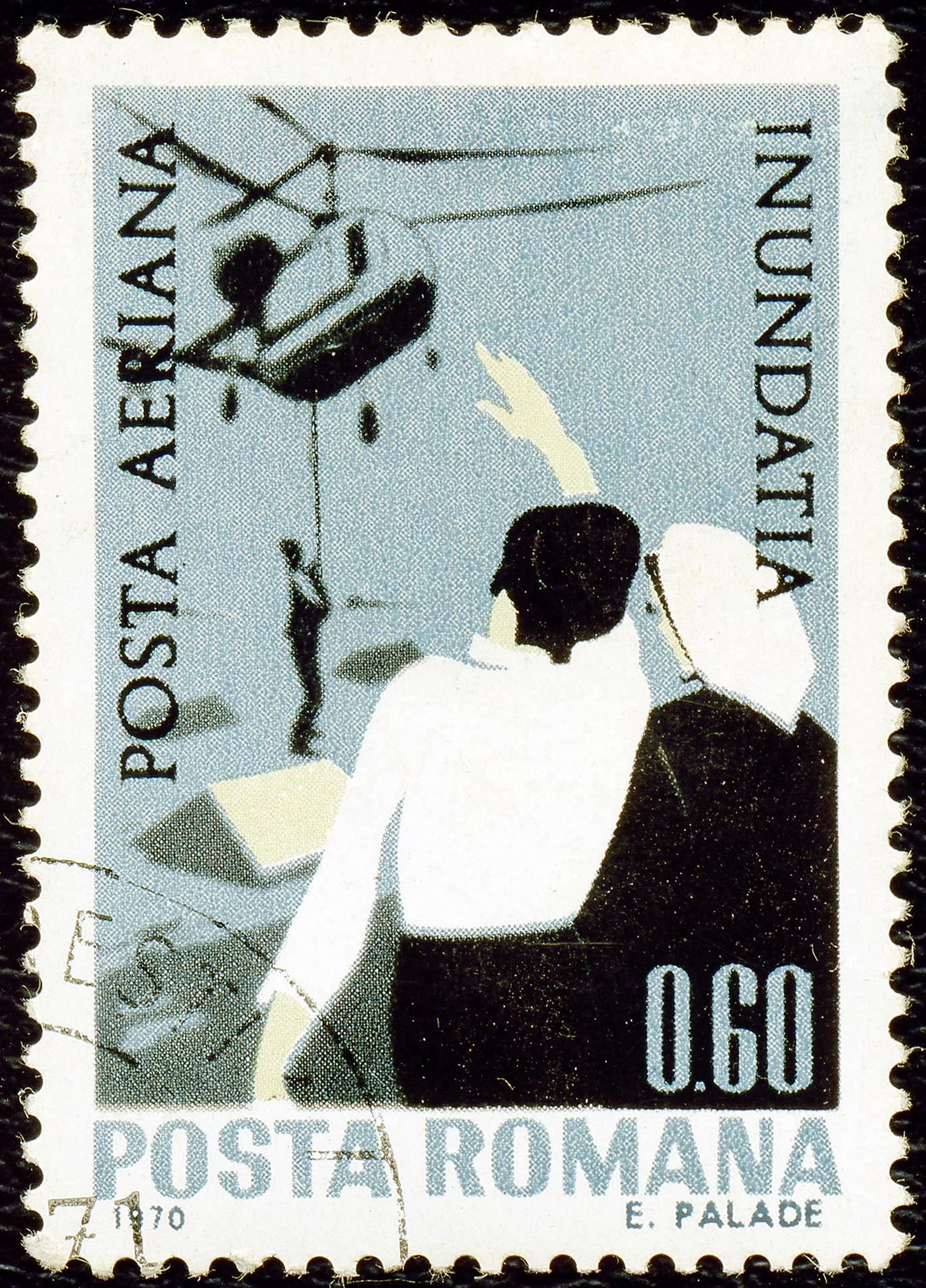
1970 airmail stamp
