= Gheorghe Tudor =

Bessarabian politician (1885–1974)

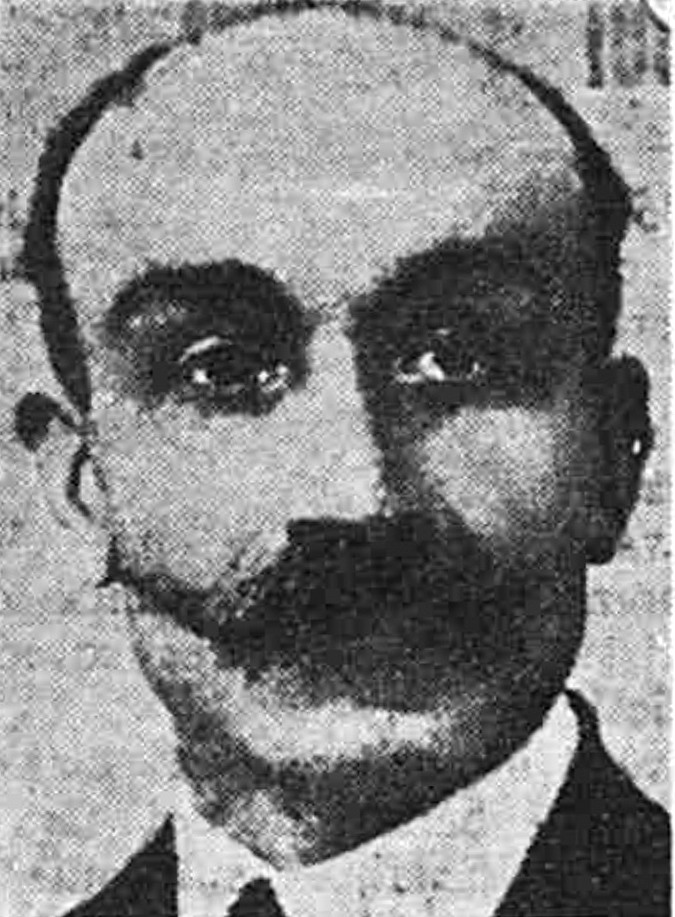
- Tudor in 1938

Member of the Moldovan Parliament
- In office 21 November 1917 – 27 November 1918

Personal details
- Born: Șaptebani

Gheorghe Tudor (1 February 1885, Șaptebani – 7 December 1974, Bucharest) was a Bessarabian politician.

== Career ==
He served as Member of the Moldovan Parliament (1917–1918). He voted for the Union of Bessarabia with Romania.

== Gallery ==
Moldovan stamp, 1998

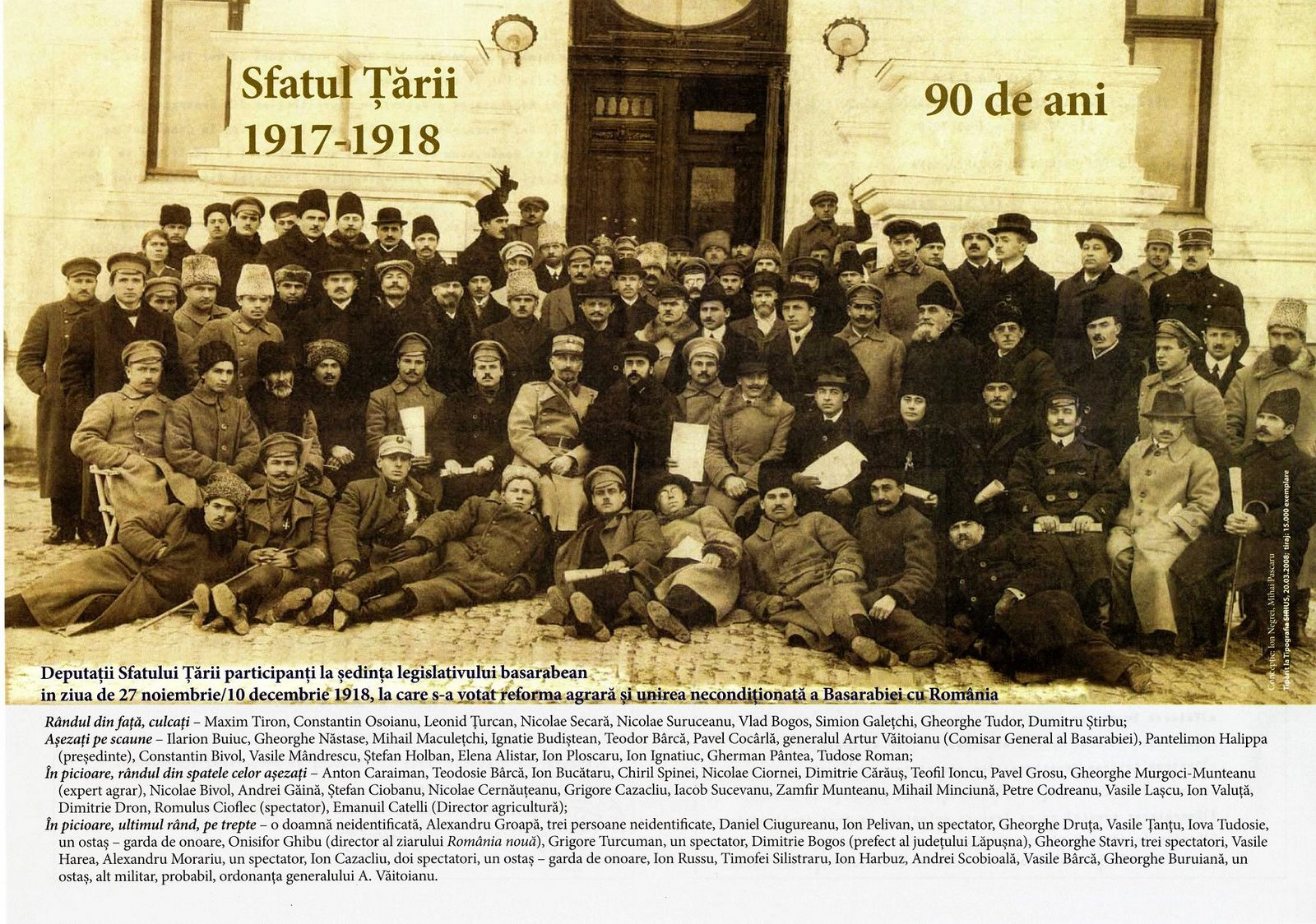
Sfatul Țării Palace, December 10, 1918
