= Bîrlădeni =

- Commune
- Location within Moldova
- Coordinates: 48.2644444444°N 27.4166666667°E
- Country: Moldova
- District: Ocnița

Population (2014)
  - Total: 2,569
- Time zone: UTC+2 (EET)
  - Summer (DST): UTC+3 (EEST)

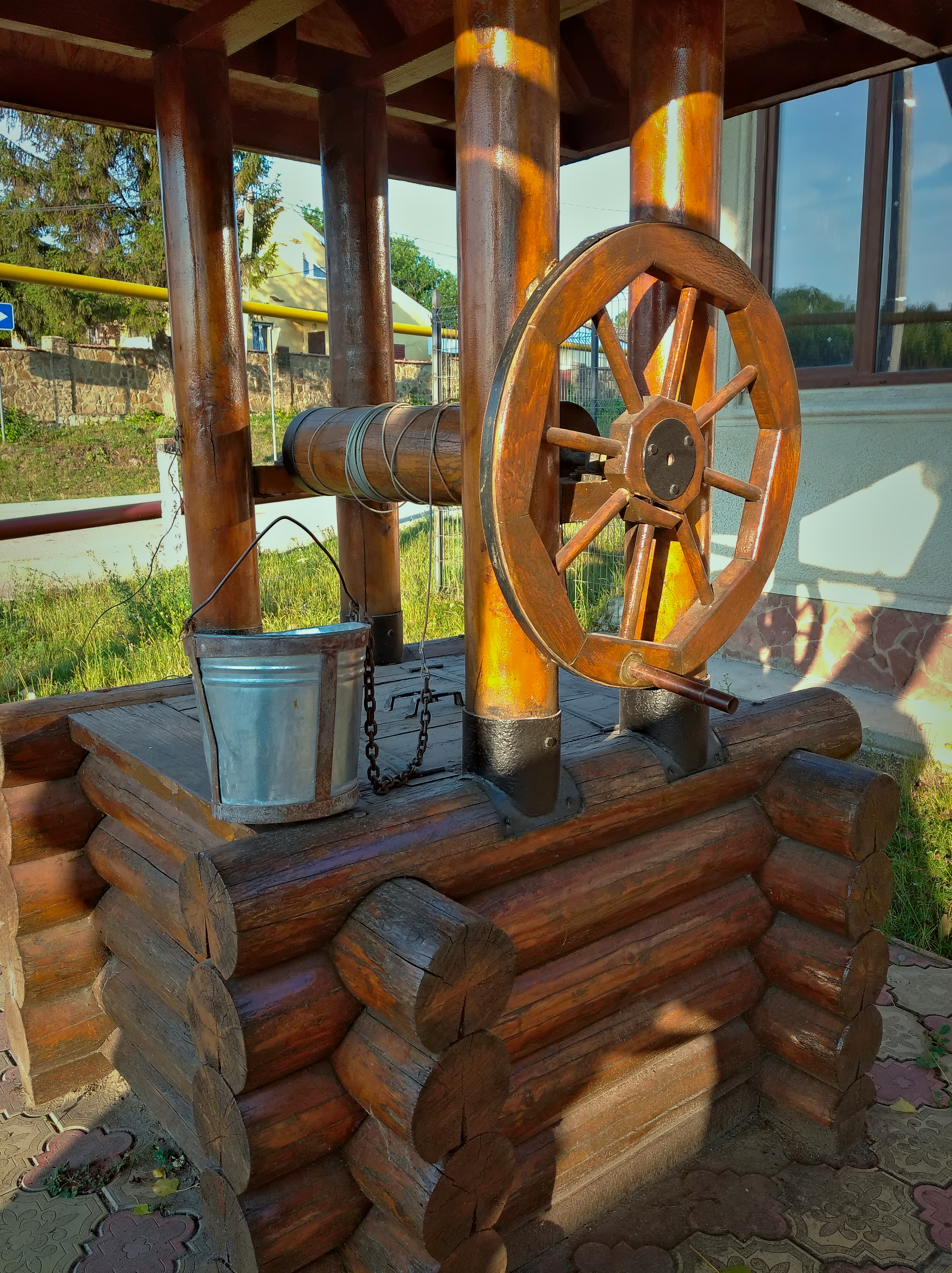
A well from Bîrlădeni.

Bîrlădeni is a commune in Ocnița District, Moldova. It is composed of three villages: Bîrlădeni, Paladea and Rujnița.
