= Pociumbăuți =

- Village
- Location within Moldova
- Coordinates: 48°00′N 27°19′E
- Country: Moldova
- District: Rîșcani District

Government
  - Mayor: Vitalie Țîței (PLDM)

Population (2014 census)
  - Total: 593
- Time zone: UTC+2 (EET)
  - Summer (DST): UTC+3 (EEST)
- Postal code: MD-5632

Pociumbăuți is a village in Rîșcani District, Moldova.

In 2025, the monument to Romanian heroes fallen in the First World War was reconstructed and inaugurated; it had originally been erected in the interwar period and destroyed during the Soviet era. Moldovan sculptor Veaceslav Jiglițchi also contributed to the creation of the monument.
