= Stolniceni, Edineț =

Stolniceni
- Village
- Location within Edineț
- Coordinates: 48°2′8″N 27°20′46″E
- Country: Moldova
- District: Edineț District

Government
  - Mayor: Maria Cojulenco (PN)
- Elevation: 147 m (482 ft)

Population (2014 census)
  - Total: 1,247
- Time zone: UTC+2 (EET)
  - Summer (DST): UTC+3 (EEST)
- Postal code: MD-4640

Stolniceni is a village in Edineț District, Moldova. It is about 100 mi (or 161 km) North-West of Chişinău, the country's capital city.
