= Cupcini =

- Town
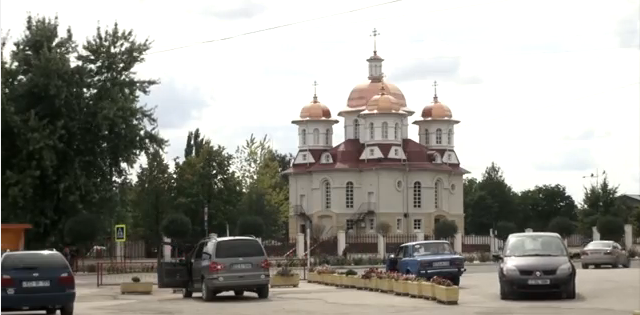

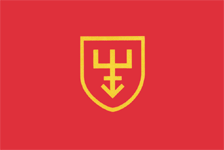
- Flag Coat of arms

- Location in Moldova
- Coordinates: 48°6′39″N 27°23′7″E
- Country: Moldova
- District: Edineț District

Area
  - Total: 4.6 sq mi (12 km^{2})
- Elevation: 472 ft (144 m)

Population (2014)
  - Total: 7,190
  - Density: 1,600/sq mi (600/km^{2})
- Time zone: UTC+2 (EET)
  - Summer (DST): UTC+3 (EEST)
- Postal code: MD-4626
- Area code: + 373 246

Cupcini (Romanian pronunciation: [ˈkupt͡ʃinʲ]) is a town in Edineț District, Moldova. Two villages are administered by the town, Chetroșica Veche and Chiurt.

== History ==
Between 1958 and 1990 it was called Kalininsk.

== Notable people ==
- Alexandru Oleinic
- Nikita Vinitski
- Alexander Kovalchuk

== Gallery ==
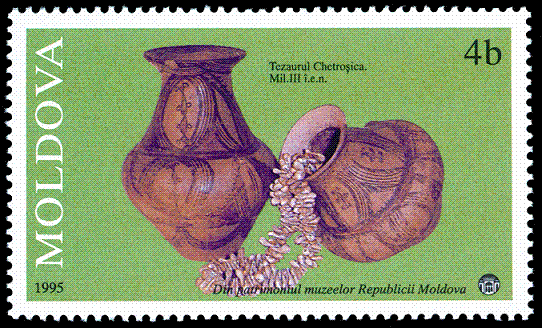
The treasure of Chetroșica (3rd century BC). Discovered in 1994 near the village Chetroșica
