= Fetești, Edineț =

Fetești
- Village
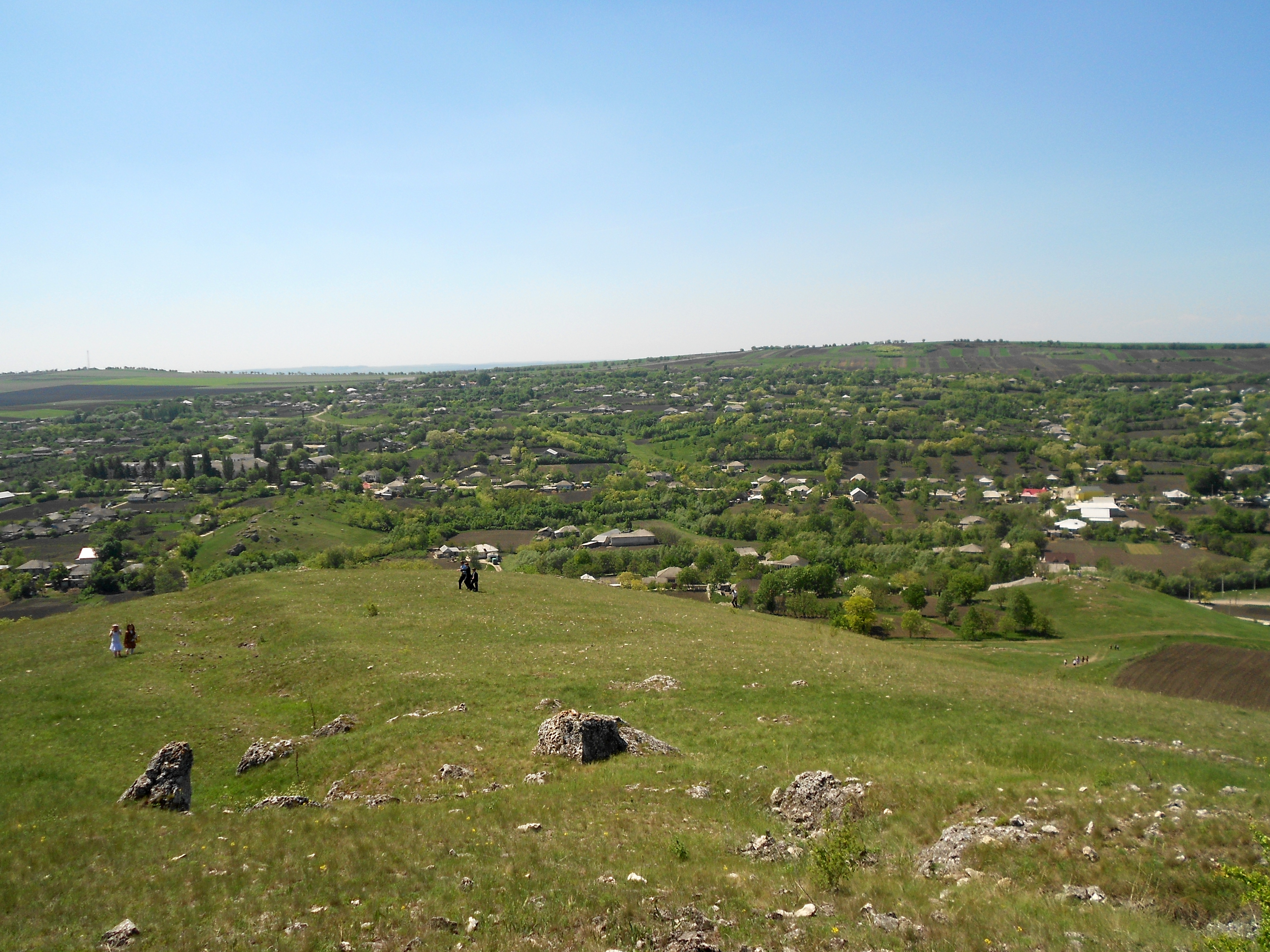

- Location within Edineț
- Coordinates: 48°9′54″N 27°6′2″E
- Country: Moldova
- District: Edineț District

Government
  - Mayor: Ion Munteanu (PDM)

Area
  - Total: 31.11 km^{2} (12.01 sq mi)
- Elevation: 152 m (499 ft)

Population (2014 census)
  - Total: 2,602
- Time zone: UTC+2 (EET)
  - Summer (DST): UTC+3 (EEST)
- Postal code: MD-4627

Fetești is a village in Edineț District, Moldova.
