= Burlănești =

- Commune
- Location within Edineț
- Coordinates: 48°7′37″N 27°7′40″E
- Country: Moldova
- Elevation: 187 m (614 ft)

Population (2014)
  - Total: 1,645
- Time zone: UTC+2 (EET)
  - Summer (DST): UTC+3 (EEST)
- Postal code: MD-4620

Burlănești is a commune in Edineț district, Moldova. It is composed of two villages, Burlănești and Buzdugeni.
