= Costești, Rîșcani =

Costești
- City
- Location in Moldova
- Coordinates: 47°51′30″N 27°15′31″E
- Country: Moldova
- District: Rîșcani District

Population (2014)
  - Total: 3,507
- Time zone: UTC+2 (EET)
  - Summer (DST): UTC+3 (EEST)

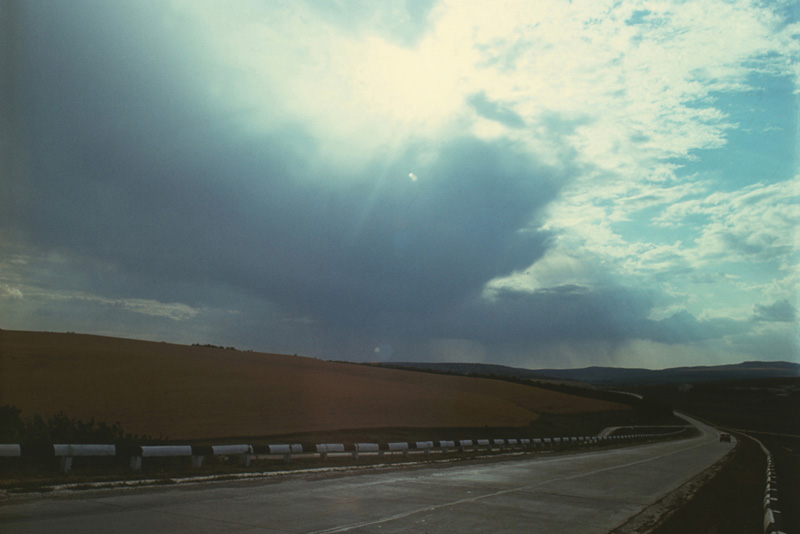
Route to Costesti

Costeşti (Romanian pronunciation: [kosˈteʃtʲ]) is a city in Rîșcani District, in northern Moldova.

== Overview ==
Costești has a population of 4,109 at the 2004 census. It is composed of the city itself, population 2,247, and four villages: Dămășcani, population 361, Duruitoarea, population 379, Păscăuți, population 950, and Proscureni, population 172.

The Stânca-Costeşti Dam is a dam on the Prut River and a checkpoint between Moldova and Romania. The dam is located between Costești and Stânca, in Botoșani County, Romania.
