= Văratic, Rîșcani =

Văratic
- Village
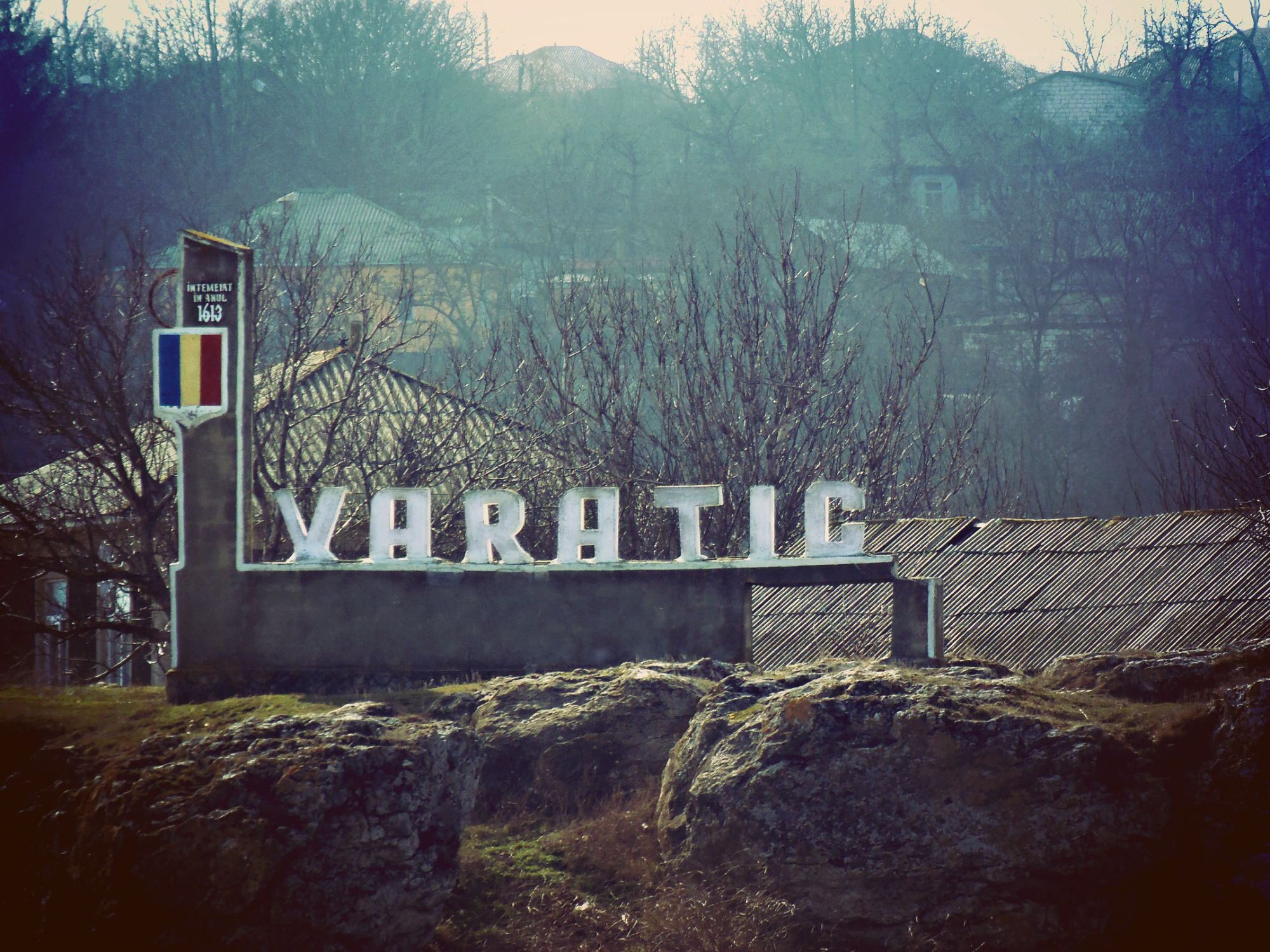
- satul Văratic

- Location in Moldova
- Coordinates: 47°55′N 27°15′E
- Country: Moldova
- District: Rîșcani District

Population (2014 census)
  - Total: 1,910
- Time zone: UTC+2 (EET)
  - Summer (DST): UTC+3 (EEST)

Văratic is a village in Rîșcani District, Moldova.

== Notable people ==
- Anatol Șalaru
