= Rîșcani =

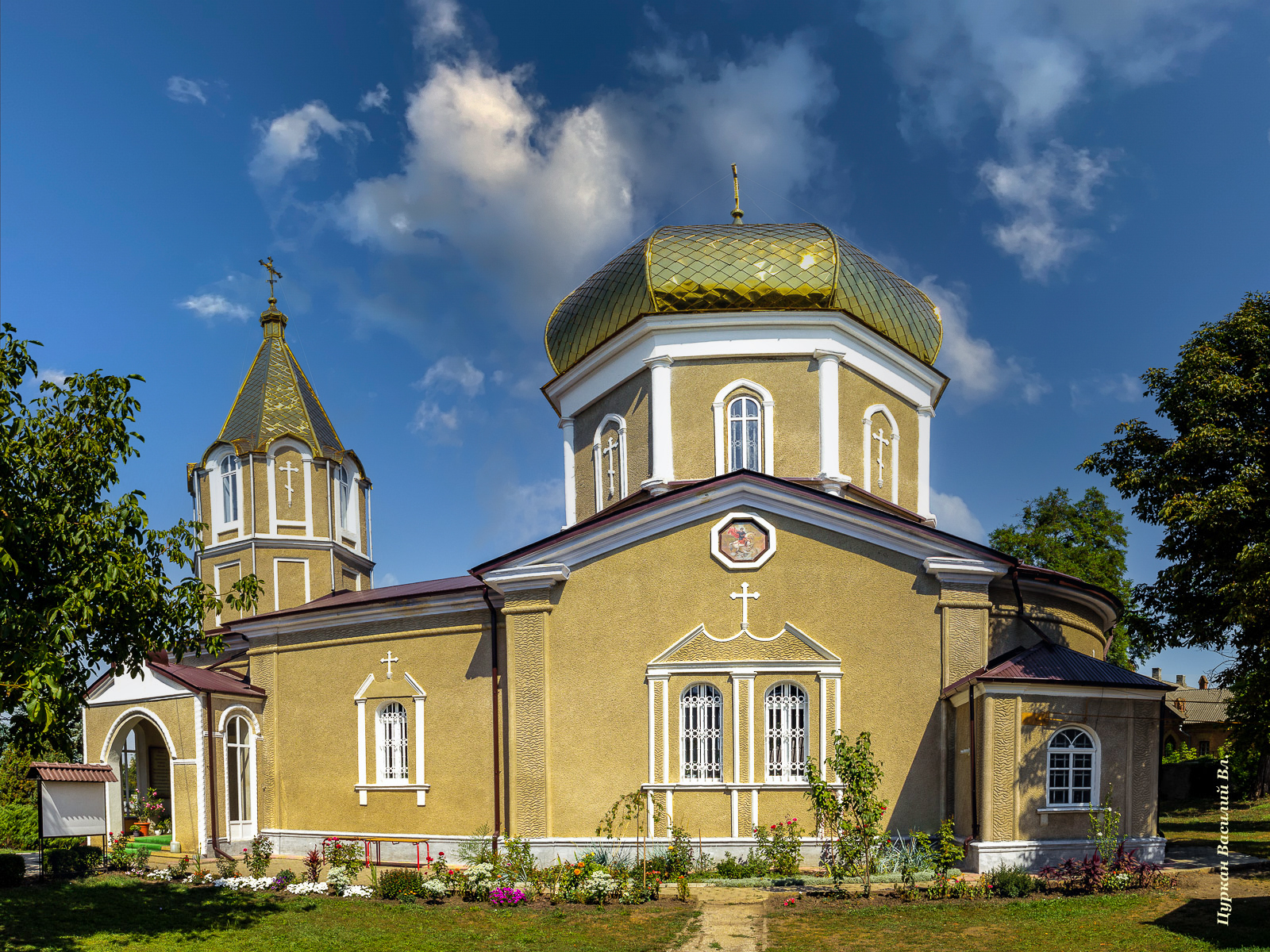
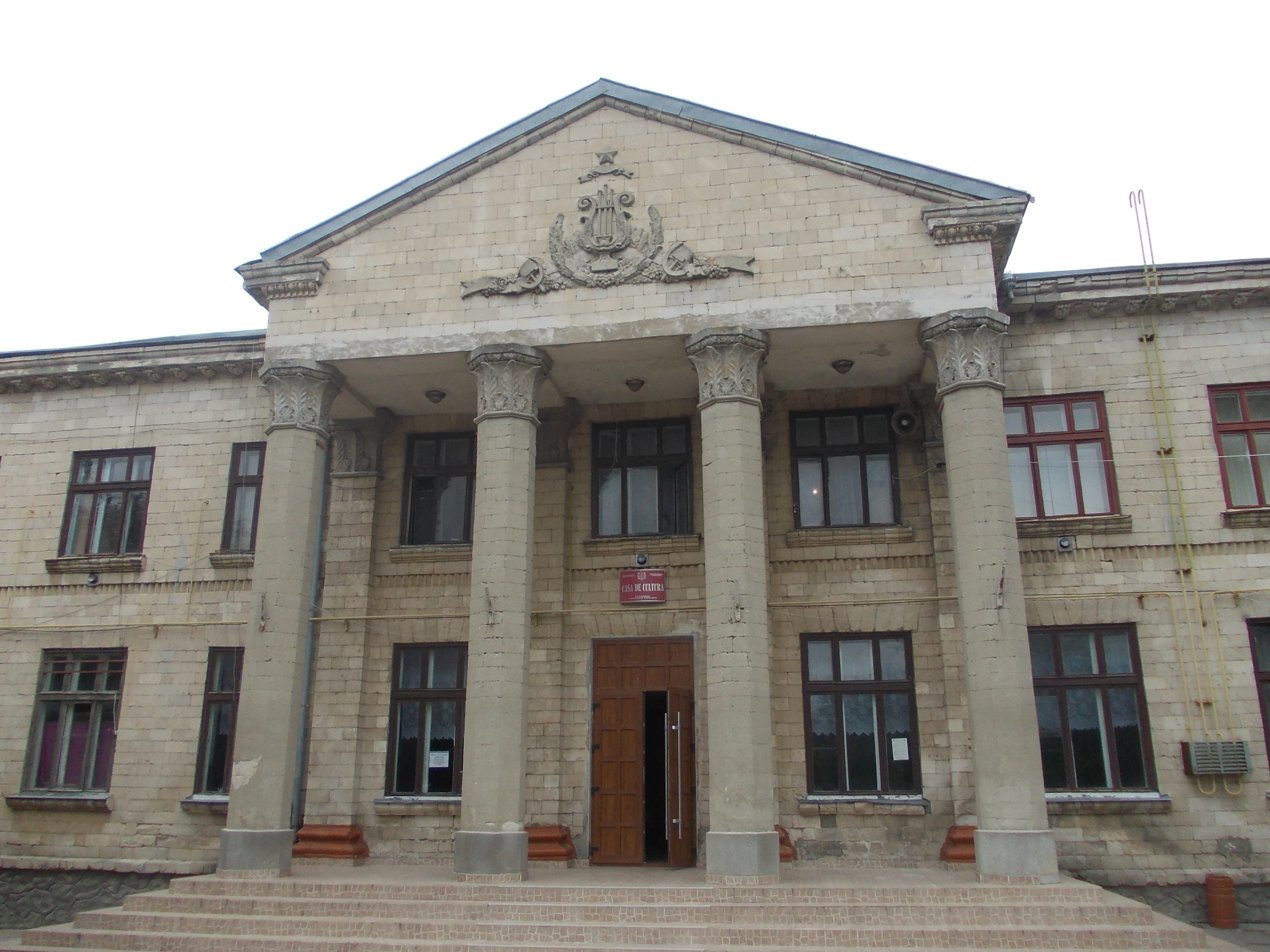
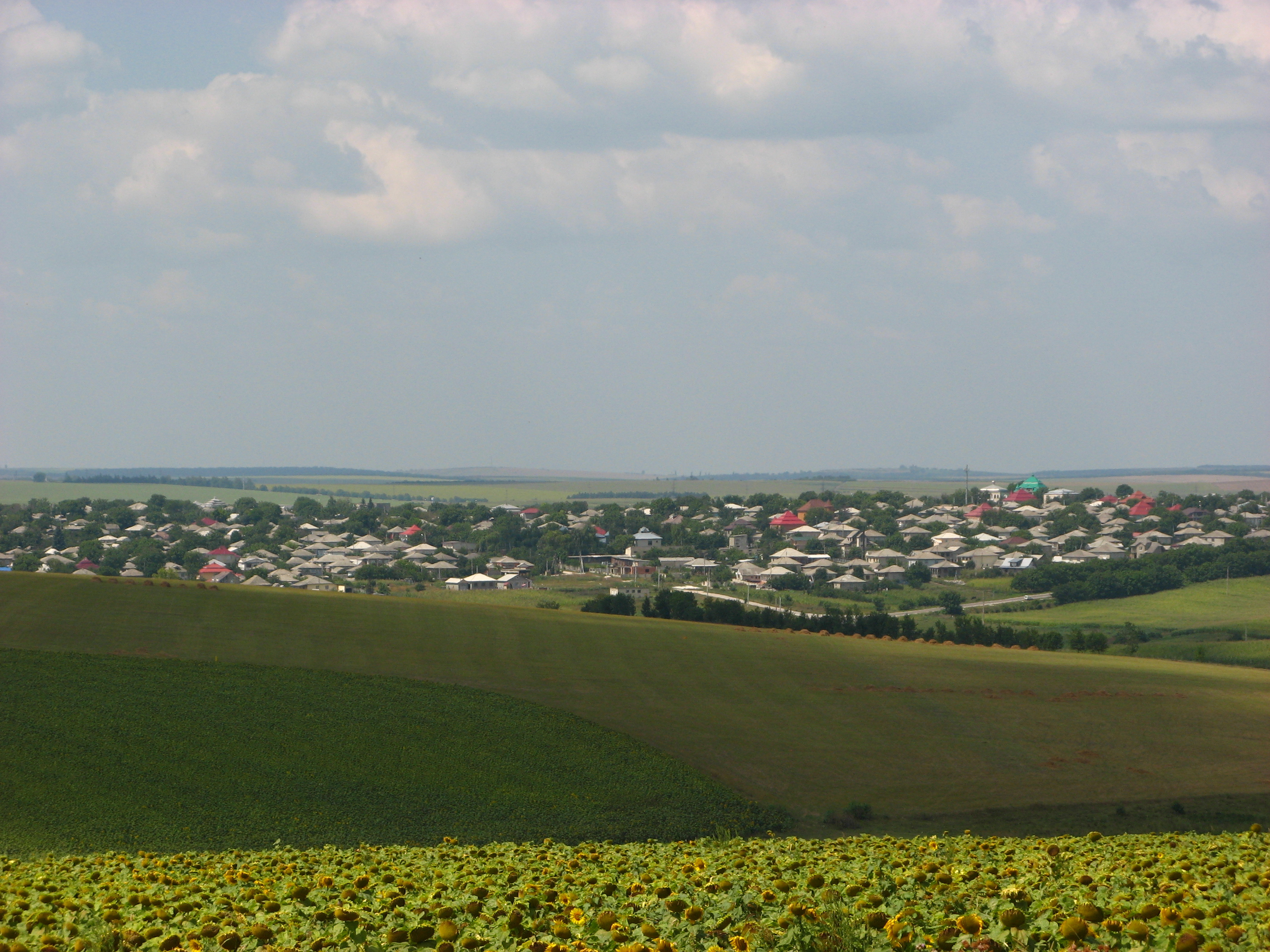
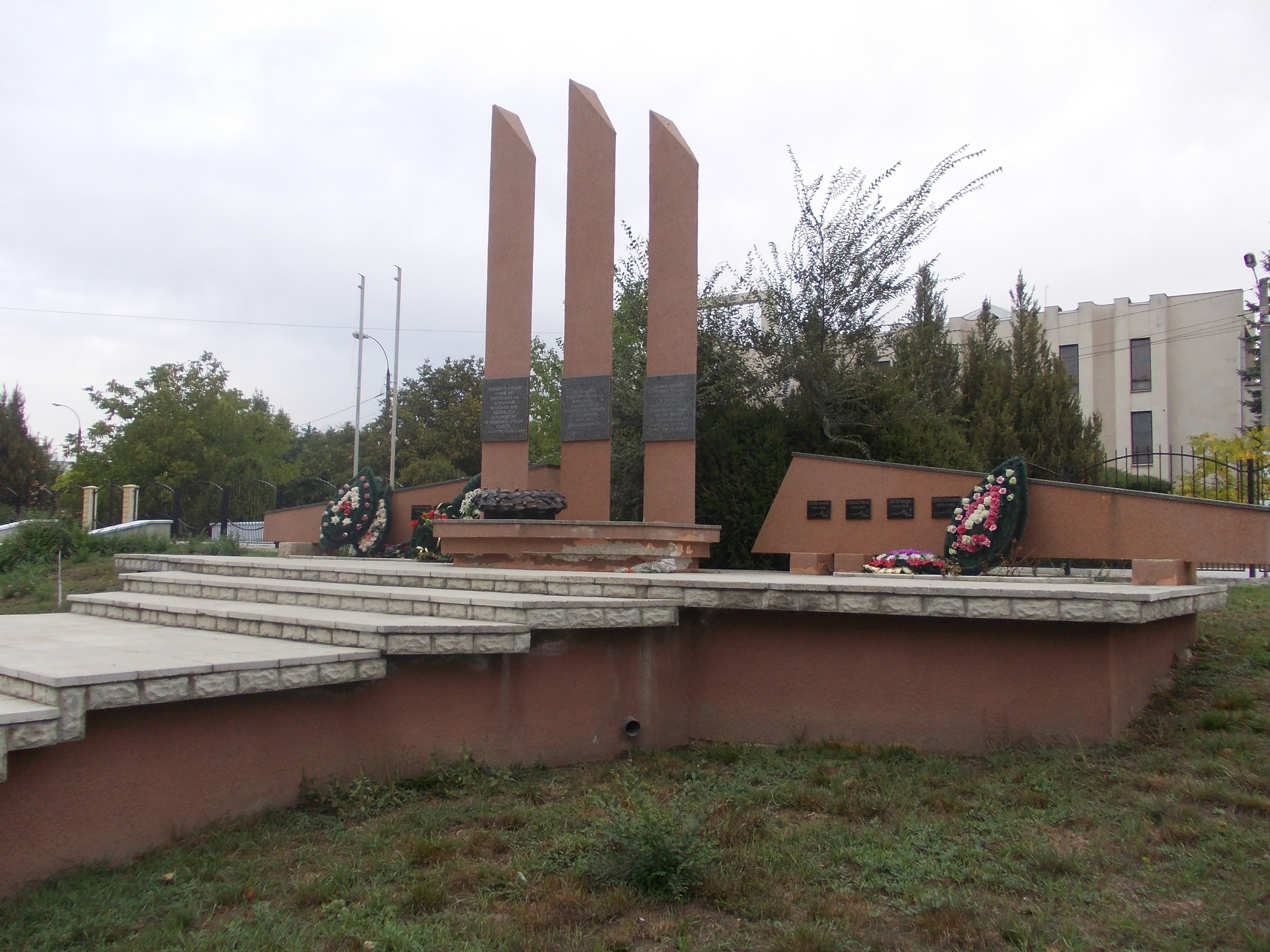
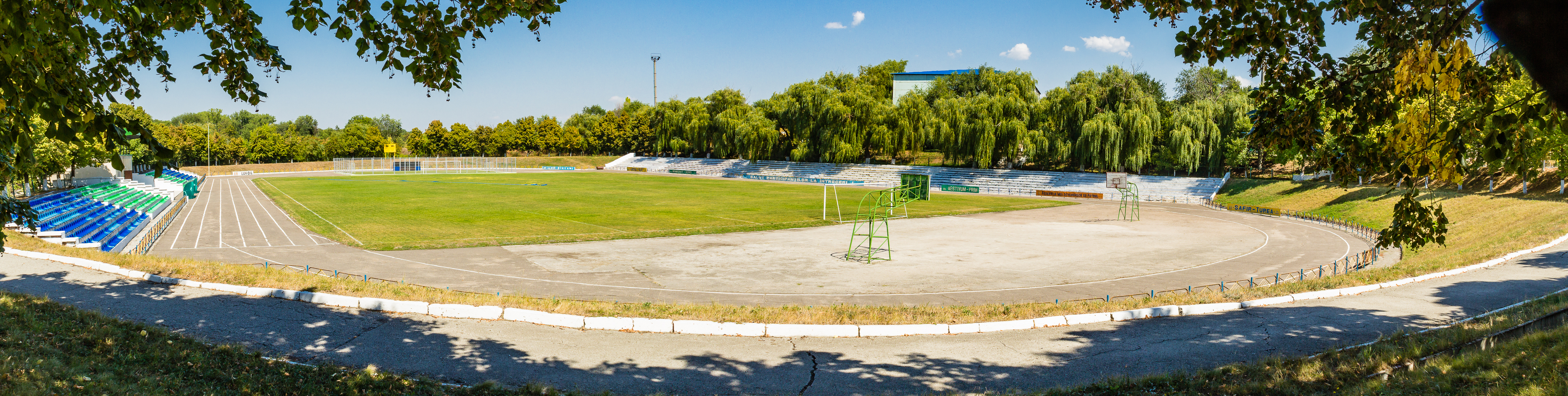

- Location in Moldova
- Coordinates: 47°57′26″N 27°33′14″E
- Country: Moldova
- District: Rîșcani District

Government
  - Mayor: Victor Bogatico (PN)

Area
  - Total: 52.4 km^{2} (20.2 sq mi)

Population (2014)
  - Total: 9,259
  - Density: 177/km^{2} (458/sq mi)
- Time zone: UTC+2 (EET)
  - Summer (DST): UTC+3 (EEST)
- Postal code: 5600
- Area code: 256
- Website: riscani.com

Rîșcani (Romanian pronunciation: [rɨʃˈkanʲ], also spelled Râșcani) is a city in Moldova. It is located in the north-western part of the country, in the old Bessarabia region. It is the largest city and administrative center of Rîșcani District. Spread across an area of 52.4 km^{2} (20.2 sq mi), the town had a population of 9,259 inhabitants in 2014.

== Geography ==
Rîșcani is located in Rîșcani District of Moldova. It is located in the southeastern Europe and in the north-western part of Moldova. Spread across an area of 52.4 km^{2} (20.2 sq mi), it is the largest center of the district. It is one of 27 sub-divisions (two cities and 25 communes) in the district. It is part of the Bessarabia region.

== Demographics ==
Historical population

Year	Pop.	±%
1959	3,771	—
1970	10,869	+188.2%
1979	14,318	+31.7%

Year	Pop.	±%
1989	17,650	+23.3%
2004	12,117	−31.3%
2014	9,259	−23.6%

According to the 2014 census, the population of Rîșcani amounted to 9,259 inhabitants, a decrease compared to the previous census in 2004, when 12,117 inhabitants were registered. Of these, 4,318 were men and 4,941 were women. The population is further projected to reduce over the next few decades. The city had a Human Development Index of 0.699 in 2015. About 1,554 inhabitants were under the age of fourteen, and 1,242 inhabitants were above the age of 65 years. About 91.3% of the population lived in urban areas. The town had an expatriate population of 598 individuals, of whom 22 belonged to the European Union and 486 belonged to the Commonwealth of Independent States. Moldovans formed the major ethnic group (53%), with Ukrainians (31%) forming a large minority. Others include Russians (7.3%), and Romanians (4.6%). The town had a significant Jewish population before the Second World War. Moldovan language was the most spoken language, spoken to by 3,828 (41.8%) inhabitants, with Russian (28.6%) and Ukrainian (18.2%) spoken by significant minorities. About 96.6% of the population followed Eastern Orthodox Christianity, and 3.4% of the population followed other religions.

Ethnic composition of Rîșcani (2014)
1. Moldovans* (53.0%)
2. Romanians (2.98%)
3. Ukrainians (31.0%)
4. Russians (7.27%)
5. Romani (4.63%)
6. Others (1.15%)
:Linguistic composition of Rîșcani (2014)
1. Moldovan* (41.7%)
2. Romanian (10.9%)
3. Russian (24.6%)
4. Ukrainian (18.2%)
5. Romani (4.26%)
6. Other (0.28%)

Footnotes:

* There is an ongoing controversy regarding the ethnic identification of Moldovans and Romanians.

* Moldovan language is one of the two local names for the Romanian language in Moldova. In 2013, the Constitutional Court of Moldova interpreted that Article 13 of the constitution is superseded by the Declaration of Independence, thus giving official status to the name Romanian.
