= Horodiște, Rîșcani =

Horodiște
- Village
- Location within Moldova
- Coordinates: 47.9538888889°N 27.2638888889°E
- Country: Moldova
- District: Rîșcani District

Government
  - Mayor: Agulceana Scutelnic (PL)

Population (2014 census)
  - Total: 776
- Time zone: UTC+2 (EET)
  - Summer (DST): UTC+3 (EEST)

Horodiște is a village in Rîșcani District, Moldova.
