= Edineț District =

Coordinates: 48°10′N 27°15′E

Edineț District Raionul Edineț
- District
- Flag Coat of arms

- Country: Republic of Moldova
- Administrative center (Oraș-reşedință): Edineț
- Established: 2002

Government
  - District President: Nicolai Melnic (PSRM)

Area
  - Total: 933 km^{2} (360 sq mi)
  - Water: 27.3 km^{2} (10.5 sq mi) 2.93%
- Elevation: 275 m (902 ft)

Population (2024)
  - Total: 50,429
  - Density: 54.1/km^{2} (140/sq mi)
- Time zone: UTC+2 (EET)
  - Summer (DST): UTC+3 (EEST)
- Area code: +373 46
- Car plates: ED
- Website: Official website

Edineț ([ediˈnets]) is a district (Romanian: raion) in the northwestern part of Moldova, with its administrative center in the city of Edineț. The district’s other urban locality is Cupcini.

== History ==
The earliest record of settlements in what is now Edineț District dates to July 15, 1431, during the reign of Alexander the Good, when the ruler granted vornic Ivan Cupcici three deserted plots of land to establish new villages. On July 15, 1439, the settlement of Veadineț was founded. About a century and a half later, on August 18, 1609, during the reign of Constantin Movilă, a charter (gramota) issued to a certain Cozma Plop recorded the village’s toponymic transformation from Viadineți to Iadineți. The name Edineț was first recorded in 1663 and has remained in use ever since.

A census conducted between 1772 and 1774 recorded only 15 households in what is today the town of Edineț, which was then a village, and the first church there was confirmed in 1793. Following the Treaty of Bucharest of 1812, Bessarabia was occupied by the Russian Empire, and the region remained under Russian administration until 1918. In 1866, the district experienced a major plague epidemic.

With the Union of Bessarabia with Romania in 1918, the area became part of Romania. In 1940, under the Molotov–Ribbentrop Pact, Bessarabia and the district were occupied by the USSR. Between 1941 and 1944, the region was temporarily under Romanian administration during World War II. After 1944, Edineț District returned to Soviet control as part of the Moldavian SSR. Following the independence of Moldova in 1991, the district’s territory was briefly expanded to form the Edineț County between 1998 and 2003, after which it reverted to its previous boundaries.

== Geography ==
Edineț District is bordered by Briceni District to the north, Ocnița District to the northeast, Dondușeni District to the east, Rîșcani District to the south, and Romania to the west across the Prut river. The most important rivers crossing the district are Ciuhur (90 km) and Racovăț (68 km) with its main tributary Draghiște (67 km). All rivers in the district flow into the Prut.

The majority of the district lies on the Moldavian Plateau, which is relatively flat with little fragmentation. The highest point in the district is located near the village Clișcăuți in the northeast, reaching 275 meters above sea level.

In the central-western part of the district, a strip of coral is exposed, locally called toltre. These formations are composed of organogenic limestone, formed on the bottom of the former Sarmatian Sea, and date back 15–20 million years. Today, they rise from the surface as massive reefs reaching a maximum height of 80–100 meters. Many caves in these rocks served as shelters for Stone Age humans.

=== Fauna ===
The fauna of the district is characteristic of both Eastern and Central Europe. It includes species such as the fox, deer, boar, raccoon dog, ferret, and rabbit. More rarely, the marten, wolf, and wildcat can be found.

Among bird species, common ones include the woodpecker, tit, cuckoo, starling, and sparrow, while the quail, partridge, and marsh harrier are encountered less frequently.

=== Flora ===
Forests cover about 8.5% of the district’s territory and are characterized by species such as the common oak, chestnut, maple, ash, and wild cherry. The herbaceous flora includes plants such as fescue, sedge, ramsons, and plantain.

=== Resources ===
The district has no major natural resources, apart from deposits of Silurian shale and sandstone belonging to the Silurian geological formation. Compact shale containing traces of amber is also found in the area, along with deposits of limestone and silica.

=== Climate ===
As part of northern Moldova, the district has a temperate continental climate, with an average annual temperature of 9 °C (48 °F). The average temperature in July is 20.5 °C (68.9 °F), while in January it is around −5 °C (23 °F). Annual precipitation averages between 550 mm and 750 mm, though in some years it can reach up to 850 mm, causing flooding, while in drier years it may fall to around 300 mm, leading to droughts. The average wind speed in the district ranges from 3 to 5 m/s.

=== Protected areas ===
The district contains several protected natural areas, including:

- Brînzeni Reefs and Caves
- Buzdugeni Gorge
- Burlănești Gorge
- Fetești Landscape Reserve
- La Castel Landscape Reserve
- Trinca Gorge
- Zăbriceni Reserve

== Administrative subdivisions ==
- Localities: 49
  - Cities: Cupcini, Edineț
  - Communes: 30
    - Villages: 17

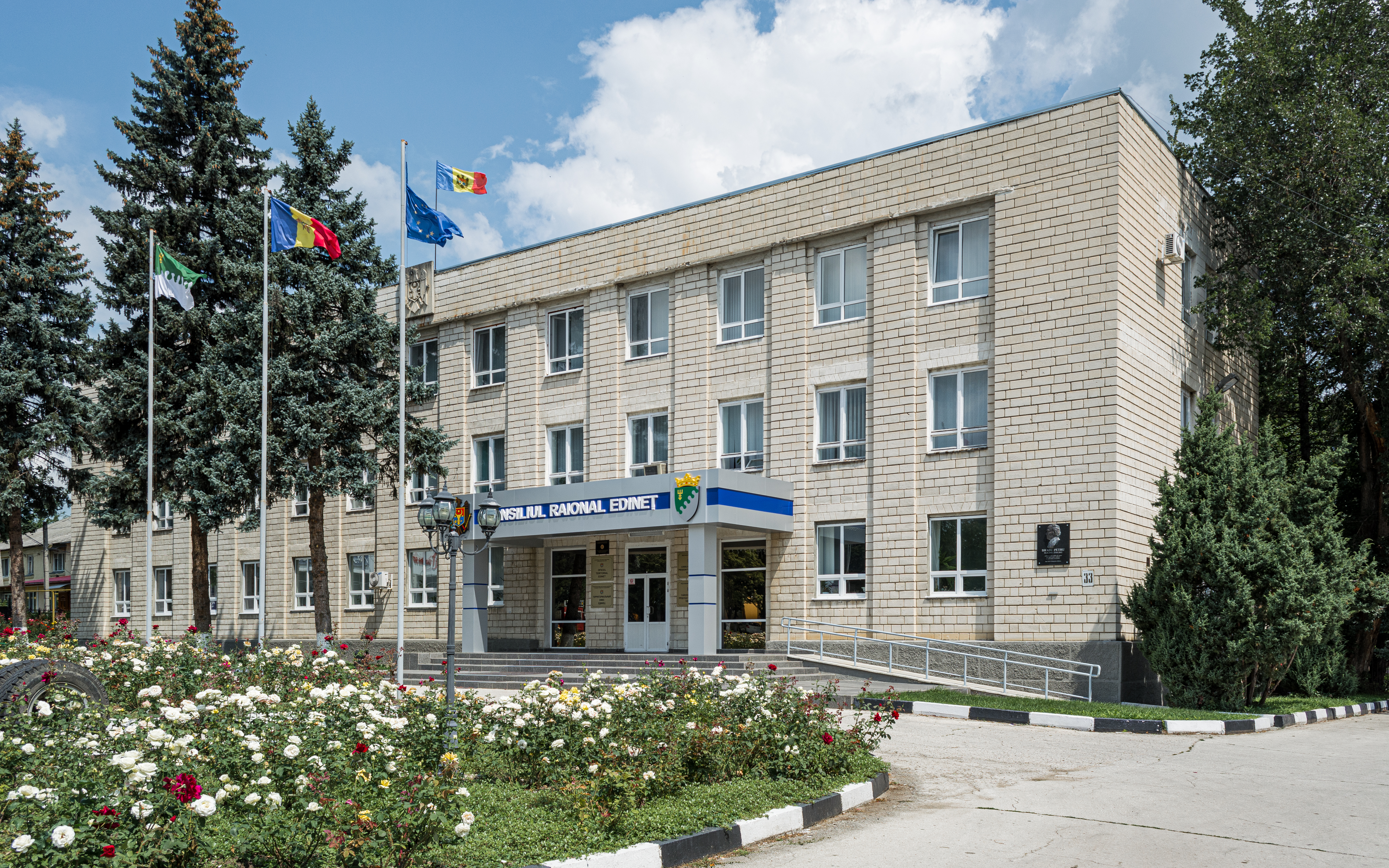
Seat of the District Council

== Demographics ==
According to the 2024 census, 50,429 inhabitants lived in Edineț District, a decrease compared to the previous census in 2014, when 71,849 inhabitants were registered.

Ethnic composition of Edineț District (2024)
1. Moldovans (Note: There is an ongoing controversy regarding the ethnic identification of Moldovans and Romanians.) (77.4%)
2. Romanians (3.30%)
3. Ukrainians (13.3%)
4. Russians (4.10%)
5. Romani (1.30%)
6. Others (0.50%)
Linguistic composition of Edineț District (2024)
1. Moldovan (Note: In March 2023, the Parliament of Moldova passed a law updating all legislative texts and the constitution to refer to the national language as Romanian, effectively rendering the term "Moldovan" obsolete.) (58.9%)
2. Romanian (15.6%)
3. Russian (16.2%)
4. Ukrainian (7.80%)
5. Romani (1.20%)
6. Other (0.20%)

Historical population
Year	Pop.	±%
2004	81,390	—
2014	71,849	−11.7%
2024	50,429	−29.8%

=== Religion ===
- Christian Orthodox - 86.7%
- Jehovah's Witnesses - 4.6%
- Pentecostals - 3.0%
- Seventh-day Adventists - 1.2%
- Other - 2.0%
- Irreligious - 1.6%
- Not stated - 0.9%

== Economy ==
Edineț district in Moldova's National Development Complex, is presented as an agrarian-industrial district. Agricultural area is 74 556 ha of the district. Economy, agriculture, industry on the district (as at 01/10/06) 20,946 active traders (in the same period of 2005–2012). Industrial output in the previous year's average prices, manufactured by enterprises of all types of property in the territory in 2005, was 377,41 mill. lei or 135 percent from 2004. The volume index of industrial production in current prices compared with the previous year, accounted for 131.1%. If in 2004 there was industrial production value of 236,89 mill. lei in 2005 production volume reached EUR 310,623 mill. lei, or 73 million lei more than 734,000. The total volume of industrial production, manufacturing and return them 99%. Main enterprises are Cupcini-Cristal, InLac, Tipografia, Natur-Bravo, Astra, Apromaș and others.

=== Agriculture ===
Agriculture is the main branch in the district economy. In 2005 the overall volume of agricultural production in all categories of households in comparable prices, was 378.3 mill. lei, exceeding the previous year by 28.3 million or 8%, and compared to 2000 production agriculture increased by 18.5%. In 2005 agricultural production (current prices) amounted to 415.1 mill. lei, which showed an increase of 8.6% over the previous year and compared to 2000 – by 24.5%. The agricultural production structure has the dominant position in crop production – 75.1% (which is more by 14% as in 2000), in 2005 obtained a harvest of cereals and legumes with a quantity of 108235 tons, achieving a yoy increase of 18.4 thousand tons, or 20.4% more. Average yield per hectare was winter wheat – 35 quintals, barley – 31 quintals, peas – 22 quintals, corn – 30 quintals. A significant revival attesting to increase the volume of production which increased compared to previous year 5850 tons or more, and average productivity per hectare was 19 to 15 quintals in 2004. Similarly, increased by 8.7% potato and vegetables by 11.3%.

== Transportation ==
In district are open 53 regular passenger routes, of which 9 – Chișinău, 15 – interdistrict, 3 – International (Moscow, St. Petersburg, Botoșani), 26 – rural (includes all localities in the district). Maintenance have been met roads the local district funded. Of the total planned maintenance and repair of 493,3 thousands lei roads this chapter have been assessed 493,3 thousands, of which 160,7 thousands lei were used to maintain winter 2005.

== Politics ==
Edineț District lies in Moldova’s “Red North,” a region long known for its consistent support of the PCRM, PSRM and other pro-Russian forces. In recent years, however, the district’s political landscape has become somewhat more balanced.

Summary of the 28 September 2025 parliamentary election in Edineț District
Parties and coalitions	Votes	%	+/−
Patriotic Electoral Bloc	11,090	42.51	-4.60
Party of Action and Solidarity	7,176	27.51	-1.69
Alternative	2,319	8.89	new
Democracy at Home Party	1,639	6.28	+4.97
Our Party	1,416	5.43	+0.23
Other	2,448	9.38	-7.79
Total (turnout 44.36%)	26,840	100.00	

== Educations ==
The district operates 38 kindergartens and 44 undergraduate institutions, of which 8 schools, 8 middle schools, 28 secondary schools. In pre-school children to educate 3008, which is 61.2%, in 4815 the number of preschool children in the district. Also, preparatory working group 38 with a contingent of 835 children. In schools in the district are studying 10,777 students are all enrolled. The system of secondary education teachers working in 1040, including 119 retirees, young professionals were hired in July. Young professionals have benefited from facilities provided by law. Teaching is provided to cover all disciplines of education in the Plan of Ministry of Education, Youth and Sports. Continue implementation of the presidential program "SALT".

== Culture ==
The successes enjoyed by district librarians, organizing poetry recitals, discussions of books, contests. Each library is organized book exhibitions. Annual district participate in the Republican "the sources of wisdom." In the three schools of arts education teaches children and 342 teachers are employed 37. Many graduates continue their studies at colleges and degree in music. Some students from the School of Fine Arts in Edineț, participating in international exhibitions with medals and awards are relaxed. Conditions are satisfactory school activity. The museum enjoys great popularity in his native land with sections Edineț history, folk art, nature. Currently the museum has 24,500 artifacts. Regular visitors are children in kindergartens, schools district students and even visitors from the republic and other countries.

== Health ==
The district operates 14 health center, 21 offices of family doctors, 8 medical centers, a hospital district. During 2005, 10,976 people received treatment, including 10 209 patients were hospitalized. Drugs were issued in the amount of 1,923,500 lei. Number of visits by patients to family doctors centers is 253,662, of which – 227,994 visits to district clinic. Of the total population of 84,720 people have insurance policies 59,456 people required medical assistance. Improving socio-economic situation in recent years has had a positive influence on health status and medical basic demographic indicators. Thus, in 2010 888 children were born. But unfortunately the negative natural increase: births is 10.7% (1,000 people) and 16.2% mortality.

== Personalities ==
- Ghenadie Ciobanu – Composer, politician, Minister of Culture of the Republic of Moldova (1997–2001)
- Grigore Eremei – Politician, last First Secretary of the Communist Party of Moldova before the party was banned in 1991
- Anatoliy Kinakh – Politician, Prime Minister of Ukraine (2001–2002)
- Nicolae Lupan – Journalist and anti-Soviet activist; broadcast for Radio Free Europe (1974–1987), advocating the liberation of Romanian territories
- Alexandru Oleinic – Politician, Minister of Information Technology and Communications of the Republic of Moldova (2009 – 2011)
- Alexandru Spiridon – Footballer and coach, former player for the Moldova national team, and UEFA Cup winner as assistant coach with FC Shakhtar Donetsk
- Vasile Stroescu – Bessarabian and Romanian politician, landowner, philanthropist, and honorary member of the Romanian Academy
- Victor Teleucă – Poet, essayist, translator, and publicist
- Ivan Vakarchuk – Physicist and academic, Rector of University of Lviv (1990–2007, 2010–2013), and Minister of Education and Science of Ukraine (2007–2010)
- Samuel Wainer – Brazilian journalist and author of Jewish origin

== See also ==
- Edineț County
