= Stânca–Costești Dam =

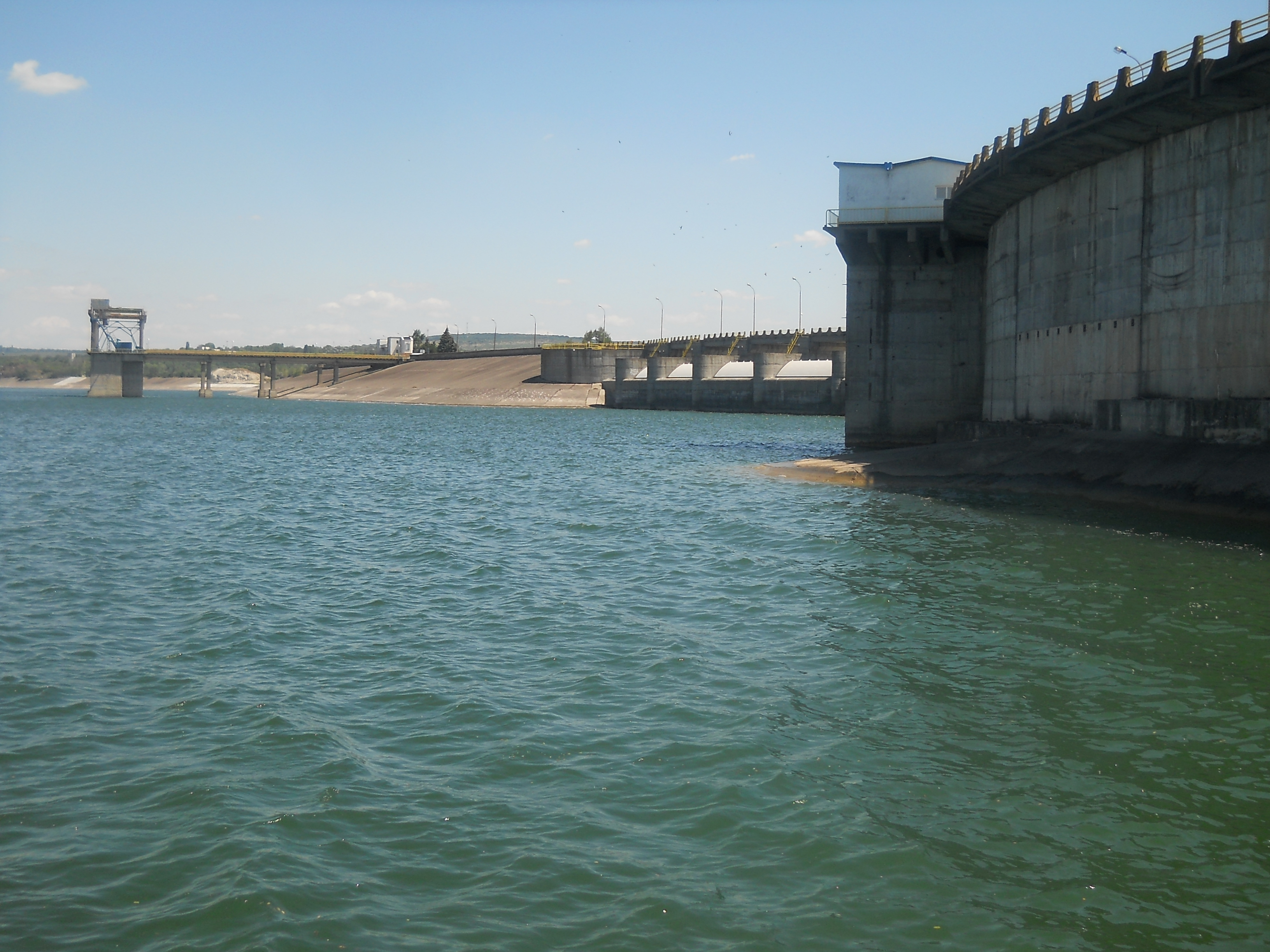

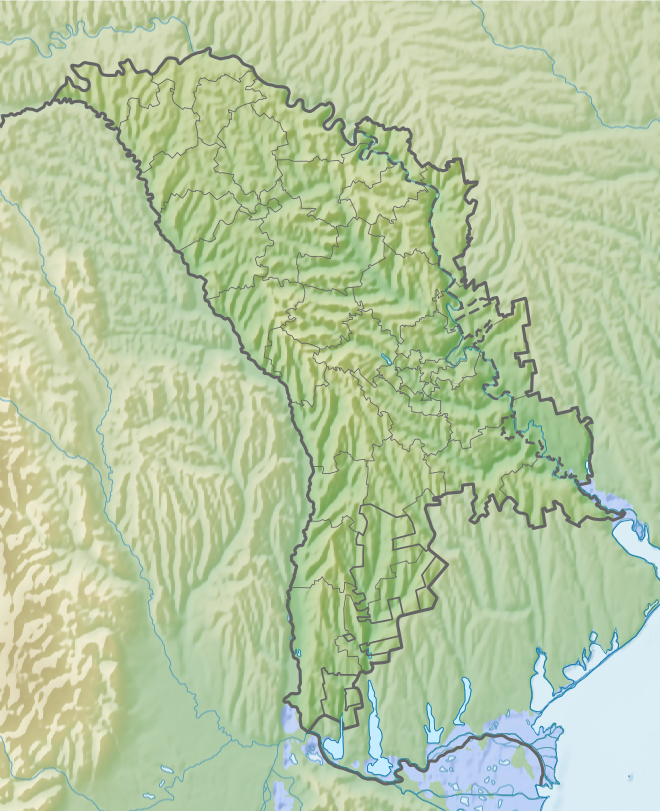
- Location within Moldova
- Official name: Barajul Stânca–Costești
- Location: Costești (Moldova) / Stânca (Romania)
- Coordinates: 47°51′30″N 27°15′31″E
- Construction began: 1974
- Opening date: 5 November 1978
- Owner: C.N. Apele Române S.A.

Dam and spillways
- Impounds: Prut
- Height: 43 m (141 ft)
- Length: 300 m (980 ft)

Reservoir
- Creates: Stânca–Costești Lake
- Total capacity: 1.29 km^{3} (1,050,000 acre⋅ft)
- Catchment area: 12,000 km^{2} (4,600 sq mi)
- Surface area: 77 km^{2} (30 sq mi)

Power Station
- Turbines: 2 × 16 MW
- Installed capacity: Moldova: 16 MW; Romania: 16 MW

The Stânca–Costești Dam (Romanian: Barajul Stânca–Costești) is a dam on the Prut River and a checkpoint between Moldova and Romania. The dam is located between Costești (Moldova) and Stânca (Romania).

== History ==
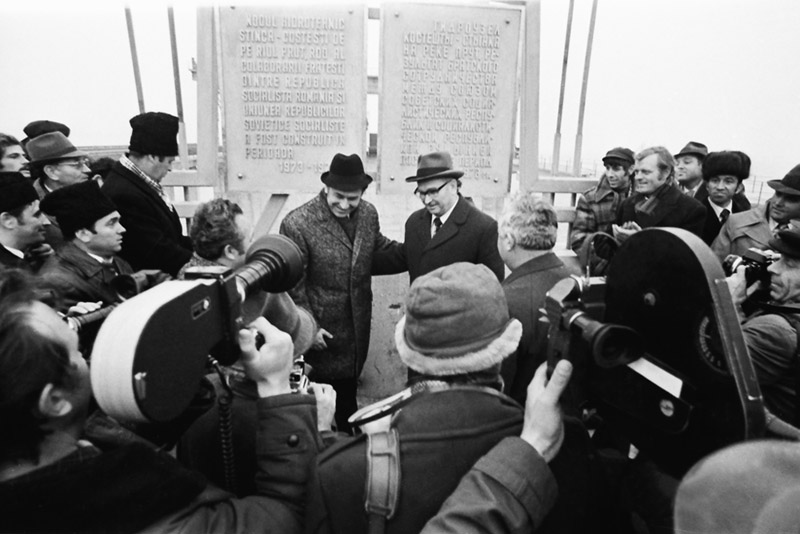
Ion Iliescu and Ivan Bodiul at the opening of the Stânca–Costești Hydroelectrical Plant in 1978

The basic Romanian-Soviet agreement on its construction was ratified in 1972. Built between 1974 and 1978, the Stânca Costești Lake was a USSR-Romanian project. The lake is the reservoir for a hydro power station. The main goal of building this power station was to protect villages down the Prut river from annual floods. The 1970 floods in Romania were the worst in modern Romanian history in loss of life.

On 5 November 1978 the Stânca–Costești Hydroelectrical Plant on the Prut was inaugurated. Romania was represented by Ion Iliescu, the then-Minister of Electric Power Trandafir Cocîrlă, and Chairman Florin Iorgulescu of the Romanian National Council for Water Conservation, while Ivan Bodiul, Minister of Power and Electrification Peter Stepanovich Neporozhny, and Deputy Minister of Land Reclamation and Water Conservation Polat Zade represented the USSR.
