= Andi Cristea =

Romanian politician (born 1982)

Andi Cristea MEP
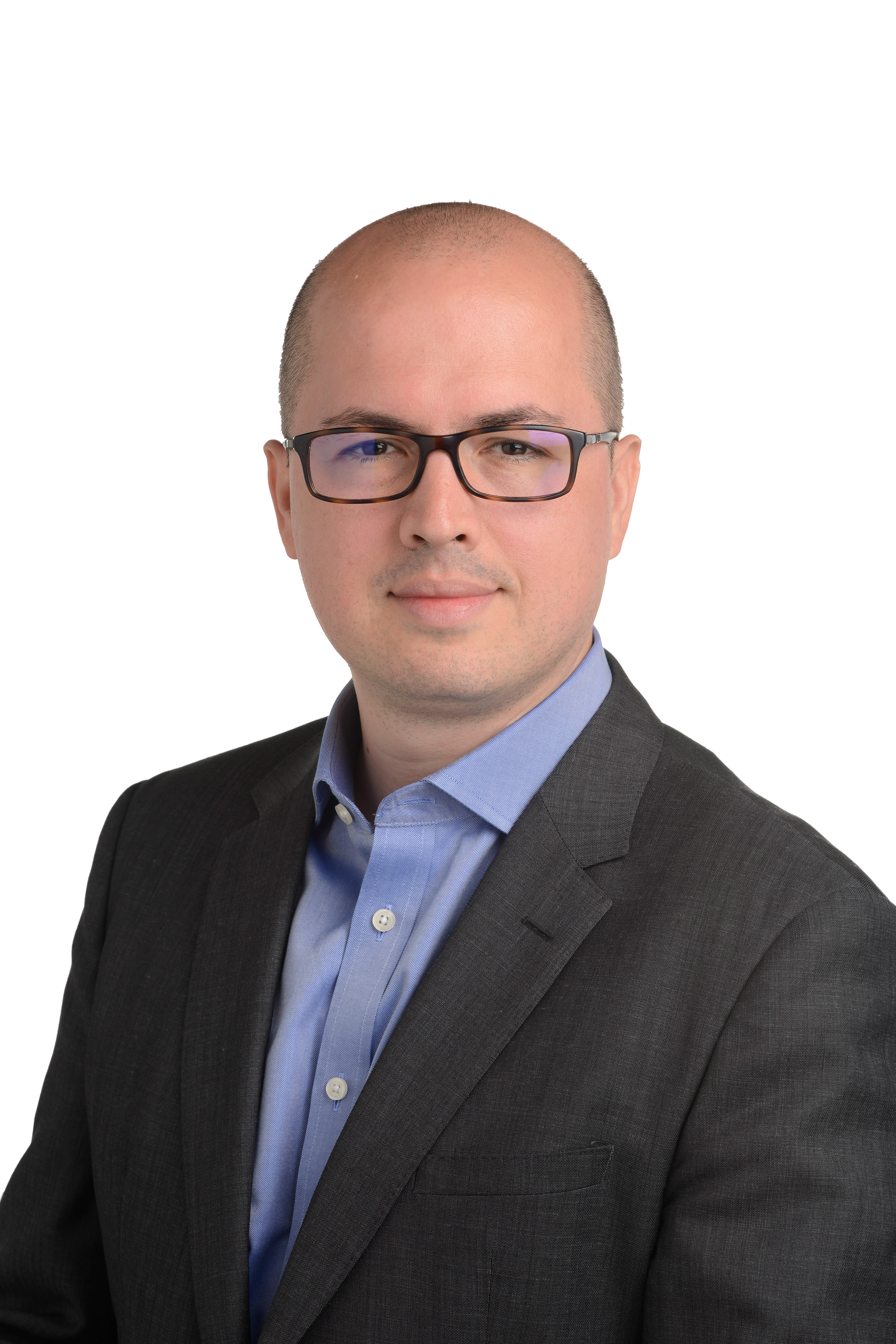
- Cristea in 2020

Member of the European Parliament
- Incumbent
- Assumed office 2 December 2024
- Preceded by: Roxana Mînzatu
- Constituency: Romania
- In office 1 July 2014 – 1 July 2019
- Constituency: Romania

Member of the Chamber of Deputies
- In office 21 December 2020 – 1 December 2024
- Constituency: Buzău

Personal details
- Born: 5 January 1982 (age 44)
- Party: Social Democratic Party
- Other political affiliations: Party of European Socialists

Andi-Lucian Cristea (born 5 January 1982) is a Romanian politician of the Social Democratic Party. Since 2020, he has been a member of the Chamber of Deputies. He was the executive director of the Social Democratic Youth from 2010 to 2013, and the director general of the Ministry of Foreign Affairs from 2012 to 2014.

He previously served as a member of the European Parliament from 2014 to 2019. He was not directly elected in 2024, but replaced Roxana Mînzatu after her nomination as a European Commissioner in December 2024.

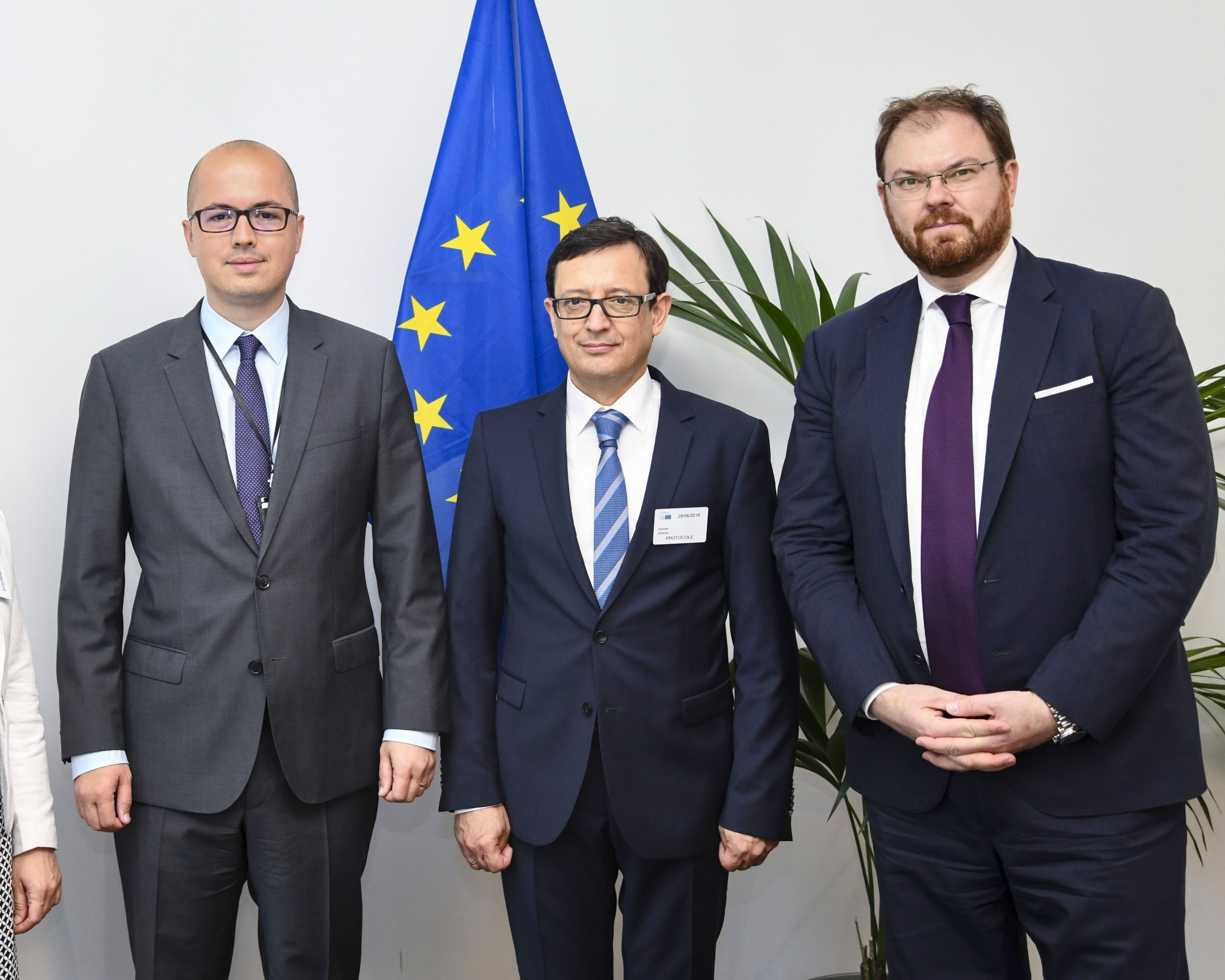
Cristea with finance minister Octavian Armașu (centre) and NBM governor Sergiu Cioclea in Brussels on 28 June 2018
