= Agriculture in Moldova =

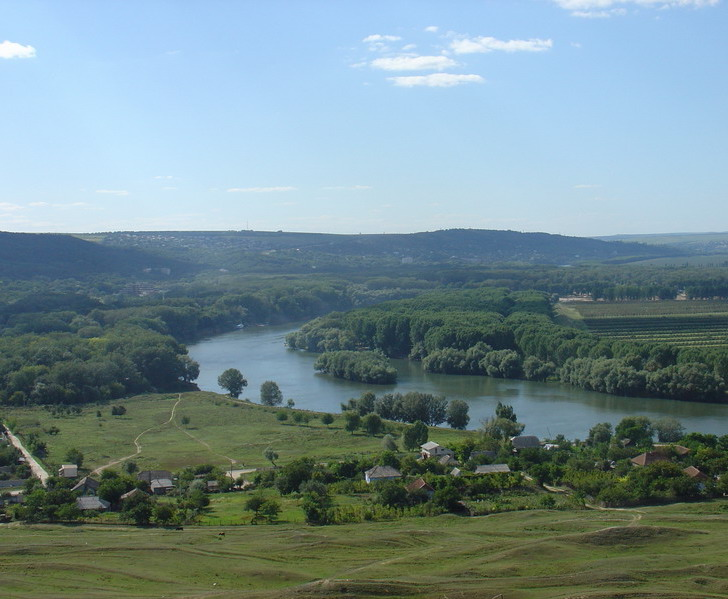
Agricultural Land in Dniester, Moldova

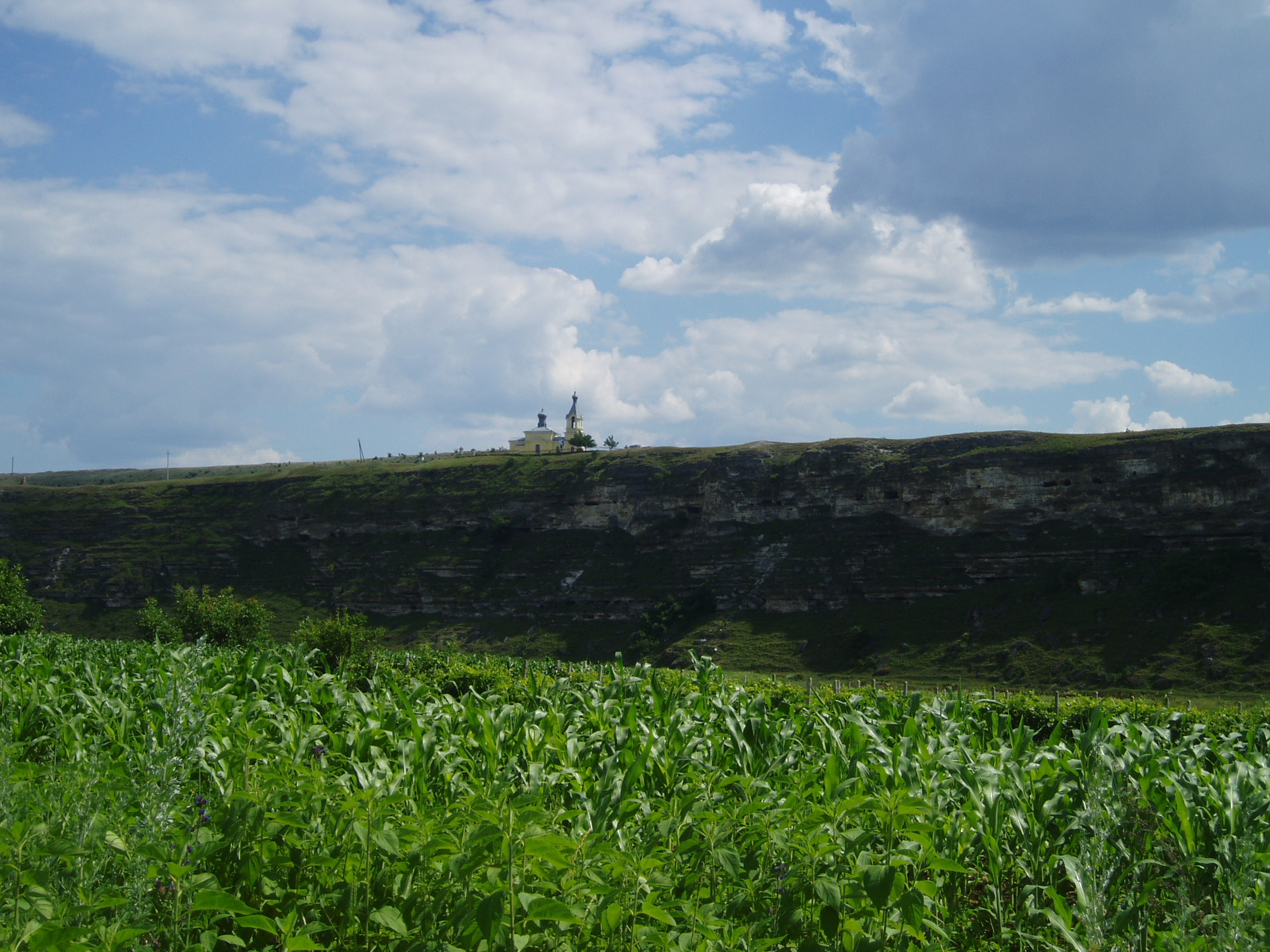
Corn field at Orheiul Vechi, Moldova

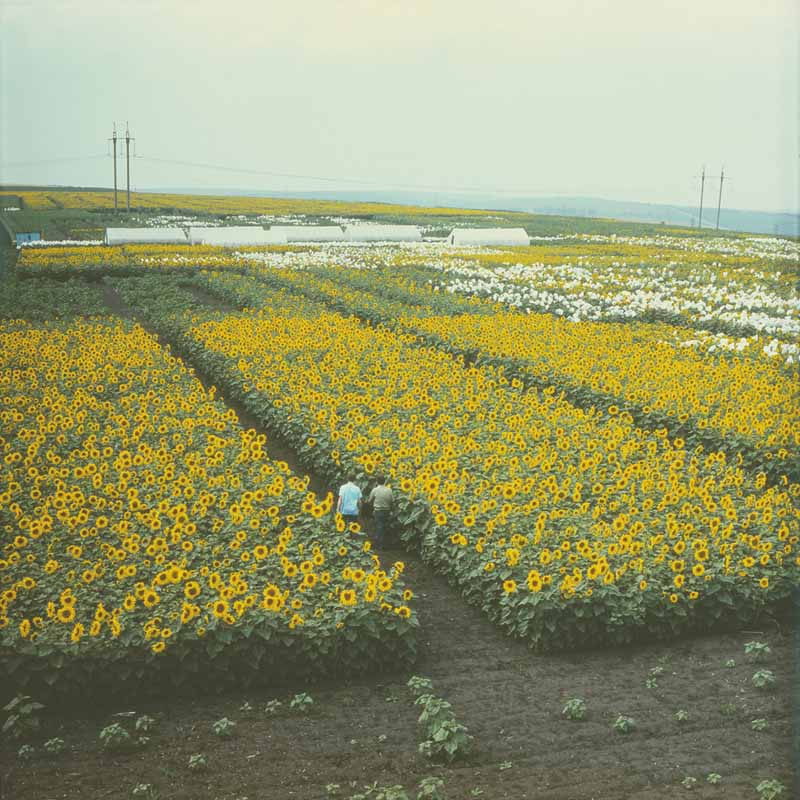
Sunflower fields in Balti, Moldova

Moldova is an agrarian-industrial state, with agricultural land occupying 2,499,000 hectares in a total area of 3,384,600 hectares. It is estimated that 1,810,500 of these hectares are arable. Moldova is located in Eastern Europe, and is landlocked, bordering Romania and Ukraine. Moldova's agricultural sector benefits from a geographical proximity to large markets, namely the European Union. As a share of GDP, agriculture has declined from 56% in 1995 to 13.8% in 2013. Data from 2015 estimated that agriculture accounted for 12% of Moldova's GDP. Agriculture as a sector is export-oriented, with the composition of Moldova's total exports containing agriculture and the agri-food sector as a main component. 70% of agri-food exports in 2012 included beverages, edible fruits and nuts, oilseeds, vegetable preparations and cereals. Here, fruits, vegetables and nuts were attributed to 33% of Moldova's exports for 2011–2013. Moldova is also one of the top ten apple exporters in the world. However, because of the long-term emphasis on fruit, vegetables are often imported.

The declining share of agriculture in GDP does not extend to national value-added, where the agricultural sector in Moldova has the largest share relative to Central and Eastern European countries, withstanding a low productivity. Moldova's growth corresponds to a declining role of agriculture as a sector, and the rising importance of the services sector, aligning with trends for growth of developing economies.

== Present agricultural sector ==
73% of utilised agricultural area is arable land. This percentage is among the highest in Eastern Europe. Moldova's land area can be separated into three differing agro-ecological zones, where terrain, soil type, climate and water availability vary between the Northern, Central and Southern agro-ecological zones. Field crops are most suitable to the Northern agro-ecological zone. The utilisation of land area for agricultural output varies, with horticultural production accounting for 22.3% of agricultural output in 2013. 281,000 hectares of land is occupied by orchards and vineyards, whereas hayfields and pastures cover an estimated 352,300 hectares. These figures can be considered as a percentage of utilised agricultural area (UAA), with permanent crops occupying 10% of UAA, and natural pastures and meadows 17%. Agricultural area in Moldova is not fully utilised, as an estimated 18-20% of this land area is not cultivated as a result of non-use by landowners or scarce resources. Agriculture in Moldova extends to include forestry, hunting and fishing. To consider Moldovan agricultural output, it is characterised by natural potential, human resources and technological efficiency.

The Association Agreement between Moldova and the European Union, signed in 2014, includes the Deep and Comprehensive Free Trade Area (DCFTA), which lays the groundwork for Moldova's entry to the EU market for its goods and services.

=== Natural potential ===
For natural potential, Moldova's temperate climate favours agricultural production, with dry and mild winters, and warm summers with initial intense rainfall. The warm period is on average 190 days annually. In 2010, Moldova had an average air temperature for the year of 10.6 °C. Precipitation as a factor of production lacks consistency per annum. Summer is the wettest season, experiencing 39% of total annual rainfall. In 2010, this rainfall figure was 734mm. Between 1887 and 2010, precipitation annually increased by 66mm. This increase was not consistent, as droughts also occurred during this period, such as in 2009. The drought in 2012 caused a 60% decline in corn production, also affecting other crops including wheat and sunflower as a result of limited water availability as a factor of production.

Soil composition exists as another factor of agricultural production, with Moldovan soil types featuring natural fertility, through being dominated by chernozems. 80% of Moldovan land surface feature chernozems within the soil. Agricultural land varies per hectare, where 27% of this land is considered good quality, and every second hectare is of average quality. The soil composition varies across total agricultural land, depending on the agro-ecological zone of Moldova.

==== Soil degradation and impact on agricultural practice ====
Soil degradation and its effect on the productivity of agricultural land has arisen as a result of decreased forest area, water management and unsustainable agricultural practices. Higher levels of erosion and landslides have arisen due to declining percentages of forest area, which accounts for 11% of total land area. The annual loss of humus (organic soil matter) is estimated to be 5-7 tonnes per hectare, with an annual cost to the economy predicted to be US$239 million per year. The inherent fertile soil composition is threatened and faces disturbance as a result of degradation, upsetting the nitrogen, phosphorus and potassium balances of the soils. 2 million hectares have been affected by degradation over the last 20–25 years.

=== Human resources ===
Agriculture as a source of employment fall from 50% to 28% for the population in 2015, alongside the decline in agricultural output as a share of total output in Moldova. In 2000, half of total employment was provided by agriculture. In terms of human resources for the agricultural sector, the rural population acts as a primary source for employment. For the poorest 40% of Moldova's population, 75% of this population live in rural areas. Agriculture here fills a socio-economic role, as an employer as last resort, and as a method of development for rural areas.

=== Technological efficiency ===
Agricultural output is affected by modern technologies, including machinery, fertilisers and irrigation. A failure to adopt modern agricultural technologies such as drought-resistant crops and anti-hail protection have contributed to volatility in Moldova's agricultural output. Higher input prices during the 2008 financial crisis contributed to the decline in agricultural production. Agricultural inputs of fuel, fertiliser and plant-protective chemicals are imported, with Moldovan agricultural producers subject to risks of price volatility and a decreased international competitiveness.

Irrigation also exists as a factor of production due to Moldova's relatively arid climate. In Moldova, 131,688 hectares are operated with 78 irrigation systems.

== Primary agricultural production ==
Agriculture in Moldova involves horticulture, viticulture and cereal production as primary methods of farming. Primary agricultural production in Moldova consists of the crop and livestock sectors, accounting for 66.3% and 33.7% respectively of 2014 agricultural production. Seven products are the main drivers of 90% of agricultural production, consisting of cereals, grapes, pigs, poultry, milk and fruits and vegetables.

The Moldovan horticulture industry, which is almost entirely made up of small and medium-sized enterprises, is supported by the Fruit Garden of Moldova scheme. The initiative is part of the European Union's assistance to Moldova, and it seeks to promote trade and economic growth, as well as agriculture and rural production.

Shipments of preserved vegetables to the European Union rose by 455% between 2014 and 2016, while exports of Moldovan preserved fruits and nuts more than doubled, and chestnut sales nearly tripled. Between 2015 and 2019, the proportion of Moldovan exports to Europe increased from about 50% to 68%.

Europlant, a family-owned company and onion and potato grower, was founded by Radu Grosu. He received funds from the Garden of Moldova scheme, as well as received €720,000 from the European Union via ProCredit Bank for the building of a warehouse near Moldova's capital, Chisinau.

=== Production ===
Moldova produced in 2018: 1.1 million tons of wheat;

- 788 thousand tons of sunflower seed;
- 730 thousand tons of grape;
- 707 thousand tons of sugar beet (the beet is used to manufacture sugar and ethanol);
- 665 thousand tons of apple;
- 175 thousand tons of barley;
- 174 thousand tons of potato;
- 132 thousand tons of plum;

In addition to smaller productions of other agricultural products, like rapeseed (85 thousand tons). Moldova has a production of grape and apple between the 20th and 25th largest in the world, and a production of plum and sunflower seed between the 10th and 15th largest of the world.

=== Crop sector ===
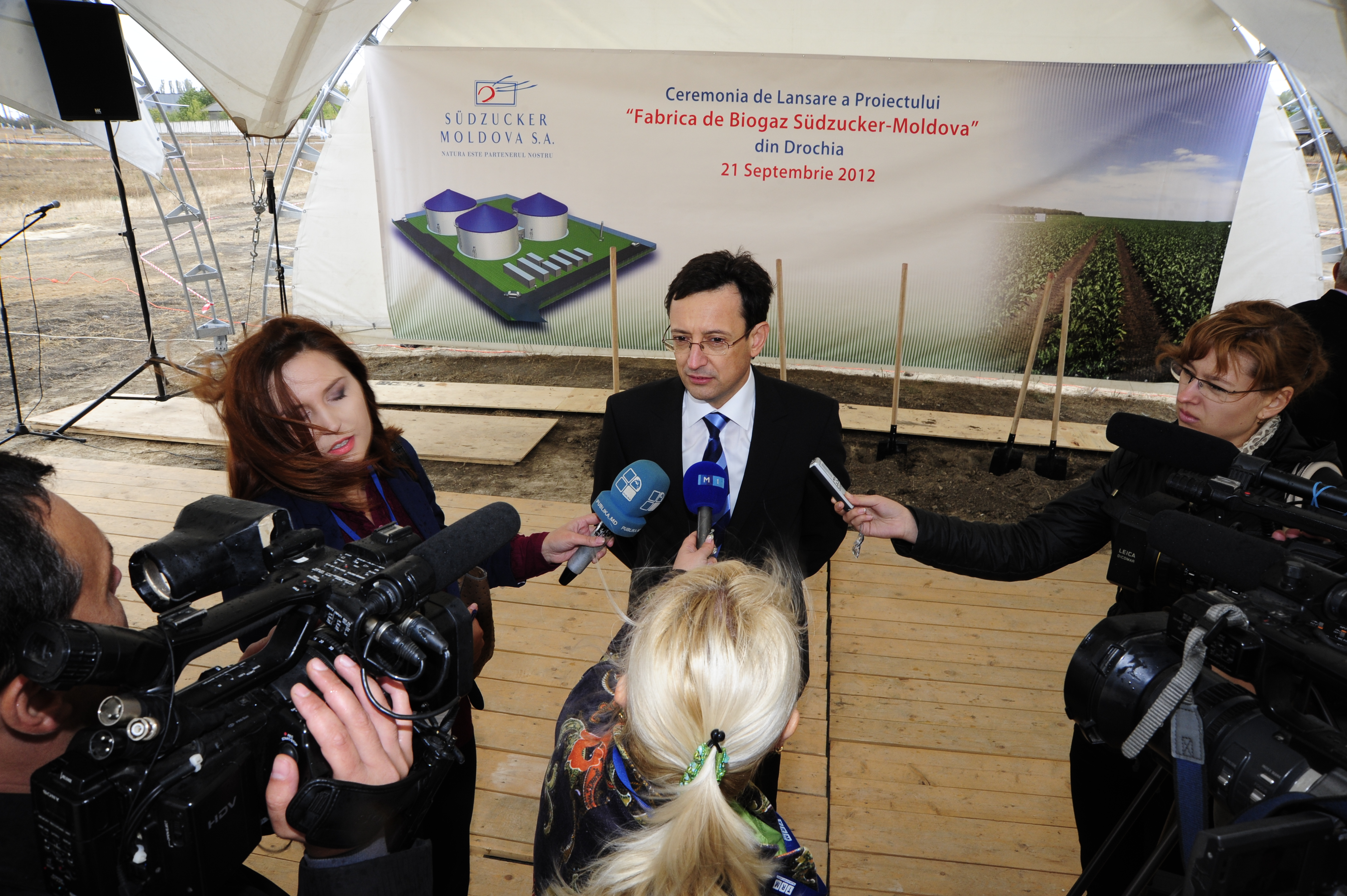
Octavian Armașu, CFO of Südzucker Moldova, during the inauguration a biogas factory in Drochia, 2012

Crop production favoured 60-70% of total agricultural production over the period 2001–2012. There is a focus in this sector towards bulk raw materials for export, to both the Commonwealth of Independent States and EU. Low value-added crops dominate the sector, with 80% of the cultivated land area occupying cereal, oilseeds, sugar beet and fodder crops. As of 2014, Südzucker Moldova, a branch of the German Südzucker, accounted for 62% of Moldovan sugar production.

Cereals in particular account for a high share of arable land, of 70% of total sown areas. Moldova's primary crops as a result of the importance of the cereal sector include wheat, barley, corn and rapeseed. Specifically, wheat, corn and barley occupy more than half of sown land area in Moldova. 894,000 hectares of Moldova's land area were cultivated for cereals and legumes in 2011, grain maize in 455,500 of these hectares, and wheat in 301,800 hectares. In 2011, crop harvest produced 2,498,200 tons of cereals and leguminous crops for the period. The focus on cereal production has arisen from low capital requirements, reliable market demand and ease of large-scale mechanisation for production.

Agricultural enterprises are more specialised in grain crop production, as well as sunflower, grapes and sugar beet. This differs from individual farms, where the focus is centralised towards grapes, potatoes, vegetables and fruits, maize and fodder. High-value added products have a low level of production, due to investment requirements and irrigation availability. These products such as fruits and vegetables also rely on imported seeds or seedlings, with initial requirements costly for production. Fruit and vegetable crops account for less than 20% of UAA.

Sandunelu, a carrot, onion, and beetroot grower, produces about 60% of the onions and carrots sold in Moldovan supermarkets. The company was awarded €492,000 by Mobiasbanca, which is backed by the European Investment Bank. Business consulting assistance was also given to the firm, which aided in the preparation of loan paperwork.

=== Viticulture ===
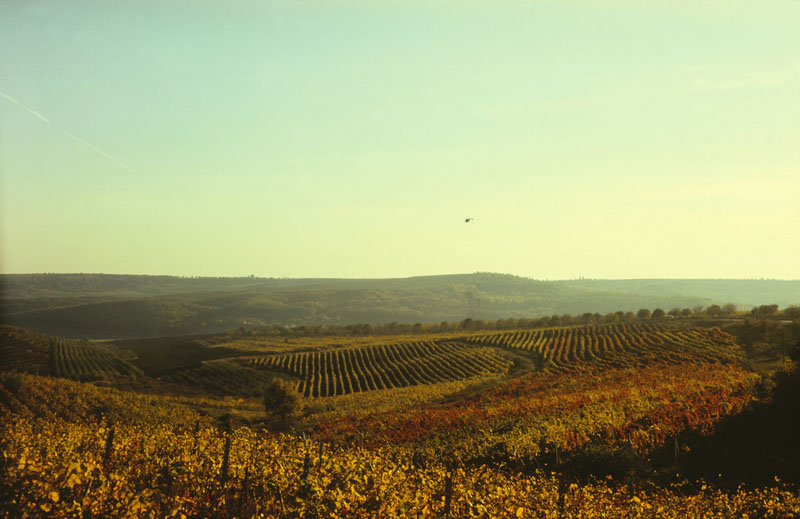
Vineyards in Ialoveni district, Moldova

Moldova is listed as a top ten country for the manufacture and exportation of wine. The sector is export-oriented, accounting for 11% of total Moldovan exports in 2011. This percentage has fallen from 35% in 2005. The usage of arable land extends to viticulture, as a component of Moldova's export basket, with wine constituting 11% of Moldova's exports in 2011. As a share of industrial output, wine accounted for 7% of this figure between 2008 and 2010. Between 2011 and 2013, wine as an export grew to almost 16% of Moldova's export value. 139.9 thousand hectares are estimated to be cultivated and utilised through vineyards. As of 2014, licenses for production in viticulture were held by 191 wineries in Moldova. Two of Moldova's nine organic processing units are involved in the growth of organic grapes for the production of organic wine.

=== Livestock sector ===
In 2011, 61.2% of all agricultural holdings were involved in raising livestock. Beside the decline of total agricultural production, livestock counts have also descended, where in the period 2001–2010, 16% of pigs and 40% of cattle in holding fell. The livestock sector in Moldova carries a smaller role in agricultural production in comparison to the crop sector. Lower output levels in the sector position Moldova as a net importer of the bulk of livestock products. This role in output holds stability and is characterised by lower levels of competitiveness. For the livestock sector, domestic resource constraints act as a barrier to production capacity. Another effect limiting the livestock sector is climate change, with production influenced by higher temperatures and more frequent fluctuations in precipitation.

=== Organic agriculture ===
2.87% of Moldova's arable land area was used for organic agricultural production. An estimate of 94% of this land area is operated by land holdings sized 50 hectares or more. Organic agriculture as a component of Moldova's agricultural sector contributed to an estimated 3.18% of agricultural export value in 2013. These registered exports amounted to $31.5EURO million, at an export level of more than 80,000 tonnes. 59 organic producers were registered in Moldova as of 2013. Organic agriculture has increased in growth from EU market demand, policies in support of the sector and a higher price premium for producers.

== History of agriculture in Moldova ==
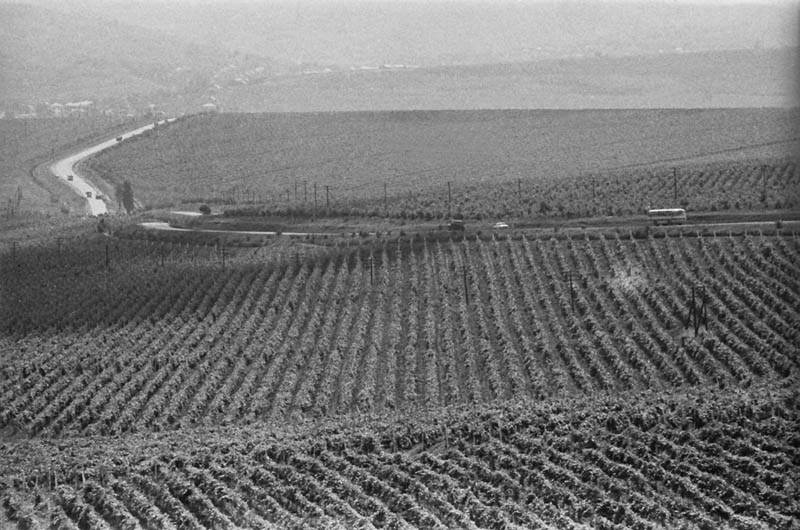
Hîncești district, Moldova in 1980

As of 1995, agricultural production delivered an estimated 40% of total production in Moldova, employing an estimated 1/3 of the total labour force. Between 1987 and 1990, Moldova's trade basket featured agricultural and food products as more than 50% of total exports. The composition of the sector in 1989-1990 involved the crop sector accounting for 60% of agricultural output's value, and the livestock sector contributing to 40%. Agricultural land for this period was 2.3 million hectares, of which arable land was 1.5 million hectares. Historically, agricultural output has accounted for a larger percentage of GDP, where between 1995 and 1997 it accounted for 27.39%, in comparison to 9.03% for 2007–2009. In the period 1989–1993, total agricultural output was estimated to have declined by 33% for Moldova. The decline in agriculture transpired within the livestock sector, with a fall in meat production by 40% between 1991 and 1993. Moldova as a former member of the Soviet Union historically had access to a sizeable market, as in 1972, where Moldova's livestock exports accounted for 1% of cattle and 2% of pigs in the USSR.

In July 2022 the European Union agreed Autonomous Trade Measures, being the suspension of import duties and raising of quotas on Moldovan exports to the EU, designed to help Moldovan agriculture following the Russian invasion of Ukraine which created a difficult situation for Moldovan producers. Renewed in 2023 for another year.

== Climate change effect on agriculture in Moldova ==
For the agricultural sector, the inextricable relationship between agriculture and climatic conditions, including temperature and precipitation, results in climate volatility as a risk. The direct and indirect interdependence between agriculture and the rural population exposes climate change as a problem for the economy, due to socio-economic vulnerability. Climate volatility has historically contributed to decreased yields and elevated risks for Moldova's agriculture sector. Natural hazards in 2007 affected Moldova's GDP between 3.5-7%, with the majority of losses in the agricultural sector and rural areas.

Records of Moldova's average temperature provide evidence of an increase in 1 °C for annual average temperatures between 1887 and 2010. Cumulative climate data supports the trend of increasing temperature and has been observed by farmers in greater extremity of heat events.

Weather events have increased in severity, longevity and frequency, in particular for droughts and floods. With extended droughts leading to a depleted water supply, irrigation demands have increased. Due to Moldova existing as a relatively arid climate, irrigation exists as a factor of production for cropping in agriculture. The divergence between irrigation availability opposed to demand for irrigation result in unmet demands, leading to conflict over water resources. The effects of climate change on water resources in Moldova vary, and have been progressive over time. 26% of the decline in Moldova's output in 1994 was attributable to natural disasters, primarily the severe drought. The droughts in 1992 and 1994 were considered uncommon, but examination of precipitation patterns revealed the risks of drought had increased, as well as their potential for greater severity. More variability in precipitation as a result of climate change has increased the risk of floods in addition to drought. The floods in 2010 carried an impact of an estimated 0.15% decrease on Moldova's GDP, with an estimated cost of US$42 million. The impact of these floods was felt largely in agricultural areas in Moldova.
