= Leonid Talmaci =

Moldovan politician (born 1954)

Leonid Talmaci OR
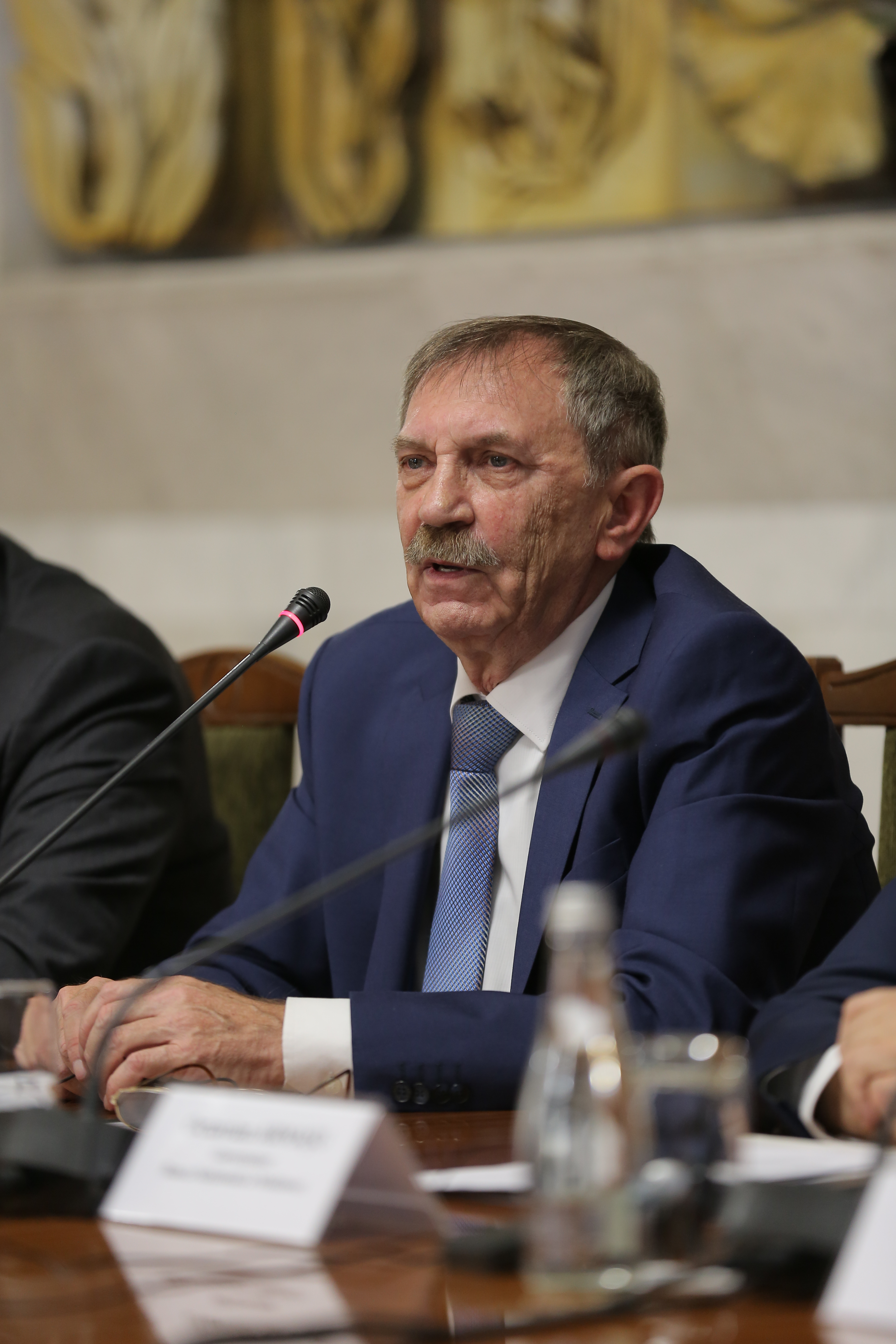
- Talmaci in 2023

1st Governor of the National Bank of Moldova
- In office 4 June 1991 – 6 November 2009
- Succeeded by: Dorin Drăguțanu

Personal details
- Born: April 26, 1954 (age 72) Reteni, Moldavian SSR, Soviet Union

Leonid Talmaci (born 26 April 1954) is a Moldovan economist. He was born in Reteni and served as the head of the National Bank of Moldova (1991–2009).

He was a candidate in the Moldovan presidential election, 2011–2012.

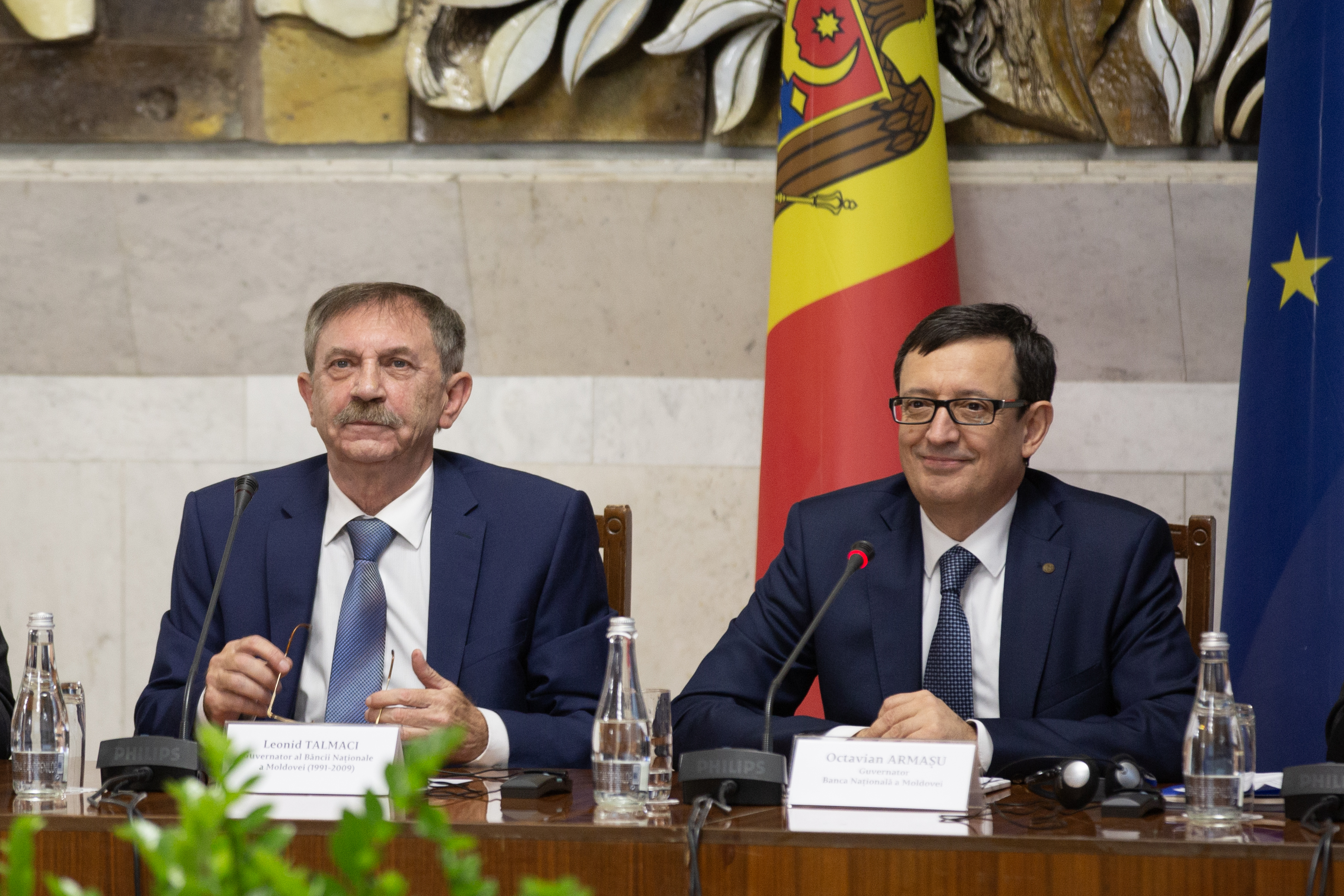
Talmaci with NBM governor Octavian Armașu, November 2023
