= Moldovan leu =

Currency of Moldova

leu moldovenesc (Romanian)
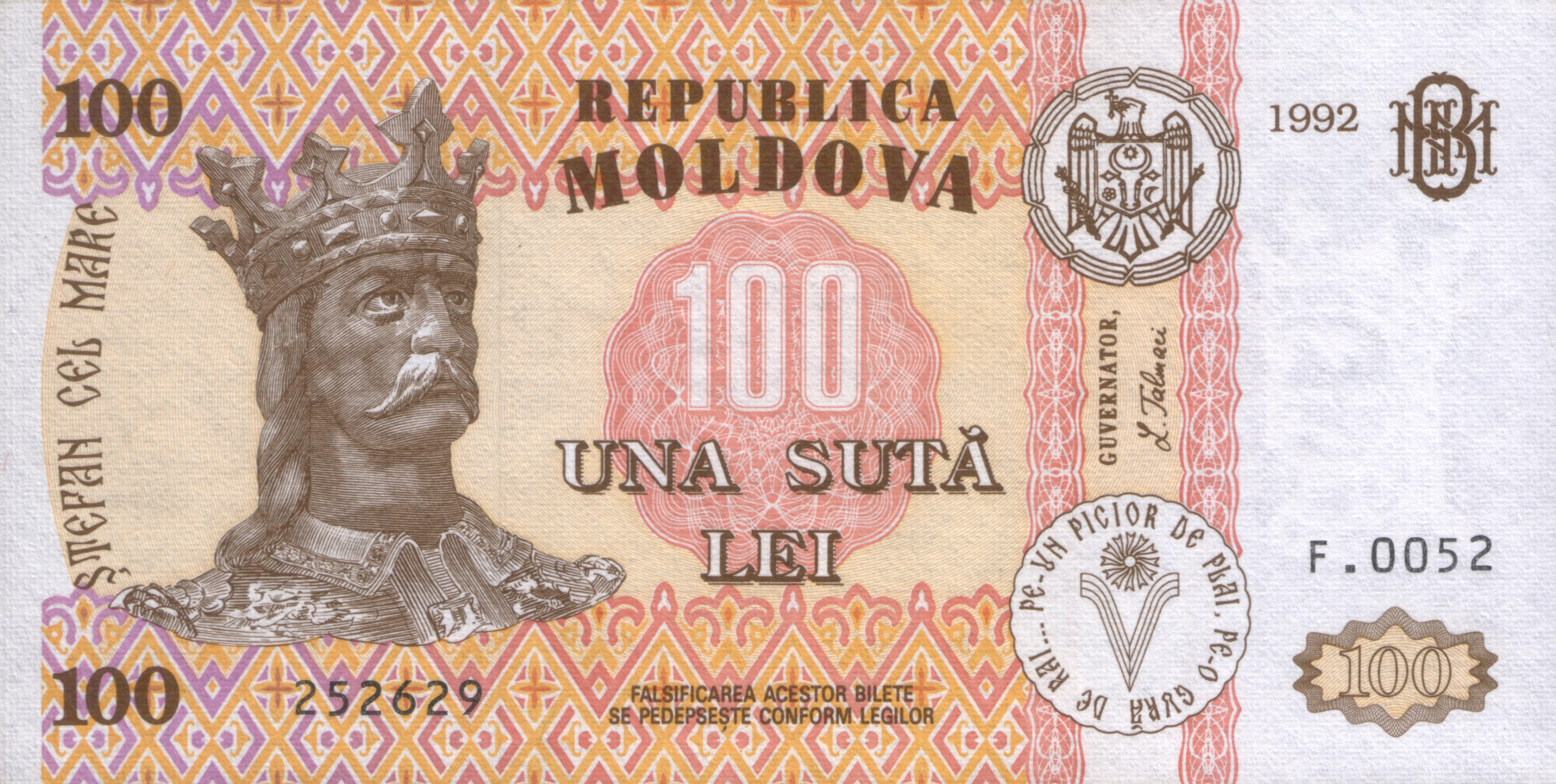
- 100 lei note obverse

ISO 4217
- Code: MDL (numeric: 498)
- Subunit: 0.01

Units of account
- Plural: lei
- Subunit
- 1/100: ban
- Plural
- ban: bani

Denominations
- Banknotes
- Freq. used: 20, 50, 100, 200, 500, 1000 lei
- Rarely used: 1, 5, 10 lei
- Coins
- Freq. used: 1 leu, 2, 5, 10 lei
- Rarely used: 1, 5, 10, 25, 50 bani

Demographics
- Date of introduction: 29 November 1993
- Replaced: Russian ruble
- User(s): Moldova (except Transnistria)

Issuance
- Central bank: National Bank of Moldova
- Website: www.bnm.md

Valuation
- Inflation: 4%
- Source: National Bank of Moldova, April 2024

The Moldovan leu (Romanian pronunciation: [lew], plural lei [lej]; abbreviation: L; ISO 4217 code: MDL) is the currency of Moldova. Like the Romanian leu, the Moldovan leu is subdivided into 100 bani (sg. ban). The name of the currency originates from a Romanian word which means "lion".

== Etymology ==
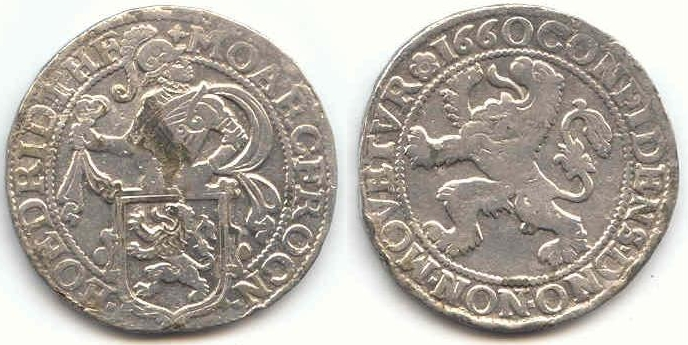
Dutch Thaler, depicting a lion, the origin of the Moldovan "Leu"

The name of the currency means "lion", and is derived from the Dutch thaler (leeuwendaalder "lion thaler/dollar"). The Dutch leeuwendaalder was imitated in several German and Italian cities. These coins circulated in Moldova, Romania and Bulgaria and gave their name to their respective currencies: the Moldovan leu, the Romanian leu and the Bulgarian lev.

== History ==
From 1918 to 1940 and again from 1941 to 1944, Moldova was part of Romania and the Romanian leu was used in what was then the eastern part of the broader Romanian region of Moldavia (Moldova in Romanian). The Moldovan leu was established on 29 November 1993, following the collapse of the Soviet ruble and the creation of the independent Republic of Moldova. It replaced the temporary cupon and Russian ruble at a rate 1000 = 1 MDL.

In Transnistria, an unrecognized breakaway state which is internationally recognized as part of Moldova, the Transnistrian ruble is used instead. The currency is not honoured in Moldova or any other state. In May 2019, Octavian Armașu, governor of the National Bank of Moldova from 2018 to 2023, described the acceptance of the Moldovan leu in Transnistria as a prerequisite for the region's integration into the Moldovan banking system.

== Coins ==
A first series of mostly small aluminum coins entered circulation in November 1993. A second series consisting of larger denomination coins was issued in 2018. Most Moldovan coins are minted at the Monetăria Statului in Romania.

=== First series (1993–present) ===
In November 1993, the National Bank of Moldova (NBM) issued its first coins of 1, 5, 25 and 50 bani and 1 and 5 lei.

The 1 and 5 lei coins were withdrawn from circulation in 1994. Due to their low quality and relatively high nominal value, many forgeries appeared.

In April 1996, a 10 bani coin was introduced.

In 1997, the NBM announced that it would replace the existing aluminum 50 bani coin with a new one made from brass-plated steel with a new and improved design featuring anti-counterfeit elements such as reeding, a first for modern Moldovan coins.

The new 50 bani coins were put into circulation on 2 February 1998. At the same time the NBM began withdrawing old aluminum 50 bani coins. They were demonetized on 1 January 1999.

1 ban coins remain legal tender but are rarely used or seen in circulation, effectively leading to "Swedish rounding".

Coins of the first series (1993–present)
Image	Value	Technical parameters			Description			Date of			
Image	Value	Diameter	Mass	Composition	Edge	Obverse	Reverse	minting	issue	withdrawal	lapse
	1 ban	14.5 mm	0.67 g	Aluminum	Plain	Denomination, year of minting	Coat of arms, country name	1993~2017	29 November 1993	Current, but not issued for general circulation	
	5 bani	16 mm	0.75 g	Aluminum	Plain	Denomination, year of minting	Coat of arms, country name	1993~2018	29 November 1993	Current	
	10 bani	16.6 mm	0.85 g	Aluminum	Plain	Denomination, year of minting	Coat of arms, country name	1995~2018	29 November 1993	Current	
	25 bani	17.5 mm	0.95g	Aluminum	Plain	Denomination, year of minting	Coat of arms, country name	1993~2020	29 November 1993	Current	
	50 bani	19 mm	1.07 g	Aluminum	Plain	Denomination, year of minting	Coat of arms, country name	1993	29 November 1993	1 January 1999	
	50 bani	19 mm	3.1 g	Brass-plated steel	Reeded	Grapevine with grapes and leaves, denomination, year of minting	Coat of arms, country name	1997~2018	2 February 1998	Current	
	1 leu	20,1 mm	3,3 g	Nickel clad steel	Plain	Denomination, year of minting	Coat of arms, country name	1992	29 November 1993	1994	
	5 lei	22,0 mm	3,6 g	Nickel clad steel	Plain	Denomination, year of minting	Coat of arms, country name	1993	29 November 1993	1994	
These images are to scale at 2.5 pixels per millimetre. For table standards, see the coin specification table.

=== Second series (2018–present) ===
In 2017, the NBM announced plans to reintroduce 1 and 5 lei coins alongside new 2 and 10 lei coins citing "superior durability and cheaper manufacturing and maintenance cost over time compared to banknotes" as the main reason and asking people to submit their designs for the new coins. The design of the new coins was unveiled on February 28, 2018, featuring elements of both the coat of arms of the Principality of Moldavia on the obverse and the coat of arms of the Republic of Moldova on the reverse, with 1 and 2 lei coins being made from nickel-plated steel and 5 and 10 lei coins featuring a bi-metallic design with elements made from nickel-plated steel and brass-plated steel. The new coins were put into circulation starting 28 February 2018. All of the new lei coins are currently intended to be used alongside banknotes of equal value.

Coins of the second series (2018–present)
Image	Value	Technical parameters				Description			Date of	
Image	Value	Diameter	Thickness	Mass	Composition	Edge	Obverse	Reverse	First minting	First issue
	1 leu	21.5 mm	1.8 mm	4.45 g	Nickel-plated steel	Segmented (Plain and reeded sections (3 groups))	Female-faced crescent, part of an aurochs' head, coat of arms, state title	Denomination, year of minting, the letters "R" and "M" in latent image, and part of the coat of arms on the background	2018	April 2018
	2 lei	23.7 mm	2.2 mm	6.7 g	Nickel-plated steel	Reeded	Male-faced Sun, part of an aurochs' head, coat of arms, state title	Denomination, year of minting, the letters "R" and "M" in latent image, and part of the coat of arms on the background	2018	April 2018
	5 lei	24.4 mm	2.25 mm	7.1 g	Center plug: Nickel-plated steel Outer ring: Brass-plated steel	Segmented (Plain and reeded sections (5 groups))	The horns of an aurochs' (part of its head), surmounted by an open crown, an eight pointed star between the horns, a heraldic rose, coat of arms, state title	Denomination, year of minting, the letters "R" and "M" in latent image, and part of the coat of arms on the background	2018	early 2019
	10 lei	25.3 mm	2.3 mm	7.65 g	Center plug: Brass-plated steel Outer ring: Nickel-plated steel	Reeded with inscription: Reeded, "MOLDOVA*MOLDOVA*"	Personal coat of arms of Stephen the Great, part of an aurochs' head, coat of arms, state title	Denomination, year of minting, the letters "R" and "M" in latent image, and part of the coat of arms on the background	2018	early 2019

=== Commemorative coins ===
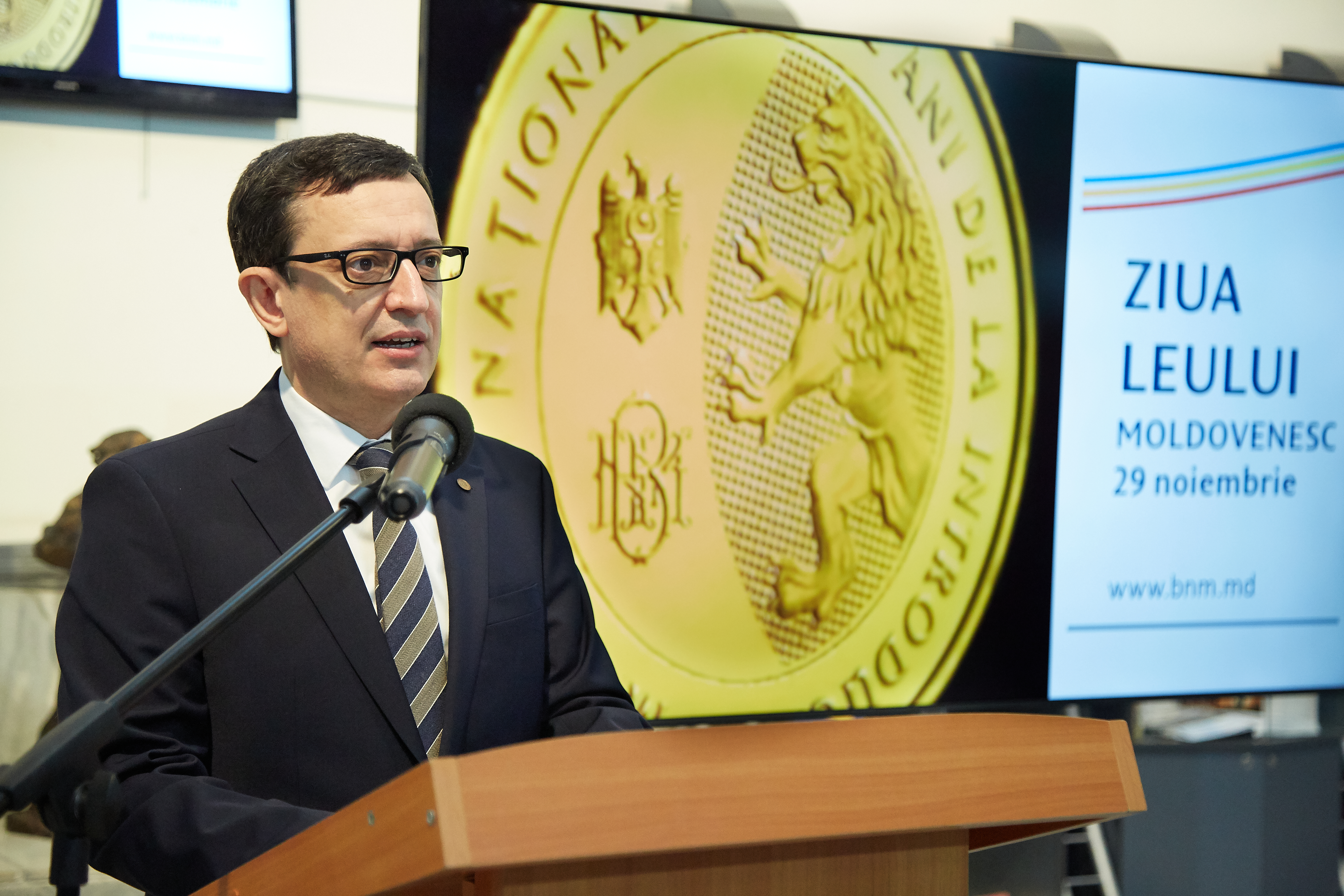
NBM governor Octavian Armașu speaking during the 2021 annual celebration of the Moldovan leu held on 29 November

Since 1996, several commemorative coins for collectors have been issued.

== Banknotes ==
There have been two series of Moldovan leu banknotes. The first series was short-lived and only included 1, 5, and 10 lei. The front of all of these notes—and all subsequent notes—feature a portrait of Ștefan cel Mare (Stephen the Great, also known as Stephen III of Moldavia), the prince of Moldavia from 1457 to 1504.

The first two lines of the Miorița (The Little Ewe) ballad appear on the back, printed vertically between the denomination numeral and the vignette of the fortress. These lines, “Pe-un picior de plai, pe-o gură de rai”, translate as “near a low foothill at Heaven’s threshold”.

Second Series
Image		Value	Dimensions	Main Colour	Description			Date of	
Obverse	Reverse	Value	Dimensions	Main Colour	Obverse	Reverse	Watermark	first printing	issue
		1 leu	114 × 58 mm	Yellow	Stephen III	Căpriana monastery	As portrait	1994	May 1994
		5 lei	114 × 58 mm	Cyan	Stephen III	St. Dumitru Church, Orhei	As portrait	1994	April 1994
		10 lei	121 × 61 mm	Red	Stephen III	Hîrjauca monastery	As portrait	1994	May 1994
		20 lei	121 × 61 mm	Green	Stephen III	Soroca Fort	As portrait	1992	November 1993
		50 lei	121 × 61 mm	Pink	Stephen III	Hîrbovăț monastery	As portrait	1992	May 1994
		100 lei	121 × 61 mm	Orange	Stephen III	Tighina Fortress	As portrait	1992	September 1995
		200 lei	133 × 66 mm	Purple	Stephen III	Chișinău City Hall	As portrait	1992	September 1995
		500 lei	133 × 66 mm	Orange and green	Stephen III	Chișinău Cathedral	As portrait	1992	December 1999
		1000 lei	133 × 66 mm	Blue	Stephen III	Presidential Palace	As portrait	1992	October 2003
For table standards, see the banknote specification table.

- On the front side of each banknote only one man is represented - the best-known ruler of Moldavia - Ștefan cel Mare (Stephen the Great).
- The first two lines of the Miorița ballad are written in the white circle on the front side of each banknote.
- On the back side of all the banknotes there are depicted Trajan's Column and The Endless Column.

Moldovan leu banknotes were notable for not using intaglio printing until 2015: the main security features on all denominations were limited, initially consisting mainly of a watermark of Ștefan, a solid security thread, and a see-through registration device. In 2015, the National Bank of Moldova finally rolled out intaglio printing and embossing for denominations between 10 and 500 lei, and also introduced revised security features on all denominations except for 1,000 lei. The banknote for 1,000 lei continues to use the original design.

== Exchange rates ==
Current MDL exchange rates
From Google Finance:	AUD CAD CHF CNY EUR GBP HKD JPY USD RON RUB UAH
From Yahoo! Finance:	AUD CAD CHF CNY EUR GBP HKD JPY USD RON RUB UAH
From XE.com:	AUD CAD CHF CNY EUR GBP HKD JPY USD RON RUB UAH
From OANDA:	AUD CAD CHF CNY EUR GBP HKD JPY USD RON RUB UAH

== See also ==
- Economy of Moldova
- Romanian leu
- Bulgarian lev
- Moldova
