= Braniște, Rîșcani =

Braniște
- Commune
- Location in Moldova
- Coordinates: 47°48′N 27°15′E
- Country: Moldova
- District: Rîșcani District

Population (2014)
  - Total: 1,275
- Time zone: UTC+2 (EET)
  - Summer (DST): UTC+3 (EEST)

Braniște is a commune in Rîșcani District, Moldova. It is composed of four villages: Avrămeni, Braniște, Reteni and Reteni-Vasileuți.

== Notable people ==
- Alexandru Moșanu (1932–2017), Romanian-Moldavian historian and politician
- Boris Vieru (1957–2019), Moldovan politician
- Leonid Tălmaci (born 1954), Moldovan politician, governor of the National Bank of Moldova
