= Alexandru Moșanu =

First President of the Moldovan Parliament

Alexandru Moșanu OR
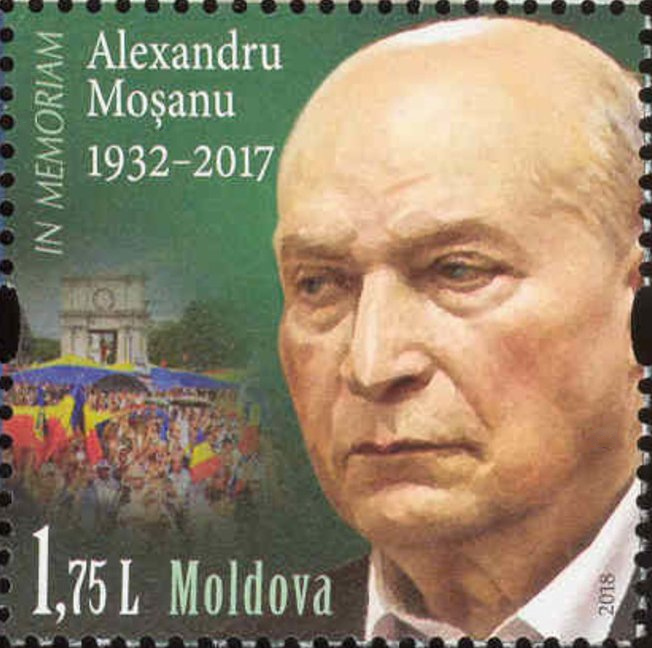
- 2018 stamp of Moldova

1st President of the Moldovan Parliament
- In office 27 August 1991 – 2 February 1993
- President: Mircea Snegur
- Prime Minister: Valeriu Muravschi; Andrei Sangheli
- Deputy: Ion Hadârcă
- Succeeded by: Petru Lucinschi

Member of the Moldovan Parliament
- In office 17 April 1990 – 25 February 2001
- Parliamentary group: Popular Front
- Constituency: Strășeni

Chairman of the Supreme Soviet of SSR Moldova
- In office 3 September 1990 – 27 August 1991
- President: Mircea Snegur
- Prime Minister: Mircea Druc
- Preceded by: Mircea Snegur

Personal details
- Born: 19 July 1932 Braniște, Kingdom of Romania
- Died: 7 December 2017 (aged 85) Chișinău, Moldova
- Citizenship: Moldova; Romania
- Party: Social Liberal Party (Moldova)
- Other political affiliations: Popular Front of Moldova
- Education: Moldova State University
- Profession: Historian

Alexandru Moșanu (19 July 1932 – 7 December 2017) was a Moldovan politician, historian and professor.

== Biography ==
Alexandru Moșanu was born in Braniște, Kingdom of Romania (now in Rîșcani District, Moldova). He was the first speaker of the Parliament of the Republic of Moldova between 1990 and 1993. He was also one of the co-authors of Moldova's 1991 Declaration of Independence.

Moșanu was the author of over 100 works on the history of Moldova and Romania. His most important contribution as an author is a study on Romanian historiography published in Moscow in 1988. In 1993, he became a foreign honorary member of the Romanian Academy. Between 2002 and 2005 Moșanu was the Honorary Chairman of the Social Liberal Party.

He was a leader of the Democratic Forum of Romanians in Moldova.

== Awards ==
- Romanian Cultural Institute Prize

== Works ==
- Mișcări sociale și politice din România în epoca modernă
- Istoriografia românească
- Unitatea poporului român și Mișcarea de Renaștere și de Eliberare Națională a românilor basarabeni
- Alexandru Moșanu, Destin Românesc, Chișinău, 1994;
- Alexandru Moșanu, Un pilon de granit al Rezistenţei basarabene în Literatura și Arta, 17 iulie 2003.
