= Südzucker =

Major German sugar producer

Südzucker AG
- Company type: Aktiengesellschaft
- Traded as: FWB: SZU; SDAX
- Industry: Food processing
- Predecessor: Zuckerraffinerie Genthin
- Founded: 1926
- Headquarters: Mannheim, Germany
- Key people: Dr. Niels Pörksen (CEO and spokesman of the executive board), Hans-Jörg Gebhard (Chairman of the supervisory board)
- Products: Sugar, starch, processed fruit products, frozen and chilled pizza, bioethanol
- Revenue: €7.6 billion (2021)
- Net income: €123 million (2021)
- Total assets: €8.441 billion (February 2022)
- Total equity: €3.699 billion (February 2022)
- Number of employees: 18,019 (2021)
- Website: www.suedzucker.de/en/

Südzucker AG (German pronunciation: [ˈzyːtˌtsʊkɐ], literally South sugar) is a German company, the largest sugar producer in the world, with an annual production of around 4.8 million tonnes.

In February 2014, Germany’s Federal Cartel Office imposed a joint fine of 280 million euros on the company – together with its competitors Nordzucker and Pfeifer & Langen – for allegations of anticompetitive agreements.

== History ==
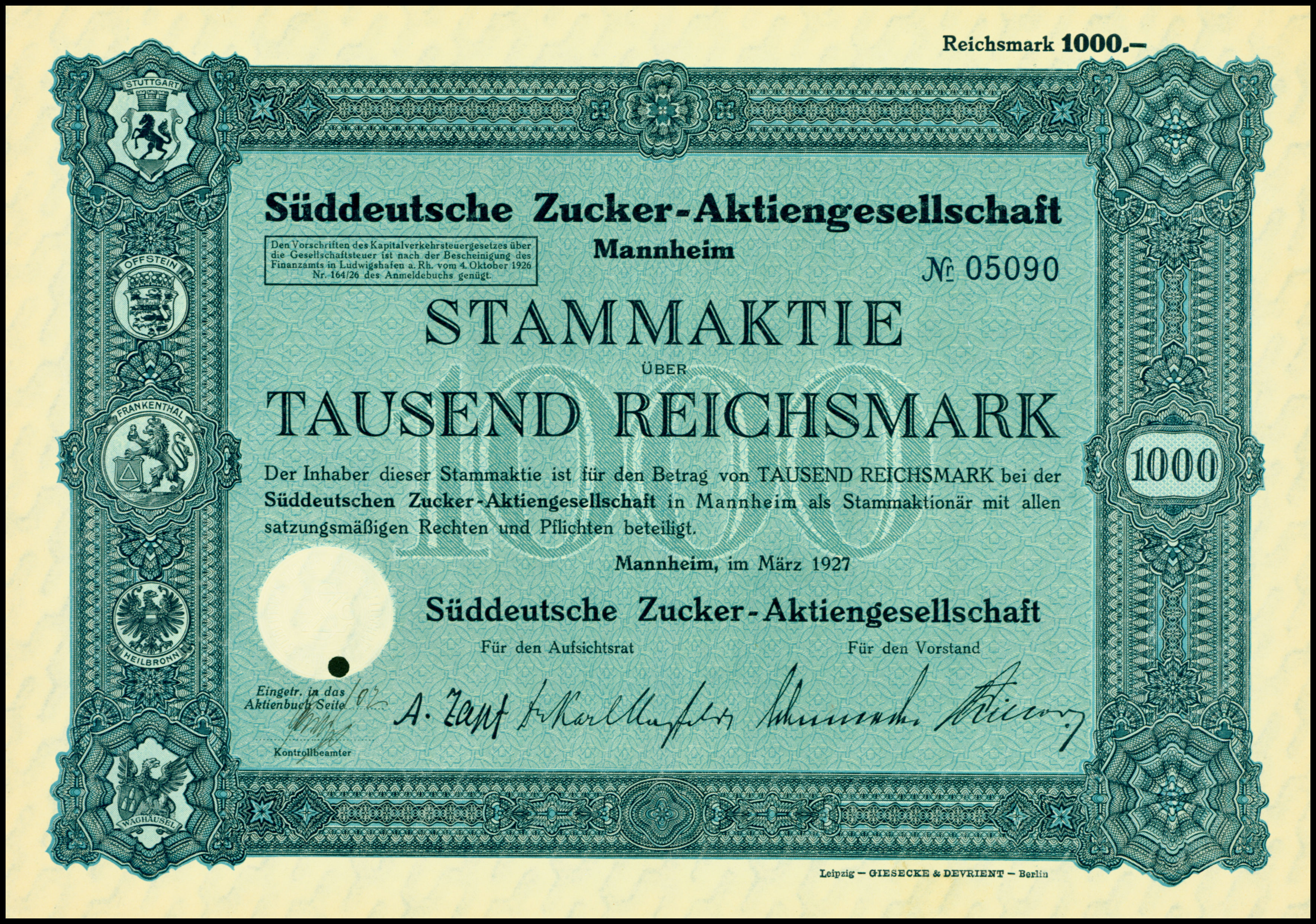
Share of 1000 RM of Süddeutsche Zucker-AG from March 1927

Südzucker traces its origins to Süddeutsche-Zucker-AG, which was formed in 1926 through the merger of five regional sugar factories (Zuckerfabrik Frankenthal AG; Zuckerfabrik Heilbronn AG; Badische Gesellschaft für Zuckerfabrikation; Zuckerfabrik Offstein AG; Zuckerfabrik Stuttgart). Its corporate predecessor is Zuckerfabrik Frankenthal AG. In 1837, the Badische Gesellschaft für Zuckerfabrikation purchased Eremitage Castle in Waghäusel from the Grand Duchy of Baden and, on the castle’s 13‑hectare grounds, established the Waghäusel sugar factory, which operated until 1995. During World War II, almost all of the company’s production capacity was destroyed, and after the war it also lost the plants located in the Soviet occupation zone to expropriation. In the 1950s, the remaining factories were rebuilt and expanded. In 1988, the company merged with Zuckerfabrik Franken GmbH of Ochsenfurt and was renamed Südzucker Mannheim/Ochsenfurt, with its headquarters in Mannheim and major administrative offices in both Mannheim and Ochsenfurt.

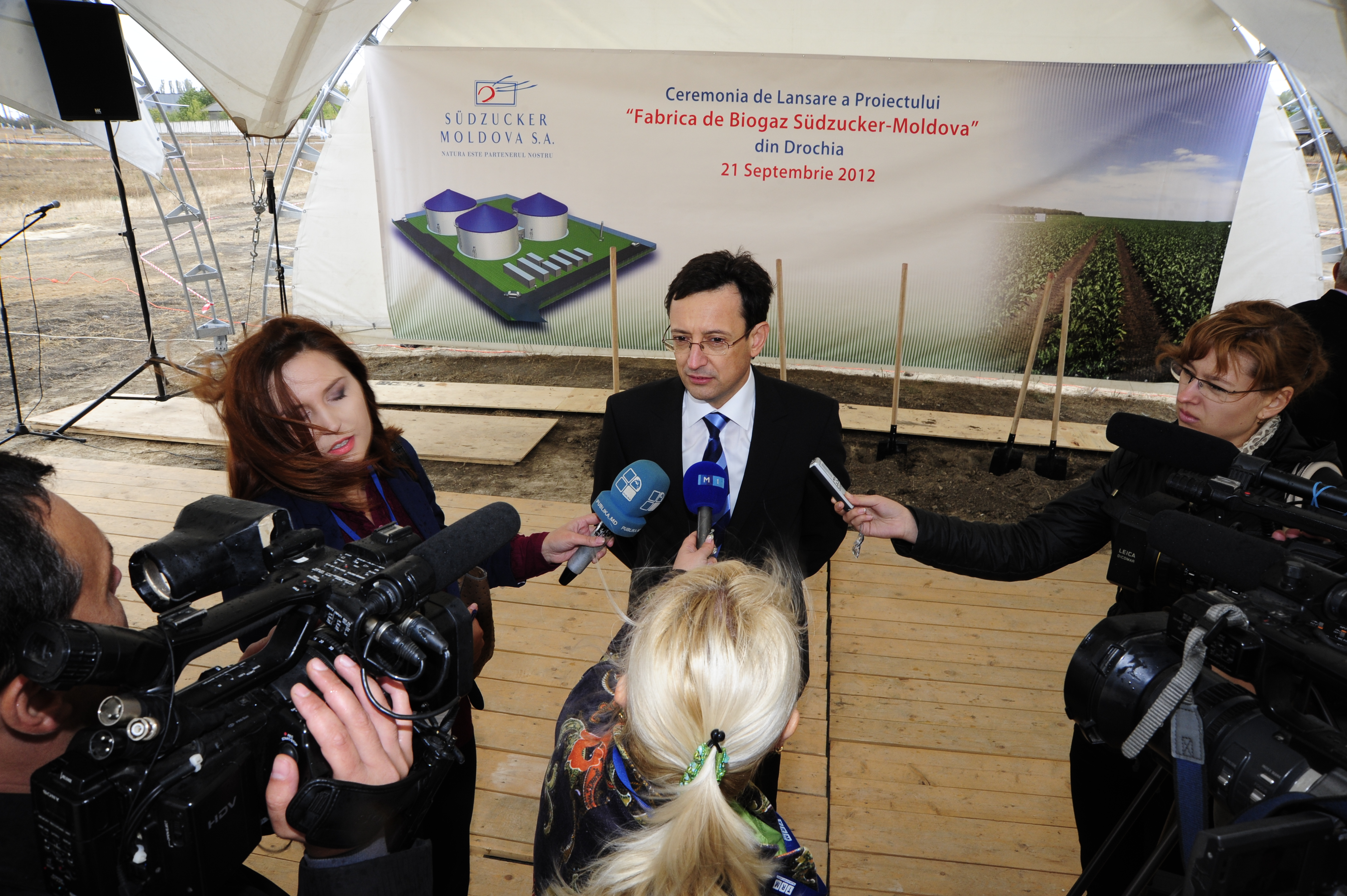
Inauguration of a new Südzucker Moldova biogas factory with Octavian Armașu being interviewed

From 2004 to 2016, Octavian Armașu, future finance minister and governor of the National Bank of Moldova, served as CFO of the Moldovan branch.

== Group segments ==
=== Sugar segment ===
The company has 30 sugar factories and three refineries in Austria, Belgium, Czech Republic, France, Germany, Hungary, Moldova, Poland, Romania, Slovakia, and Bosnia-Herzegovina.

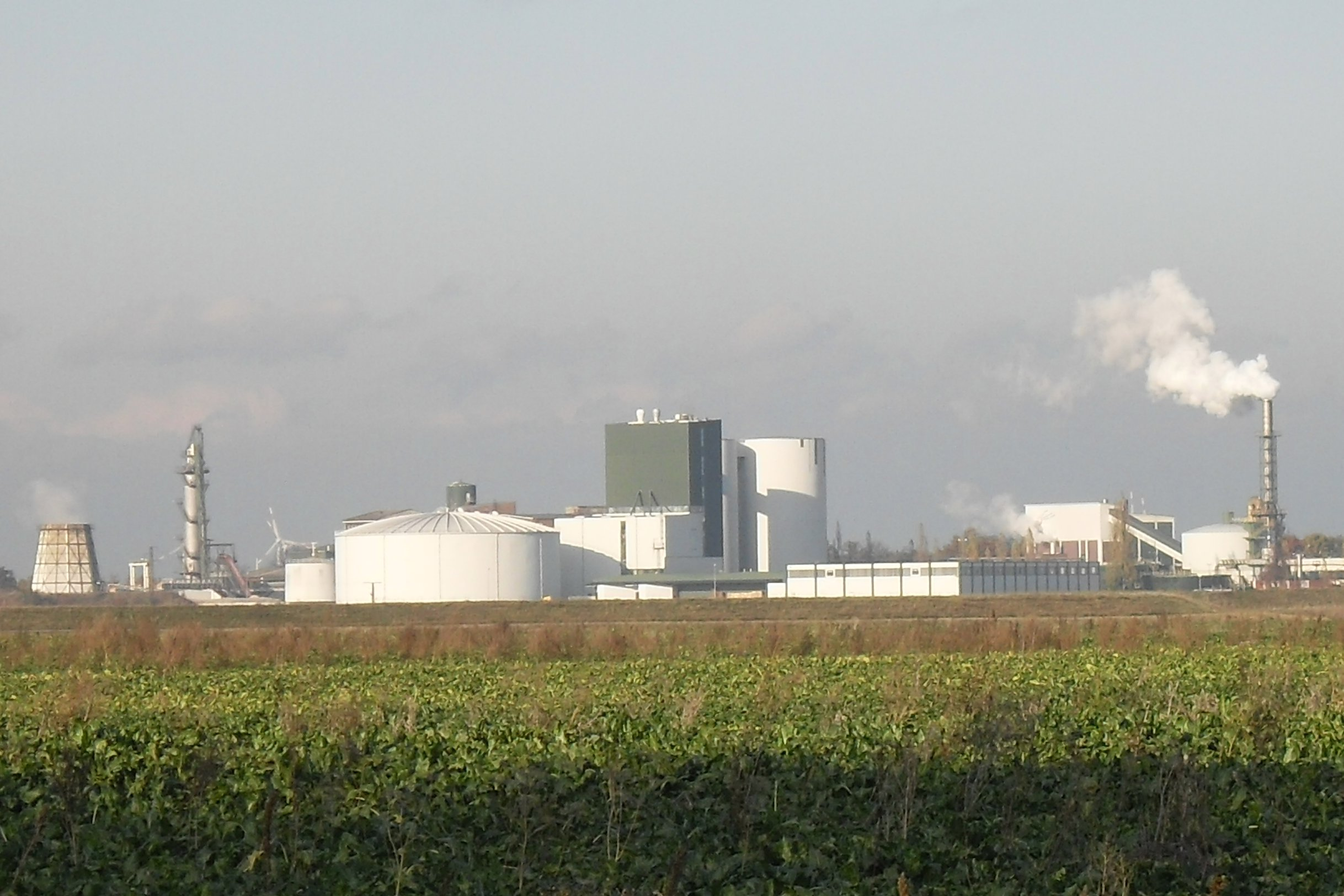
Beet sugar factory in Brottewitz (Germany) of Südzucker AG

=== Special Products segment ===
- BENEO-Palatinit GmbH, Mannheim
- Freiberger Lebensmittel GmbH & Co KG, Berlin
- PrimAS Tiefkühlprodukte GmbH, Oberhofen im Inntal, Austria
- Stateside Foods Ltd., Westhoughton, United Kingdom

=== CropEnergies segment ===
CropEnergies AG, Mannheim (bioethanol production) operates 4 production sites in Germany (Zeitz), Belgium (Wanze), France (Loon-Plage), and the UK (Ensus Ltd in Wilton). The Zeitz plant is located adjacent to the beet sugar factory.

=== Fruit segment ===
==== Fruit preparations ====
Südzucker has 26 production sites in Argentina, Austria, Australia, Belgium, Brazil, China. Czech Republic, Fiji, France, Germany, Mexico, Morocco, Poland, Russia, Serbia, South Africa, South Korea, Turkey, Ukraine, and the United States.

==== Fruit juice concentrates ====
Südzucker has 10 production sites in Austria, China, Denmark, Hungary, Poland, Romania, and Ukraine.

== See also ==
- Agrana
