= Hîrbovăț Monastery =

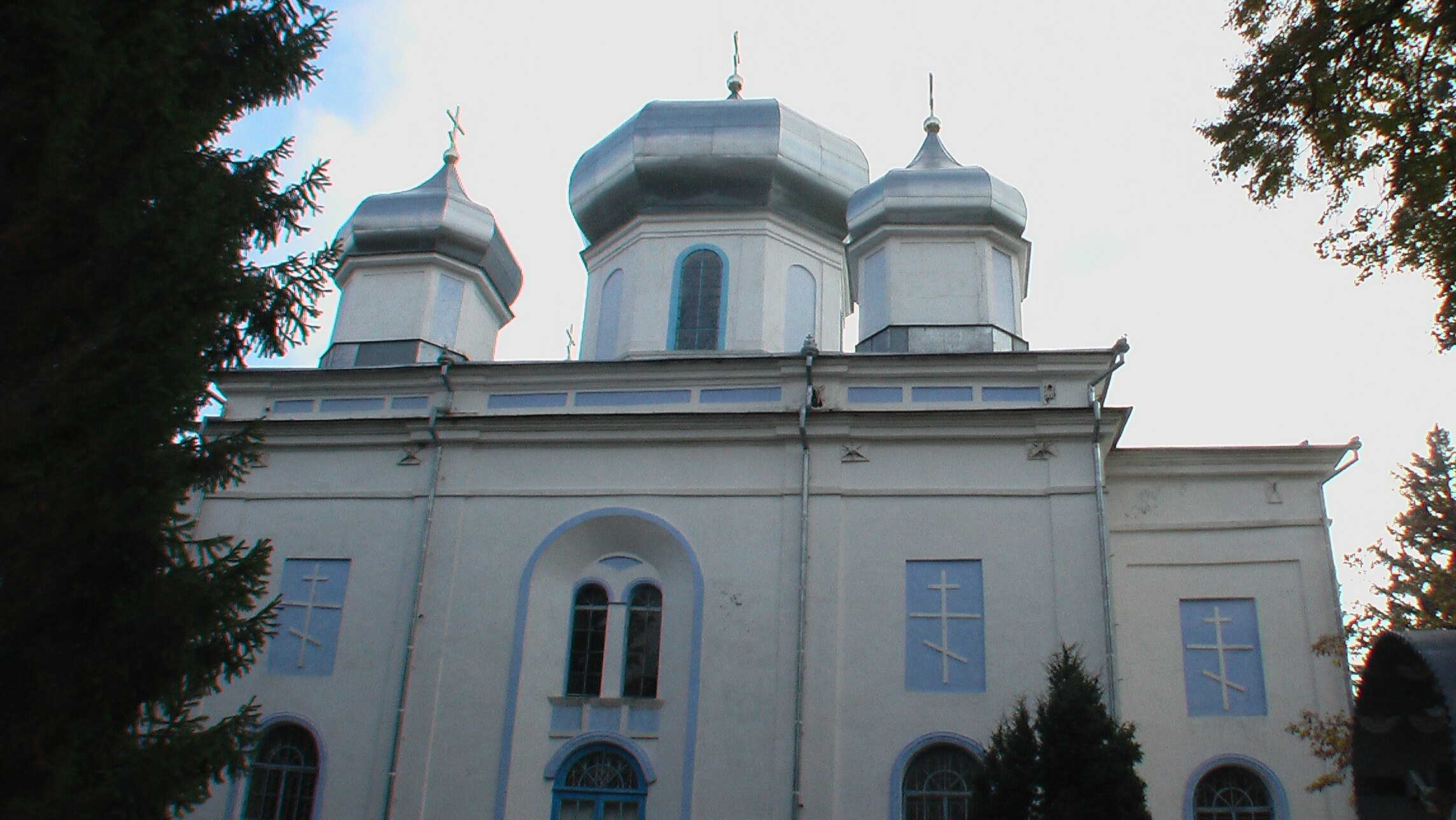
- Hîrbovăț Monastery
- 47°20′01.6″N 28°18′38.7″E
- Location: Hîrbovăț, Călărași District
- Country: Moldova
- Denomination: Eastern Orthodoxy

History
- Status: Monastery
- Founded: 1730

Architecture
- Style: Moldavian

Hîrbovăț Monastery (Romanian: Mănăstirea Hîrbovăț) is a monastery of Moldova, located north of the village of Hîrbovăț, under the jurisdiction of the Diocese of Ungheni and Nisporeni of the Metropolis of Chișinău and All Moldova.

== History ==
Hîrbovăț monastery was founded in 1730 by boyar Constantin Carpuz. In 1790, the community received an icon of the Mother of God from the wife of the Russian general, Nikolai Albaduyev, which was later called Hîrbovăț (after the abolished name of the monastery) and which became the most valuable element of the monastery's equipment. Until 1812, the monastery was destroyed three times by the Ottoman Turks. Then secular Stefan Lupu erected the Church of the Dormition of the Mother of God, and in 1870 monks Nathaniel and Jerome built the second temple of the Descent of the Holy Spirit.

The monastery was open continuously until 1962, when it was closed by the Soviet authorities as one of the last Orthodox monasteries in the Moldavian SSR. As other monasteries in Moldova were liquidated in previous years, monks transferred to it from Căpriana, Țiganesti and other monasteries also lived in the Hîrbovăț monastery at the time of its closure. The furnishings of the monastery were destroyed; liturgical books, icons and the archives kept there were burnt shortly after it was closed. A school for disabled children was established in the monastery, and a school club in the former church. The school management decided to renew the temple only in 1988–1989.

In 1992, the Hîrbovăț monastery was returned to the Orthodox Church. Archimandrite Seraphim stood at the head of the renewed community. In the years 1990–1991, the main Orthodox Church of the Dormition of the Mother of God, re-ordained in 1992, was completed, and in 1993, services were resumed in the smaller temple of the Descent of the Holy Spirit [1]. In the same year, a church psalmist school was opened at the monastery.
