= Sergiu Cioclea =

Moldovan economist (born 1974)

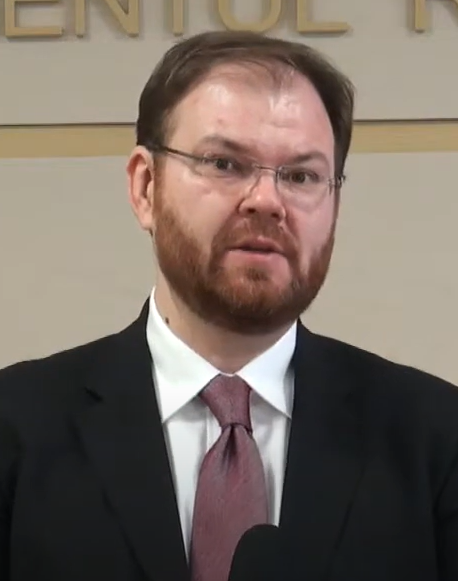
- Cioclea in 2016

Governor of the National Bank of Moldova
- In office 11 April 2016 – 30 November 2018
- Preceded by: Dorin Drăguțanu
- Succeeded by: Octavian Armașu

Personal details
- Born: 12 September 1974 (age 51) Chișinău, Moldavian SSR, Soviet Union
- Education: Academy of Economic Studies of Moldova
- Profession: Economist

Sergiu Cioclea (born 12 September 1974) is an economist from Moldova. He was born in Chişinău and has served as the head of the National Bank of Moldova since April 2016 until November 2018, when was replaced by Octavian Armașu.

Cioclea worked for BNP Paribas (2008–2015).

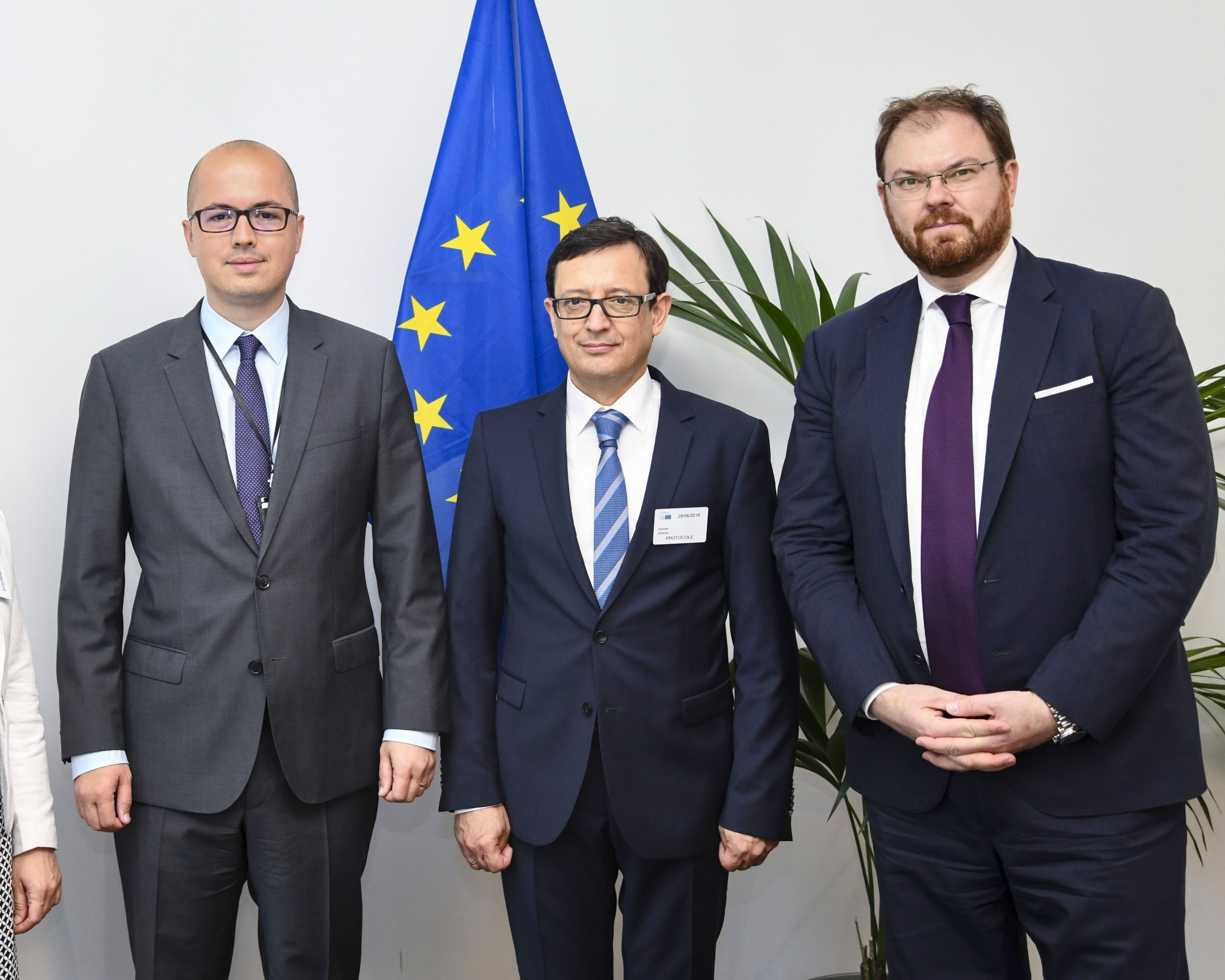
Cioclea with finance minister Octavian Armașu (centre) and Andi Cristea in Brussels on 28 June 2018
