= Dorin Drăguțanu =

Moldovan economist (born 1974)

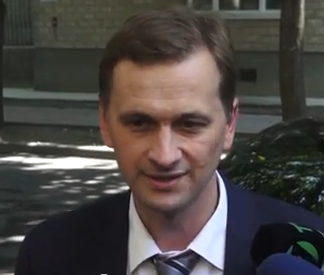
- Drăguțanu in 2015

Governor of the National Bank of Moldova
- In office 6 November 2009 – 11 April 2016
- Preceded by: Leonid Talmaci
- Succeeded by: Sergiu Cioclea

Personal details
- Born: 19 March 1974 (age 52) Chișinău, Moldavian SSR, Soviet Union
- Spouse: Otilia
- Education: Alexandru Ioan Cuza University
- Profession: Economist

Dorin Drăguțanu (born 19 March 1974) is an economist from Moldova. He was born in Chișinău and served as the head of the National Bank of Moldova from November 2009 until April 2016, when he was replaced by Sergiu Cioclea.

In 1996 Dorin Drăguțanu graduated from the Department of Economy (Finance and Banks) of Alexandru Ioan Cuza University. During 1998–2003 he pursued his studies in the authorized centre of the Association of Chartered Certified Accountants in Bucharest. Dorin Drăguţanu worked for PricewaterhouseCoopers (1998–2008).
