= Onișcani =

- Commune
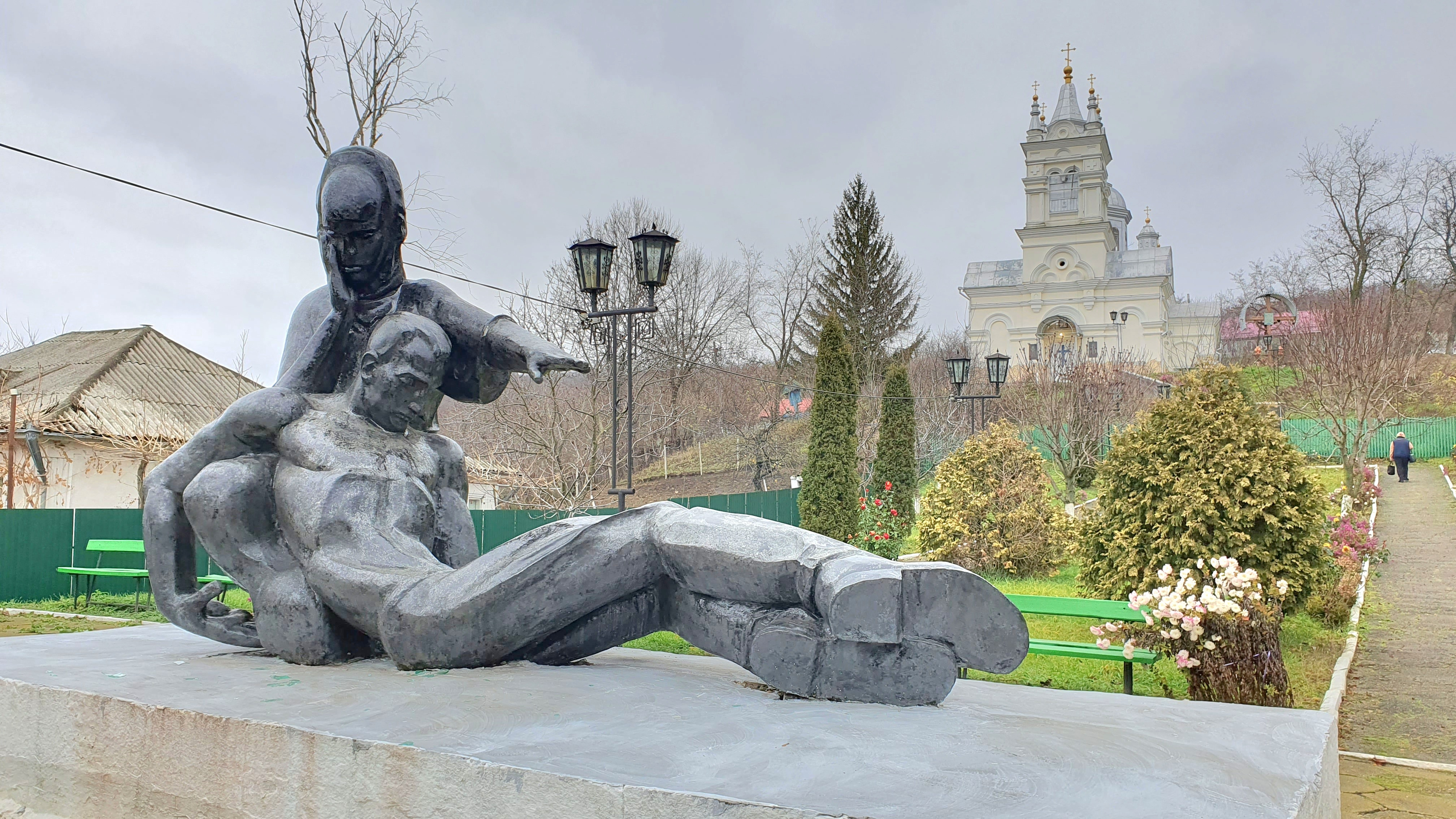

- Location within Moldova
- Coordinates: 47.3716666667°N 28.2811111111°E
- Country: Moldova
- District: Călărași District

Population (2014)
  - Total: 1,799
- Time zone: UTC+2 (EET)
  - Summer (DST): UTC+3 (EEST)

Onișcani is a commune in Călărași District, Moldova. It is composed of three villages: Hîrbovăț, Onișcani and Sverida.

At the 2014 census, the population was 1,799. In 2004, it was divided as follows: 1,334 in Onișcani, 792 in Hîrbovăț and 84 in Sverida.
