= National Bank of Moldova =

Central Bank of Moldova

Coordinates: 47°01′45″N 28°50′17″E

National Bank of Moldova Banca Națională a Moldovei

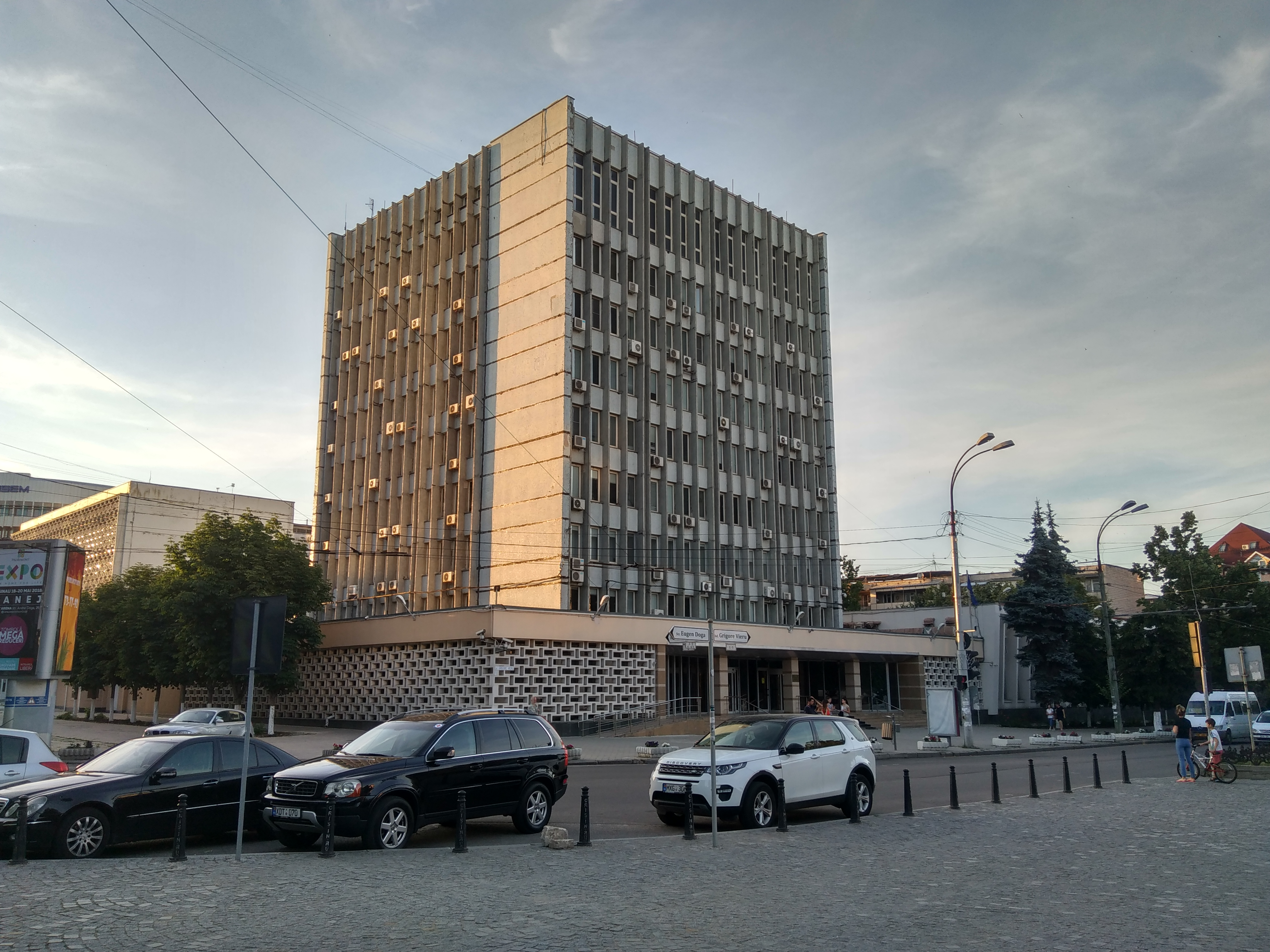
- Headquarters in Chișinău
- Headquarters: 1 Grigore Vieru Boulevard, Chișinău
- Established: 4 June 1991
- Ownership: 100% state ownership
- Governor: Anca Dragu
- Central bank of: Republic of Moldova
- Currency: Moldovan leu MDL (ISO 4217)
- Reserves: 1 740 million USD
- Website: www.bnm.md

The National Bank of Moldova (Romanian: Banca Națională a Moldovei, BNM) is the central bank of the Republic of Moldova.

The National Bank of Moldova is an autonomous public legal entity and is responsible to the Parliament of the Republic of Moldova. The primary objective of the National Bank of Moldova shall be to ensure and maintain the price stability. Without prejudice to its primary objective, the National Bank of Moldova shall promote and maintain a financial system based on market principles and shall support the general economic policy of the state.

The National Bank cooperates with the Government with the view to achieving its objectives and, according to the Law, undertakes the necessary measures to implement such cooperation. The NBM periodically informs the public about macroeconomic analysis, financial market evolution and statistic data, including on money supply, credit granting, balance of payments and foreign exchange market.

== Regulatory Bank ==
As the central bank of Moldova, the bank is the primary regulator in the industry, with the authority to issue and withdraw banking licenses and regulate and supervise the banking sector.

Assistance from the IMF and various changes to banking in Moldova resulted in major improvements in the sector. The IMF reported in 2023 that Banks remain adequately capitalised, maintain adequate liquidity coverage and healthy asset quality.

The National Bank of Moldova as the central bank, also controls interest rates and the exchange rate of the Moldovan leu.

Laws passed by the parliament are supplemented by secondary legislation consisting of regulations and decisions issued by the National Bank of Moldova.

== History ==
Following the passing of legislation in 1991, a two-level banking system was formed with the National Bank of Moldova acting as the central bank and being banned from commercial banking activities. Leonid Talmaci was appointed Governor, he would hold office for 18 years and oversee the 1995 banking legislation that would cover the central bank and banking institutions.

Following the collapse of the Soviet Union and the Moldovan Declaration of Independence in 1991, January 1992 saw Moldova began a market economy, however the freeing of price restraints resulted in rapid inflation and for a number of years the economy was in crisis. The country joined the IMF on 12 August 1992 and on 29 November 1993 a new currency was introduced, the Moldovan leu.

2001 saw an improvement in the economy with steady annual growth for a number of years.

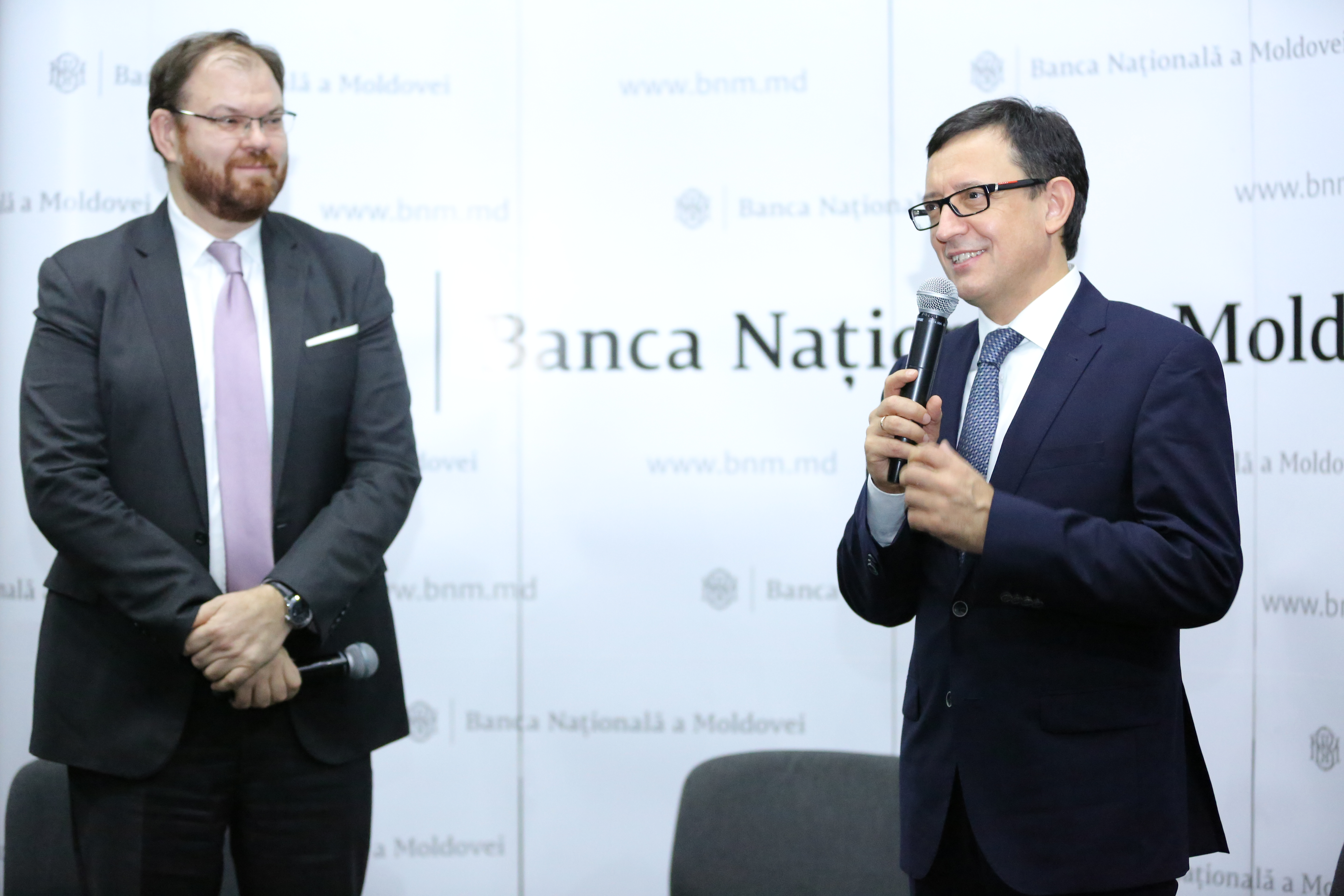
Octavian Armașu (left) taking over the governorship from Sergiu Cioclea (right), 30 November 2018

As a result of a deliberate act, shortly before the 2014 Moldovan parliamentary election, a bank fraud took place involving three banks. Over a three day period, funds worth $1 billion were transferred to United Kingdom and Hong Kong shell companies used to conceal the real owners of assets, then deposited into Latvian bank accounts under the names of various foreigners. An independent investigation appointed by the National Bank of Moldova concluded the three banks transferred at least 13.5 billion lei to five Moldovan companies affiliated with the Shor group, controlled by Ilan Șor. The fraud nearly bankrupted Moldova. On 13 April 2023, a court sentenced Șor to 15 in years in prison in absentia on graft charges and froze all his assets.

In December 2023 the Governor, Octavian Armașu, having been criticised in Parliament for failing to recover stolen financial assets and retaining in office bank employees who were accused in the banking fraud case, was dismissed. In a June 2024 report, the European Commission described Armașu's dismissal as sudden and unexpected, stating that "the procedure by which the former governor was dismissed is a cause for concern and may pose a risk to the independence of the central bank". The dismissal was likewise criticised by the International Monitary Fund (IMF). Armașu was succeeded by Anca Dragu. In November 2024, the Ministry of Finance put forth an amendment to remove Parliament's sole right to dismiss and approve the management of the banking authority.

== Governors ==
№	Name	Photo	Term of office	
№	Name	Photo	Start of term	End of term
1	Leonid Talmaci		4 June 1991	26 September 2009
2	Dorin Drăguțanu		6 November 2009	11 April 2016
3	Sergiu Cioclea		11 April 2016	30 November 2018
4	Octavian Armașu		30 November 2018	21 December 2023
5	Anca Dragu		22 December 2023	incumbent

== See also ==
- Economy of Moldova
- Moldovan leu
- List of central banks
