= Octavian Armașu =

Moldovan banker and economist (born 1969)

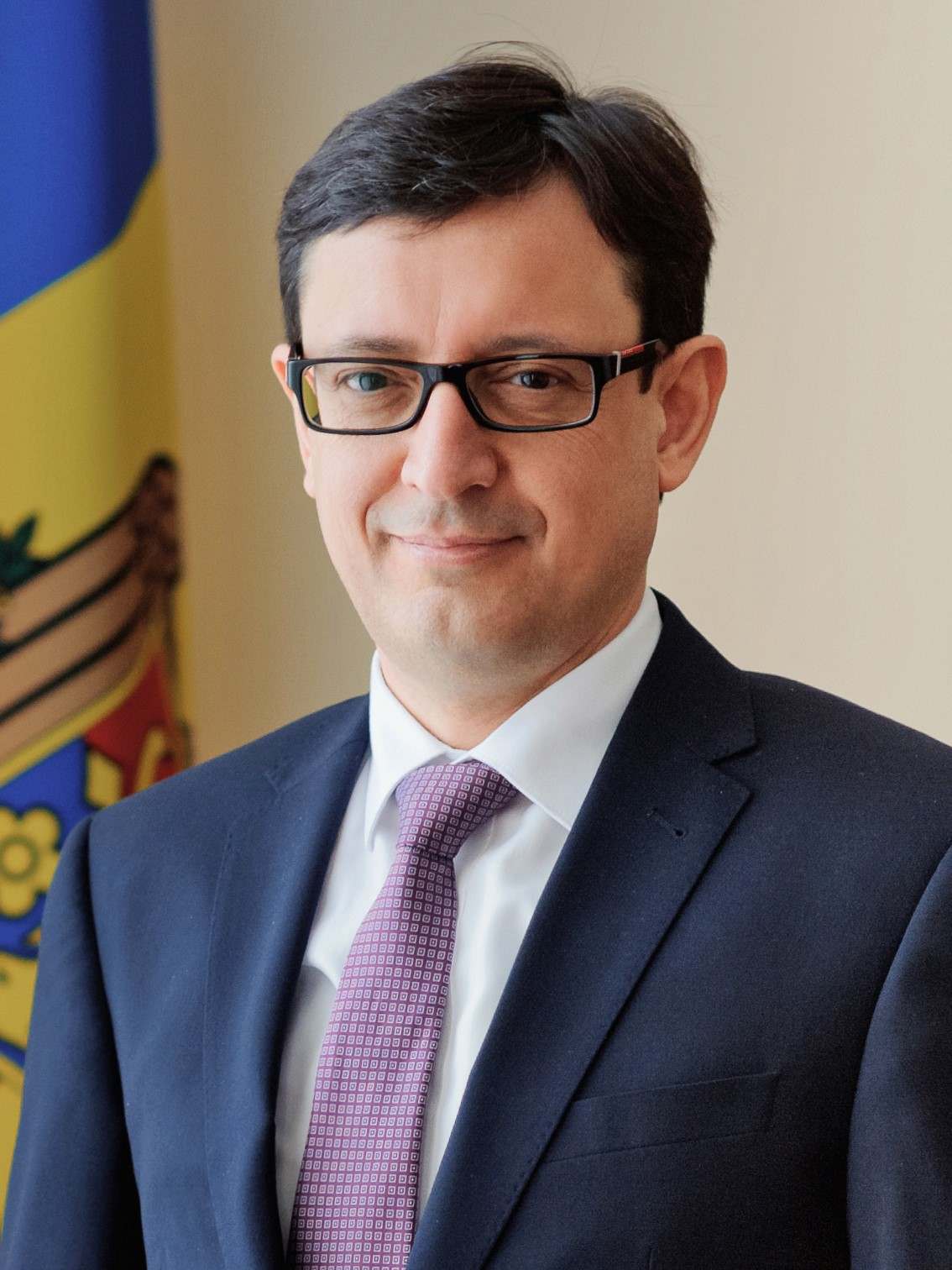
- Official portrait, 2017

Governor of the National Bank of Moldova
- In office 30 November 2018 – 21 December 2023
- Preceded by: Sergiu Cioclea
- Succeeded by: Anca Dragu

Minister of Finance
- In office 20 January 2016 – 30 November 2018
- President: Nicolae Timofti; Igor Dodon
- Prime Minister: Pavel Filip
- Preceded by: Anatol Arapu
- Succeeded by: Ion Chicu

Personal details
- Born: 29 July 1969 (age 57) Chișinău, Moldavian SSR, Soviet Union
- Spouse: Elena Armașu (m. 2016)
- Children: 2
- Education: Technical University of Moldova
- Octavian Armașu's voice Armașu at a press conference in Chișinău; Recorded 14 August 2023

Octavian Armașu (Romanian: [ok-ta-ˈvi-an ar-ˈma-ʃu]; born 29 July 1969) is a Moldovan banker and economist who from 2016 to 2018 served as minister of finance and from 2018 to 2023 as governor of the National Bank of Moldova (NBM). Prior to taking public office, Armașu worked in the private sector, most notably for the German sugar producer Südzucker from 1999 to 2016. Since March 2025, he has served as advisor to the National Bank of Romania (NBR).

== Early life and education ==
Octavian Armașu was born on 29 July 1969 in Chișinău, the capital of the Moldavian Soviet Socialist Republic in the Soviet Union.

From 1991 to 1994 he studied Systems Engineering, specialising in information technology at the Technical University of Moldova in Chișinău. Between 1996 and 1997, he completed courses in financial management, accounting, marketing and management under an USAID-funded project. Between 2002 and 2006, he was enrolled in the Chartered Financial Analyst programme of the CFA Institute in the United States. In addition to his native Romanian, Armașu is fluent in English and Russian.

== Professional career ==
Armașu began his professional career in 1996 as Sales Manager at the Glass Container Company in Chișinău, where he was responsible for cultivating client relationships and driving regional sales growth during the company's post‑Soviet expansion.

In 1997 he joined Onest Business Consulting, a Dutch–Moldovan joint venture, serving as Senior Consultant until 1999. In 1999 Armașu moved into the manufacturing sector with Südzucker, a major German sugar manufacturer, being appointed Controller for its Moldovan branch. After two years overseeing internal financial controls, he was promoted in 2001 to head of controlling department of Südzucker Moldova.

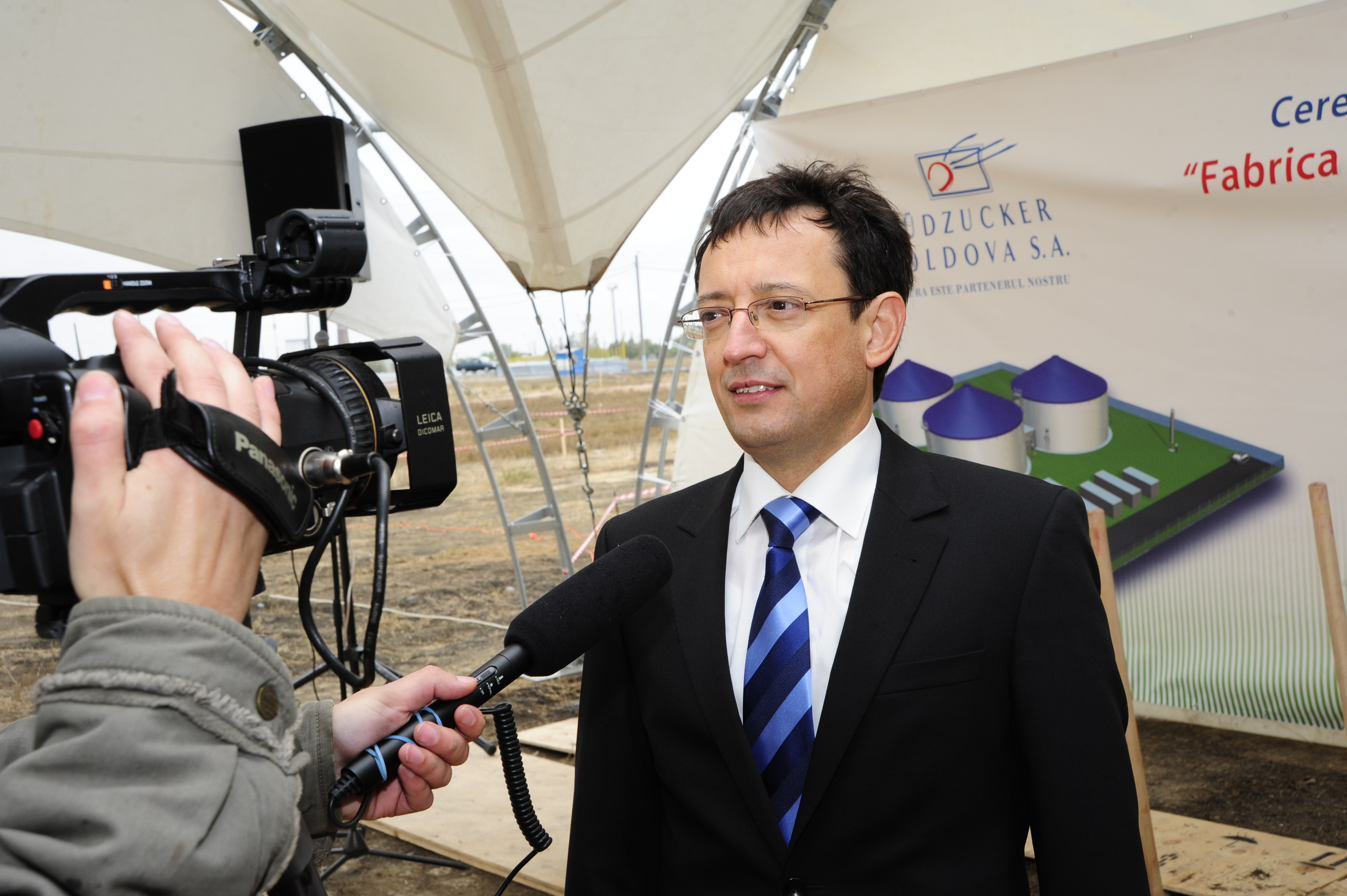
Armașu during the inauguration of a new Südzucker biogas plant in Drochia, 21 September 2012

In April 2014, as the financial director of Südzucker Moldova, Armașu pointed out that, despite a recent increase in price, sugar on the domestic market remained cheaper than the regional average, leading Moldovan producers to expand their exports to Cyprus, Bulgaria, and the Baltic states. In August of that year, following Russia's ban on the import of Moldovan sugar under the free trade regime, Armașu estimated to Adevărul that the decision could amount to commercial losses of about 250 million Moldovan lei (MDL) for the Moldovan sugar industry.

From March 2004 to January 2016, Armașu served as chief financial officer (CFO) and member of the executive board, directing planning, budgeting and financial analysis. He held the CFO post until January 2016 upon being appointed Moldova's finance minister.

== Public offices (2016–2023) ==
=== Finance minister (2016–2018) ===
On 20 January 2016, Armașu took office as finance minister in the government headed by prime minister Pavel Filip, succeeding Anatol Arapu who had held the position since 2013. On 30 September, a protester threw milk from a bucket at Armașu. On 30 November, Armașu signed a memorandum with several NGOs, business associations, and IT companies for the adoption of an electronic public procurement system scheduled for launch on 1 January 2017. In February 2017, Armașu supported the increase in taxes on tobacco, stating that the measure was mainly aimed at improving public health, as well as increasing budget revenues. At the launch of the First House II programme (Prima Casă II) on 16 May 2018, Armașu stated that one of the programme's objectives were to support young people in obtaining housing and continuing their work in the public sector.

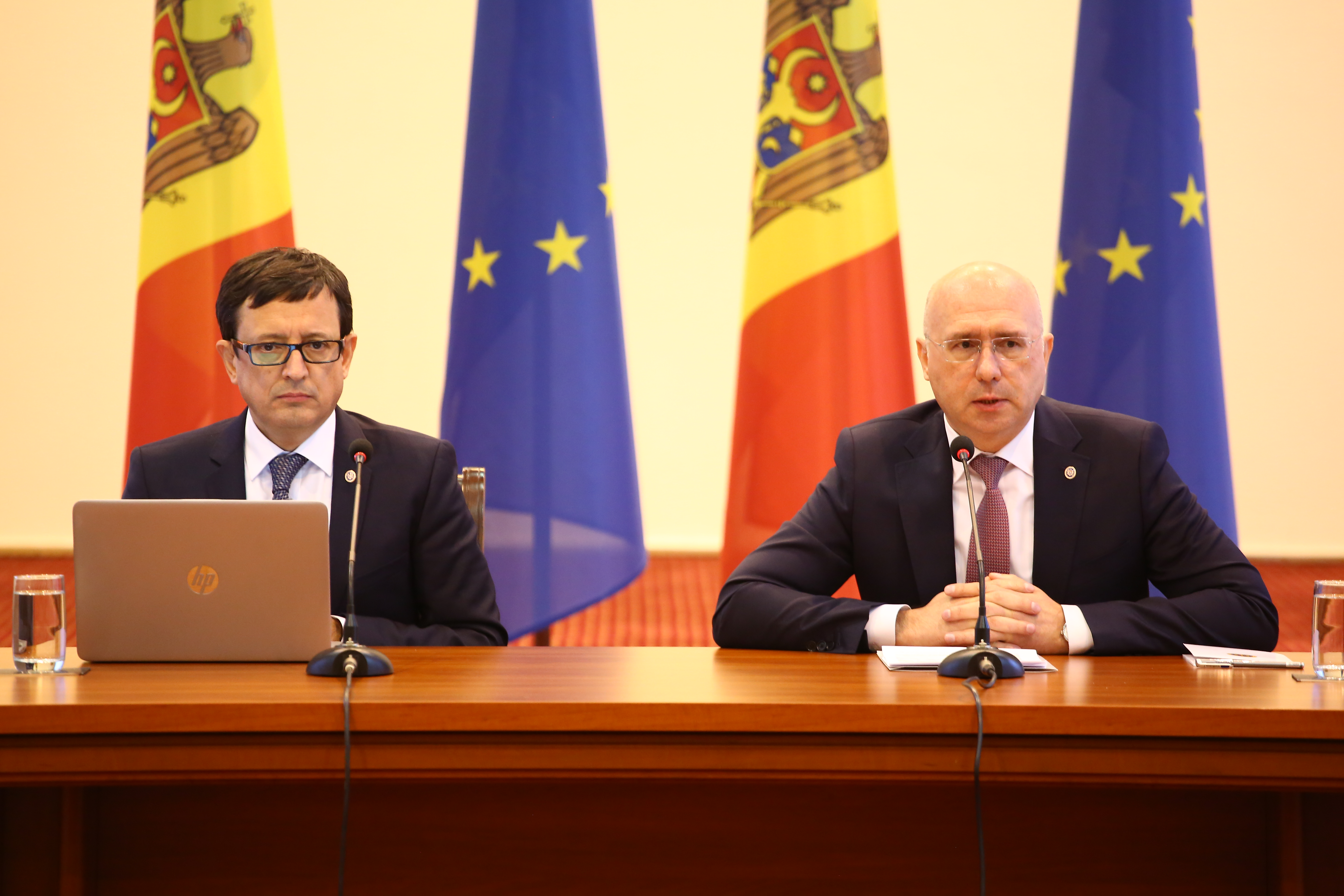
Armașu at press briefing with prime minister Pavel Filip, 24 October 2018

In October 2018, Armașu introduced a unified salary law for the Moldovan public sector, replacing multiple pay regulations with a single wage grid, guaranteeing a minimum monthly salary of 2,000 MDL and raising wages for lower-income categories. He stated that the reform reduced the ratio between the highest and lowest salaries from 33:1 to around 16:1, introduced a coefficient scale ranging from 1 to 15 with fixed and variable components, and increased the total wage fund by 1.3 billion MDL to ensure full coverage. Commenting on Armașu's tenure as finance minister, Sergiu Cioclea, NBM governor from 2016 to 2018 and Armașu's predecessor, stated in a 2019 interview that "The NBM and the Ministry of Finance, led at the time by Octavian Armașu, played a pivotal role in securing the IMF programme".

=== Governorship (2018–2023) ===
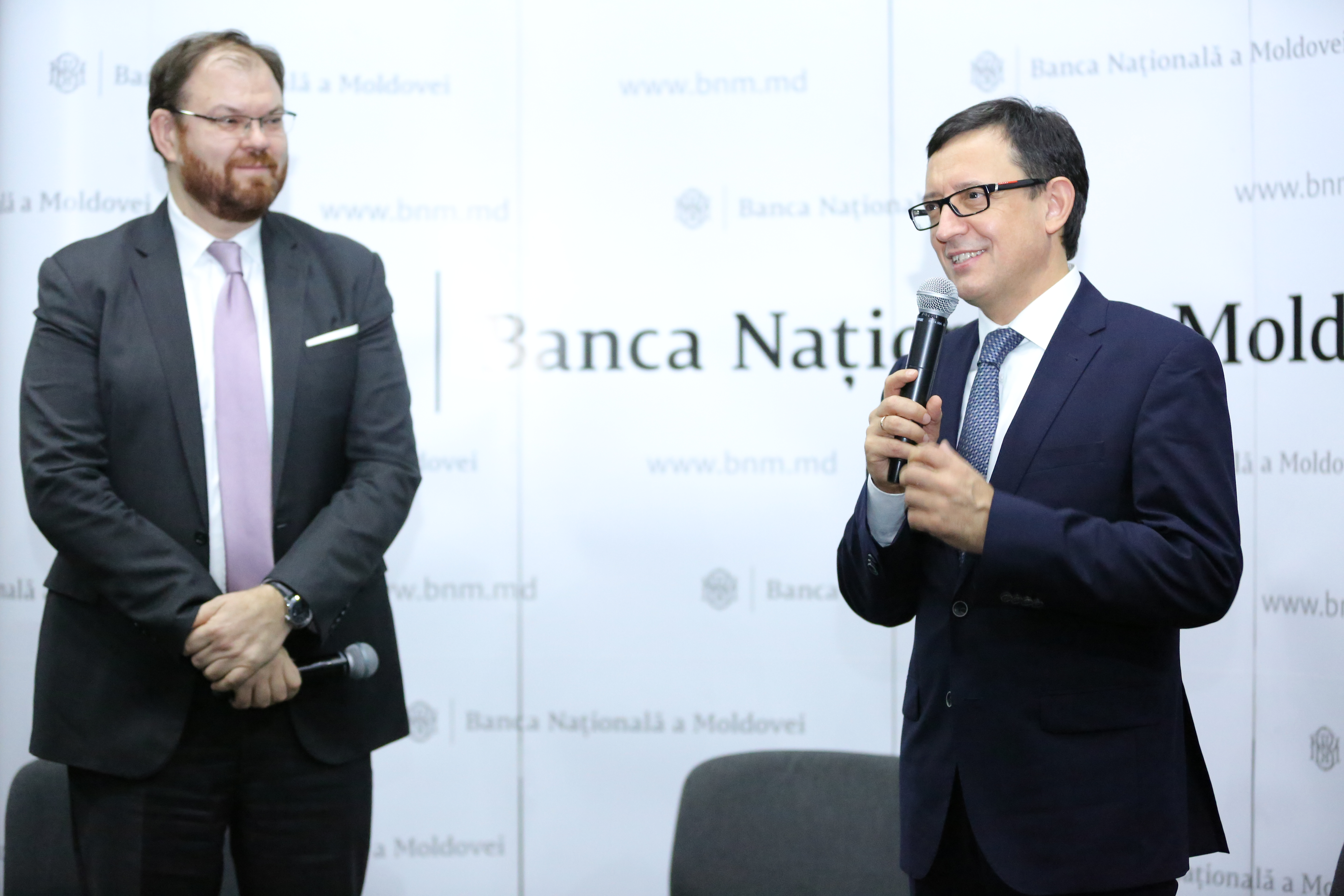
Armașu being presented as new governor with Sergiu Cioclea looking on, 30 November 2018

On 29 November 2018, Armașu was appointed governor of the National Bank of Moldova (NBM) for a seven-year term on the proposal of parliament president Andrian Candu, assuming office on the following day. His nomination was approved by parliament with 54 out of 101 votes in favour. Speaking to Ziarul de Gardă, Raisa Apolschi stated that Armașu had met all the conditions for governor, including work experience in the financial and banking field. Upon taking office, Armașu stated that his term would be characterised by "continuity", praising the reforms of his predecessor, Sergiu Cioclea. On 11 January 2019, the NBM ordered large shareholder blocks in two commercial banks to sell their shares and suspended some of their rights in an effort to "clean up" the banking sector. Asked by media in May of that year, Armașu stated that acceptance of the Moldovan leu in Transnistria was a prerequisite for the region's integration into Moldova's banking system. In December 2020, Armașu criticised the repeal of the so-called "billion law", stating:

Execution of the state guarantee and the prevention of the central bank's decapitalisation through the issuance of government securities was done to maintain the financial stability of the Republic of Moldova and was a safeguard element for the financial-banking system required by the International Monetary Fund

— Octavian Armașu, 18 December 2020

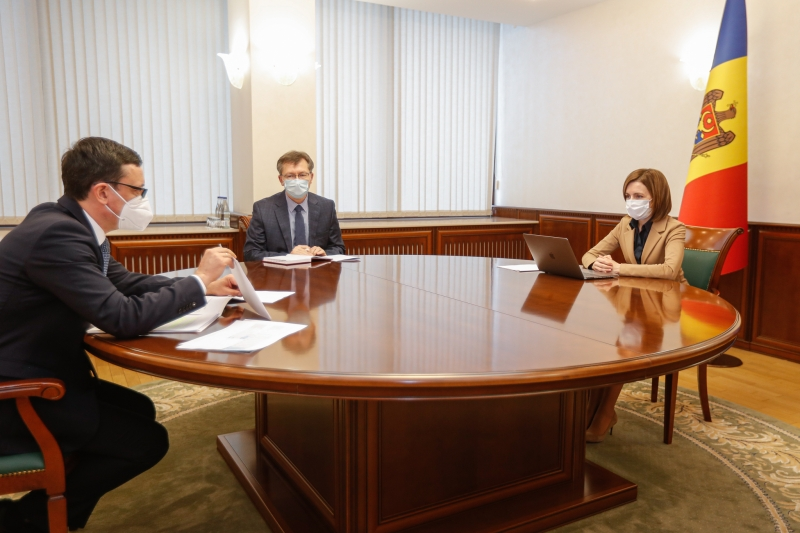
Armașu presenting economic data to Moldovan president Maia Sandu, 23 March 2021

In March 2021, Armașu opposed PSRM leader and former president Igor Dodon's proposal to use Moldova's foreign currency reserves amid the COVID-19 pandemic, calling it unlawful. On 11 June 2021, Armașu and Mugur Isărescu, governor of the National Bank of Romania, renewed the cooperation agreement between the two central banks, expanding collaboration in institutional capacity building, supervision, crisis management, payment service providers and e-money issuers, and financial market infrastructure.

In January 2022, the IMF stated that measures taken by the authorities between 2016 and 2020 under the ECF/EFF arrangements had "supported the rehabilitation of the banking sector and restored macrofinancial stability" following the 2014 Moldovan bank fraud scandal. In February, Armașu presented the NBM's economic forecast that annual inflation would exceed 20% in the second and third quarters. In June, he stated that the NBM would use "all monetary policy instruments" to bring inflation down to 5% in the medium term. With his term being largely defined by the COVID-19 pandemic and the Russian invasion of Ukraine, Armașu announced on 5 December 2022 the start monetary policy easing, as inflation was stable following the previous tightening of monetary policy. Thus, the base rate was from that point gradually reduced from 21.5 to 6 per cent by June 2023. On 15 November, Armașu announced that inflation due to the NBM's measures had returned to the variability corridor of 3.5–6.5 per cent, stating "Pro-inflationary factors will be weaker in the foreseeable event horizon, and our task for the time being is to pursue a monetary policy that stimulates aggregate demand". In addition, the annual rate for 2024 was lowered from 5.1 to 4.5 per cent.

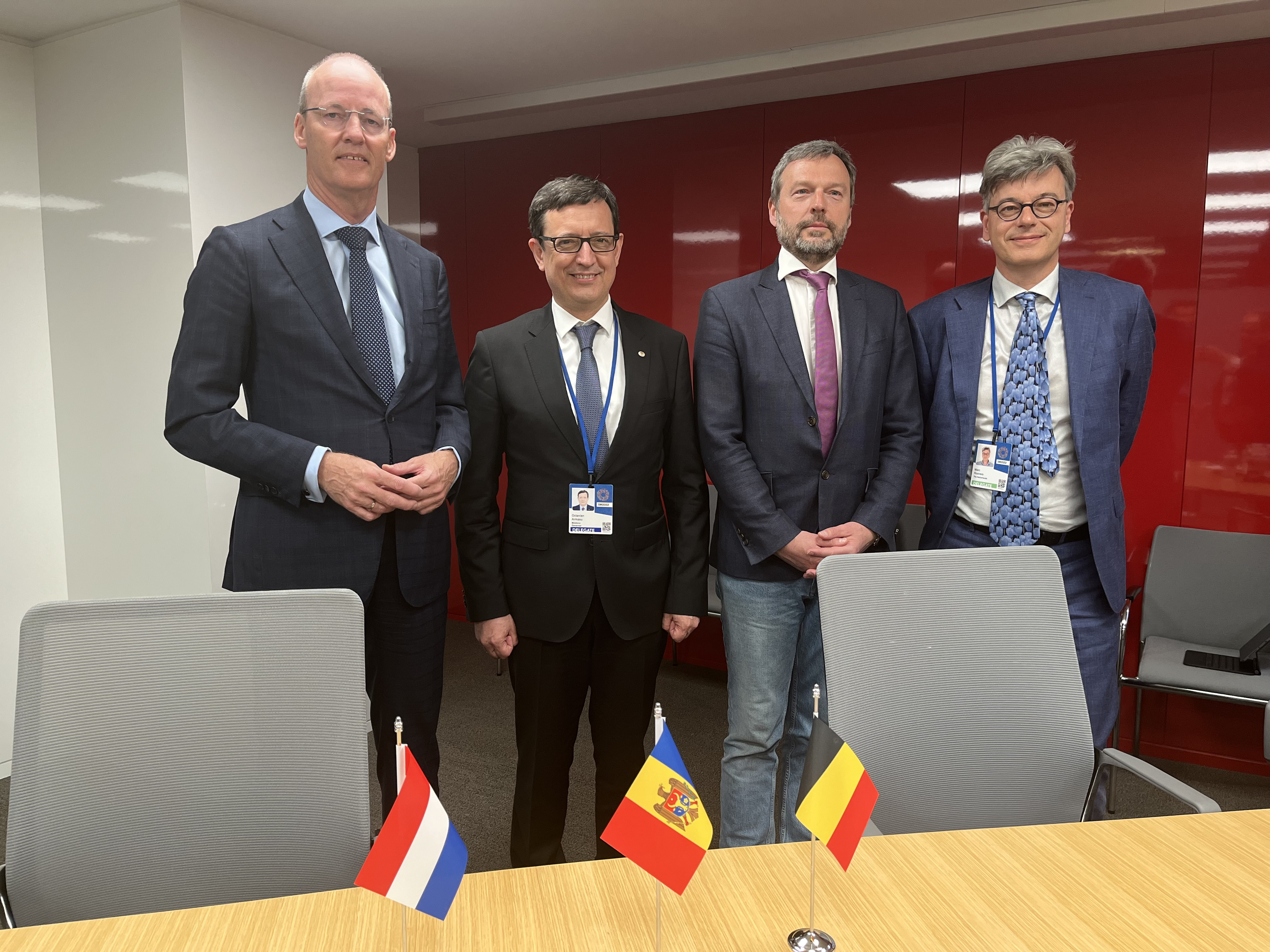
Armașu with Klaas Knot, Pierre Wunsch and Marc Roovers in Washington D.C., 23 April 2022

With his term set to expire in November 2025, the Moldovan parliament, on 21 December 2023, voted 81 to 101 in favour of dismissing Armașu. The PSRM joined incumbent president Maia Sandu's pro-European Action and Solidarity Party to secure the required two-thirds majority. Armașu dismissed the accusations brought against him, arguing that he had not had the "leverage to suspend the activity of the individuals in question". He was succeeded by Anca Dragu, a Romanian politician.

In its June 2024 EU enlargement report, the European Commission described the dismissal as "sudden and unexpected" and expressed concern that the procedure, fell short of international best practices, underscoring potential risks to good governance and central bank independence. The decision was also scrutinised by the IMF, referring to it as abrupt and course for concern over the political independence of the NBM. The dismissal came after a failed attempt by the PSRM to dismiss Armașu in April 2022, and as finance minister in June 2016. Due to his dismissal, the Ministry of Finance in November 2024 put forth an amendment to remove Parliament's sole right to dismiss and approve the management of the banking authority.

== Later career (2023–present) ==
In March 2025, Armașu was appointed to an advisory position at the National Bank of Romania.

== Personal life ==
As of October 2016, Armașu was married to Elena Armașu and the couple has two daughters. Elena worked as of 2018 as a representative in Moldova of the German pharmaceutical company Bayer.
