= Budjak (disambiguation) =

Budjak is a geographic and historical region in Ukraine and Moldova, also referred to as many other names.

Budjak, Budzhak, Budzhakh, Bugeac or Bucaq may also refer to:

- Budjak Tatars, a Turkic ethnic group that inhabited Budjak
  - Budjak Horde, a former autonomous formation of Budjak Tatars under the influence of the Ottoman Empire
- Budzhak, Ukraine, a rural settlement in Ukraine
- Bucaq (also Budzhakh), a village in Azerbaijan
- Yuxarı Buçaq (also Budzhak), a village in Azerbaijan
- Bugeac, Gagauzia, a village in Moldova
- Bugeac Steppe, a steppe in Moldova and Ukraine
- Lake Bugeac, a lake in Romania

== See also ==
- Bucak (disambiguation)
- Bucaq, Yevlakh (disambiguation)
- Bujak (disambiguation)
- Sibat, a Filipino spear, also known as budjak, bodjak and budiak among Muslim Filipinos
