= Bucaq, Yevlakh =

Bucaq, Yevlakh (also, Budzhak, Yevlakh) may refer to:

- Aşağı Bucaq, Azerbaijan
- Yuxarı Bucaq, Azerbaijan

== See also ==
- Budjak (disambiguation)
- Bucak (disambiguation)
- Bujak (disambiguation)
