= Bujak =

Bujak may refer to:

- Bujak (surname)
- Buják, a village and municipality in Hungary
- Bujak, Masovian Voivodeship, a village in Poland

== See also ==
- Bucak (disambiguation)
- Bucaq, Yevlakh (disambiguation)
- Budjak (disambiguation)
