= Eliezer Shulman =

Eliezer Shulman (Hebrew אליעזר שולמן; July 11, 1923, Tarutino, Bessarabia, Romania – January 3, 2006 [3 Tevet 5766], Bat Yam, Israel) was a biblical scholar and historian. He wrote in Hebrew.

Shulman was born in the German-Jewish town Tarutino, Romania (now Bessarabske, Bolhrad Raion of Odesa region, Ukraine) in 1923, son of a merchant of agricultural and building supplies. He studied at a Jewish school, joined Zionist youth movement Betar, and planned to immigrate to Palestine with the underground movement Aliyah Af Al Pi. However, in the summer of 1940, as the result of the Molotov–Ribbentrop Pact, the Soviet Union occupied and annexed Bessarabia from Romania. On June 13, 1941, the Shulman family was deported to Kazakhstan. There Eliezer worked as a laborer, a blacksmith, and, finally, a tractor driver. In 1946, he graduated from a college for railway technicians in Aktyubinsk (now Aktobe), Kazakhstan, and was transferred to Stalinsk (now Novokuznetsk), Siberia to work on railroads construction. He worked as a construction supervisor, technician, engineer, and eventually became the chief engineer of the transportation division within a mining industry design institute.

In 1948 he married a Soviet medical doctor, Sarah Finestein. They had two daughters, whom Eliezer gave biblical names, taught Hebrew, TaNaKh (Hebrew Bible) and Jewish history. Throughout his 33 years in Kazakhstan and Siberia, he did not give up his dream of living in Israel. Eliezer and his daughters translated Israeli songs into Russian. Eliezer began making chronological graphs of biblical events to aid in his teaching TaNaKh.

In 1975, the family was finally able to reach Israel. There Eliezer worked for the Israel Railways. After his retirement in 1988, he worked as a consultant to the Director General of the Israel Railways until 1993. Meanwhile, he continued to work on biblical research and analysis, frequently visiting Tel-Aviv library.

In 1981, Shulman's first book - Seder ha-korot ba-Chumash (The Sequence of Events in the Pentateuch) – was published by the Israeli Ministry of Defense Publishing House. His second book - Seder Ha'korot be'TaNaKh (The Sequence of Events in the Old Testament) was published in 1984. This book was translated into English, Spanish and Russian. Eliezer Shulman continued research, concentrating on certain biblical narratives, working through the individual books of Talmud, Rashi commentaries, works of Josephus Flavius, publishing 12 books. His last book - "Semites, Jews, Israelites, Jews" - was published posthumously.

== Bibliography ==
- Seder ha-korot ba-Chumash (The Sequence of Events in the Pentateuch). Hebrew. Tel-Aviv: Israeli Ministry of Defense Publishing House, 1981.
- Seder ha-korot ba-TaNaKh (The Sequence of Events in the Old Testament). Hebrew. Tel-Aviv: Israeli Ministry of Defense Publishing House, 1984 (Six editions in Hebrew between 2000 and 2005).
- “Последовательность Cобытий в Библии” (genealogical charts, graphs and maps). Russian translation, Jerusalem, 1986. Reprinted in Tel Aviv by the Israeli Ministry of Defense Publishing House, 1990.
- Mistorey Amalek (Mysteries of Amalek), 1986.
- The Sequence of Events in the Old Testament. Genealogical charts, graphs and maps. English translation. Lynbrook, NY, Gefen Books, 1987. Reprinted by Gefen Books, 1990 and 1994; by Lambda Publishers, Inc. Brooklyn, NY, 2003.
- Secuencia de los acontecimientos en la Biblia. Spanish translation. Tel-Aviv: Israeli Ministry of Defense Publishing House, 1989.
- Haggadat Esther - Galut Bavel ve'Shivat Tzion (Story of Esther – Babylonian Exile and Return to Zion). Hebrew. Tel-Aviv: Israeli Ministry of Defense Publishing House, 1990. Reprinted in 2000.
- Kadmonyot Josephus Flavius keneged ha'TaNaKh (Antiquities by Flavius Josephus vs. the TaNaKh), Hebrew. 1995.
- Seder ha-korot ba-Talmud (The Sequence of Events in Talmud — Tractate Megillah), Hebrew. 1998.
- Seder Olam Rabba l'hitna Rabbi Josie bar Halafta (Biblical Chronology – Seder Olam Rabba – according to Rabbi Yose bar Halafta). Hebrew. Jerusalem, Mofet, 1999.
- Seder Shmitot ve-Yovlot (The Sequence of Land Sabbath and Jubilee Years), 2000.
- Seder ha-korot ba-TaNaKh lefi Rashi (The Sequence of Events in TaNaKh according to Rashi), Hebrew. 2001.
- Seder ha-korot ba-Talmud (The Sequence of events in the Talmud), Hebrew. 2003.
- Ein mukdam u-meuhar ba-TaNaKh (No Concept of "earlier" and "later" in TaNaKh), Hebrew. 2005.
- HaShemim, HaHivrim, Benei Israel ve-Hay-Yehudim (Semites, Hebrews, Israelites and Jews), Hebrew. 2008.
