= Tarutyne Raion =

Former subdivision of Odesa Oblast, Ukraine

Tarutyne Raion Тарутинський район
- Raion
- Flag Coat of arms

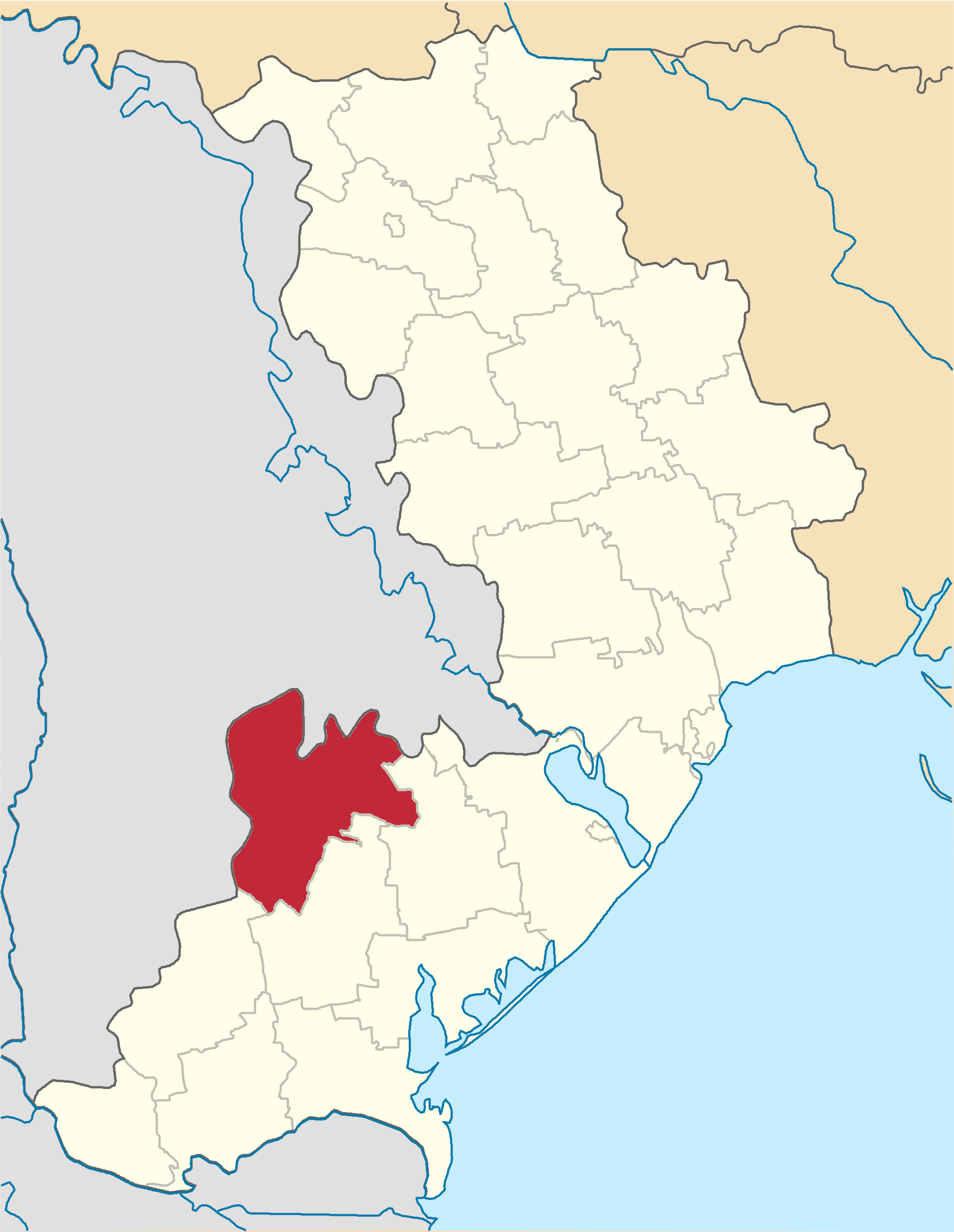
- Coordinates: 46°16′5″N 29°12′50″E
- Country: Ukraine
- Oblast: Odesa Oblast
- Established: 1957
- Disestablished: 18 July 2020
- Admin. center: Tarutyne
- Subdivisions: List: 0 — city councils; 4 — settlement councils; 23 — rural councils; Number of localities: 0 — cities; 4 — urban-type settlements; 47 — villages; 0 — rural settlements

Government
  - Governor: Viktor Matchin

Area
  - Total: 1,874 km^{2} (724 sq mi)

Population (2020)
  - Total: 40,054 ▼
  - Density: 21.37/km^{2} (55.36/sq mi)
- Time zone: UTC+02:00 (EET)
  - Summer (DST): UTC+03:00 (EEST)
- Postal index: 68500—68558
- Area code: +380 4847
- Website: http://tarutino-rda.odessa.gov.ua

Tarutyne Raion (Ukrainian: Тарутинський район, Tarutyns'kyj rajon) was a raion (administrative division) in Odesa Oblast in southwestern Ukraine. It was in the historical region of Budjak in southern Bessarabia and its administrative seat was Tarutyne. The raion was abolished on 18 July 2020 as part of the administrative reform of Ukraine, which reduced the number of raions of Odesa Oblast to seven. The area of Tarutyne Raion was merged into Bolhrad Raion. The last estimate of the raion population was 40,054 (2020 est.).

In the 2001 Ukrainian Census, the raion had a multi-ethnic population of 45,169 of which 38% were Bessarabian Bulgarians, 25% Ukrainians, 17% Moldovans, 14% Russians, and 6% Gagauz people. According to the 2001 census, the population was composed of speakers of Russian (32.93%), Bulgarian (31.67%), Ukrainian (18.79%), Romanian (12.69% ) and Gagauz (3.3%). The area was formerly home to a number of Bessarabia Germans, which could have once made up a majority in the surrounding areas.

== Administrative divisions ==
At the time of disestablishment, the raion consisted of two hromadas:

- Borodino settlement hromada with the administration in the urban-type settlement of Borodino;
- Tarutyne settlement hromada with the administration in Tarutyne.

== Nature conservation ==
There were several protected areas located in Tarutyne Raion:

- Staryi Manzyr botanical preserve
- Dibrova Mohylevska landscape preserve
- Tarutyne steppe landscape preserve
