= Bucak =

Bucak (pronounced 'budjak') is a Turkish word meaning "corner", and in the administrative sense, a subdistrict. Its variants are also names for various localities in Asia and Europe.

- Bucak (administrative unit), subdistricts of Turkey, also known as nahiyes
- Bucak, Burdur, a town and district of Burdur Province, Turkey
- Bucak, Çivril
- Budjak, a region in Southern Bessarabia
- Sedat Bucak (born 1960), Turkish chieftain and politician

== See also ==
- Budjak (disambiguation)
- Bujak (disambiguation)
- Bucaq, Yevlakh (disambiguation)
