= Deutsche Zeitung Bessarabiens =

- Owner: Karl Liebram
- Founder: Karl Liebram
- Founded: 6 November 1919
- Ceased publication: 1940
- Language: German
- Headquarters: Tarutino (now Bessarabske)

The Deutsche Zeitung Bessarabiens (German Newspaper of Bessarabia) was a German-language newspaper in Bessarabia (today: Ukraine), founded in 1919.
