= Vesela Dolyna, Odesa Oblast =

Village in Odesa Oblast, Ukraine

Vesela Dolyna Весела Долина
- Village
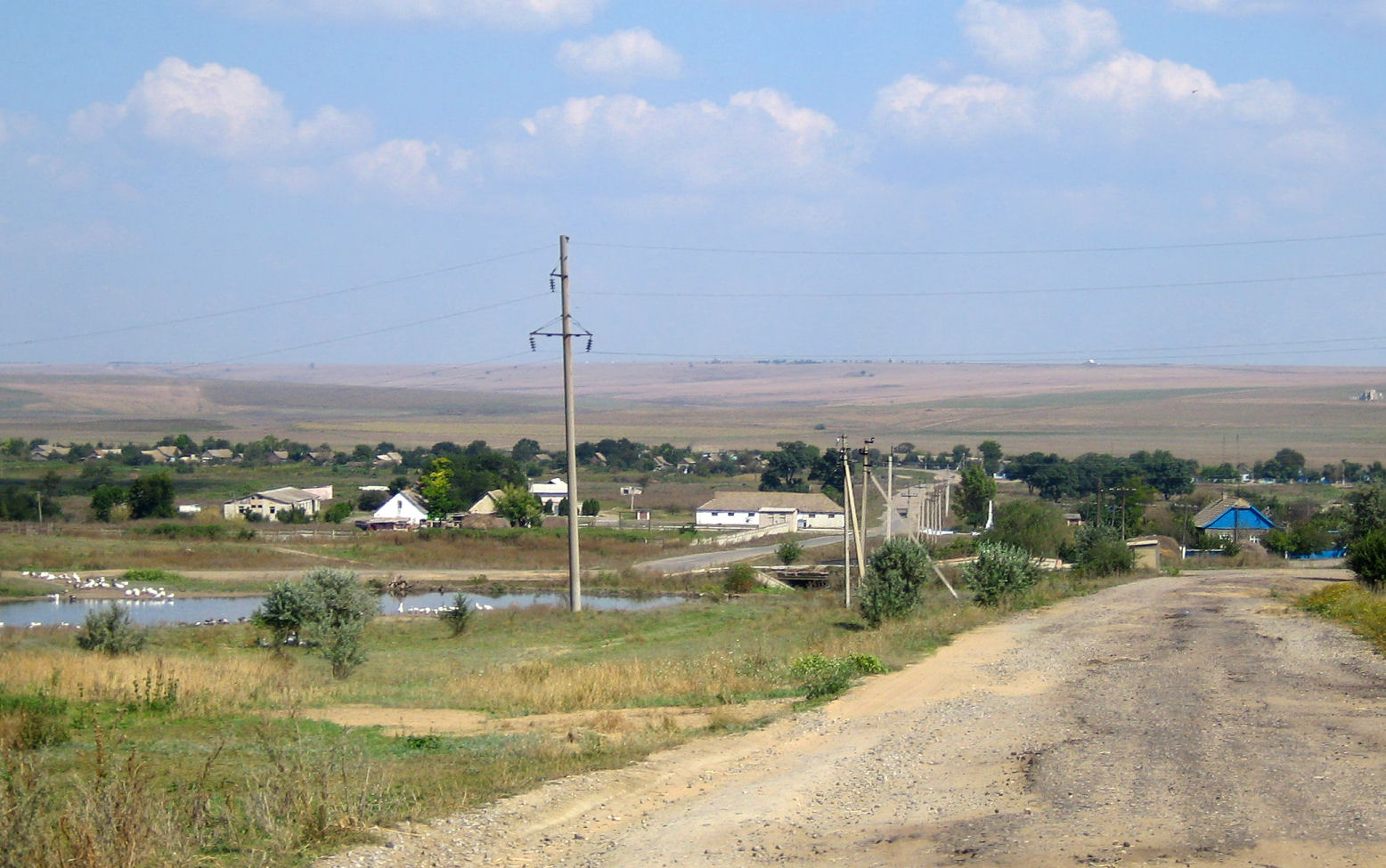

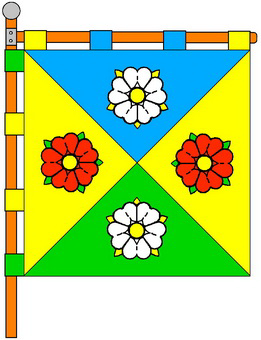
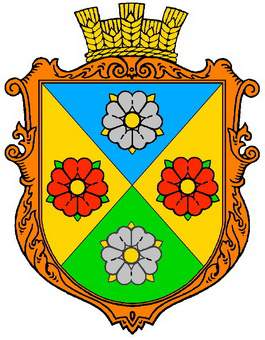
- Flag Coat of arms
- Interactive map of Vesela Dolyna
- Location of Vesela Dolyna Vesela Dolyna (Ukraine)
- Coordinates: 46°14′11″N 29°19′07″E
- Country: Ukraine
- Oblast: Odesa Oblast
- Raion: Bolhrad Raion
- Hromada: Borodino settlement hromada
- Elevation: 36 m (118 ft)

Population (2001)
  - Total: 1,206
- Postal code: 68544
- Area code: +380 4847
- Climate: Cfa

Vesela Dolyna (Ukrainian: Весела Долина; Romanian: Cleaștița or Cleaștiț; German: Klöstitz) is a village in Bolhrad Raion, Odesa Oblast (province) of Ukraine. It belongs to the Borodino settlement hromada, one of the hromadas of Ukraine.

Before 1940, the village was a settlement of Bessarabia Germans.

Until 18 July 2020, Vesela Dolyna was located in Tarutyne Raion. The raion was abolished in July 2020 as part of the administrative reform of Ukraine, which reduced the number of raions in Odesa Oblast to seven. The area of Tarutyne Raion was merged into Bolhrad Raion.

According to the 2001 census, the majority of the population of the commune was Russian speaking (87.56%), with Ukrainian (6.38%), Bulgarian (3.23%) and Romanian (2.57%) speaking in the minority.

== Notable people ==
- Stepan Poltorak (born 1965), general, Minister of Defense (2014–2019)
