= Bessarabia Germans =

Ethnic group who lived in Bessarabia between 1814 and 1940

German: Bessarabiendeutsche
- The coat of arms of the Bessarabia Germans

Regions with significant populations
- Bessarabia in the past (mostly with a significant bygone presence in the Budjak or southern Bessarabia)

Languages
- German (with a series of German dialects as well)

Religion
- Roman Catholicism and Lutheranism

Related ethnic groups
- Germans and Austrians
- Lived in Bessarabia between the early 19th century and mid 20th century

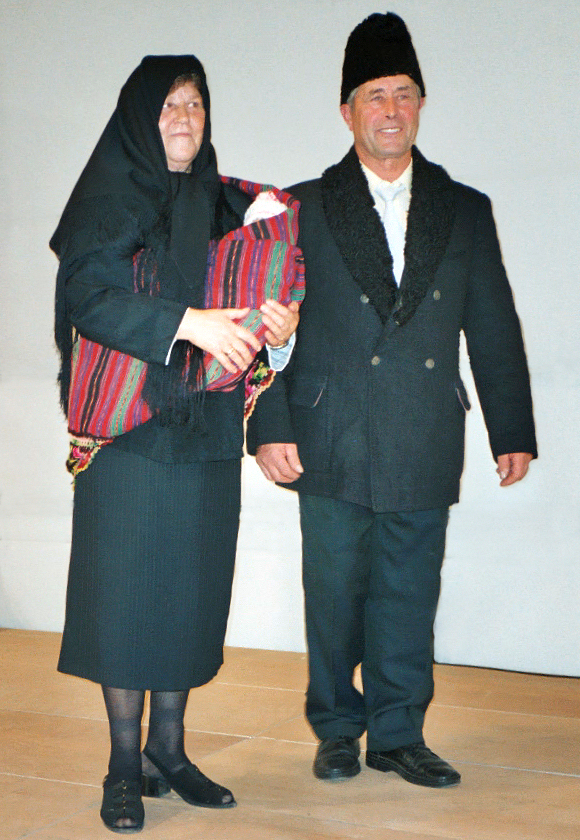
Couple with infant

The Bessarabia Germans (German: Bessarabiendeutsche; Romanian: Germani basarabeni; Ukrainian: Бессарабські німці, romanized: Bessarabs'ki nimtsi) were a German ethnic group (formerly part of the Germans of Romania) who lived in Bessarabia (today part of the Republic of Moldova and south-western Ukraine) between 1814 and 1940.

From 1814 to 1842, 9,000 of them migrated from the German areas of Baden, Württemberg, Bavaria, some Prussian areas of modern-day Poland and Alsace, France, to the Russian governorate of Bessarabia on the Black Sea. The area, was part of the Russian Empire, with the name of Novorossiya; it later became the Bessarabia Governorate.

Throughout their 125-year history, the Bessarabia Germans were an overwhelmingly rural population. Until their remigration to Greater Germany (resulting from the Molotov–Ribbentrop Pact), they were a minority consisting of 93,000 people who made up some 3% of the population. They are distinguished from the Black Sea Germans who settled to the east of Odessa, and from the Dobrujan Germans in Dobruja.

Perhaps the most prominent person of Bessarabian German ancestry is former German President Horst Köhler (elected on behalf of the CDU). Before emigrating in 1940, his parents lived in the German colony of Rîșcani in northern Bessarabia; later they were moved to Poland, which was by that time occupied by Nazi Germany, where Köhler was born.

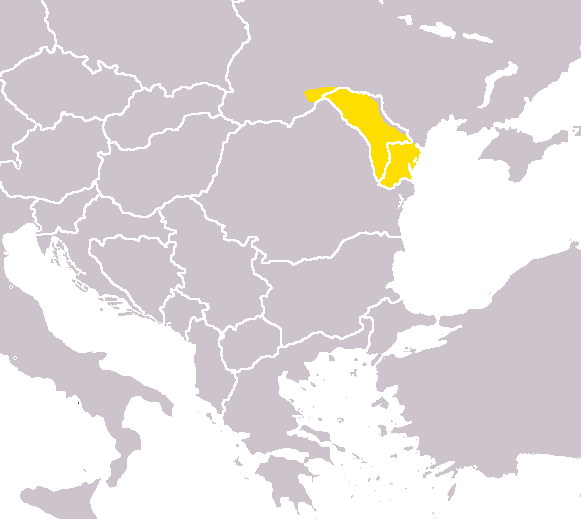
Historical location of Bessarabia in Eastern Europe

== Coat of arms ==
The coat of arms of the Bessarabia Germans (created after the Second World War) symbolises the homeland at the Black Sea, left at 1940. The coat of arms consists of a shield as the main component of the heraldic emblem. On four divisions, the crest symbolises the country's colours and other properties.

- Azure symbolises the blue sky over the steppe;
- Or stands for the golden fields;
- Gules is taken out of the Romanian flag – the state whose citizens the Bessarabia Germans were;
- The well symbolises the importance of water;
- The cross is a symbol for the Church and religion;
- The horse symbolises the dearest friend of the farmer.

== Anthem ==
The Bessarabian anthem Bessarabisches Heimatlied was created in 1922 by Albert Mauch, the director of the Werner-Seminar, a German university in Sarata.

== Origins ==
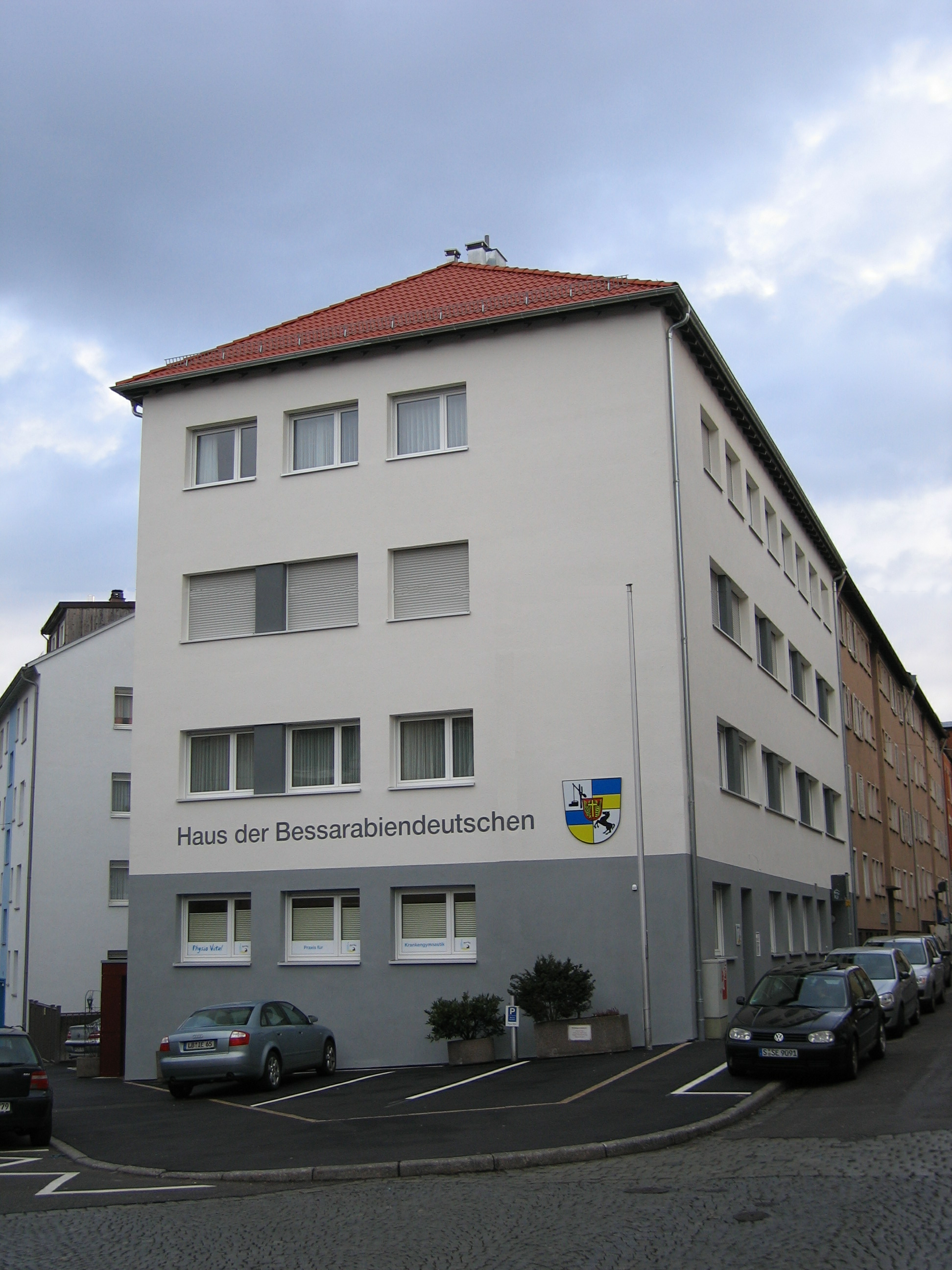
The building of the 'House of the Bessarabia Germans', the homeland museum of the Bessarabia and Dobrujan Germans located in Stuttgart, Germany

The eastern part of the Principality of Moldavia was conquered by the troops of the Russian Czar Alexander I in the Russo-Turkish War between 1806 and 1812. In this Moldavian region, he established the Bessarabia Governorate, the smallest of the Russian Empire. The capital was the central Bessarabian Chişinău.

Nomadic Tatars from the southern region of Bessarabia, Budjak, were banished or emigrated voluntarily after the Russian conquest, leaving the area almost deserted. Russia tried to entice foreign settlers to populate the area and work the farms, since her own farmers were mainly serfs. The aim of this was to re-establish agriculture on the rich black soil. Tsar Alexander I issued a manifesto on 29 November 1813, in which he promised German settlers the following privileges:

- Land donation;
- Interest-free credit;
- Exemption from taxes for 10 years;
- Autonomy;
- Freedom of religion;
- Exemption from military service.

The agents of the Russian crown went with these promises to Württemberg, the northeast German area (Mecklenburg) and into the Duchy of Warsaw, where German settlers had established themselves only a few years before.

=== Emigration ===
Between 1814 and 1842 over 2,000 families consisting of approximately 9,000 people migrated to the Russian Bessarabia. Most came from the South German areas of Württemberg, Baden, the Palatinate, Bavaria and Alsace, France, the peak occurring in 1817.

After the distribution of passports by German authorities they began the journey in larger groups, known as Kolonnen (lit. "columns"). The time taken for the c. 2,000 km journey was between two and six months, depending upon travel route. Many of those emigrating due to religious reasons formed Harmonien (harmonies).

For the emigrants from South Germany, the journey usually followed the course of the River Danube, which they followed as far as Ulm (about 100 km south-east of Stuttgart and 130 km north-west of Munich). There they boarded Ulm boxes, a sort of one-way boat. Many emigrants fell ill and died while travelling on these boats. The journey carried them downriver to the Danube delta shortly before the Black Sea. Upon arrival at Izmail, the migrants were quarantined for weeks on an island in the delta which claimed further victims. About 10% of the emigrants are thought not to have survived the voyage.

Emigrants from the northern and eastern German regions, as well as from Poland, travelled by horse and cart. They were the first Germans to arrive in Bessarabia, in 1814, and were known as Warsaw Colonists because of their origins.

=== Reasons for emigration ===
Reasons for emigration from the Duchy of Warsaw were:

- Objection to Polish rule;
- A worsening economic situation.

Reasons for emigration from South Germany were:

- Compulsory military service;
- Serfdom;
- The oppressive regime;
- Crop failures and famine;
- High taxes;
- Land shortages;
- Religious;
  - Pietism – Protestant Reformation movement for practical piety;
  - Millennialism – Belief in a Golden Age where "Christ will reign" for a thousand years.

== Colonisation under Russian rule ==
=== Settlement ===
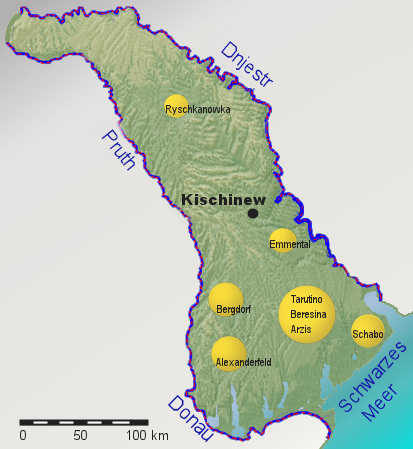
Main settlement areas of the 150 German colonies in Bessarabia

Tsarist Russia settled the German migrants in Bessarabia according to plan. They kept land in the southern region, on assigned far, treeless steppe surfaces in the Southern Bessarabia (Budjak; germ. Budschak). In the first settlement phase, up to 1842, twenty-four main German colonies developed. The settlements were put on usually in a valley with gently sloping hills. The farms were up to 50 m wide, and bordered by acacias. While properties were only 20 metres wide at the roadside, they extended up to 250 metres in depth. The elongated, single-storey houses always stood with the gable facing the road. The whitewashed buildings were built of loam bricks or natural stone. On the farmyard were stables, threshing-rooms and a stockroom and wine cellar. In the rear part of an estate lay fruit and vegetable gardens and vineyards.

=== Autonomy ===
The autonomy of the German settlers promised by the Tsar during the recruitment took place via a Russian special authority by the name of Fürsorgekomitee (Welfare Service Committee), previously Vormundschaftskontor. It was concerned with the settlement of all German settlers in south Russia, with its location initially in Chișinău, later in Odesa. The official language of the department, to which belonged one president and approximately 20 co-workers (an official translator, a physician, a veterinary surgeon, a land measurer and so on), was German. Their presidents were:

Name	Term of Office
General Ivan Insov	1818–1845
Staatsrat Eugene von Hahn	1845–1849
Baron von Rosen	1849–1853
Baron von Mestmacher	1853–1856
Islawin	1856–1858
Alexander von Hamm	1858–1866
Th. Lysander	1866–1867
Vladimir von Oettinger	1867–1871

The Committee protected the rights of the settlers and supervised their obligations with regard to the Russian government. Underneath the Fürsorgekomitee there were seventeen offices for those approximately 150 German municipalities, with one selected area chief (Oberschulz). Its tasks, among other things, included the administration of the fire service.

== Place names ==
Originally, the plots of land given to the settlers carried only numbers, e.g. "Steppe 9". In the early years of the settlement, the Fürsorgekomitee began renaming the villages. These designations were reminders of the places of victorious battles against Napoleon such as Tarutino, Borodino, Beresina, Dennewitz, Arzis, Brienne, Paris, Leipzig, Katzbach and Teplitz, where the Triple Alliance was signed. Later, after 1842, the settlers began naming their own villages after their own aspirations – Hoffnungstal (hope valley), Friedenstal (peace valley) – or religious motives – Gnadental (grace valley), Lichtental (light valley). Numerous German establishments of village took on Romanian or Turkish-Tatar origins, such as Albota (white horse), Basyrjamka (salt hole) Kurudschika (drying), and Sarata (salty).

=== Settlement development ===
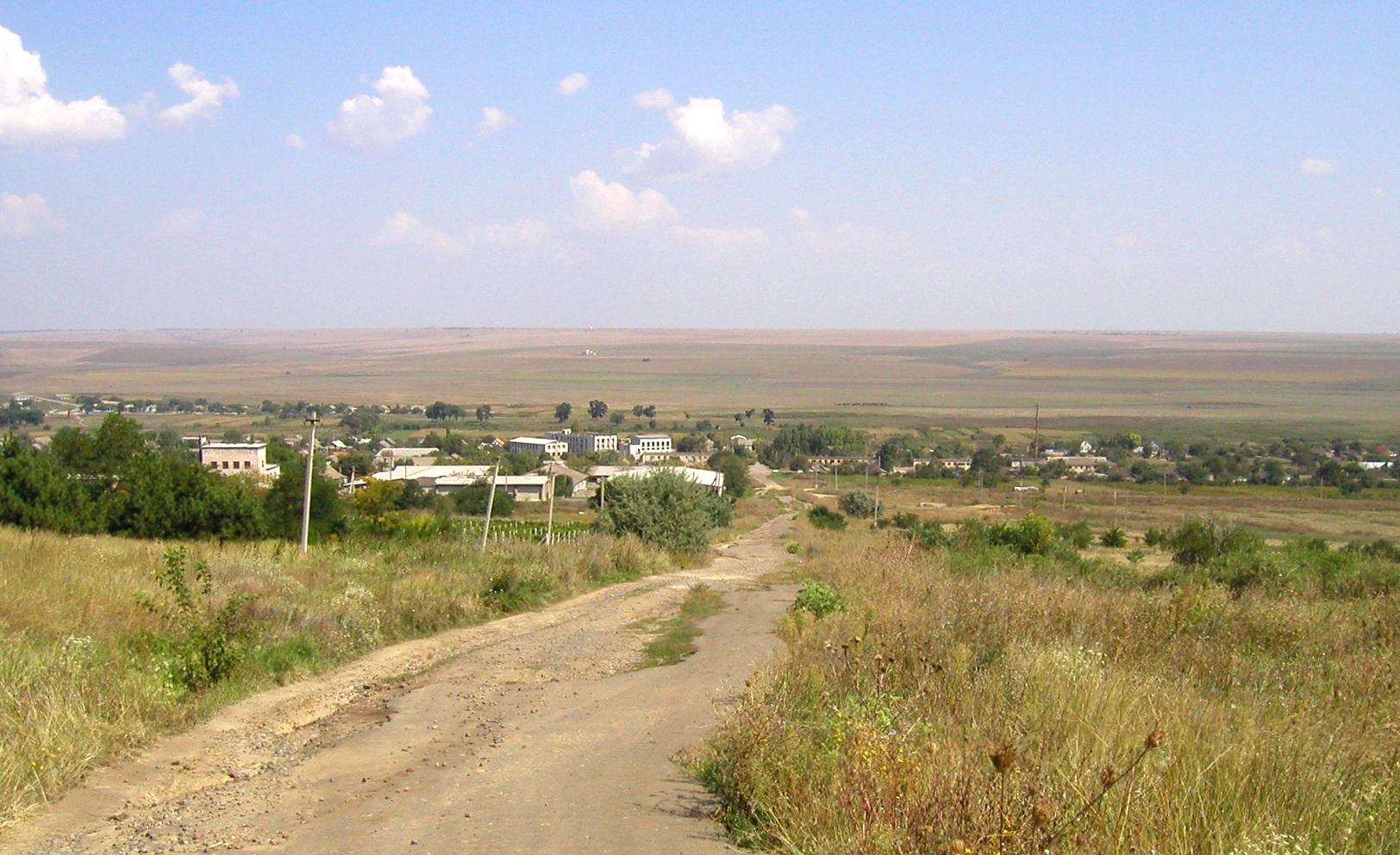
Klöstitz or Vesela Dolyna, Odesa Oblast as it is currently known, an example of a former typical rural Bessarabian German settlement

Despite the incentives granted early on, the living conditions in the colonies were tough. Unusual climate and diseases extinguished whole families. Cattle disease, floods, epidemic diseases such as plague and cholera, crop failures and swarms of grasshoppers obstructed reconstruction work. The early dwellings were usually earth houses with reed roofs. Only in later generations a regulated and independent life in economic, cultural and religious areas prevailed in the German settlements. The colloquial language was German, the official language was Russian. Characteristic of the settlers were diligence, religious devotion, large families and thriftiness.

The first twenty-four villages of German emigrants were called "mother colonies". They still developed in the context of the national Russian Colonisation. Those settlements developed after 1842 developed were called "daughter colonies". They were mainly due to the private settlement of native Bessarabians already living in the country. The first 24 colonies were:

Settlement	Established	Settlement	Established	Settlement	Established
Borodino	1814	Alt-Elft	1816	Neu-Arzis	1824
Krasna, a village in Bolhrad Raion	1814	Paris	1816	Neu-Elft	1825
Tarutino	1814	Arzis	1816	Gnadental	1830
Klöstitz	1815	Brienne	1816	Lichtental	1834
Kulm	1815	Teplitz	1817	Dennewitz	1834
Wittenberg	1815	Katzbach	1821	Friedenstal	1834
Beresina	1815	Sarata	1822	Plotzk	1839
Leipzig	1815	Alt-Posttal	1823	Hoffnungstal	1842

=== Agriculture ===
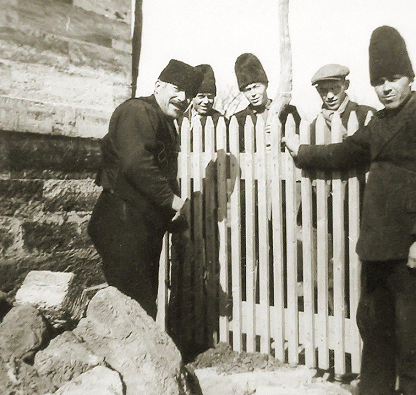
A group of Bessarabian Germans, circa 1935

As ordered by the Tsar during his recruitment, almost all newcomers worked as farmers. Each German family received 60 desyatinas (about 65 hectares) from the state. The settlement area lay in the Bessarabian black earth belt, whose earth is considered among the best farming land in Europe. As such, fertilisation was not needed. The main crops grown were wheat and corn. In some colonies wide viticulture was operated (see Moldovan wine), but most farms only produced enough wine for their own needs.

The Germans operated animal husbandry only to a small extent, because the resulting dung was not required due to the high soil fertility. Therefore, it was usually dried and used in the winter as fuel. Shepherding was more widespread, especially the fine-wooled Karakul sheep. The men's traditional black skin caps were made from the wool. Poultry farming for self-sufficiency was a matter of course on each individual farm. Unlike other farming people, the Germans used horses instead of oxen for ploughing.

=== New settlements ===
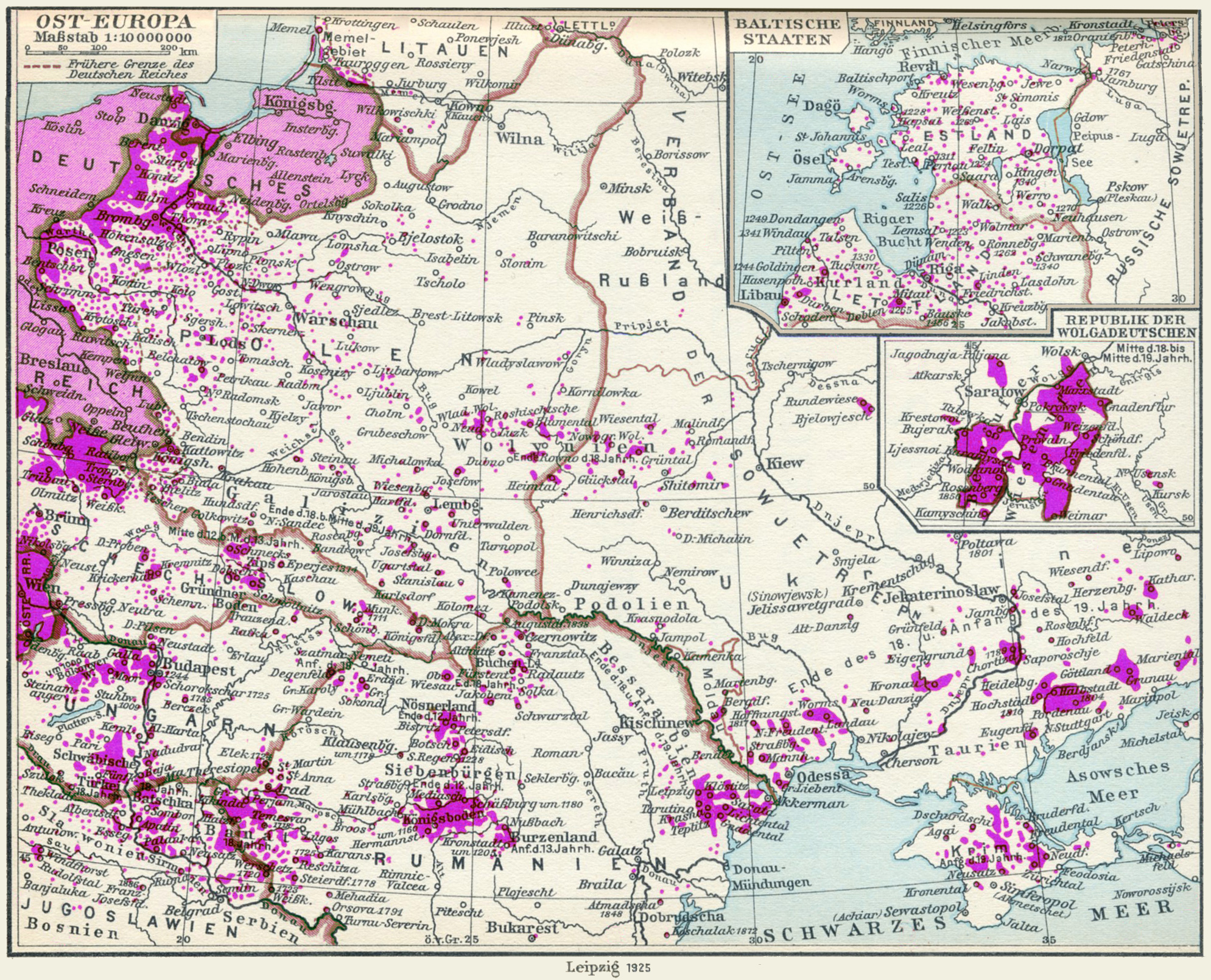
Distribution of ethnic Germans in Central/Eastern Europe in 1925, also highlighting German settlements in Bessarabia

With the establishment of the last colony (Hoffnungstal) in 1842, the influx of emigrants from Germany ended. Afterwards, a self-colonisation began by private settlement within the country. The boundaries of the twenty-four Mutterkolonies had become limited due to increase in the population. Bessarabian Germans bought or leased land from large Russian landowners and created new villages.

In 1920, two years after the Union of Bessarabia with Romania, began the Romanian agrarian reform, in which large land owners with more than 100 hectares were expropriated of the land in excess of that. Their property was distributed to the peasants, who each received 6 hectares. Hektardörfer, or hectare-towns sprang up on the free land. Approximately 150 German settlements resulted during the presence of the Germans in Bessarabia between 1814 and 1940.

=== Departure from Bessarabia ===
A treaty of Nonaggression between the Soviet Union and Germany, also known as the Molotov–Ribbentrop Pact (Vyacheslav Molotov and Joachim von Ribbentrop were the foreign ministers of their respective countries)—was a ten-year non-aggression pact, signed on August 23, 1939, promising that neither country would attack the other. It effectively divided Eastern Europe between Germany and the Soviet Union. By a secret protocol to this treaty, the two parties agreed to partition Poland. Germany would have a free hand in western Poland. The Soviet Union would have in its sphere of influence eastern Poland, which the Soviets called western Ukraine and western White Russia; Finland and the three Baltic states; and the Romanian provinces of Bessarabia and Northern Bukovina.

For many of the Germans living in farming settlements in Bessarabia, the German–Soviet Pact was very bad news. They had lived through the Bolshevik Revolution and the early years of the Soviet regime, before their countries of residence were detached from the Soviet Union and given to Romania. Although they did not want to leave their homes and farms, the majority had absolutely no desire to be Soviet subjects again.

This compelled Nazi Germany to take action and relocate these ethnic Germans. By a further amendment to the treaty, dated September 28, 1939, agreement was reached between Germany and the Soviet Union for a population exchange. Hitler entrusted Heinrich Himmler, the head of the SS (Schutzstaffel, Nazi party paramilitary security service) and police, with the task of their resettlement to territories of western Poland, recently occupied by the Wehrmacht (German Army), and in the process of incorporation into the Reich. The Volksdeutsche Mittelstelle (often shortened to VoMi), a department of the SS, carried out the relocation and settlement of the ethnic Germans, known in German as Volksdeutsche. In return, any Russian, White Russian, or Ukrainian living in German-occupied Poland had the right to be resettled in the Soviet Union. As this was a voluntary movement, it was all in one westward direction.

Resettlement implementation was carried out by teams made up of SS officers and their Soviet counterparts, who interviewed each family individually to ensure that it was of German origin and wanted to be evacuated. The ethnic Germans greeted these teams with enthusiasm and attempted to document their German heritage by any means. Cooperation of the Soviet officials was sometimes positive and sometimes obstructionist, as many non-German anticommunists also tried to leave, usually without success.

The population transfer began in the Baltic states of Latvia and Estonia, where 66,000 and 20,000 people, respectively, settled in Germany in the late fall of 1939. The Nazi government was disappointed in the quality of these immigrants. They wanted farmers to colonize the newly conquered lands in the Polish West, not urban residents, many of whom were elderly and without children. In winter 1939–1940, about 60,000 ethnic Germans were brought from Volhynia, western Ukraine, first to a transit camp in Lodz in occupied Poland, and because the majority of these settlers were farmers, they were sent to the former Polish provinces of Poznan (Posen), now renamed the German province of Warthegau, or to West Prussia, the region bordering Gdansk (Danzig). The evacuees who were not suitable for farming were settled elsewhere in Germany.

At the end of September 1940, Nazi Germany and the Soviet Union agreed to transfer Germans living in the Romanian provinces of Bessarabia and Bukovina, now occupied by the Red Army. By the end of October of that year, this resettlement was practically complete, with a total of 124,000 ethnic Germans transferred to the Reich. The total number of ethnic Germans resettled into the Reich has been estimated by some historians at 500,000. On arrival in the Reich, most of the resettled Germans were given German citizenship, and the young men were drafted into the Wehrmacht. In accordance with Nazi racist theories of Blut und Boden (Blood and Soil), the goal was to settle the annexed eastern lands with German farmers; the majority were placed on farms in the Warthegau, formerly the Polish province of Poznan, and a smaller number in the former Polish territory of West Prussia. In order to accomplish this, the SS and German army began to expel Polish farmers from these lands, and German re-settlers took over their houses and farms. In their place, 332,000 German evacuees, mostly farmers, were settled on these lands.

=== Escape to West Germany ===
With the close of the war, most of the resettled Germans in West Prussia and Poznan fled before the approaching Soviet Red Army towards Germany.

== Demographics ==
Historical population
Year	Pop.	±%
1826	9,000	—
1828	8,846	−1.7%
1856	24,000 (Note: Historian Constantin Ungureanu ascribes a slightly different figure for 1856, more specifically 24,200, still accounting for the same total of 2.4% of Bessarabia's population.)	+171.3%
1862	24,160	+0.7%
1897	60,000	+148.3%
1889	60,026	+0.0%
1919	79,000	+31.6%
1930	81,000	+2.5%
1940	93,300	+15.2%
1941	2,058	−97.8%
Source: Ion Gumenâi (1828), Ion Nistor (1856), Russian census (1899), Romanian census (1919), Romanian census (1939), and other estimates

The Bessarabia Germans represented one of the least numerous ethnic groups which settled and lived in Bessarabia along the passing of time. During the early and mid 19th century, more specifically in 1828 and 1856, the Bessarabia Germans accounted for 1.71% and 2.4% of the total population of Bessarabia. In 1889, they made up 3.1% (based on linguistic criterion, stating their native language as German). In 1919, under royal Romanian administration, the Bessarabia Germans made up 3.0% of the total population of Bessarabia. In 1941, after the Heim ins Reich re-settlement and during wartime Romanian administration, there were only a little above two thousand ethnic Germans still left in Bessarabia (accounting for 0.1% of Bessarabia's population).

== Bessarabia German institutions ==
=== Church ===
Church and religion shaped the life of all Bessarabian Germans, because many of their ancestors had once left their German homeland for religious reasons. Abroad they kept the German language in use in the Bible and in the hymn books. In newly founded villages, places of worship were the first communal facilities to be created. In larger municipalities this was a church for a congregation of up to 1,000; in smaller municipalities this was a prayer house, in which the sexton's accommodation and the village school were included as well. The colonists paid for the maintenance of the church, school, sexton and teacher (usually a sexton-teacher with a dual role).

The majority of the approximately 150 German settlements were organized in 13 Kirchspielen (parishes) and three Pfarrgemeinden of Lutheran denomination. Each parish had a minister, who was responsible for several villages within the parish. Besides there was Reformed parish (Schabo) and a Roman Catholic church district with four municipalities (Balmas, Emmental, Krasna, Larga). These belonged to the diocese Cherson, which was created on July 3, 1848. The name of the diocese was changed to Tiraspol shortly afterwards. The seat of the diocese was relocated to Saratov by the first bishop Ferdinand Helanus, where it remained until 1918. Bishop Josef Alois Kessler relocated the seat to Odessa to escape the Bolsheviks, but after their victory he fled to Germany in 1921 and the diocese was disbanded in the Soviet Republic.

=== Educational facilities ===
On the lowest level there were elementary schools in the German villages. In the first years usually someone from the village taught the school children, until 1892, when only graduate teachers were allowed to teach. A gymnasium (grammar school) for boys and girls was located in Tarutino. In Sarata the Werner school for teacher training was located.

== Notable people ==
- Horst Köhler (1943–2025), former President of Germany, CDU politician
- Heinrich Lhotzky (1859–1930), Protestant/religious author
- Artur Văitoianu (1864–1956), former Prime Minister of Romania
- Immanuel Winkler (1886–1932), official representative of Bessarabia Germans

== See also ==
- Black Sea Germans
- Bukovina Germans
- Dobrujan Germans
- Germans of Romania
