= Stepan Poltorak =

Ukrainian general and politician

- Степан Полторак
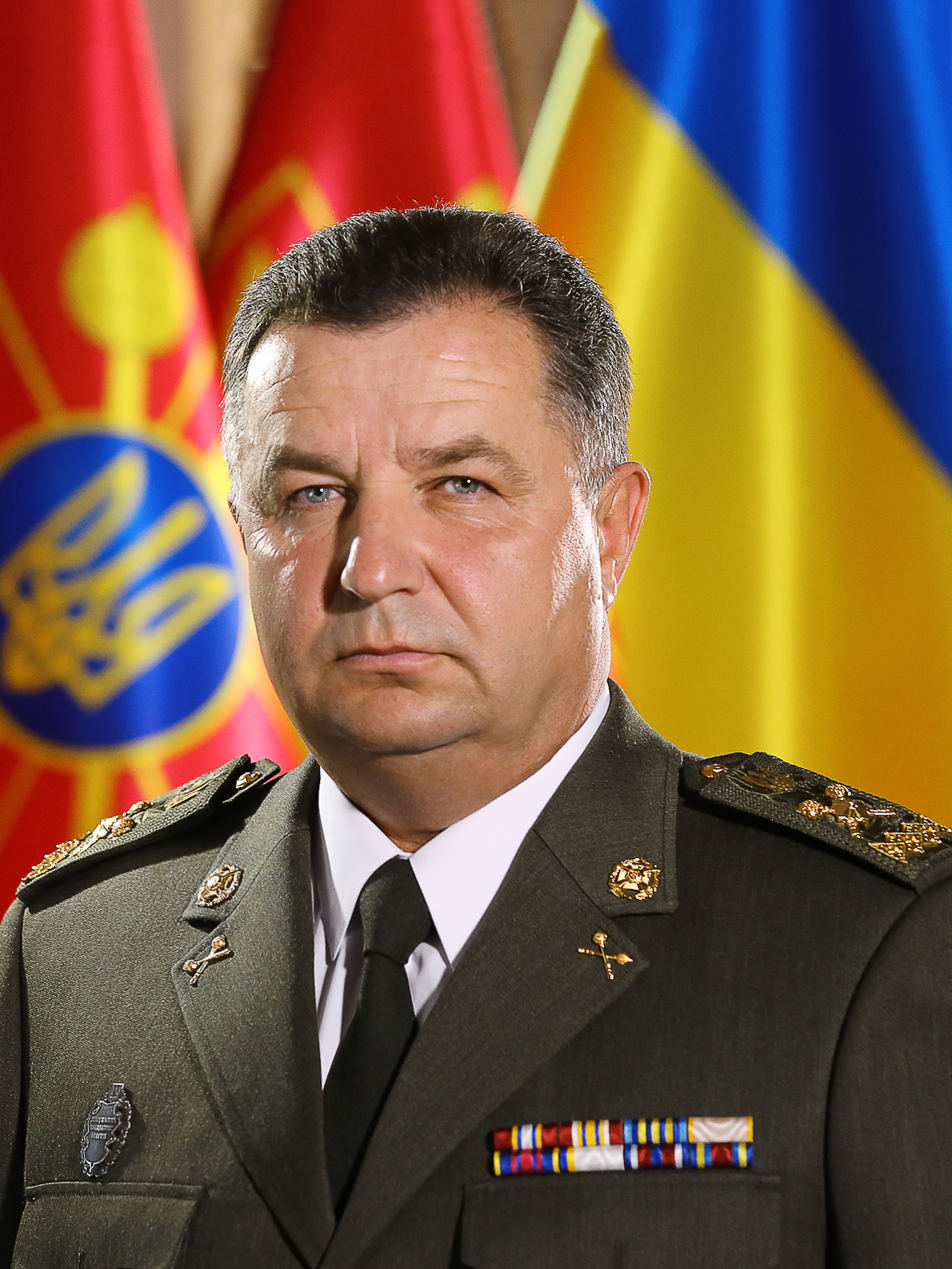
- Official portrait, 2013

14th Minister of Defence of Ukraine
- In office 14 October 2014 – 29 August 2019
- President: Petro Poroshenko; Volodymyr Zelenskyy
- Preceded by: Valeriy Heletey
- Succeeded by: Andriy Zahorodniuk

Personal details
- Born: Stepan Tymofiyovych Poltorak; 11 February 1965 (age 61) Vesela Dolyna, Odesa Oblast, Ukrainian SSR, Soviet Union

Military service
- Allegiance: Soviet Union (1983–1991); Ukraine (1992–2018)
- Branch/service: Internal troops of the Soviet Union (1983-1991); Internal Troops of Ukraine (1992-2014); National Guard of Ukraine (2014-2018)
- Years of service: 1983–2018
- Rank: General of the army of Ukraine
- Commands: National Academy of Internal Troops (2002–2014); Internal Troops/National Guard (2014)

Stepan Tymofiyovych Poltorak (Ukrainian: Степан Тимофійович Полторак) is a Ukrainian general who served as the Minister of Defence of Ukraine from 14 October 2014 until 29 August 2019. Previously he was the commander of the Internal Troops of Ukraine and National Guard of Ukraine. Poltorak's rank was General of the army of Ukraine. From 1 January 2019, Poltorak remained the country's defense minister as a civilian, after resigning from military service in October 2018. Poltorak resigned at the request of newly inaugurated president Volodymyr Zelenskyy on 20 May 2019.

== Biography ==
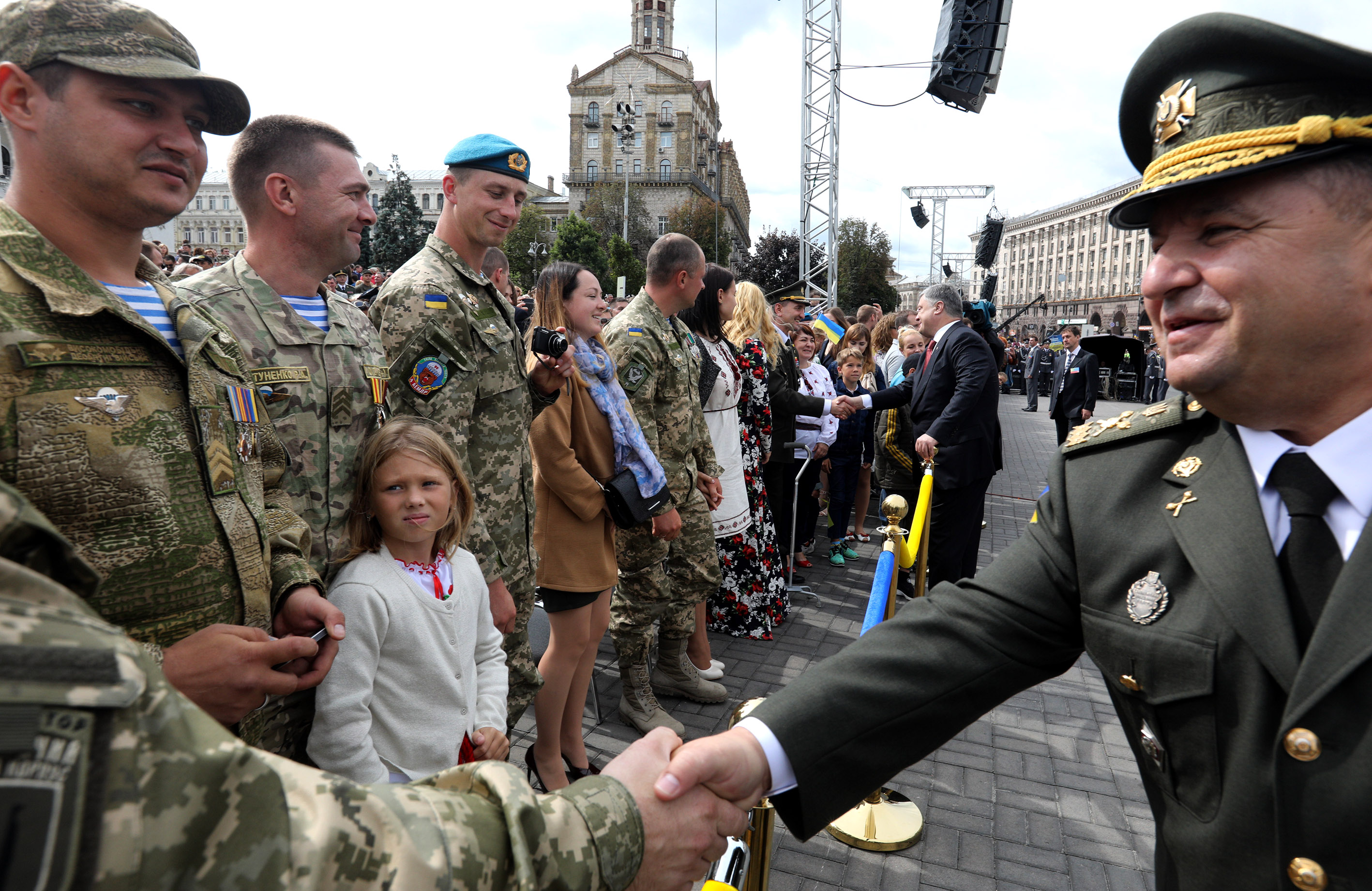
Poltorak shaking hands with veterans at the 2017 Kyiv Independence Day Parade.

Poltorak was born on 11 February 1965 in the village Vesela Dolyna (located in the Bolhrad Raion, Odesa Oblast). He has served in the military since August 1983. Poltorak is a graduate from Ordzhonikidzevsky highest military command college of the Ministry of Internal Affairs of the USSR.

Poltorak has a Ph.D. In 2003 he successfully defended his thesis on "Pedagogical conditions of the skills of the commander unit in the future officers of the Interior Ministry of Ukraine."

In March 2002 Poltorak was appointed head of the Academy of the Interior Ministry of Ukraine in Kharkiv.

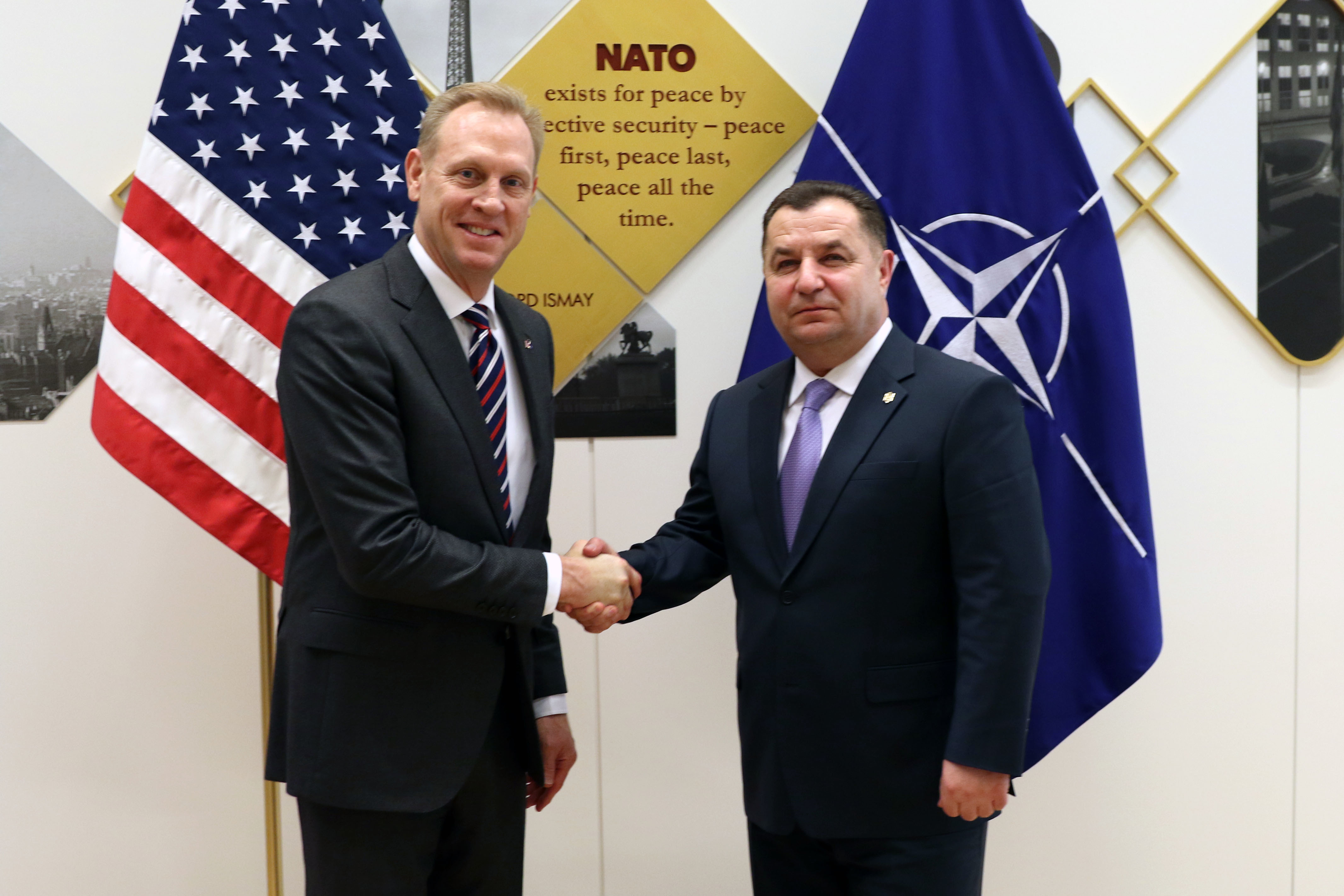
Poltorak meeting U.S. Defense Secretary Patrick Shanahan at the NATO meeting of defense ministers, February 14, 2019

On 28 February 2014 acting President of Ukraine Oleksandr Turchynov appointed Poltorak commander of the Internal Troops of Ukraine.

When the National Guard of Ukraine was reestablished on 13 March 2014, Poltorak became its first commander on 15 April 2014.

On 14 October 2014, Ukraine's Verkhovna Rada approved Poltorak's appointment as Ukraine's Minister of Defence. , replacing Valeriy Heletey, who was appointed head of the State Security Administration after President Petro Poroshenko accepted his resignation.

President Poroshenko accepted Poltorak's resignation from military service on 13 October 2018. Poltorak stayed on as Minister of Defence.

Poltorak resigned at the request of newly inaugurated president Volodymyr Zelenskyy on 20 May 2019. His official tenure as Defence Minister ended on 29 August 2019 when Andriy Zahorodniuk was appointed his successor.

== Family and personal life ==
Poltorak is married to Inna (who is two years younger than him) and has an adult son called Ihor. His wife is a captain at Poltorak former posting, the Academy of the Interior Ministry of Ukraine in Kharkiv.

== Awards and decorations ==
Order of Bohdan Khmelnytsky 1st class
Order of Bohdan Khmelnytsky 3rd class
Medal "For Irreproachable Service"
Defender of the Motherland Medal
Medal of Zhukov
Medal for Battle Merit
Jubilee Medal "70 Years of the Armed Forces of the USSR"
Medal "For Impeccable Service"
Honorary citizen of Kharkiv

Military offices
Preceded by post of Commander of the Internal Troops	Commander of the National Guard of Ukraine; 2014	Succeeded by Oleksandr Kryvenko as acting
Preceded by Serhiy Yarovyi	Commander of the Internal Troops of Ukraine; 2014	Succeeded by post of Commander of the National Guard
Educational offices
Preceded by	Chief of the Internal Troops Academy; 2002–2014	Succeeded by Volodymyr Penkov
