= Yenicə, Yevlakh =

Yenicə
- Location within Azerbaijan
- Coordinates: 40°43′N 47°13′E
- Country: Azerbaijan
- City: Yevlakh
- Municipality: Aşağı Bucaq
- Time zone: UTC+4 (AZT)
  - Summer (DST): UTC+5 (AZT)

Yenicə (also, Yenidzha) is a village in the Yevlakh Rayon of Azerbaijan. The village forms part of the municipality of Aşağı Bucaq.
