= Budjak =

Historical region in southwestern Ukraine

Coordinates: 46.0000°N 29.5000°E

- Historical region
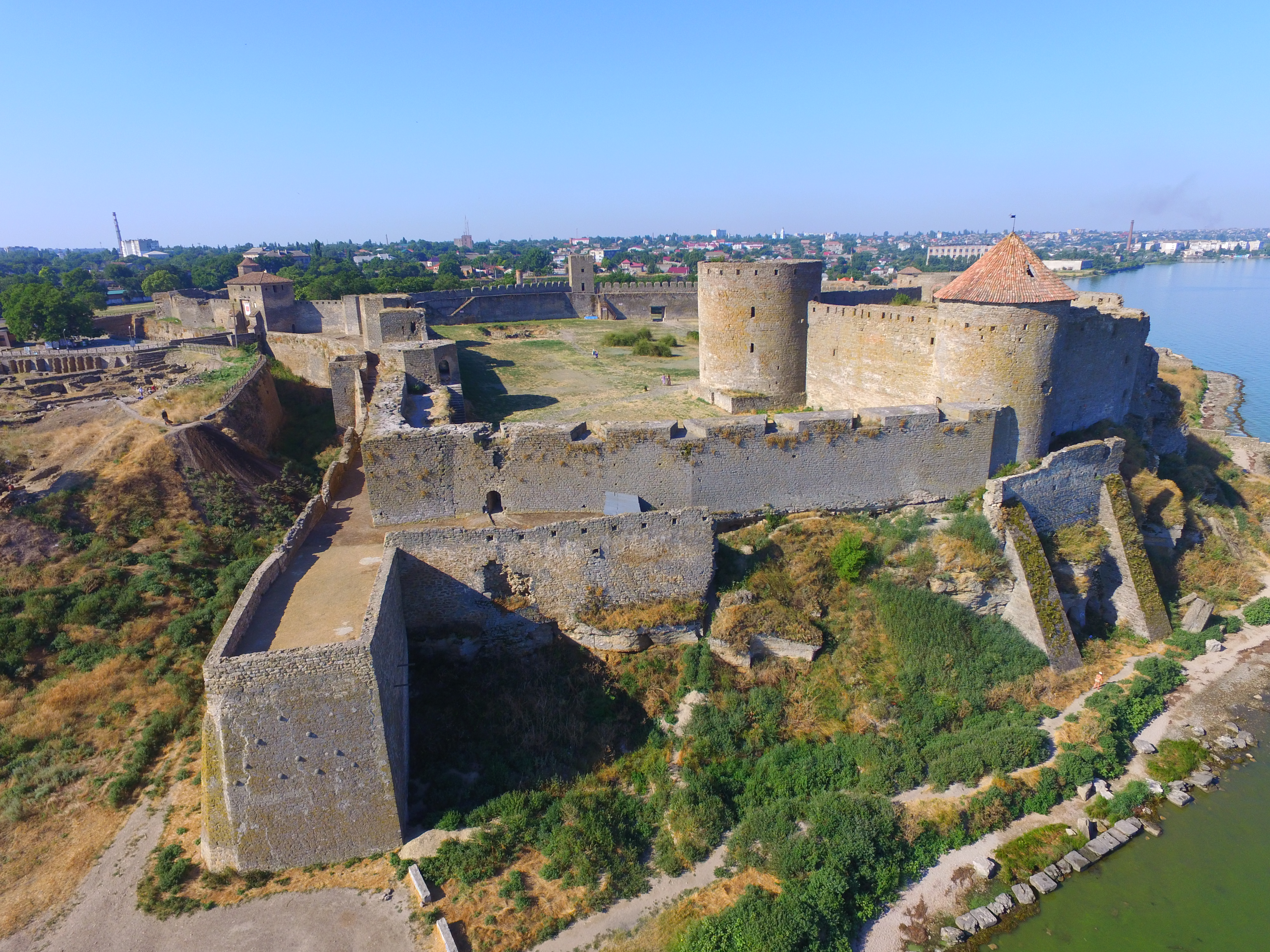
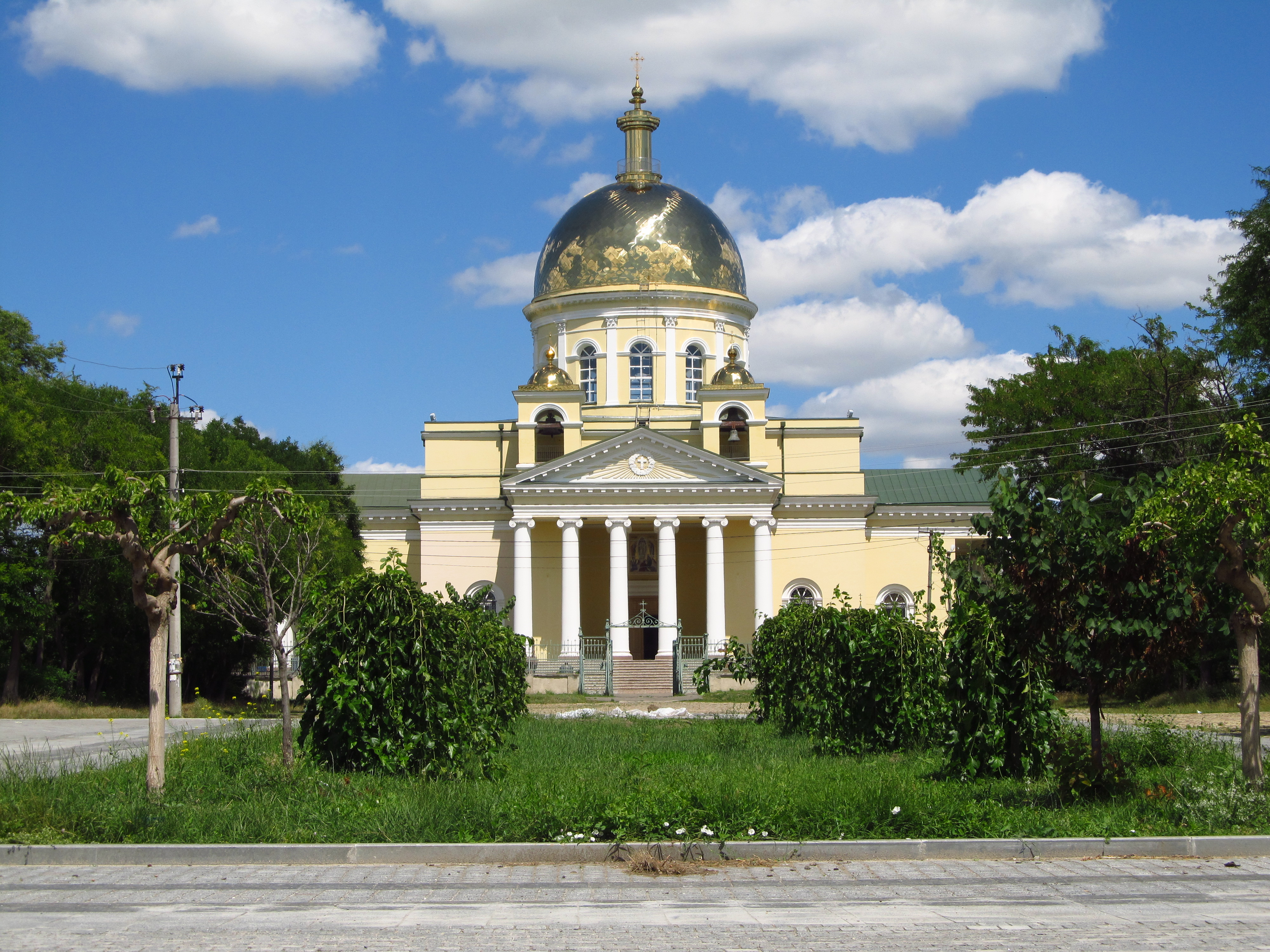
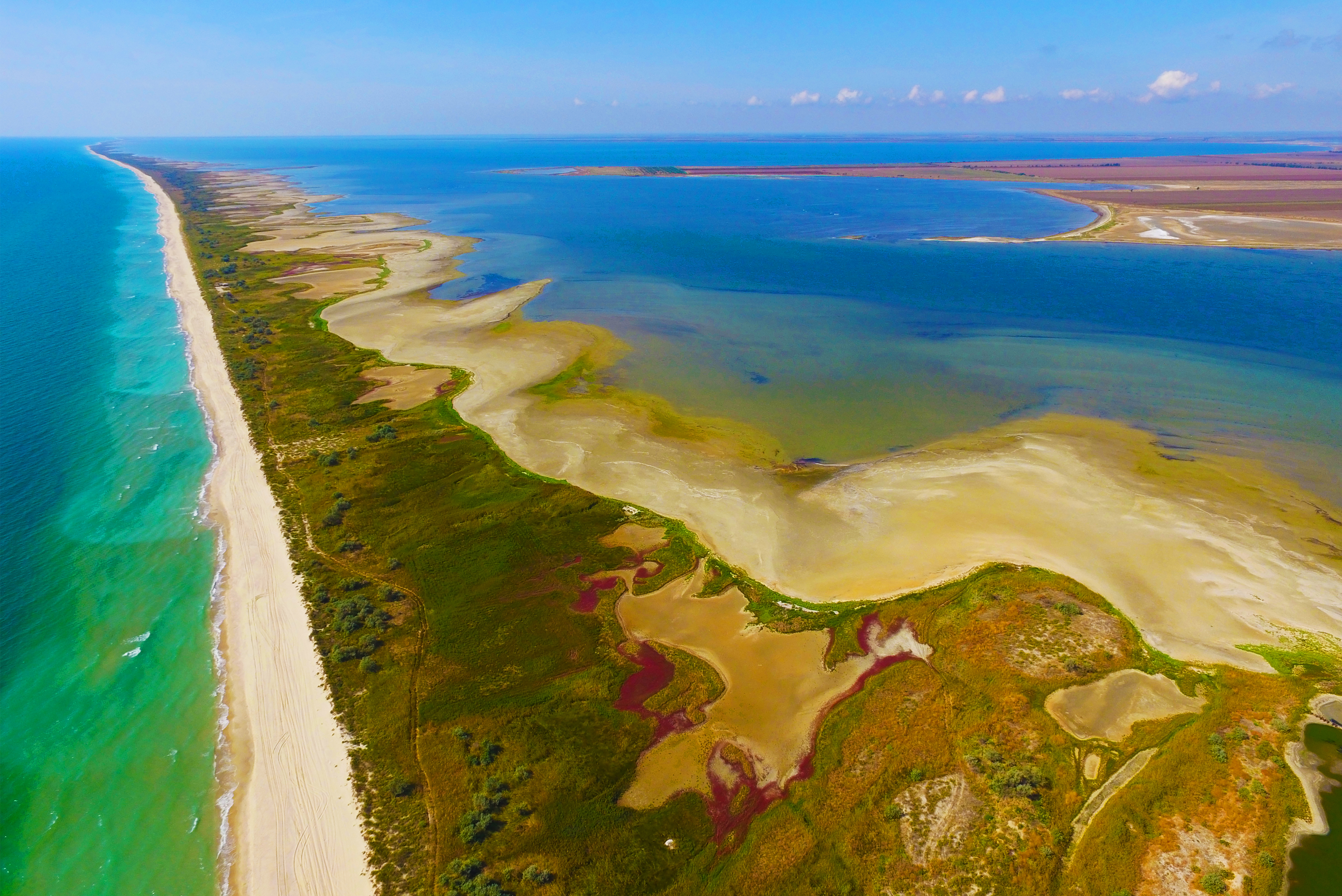
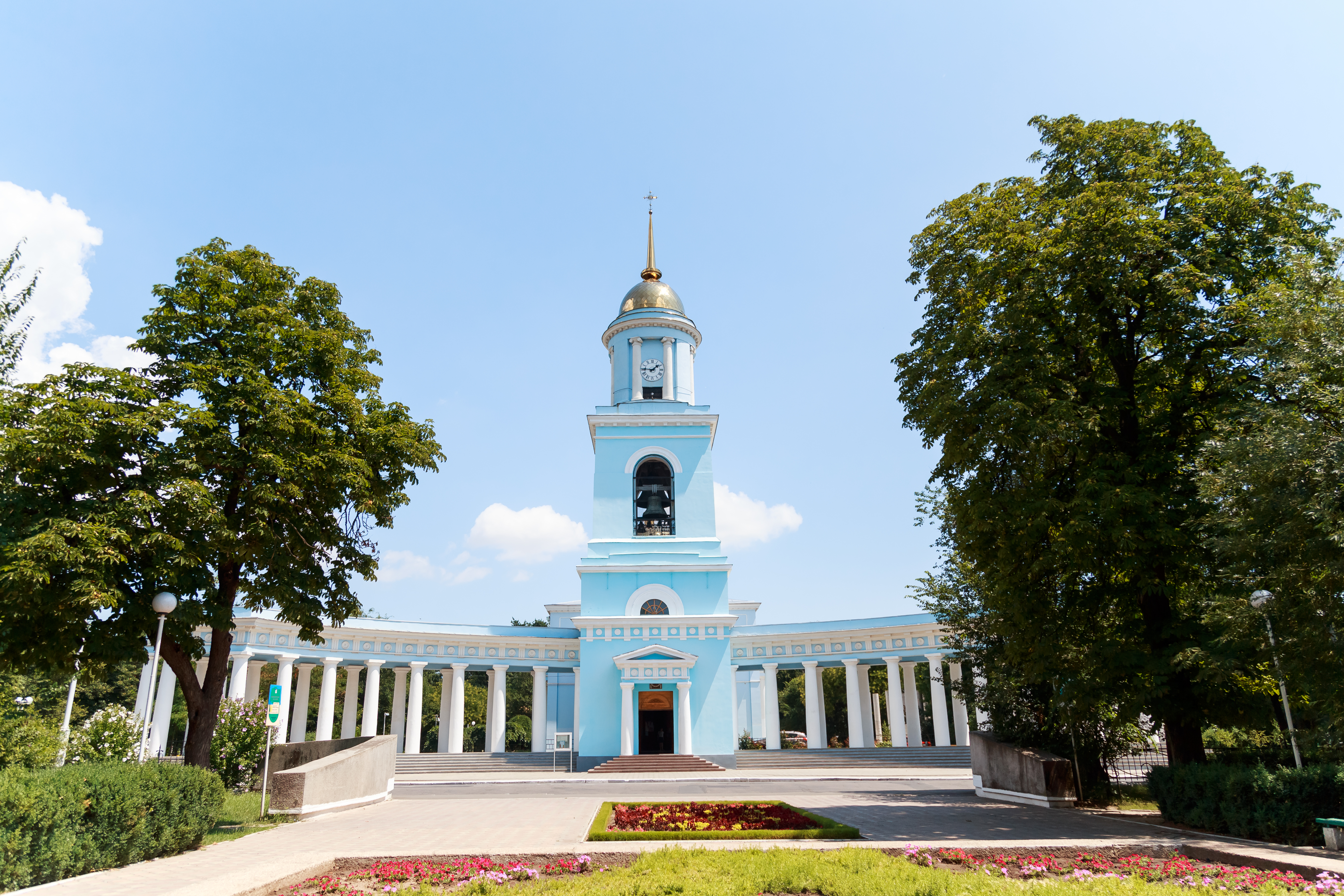
- From top, left to right: Akkerman fortress; Transfiguration Cathedral, Bolhrad; Tuzly Lagoons National Nature Park; Intercession Cathedral, Izmail

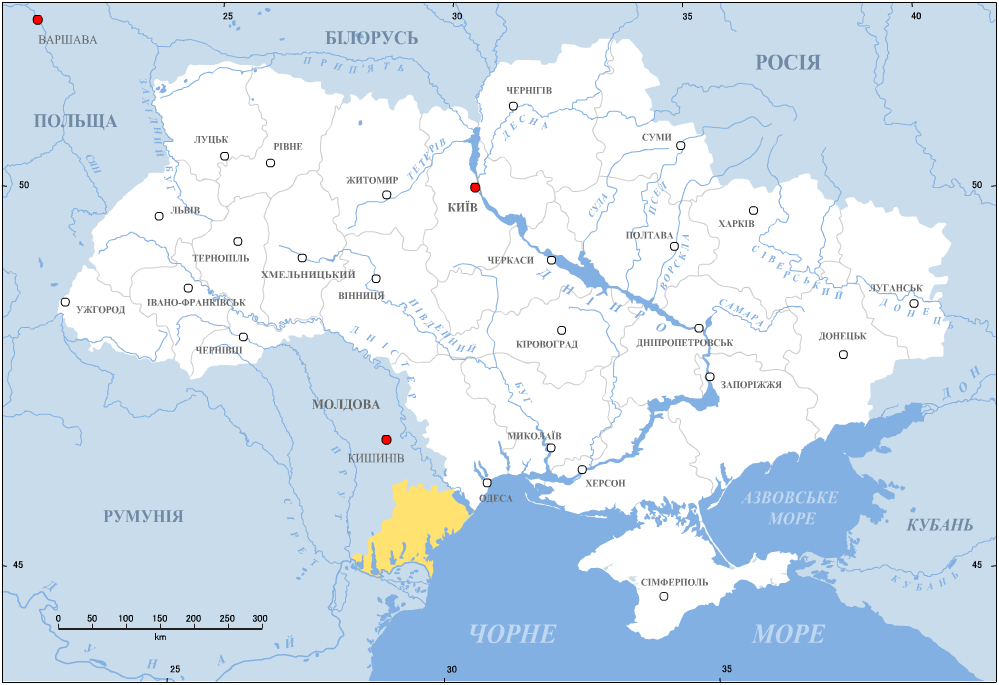
- Budjak on the map of Ukraine
- Country: Ukraine
- Largest city: Izmail
- Time zone: UTC+2 (EET)
  - Summer (DST): UTC+3 (EEST)

Budjak, also known as Budzhak, (Note: Bulgarian, Belarusian, Russian and Ukrainian: Буджак; Romanian: Bugeac; Gagauz and Turkish: Bucak; Crimean Tatar: Bucaq.) is a historical region that was part of Bessarabia from 1812 to 1940. Situated along the Black Sea, between the Danube and Dniester rivers, this multi-ethnic region covers an area of 13,188 km^{2} (5,092 sq mi) and is home to approximately 600,000 people. The majority of the region (former Izmail Oblast) is now located in Ukraine's Odesa Oblast, while the remaining part is found in the southern districts of Moldova. The region is bordered to the north by the rest of Moldova, to the west and south by Romania, and to the east by the Black Sea and the rest of Ukraine.

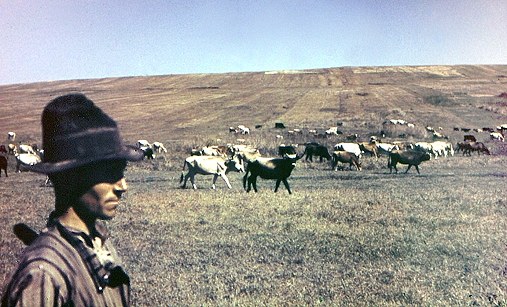
Shepherd in Budjak (1940)

== Name and geography ==
Historically, Budjak was the southeastern steppe region of Moldavia. Bordered by the northern Trajan's Wall at its north end, the Danube river and Black Sea to its south, Tigheci Hills (just east of the Prut River) to the west, and the Dniester River to the east, it was known as "historic Bessarabia" until 1812, when this name was given to the larger region situated between the two rivers, including Budjak. As used in the Middle Ages, the term might (if referring to the geographical area) or might not (if referring to the area predominated by Nogai Tatars) include the environs of Akkerman, Bender, and Kiliia.

The name Budjak itself was given to the area during Ottoman rule (1484–1812) and derives from the Turkish word bucak, meaning "borderland" or "corner", referring roughly to the land between what was then Akkerman (now Bilhorod-Dnistrovskyi), Bender, and Izmail. After 1812, the term Bessarabia came to apply to all of Moldavia east of the Prut River. Consequently, Budjak is often referred to as "Southern Bessarabia".

After the Soviet occupation of Bessarabia in 1940, its southern part, which along with its northern part was included in the Ukrainian SSR (unlike the rest of Bessarabia, which was included in the Moldavian SSR), became known as Budjak, thus being slightly smaller than the historical term.

Besides Southern Bessarabia, other descriptive terms that have been applied to the region include Bulgarian Bessarabia (Ukrainian: Болгарська Бессарабія, translit. Bolhars'ka Bessarabiia), Akkermanshchyna (Ukrainian: Аккерманщина, romanized: Akkermanshchyna), and Western Odesa Oblast (Ukrainian: Західнa Одещина, translit. Zakhidna Odeshchyna).

The area has been termed variously in the English language, including Budjak, Budzhak, Bujak and Buchak. The name has a number of spellings in languages of the region: Budziak in Polish, Bugeac in Romanian, Buxhak in Albanian, Bucak in Turkish, and Буджак in Ukrainian, Bulgarian, and Russian, all pronounced more or less like [budʒak].

== History ==
=== Early history ===
The Budjak culture of the North-West Black Sea region is considered to be important in the context of the Pit-Grave or Yamnaya culture of the Pontic steppe, dating to 3,600–2,300 BC. In particular, Budjak may have given rise to the Balkan-Carpathian variant of Yamnaya culture.

In Classical antiquity, Budjak was inhabited by Tyragetae, Bastarnae, Scythians, and Roxolani. In 6th century BC Ancient Greek colonists established a colony at the mouths of Dnister river, Tyras. Around 2nd century BC, also a Celt tribe settled at Aliobrix (present day Cartal/Orlovka). The Budjak area, the northern Lower Danube, was described as the "wasteland of the Getae" by the ancient Greek geographer Strabo (1st century BC). In fact, based on recent archaeological research, in this period of time, the area was most likely populated by sedentary farmers; among them were the Dacians and the Daco-Romans. The nomad peoples, such as the Sarmatians also passed through the area.

The Romans acquired the area in the 1st century AD, rebuilt and encamped Tyras and Aliobrix. As with the rest of the port cities around the Black Sea, the local population absorbed a mixture of Greek and Roman cultures, with Greek being mainly the language of trade, and Latin the language of politics. After the division of the Roman Empire in 395, the area was included in the East Roman or Byzantine Empire. From the 1st century AD until the invasion of the Avars in 558, the Romans had established cities (poleis), military camps and some stations for the veterans and for the colons (apoikion) sent by the emperors.

The area lay along the predominant route for migratory peoples, as it was the westernmost portion of the Euro-Asian steppe. Going westward, only the banks of the Dniester and Danube rivers were less forested comparatively to the surrounding areas (which nowadays form Moldova and Romania), therefore providing a natural route for herdsmen all the way from Mongolia to the Pannonian Plains (modern Hungary). The region, therefore, passed as a temporary settling ground for the Huns under the leader Uldin (387), the Avars (558–567), the Slavs (end of 6th century), the Bulgars under Asparuh (679), the Magyars (9th century), the Pechenegs (11th century, and again 12th century), the Cumans (12th century) and others.

Although the Byzantines held nominal suzerainty of the region (at least of the sea shore) until the 14th century, they had little or no sway over the hinterland.

In the early Middle Ages a Tigheci "Republic" was formed by several villages occupying the nearby Tigheci hills, in order to offer more security for themselves, while the steppe area between that and the seashore, unsuited for agriculture due to lack of water and frequently invaded by Eastern populations, remained void of permanent settlements. From the 7th to the 12th centuries, the region was under the authority of the First Bulgarian Empire, Pechenegs, and later of Cumans, who irregularly collected tribute from the indigenous villagers.

=== Moldavian and Ottoman rule ===
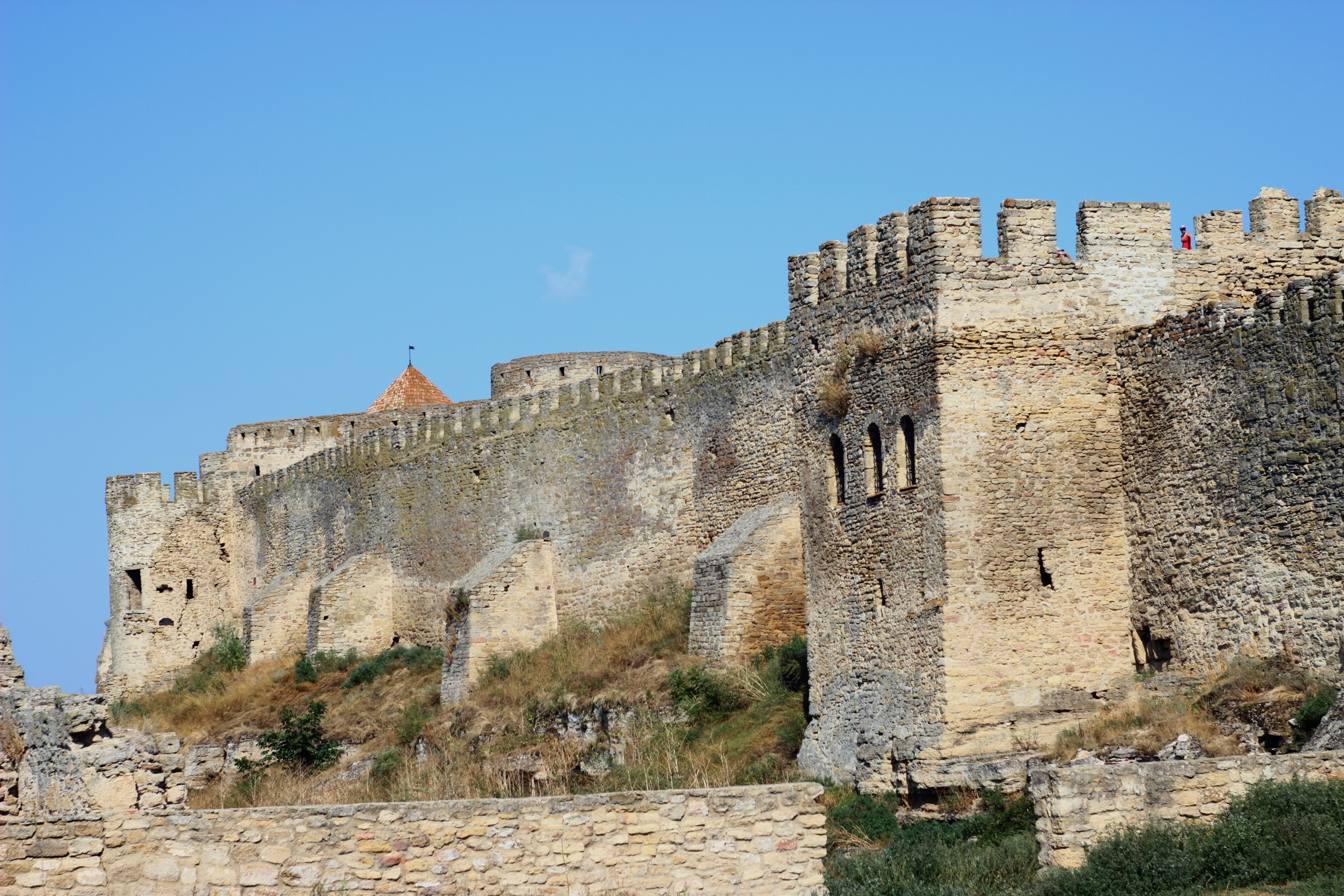
The 14th-century Moldavian fortress of Bilhorod-Dnistrovskyi (Romanian: Cetatea Albă)

After the Mongol invasion of 1241, the rebuilt coastal cities of Budjak (Maurocastro and Licostomo) came under the domination of Genoese traders. The interior however remained under the direct Mongol rule of the Golden Horde.

Sometime during the 14th century Wallachia's princes of the House of Basarab extended their authority over part of the territory. The region remained under Wallachian influence until the early 15th century, during the reign of Mircea the Elder, when the area was integrated into Moldavia by prince Alexander the Kind. Nogai Tatars, who had settled herds in the region after the 1240s, inhabited the steppe, while Romanians inhabited the surrounding hills and the port cities.

In 1484 Stephen the Great of Moldavia was forced to surrender the two main fortresses of Chilia (Kiliia) and Cetatea Albă (Bilhorod-Dnistrovskyi) to the Ottoman Empire, the last Black Sea ports to fall into Ottoman hands. In 1538 the Ottomans forced prince Petru Rareș of Moldavia to give up the fortress-city Tighina as well. Under the Ottomans, Tighina was renamed Bender, while Chilia lost importance due to the construction of the Izmail fortress at the location of the Moldavian village Smil. Despite returning from Muslim to Orthodox Christian sovereignty, the latter names were retained by the Russian Empire.

Under Ottoman rule, the three major cities each were the center of a sanjak, and were together officially part of Silistra (or Özi) Eyalet although Bender was north of Trajan's Wall and outside of the steppe region. The Nogai Tatar-inhabited steppe, which then acquired the name Budjak, served as a buffer area between these sanjaks and the Principality of Moldavia. Although it was a tributary of the Ottoman Empire, Moldavia was independent in its internal affairs until the start of the Russo-Turkish Wars forced the Ottomans to ensure that the Romanian princes did not switch sides too often.

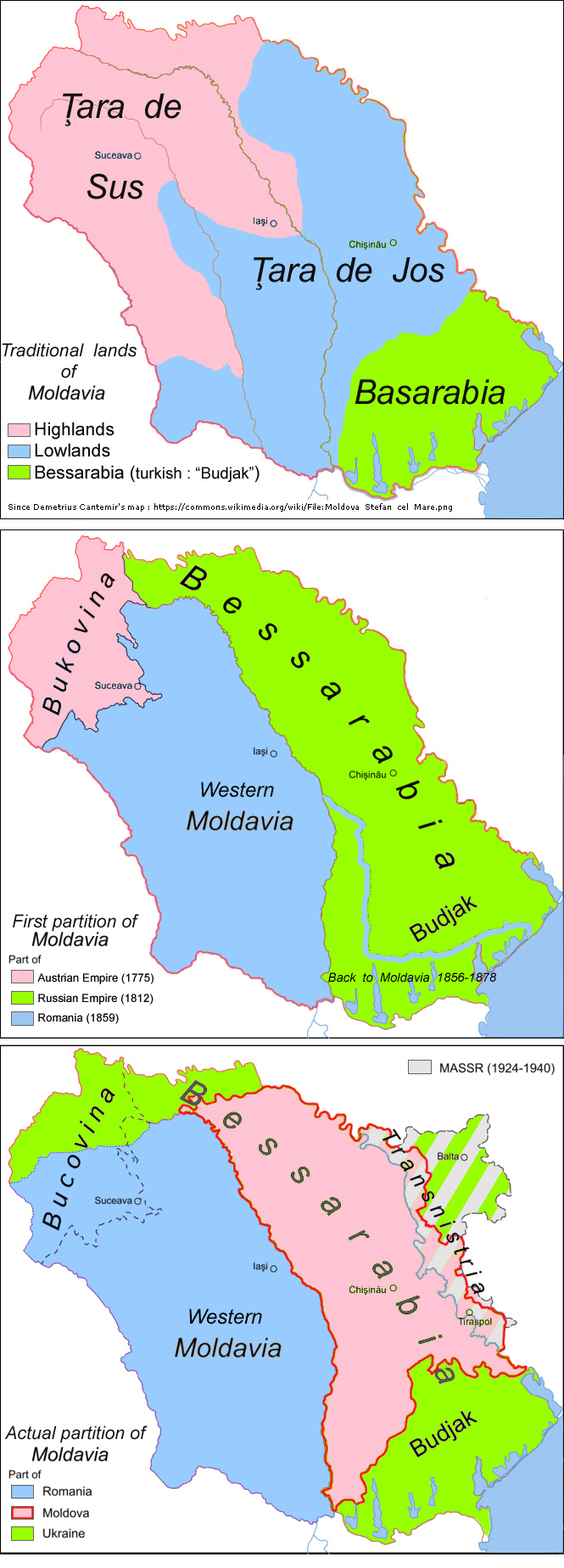
The region of Budjak within historical Moldavia

=== Modern history ===
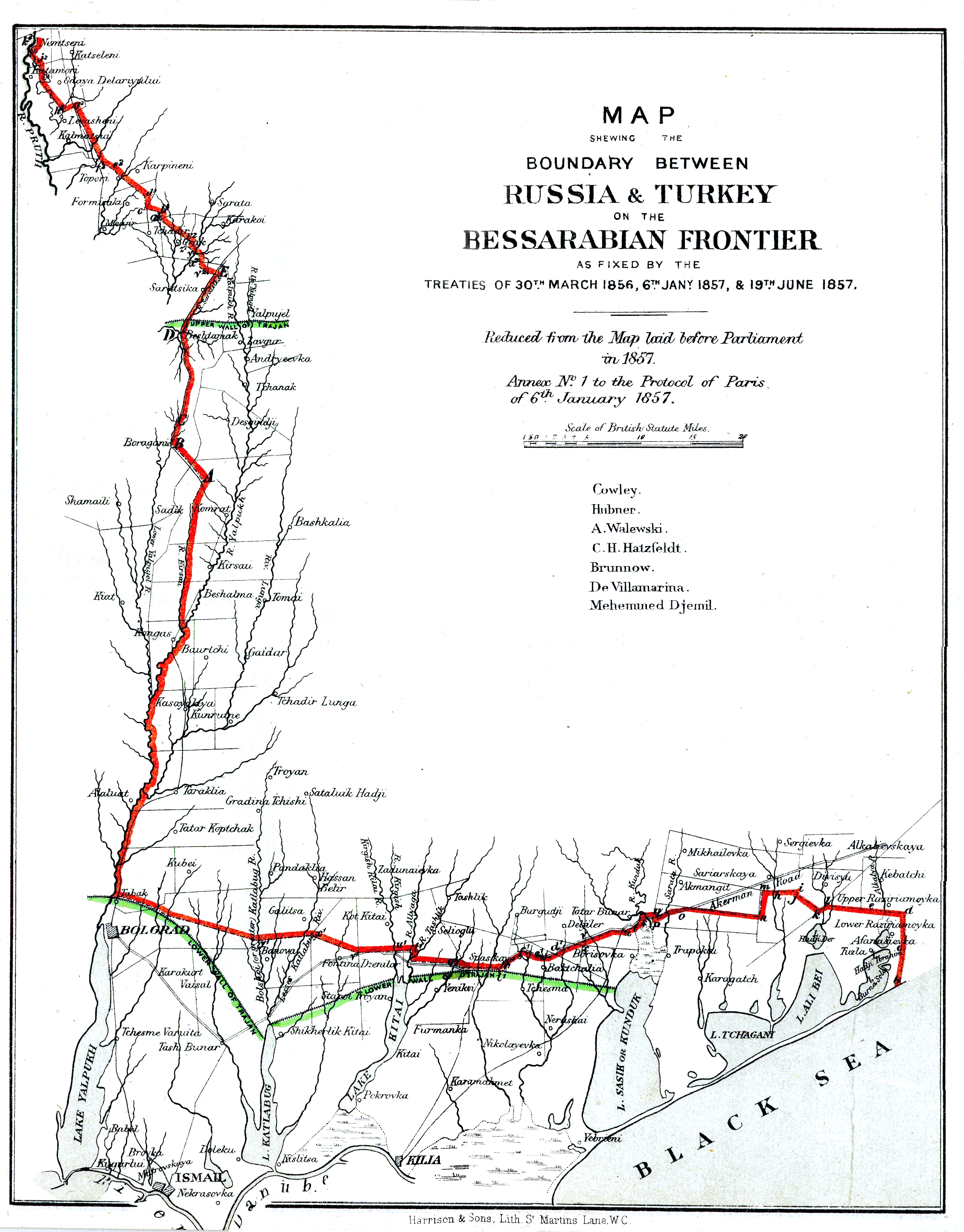
The Moldavian-Russian (starting with 1859 the Romanian-Russian) boundary between 1856/1857 and 1878

During the Napoleonic Era, Budjak was overrun by Russia in the course of the Russo-Turkish War of 1806–1812. The 1812 Treaty of Bucharest transferred the territories of Moldavia and the Ottoman Empire east of the Prut River and north of the Danube, including Budjak, to Russian control. With the Russian annexation, the name Bessarabia began to be applied not only to the original southern region, but to the entire eastern half of historical Moldavia acquired by the Russian Empire, while Budjak was applied to southern Bessarabia, mainly to the steppe.

With Russia's 1856 defeat in the Crimean War, a part of southern Bessarabia including a part of Budjak (Reni, Izmail, Bolhrad, Kiliia) was ceded by the Russian Empire back to the Principality of Moldavia, which soon united with Wallachia to form the United Principalities (which was made a personal union in 1859 to then be deepened into a full union in 1862, as the Principality of Romania). Following the Russo-Turkish War of 1877–78, the Treaty of San Stefano and the Treaty of Berlin recognized the full independence of the new Kingdom of Romania (the principalities that formed it had already been de facto independent for half a century), but transferred the territories subject to the 1856 re-configuration back to the Russian Empire.

After World War I, Budjak, which was part of the Russian Bessarabia Governorate that voted to join Romania, was administered as parts of Tighina, Ismail, and Cetatea Albă counties (judeţe). As the region was inhabited by non-Romanian majorities, it initially witnessed several revolts against the central authorities, such as the Bender Uprising of 1919 and the Tatarbunary Uprising of 1924.

In 1939, the secret appendix to the Molotov–Ribbentrop Pact assigned Bessarabia to the Soviet Union's sphere of influence and, in June 1940, the Soviets issued an ultimatum demanding the transfer of Bessarabia and Northern Bukovina. King Carol II of Romania acquiesced and the area was annexed. Central and northern Bessarabia formed the center of the new Moldavian Soviet Socialist Republic but part of the south, now known as Budjak, was apportioned to the Ukrainian SSR. The commission that decided the administrative border between the Ukrainian SSR and Moldavian SSR inside the Soviet Union was chaired by Nikita Khrushchev, the then leader of the Ukrainian SSR and the future USSR leader who would add Crimea to the Ukrainian SSR.

On 7 August 1940 the Soviets formed Akkerman Oblast, which was administratively subdivided into 13 raions. The city of Akkerman (Bilhorod-Dnistrovskyi) was the center of the oblast. Four months later, on 7 December 1940 the oblast was renamed Izmail Oblast, and the oblast center was moved to the city of Izmail. In June 1941, 3,767 people were deported, or on the list of people eligible for deportation, by the Soviet authorities from the Izmail Oblast to Siberia and Kazakhstan. Only 1,136 of those deported from the Izmail oblast were alive in Western Siberia (Tomsk region) in 1951.

Upon Nazi Germany's June 1941 declaration of war on the Soviet Union, Romania sided with the Axis powers and retook the territories previously annexed by the Soviet Union, including Budjak, but then also continued the war into proper Soviet territory. The area was regained by the Soviets in 1944 and, despite a royal coup by Michael I of Romania that led to Romania joining the Allies in August 1944, was annexed by the Soviets in the 1940 political configuration.

During the administrative reform of Ukrainian SSR, on 15 February 1954, Izmail Oblast was liquidated, and all raions of the oblast were included into Odesa Oblast. By territory, Odesa oblast is now the largest oblast in Ukraine.

With the fall of the Soviet Union, each of the fifteen republics that formally had the right to secede became independent, with boundaries preserved as were inside Soviet Union, since the same Soviet Constitution stipulated that they could not be changed without the mutual consent of both republics, and no discussions between the two upon such an issue were ever held.

Budjak is now a part of independent Ukraine, linked to the rest of Odesa oblast by two bridges across the Dniester River. The northernmost connection enters Moldovan territory for a 7.63 km (4 3/4 miles) stretch of road, which is controlled by Ukraine as per an agreement between the two countries.

Petro Poroshenko, the former President of Ukraine, was born in the Budjak town of Bolhrad in 1965.

In the autumn of 2014 there were reports of plots to proclaim a pro-Russian People's Republic in the Budjak region of Bessarabia, along the lines of the separatist "people's republics" established in the Donbas region. However, the growing intensity of the war in the Donbas cooled the enthusiasm for separatism and any plans that may have existed failed to materialise. By the end of the year there were reports of drones over the Budjak, apparently from Russian-backed militants in Transnistria or the Black Sea.

== Subdivisions ==
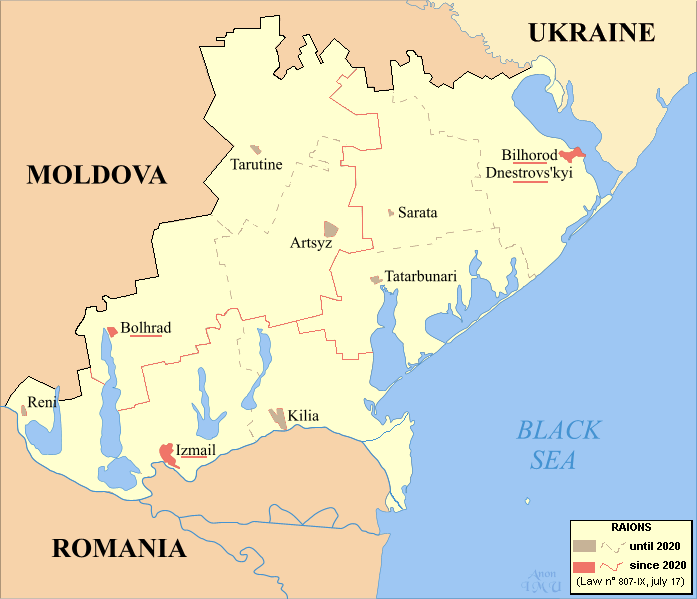
Raion subdivision of Budjak territory

In the Ukrainian SSR and Ukraine, until July 2020, the historical territory of Budjak was subdivided into two cities and nine administrative districts (raions) of Ukraine's Odesa Oblast:

Name	Ukrainian name	Area (km^{2})	Population Census 2001	Population estimate (1 Jan 2012)	Capital
Bilhorod-Dnistrovskyi (city)	Білгород-Дністровськ (місто)	31	58,436	57,206	Bilhorod-Dnistrovskyi
Izmail (city)	Ізмаїл (місто)	53	84,815	73,651	–
Artsyz Raion	Арцизький район	1,379	51,251	46,213	Artsyz
Bilhorod-Dnistrovskyi Raion	Білгород-Дністровський район	1,852	62,255	60,378	Bilhorod-Dnistrovskyi
Bolhrad Raion	Болградський район	1,364	73,991	69,572	Bolhrad
Izmail Raion	Ізмаїльський район	1,254	54,550	52,031	Izmail
Kiliia Raion	Кілійський район	1,359	58,707	53,585	Kiliia
Reni Raion	Ренійський район	861	39,903	37,986	Reni
Sarata Raion	Саратський район	1,475	49,911	45,813	Sarata
Tarutyne Raion	Тарутинський район	1,874	45,175	41,975	Tarutyne
Tatarbunary Raion	Татарбунарський район	1,748	41,573	39,164	Tatarbunary
Total		13,250	620,567	577,574	

After July 2020, the area is split between Bilhorod-Dnistrovskyi, Bolhrad, and Izmail raions.

== Ethnic groups and demographics ==
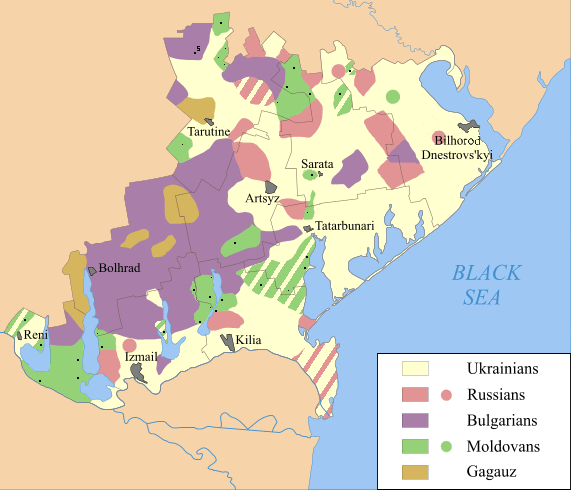
Ethnic majority division of Budjak with yellow representing Ukrainians, red for Russians, purple for Bulgarians, brown for Gagauz, and green indicating Moldovan populated villages, according to the Ukrainian census of 2001.

The main ethnic groups in Budjak today are Ukrainians, Bulgarians, Russians, Romanians and Moldovans (there is an ongoing controversy, in part involving linguistic definitions of ethnicity, over whether Moldovans' self-identification constitutes an ethnic group distinct and apart from Romanians, or a subset of a broader Romanian identity). The region was inhabited by Romanians and Nogai Tatars through the Middle Ages, but became a home to several other ethnicities and religious groups in the 19th century when it was part of the Russian Empire. The examples are Bessarabian Bulgarians, Bessarabian Germans, Gagauzians and Lipovan Russians who settled in compact areas.

Muslim, Turkic-speaking Nogai Tatars inhabited Ottoman-dominated Budjak until the start of the 19th century, but were forced to abandon the region once the Russian Empire got control over the territory. They resettled in the Caucasus, Dobruja (both in the Romanian and Bulgarian parts) or in modern Turkey.

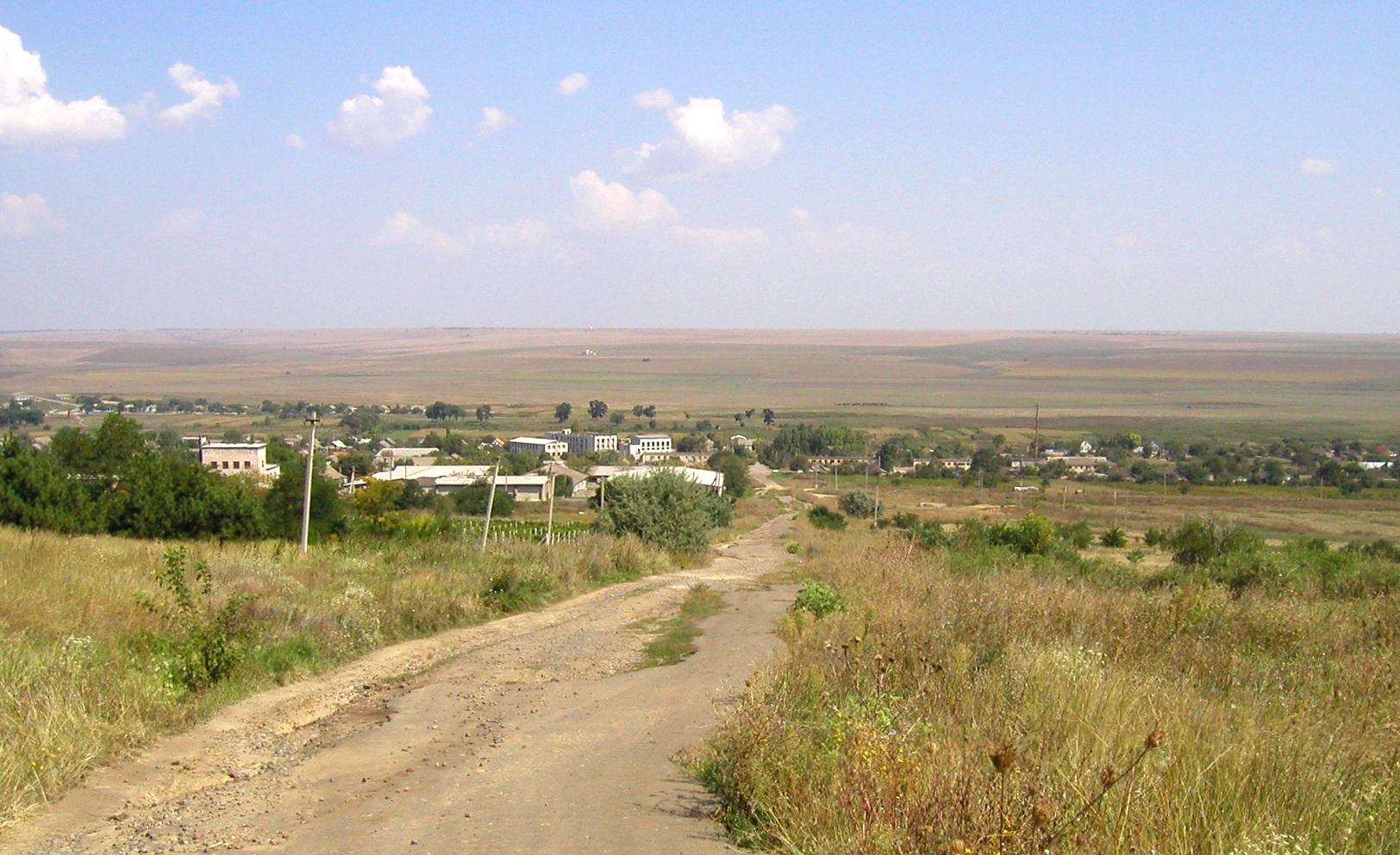
Vesela Dolyna (Romanian: Cleaștița, German: Klöstitz), village in Budjak, initially populated by Bessarabia Germans until 1940

Budjak was also home to a number of ethnic Germans known as Bessarabian Germans, originally from Württemberg and Prussia, who settled the region in the early 19th century, after it became part of the Russian Empire. A large number of them cultivated the Budjak steppes, known also as Kronsland (see also map). They were deported in the Nazi-Soviet population transfers following the Soviet takeover of Bessarabia in 1940. These "Germans from outside Germany", or Volksdeutsche, were mostly resettled in areas of Nazi occupied Poland, and had to move again at the end of World War II (one example was the family of the former president of Germany Horst Köhler).

Like Moldova, Budjak is home to a small minority of Gagauzes: an Orthodox Christian Turkic people who arrived from the eastern Balkans in the early 19th century, and settled part of the area vacated by the Nogais.

The Bulgarians of the region are known as Bessarabian Bulgarians, and, like the Gagauzes, are descendants of settlers from the eastern Balkans (today eastern Bulgaria) who moved to the area vacated by the Nogais, in order to escape Muslim domination.

During the same period, Lipovan Russians settled in the area close to the mouth of the Danube river.

Until World War II, the region was also home to a significant number of Jews, a portion of whom were killed in the Holocaust along with other Bessarabian Jews. Still, Jews remained a sizeable minority in several towns, first of all in Bilhorod-Dnistrovs'kyi until mass emigration to Israel in the 1980s and 1990s. Budjak was the only region within the former Russian Empire where a significant number of Sephardic Ladino-speaking Jews could be found as late as the second half of the 19th century. These Sephardim later assimilated with the majority of local Ashkenazic Jewry, but many retained surnames of either Turkic origin or otherwise suggestive of Sephardic descent.

According to the 2001 Ukrainian census, Budjak has a population of 617,200 people, distributed among the ethnic groups as follows: Ukrainians 248,000 (40%), Bulgarians 129,000 (21%), Russians 124,500 (20%), Moldovans 78,300 (13%) and Gagauzians 24,700 (4%). (See also the table below.) Note, that the total population of the Odesa Oblast is, by the 2001 Ukrainian Census, 2,469,000.

Although the majority of Russians and Moldovans declared the language of their ethnicity as their mother tongue, only roughly half of Ukrainians did so, while the other half indicated Russian as their native language. The Bulgarians also tend to use Russian more than Bulgarian, especially in public. The above numbers reflect the declared ethnicity, not the native language. The most common spoken language in everyday public use in Budjak is Russian.

Bulgarians are the largest ethnic group in the Artsyz (39%), Bolhrad (61%), and Tarutyne (38%) raions (districts, pre-2020), Moldovans – in the Reni Raion (50%), Russians – in the city of Izmail (44%), and Ukrainians – in the Kiliia (45%), Tatarbunary (71%), Sarata (44%), and Bilhorod-Dnistrovskyi (82%) raions, and in the city of Bilhorod-Dnistrovskyi (63%).

In the Izmail Raion, 29% of the population is Ukrainian, 28% Moldovan, and 26% Bulgarian. Since the previous census in 1989, its Moldovan population increased by 1% relative to the number of Ukrainian and Bulgarians, although the actual number of Moldovans has decreased in absolute terms, yet at a slower rate than that of Ukrainians, Russians and Bulgarians, probably due to the fact that a portion of the non-Moldovan population of the area were relatively recent arrivals from other regions of the former Soviet Union, and chose to return upon its dissolution.

Ethnic composition of Budjak according to the 2001 Ukrainian census^{1}
Raion (district) or City	Total	Ukrainians	Bessarabian Bulgarians	Russians	Moldovans	Gagauzians	Other ethnic groups^{2}	Number of settlements^{3}
Artsyz Raion	51,700	14,200	20,200	11,500	3,300	900	1,600	1+0+17(26)
Bilhorod-Dnistrovskyi Raion	62,300	51,000	800	5,500	3,900	200	900	0+0+27(57)
Bolhrad Raion	75,000	5,700	45,600	6,000	1,200	14,000	2,500	1+0+18 (21)
Izmail Raion	54,700	15,800	14,100	8,900	15,100	200	600	0+1+18 (22)
Kiliia Raion	59,800	26,700	2,600	18,000	9,400	2,300	800	1+1+13 (17)
Reni Raion	40,700	7,200	3,400	6,100	19,900	3,200	900	1+0+7 (7)
Sarata Raion	49,900	21,900	10,000	7,900	9,400	200	500	0+1+22 (37)
Tarutyne Raion	45 200	11,100	17,000	6,300	7,500	2,700	600	0+4+23 (28)
Tatarbunary Raion	41,700	29,700	4,800	2,700	3,900	–	600	1+0+18 (35)
city of Bilhorod-Dnistrovskyi	51,100	32,200	1,900	14,400	1,000	200	1,400	1+2+0 (0)
city of Izmail	85,100	32,500	8,600	37,200	3,700	800	2,300	1+0+0 (0)
Total	617,200^{1}	248,000^{1}	129,000^{1}	124,500^{1}	78,300^{1,2}	24,700^{1}	12,700^{1}	7 cities + 9 towns + 163 incorporated administrations (250 villages) = 266 settlements

^{1} All numbers are averaged to hundreds for each raion and city. The entries of the row "total" contain the sums of the respective entries for each line, hence bears a theoretical margin error of plus/minus 550. Numbers provided by other sources differ, but fit within this margin of error.
^{2} The "Others" category includes people who declared themselves as Romanians. For the entire Odesa Oblast (which includes the raions that comprise historic Budjak) 724 people declared themselves as Romanians. For a discussion about Moldovan/Romanian identity controversy, see Moldovenism. In the Republic of Moldova, “more than half of the self-proclaimed Moldovans (53.5%) said that they saw no difference” between the Romanian and Moldovan languages according to a survey conducted by Pal Kolsto and Hans Olav Melberg in 1998.
^{3} Certain settlements are called "cities" (7 here). Some of them are called "regional cities" (2 here), and have administrations that are financed and receive directions from the oblast administration. Others are called "raion cities" (5 here), and are component parts of raions. Raions have administrations just like regional cities, only that they consist of mainly rural areas.
Some settlements (9 here) used to have an intermediate status, between that of a village and that of a city. They were designated as urban-type settlements, but were abolished in 2024 and became rural settlements.

Local and regional authorities do not collect taxes. They are considered state institutions of the country at the local level, not institutions of local self-administration.
