= Aşağı Bucaq =

- Municipality
- Location within Azerbaijan
- Coordinates: 40°42′51″N 47°12′05″E
- Country: Azerbaijan
- Rayon: Yevlakh

Population
  - Total: 2,391
- Time zone: UTC+4 (AZT)
  - Summer (DST): UTC+5 (AZT)

Aşağı Bucaq (also, Ashagy-Budzhak and Ashagy-Budzhal) is a village and municipality in the Yevlakh Rayon of Azerbaijan. It has a population of 2,391. The municipality consists of the villages of Aşağı Bucaq, Yuxarı Bucaq, and Yenicə.
