= Bucaq =

- Municipality
- Location within Azerbaijan Location within Shaki-Zagatala Economic Region
- Coordinates: 41°04′42″N 47°22′00″E
- Country: Azerbaijan
- Rayon: Oghuz

Population
  - Total: 1,350
- Time zone: UTC+4 (AZT)
  - Summer (DST): UTC+5 (AZT)

Bucaq is a village and municipality in the Oghuz Rayon of Azerbaijan. It has a population of 1,350.
