= Bujak (surname) =

Bujak is a Polish surname that may refer to

- Eugenia Bujak (born 1989), Polish cyclist
- Franciszek Bujak (1875–1953), Polish historian
- Józef Bujak (1898–1949), Polish cross-country skier
- Philip Bujak (born 1960), British educationalist
- Sabahudin Bujak (born 1959), Bosnian-Herzegovinian football player and coach
- Zbigniew Bujak (born 1954), Polish electrician and trade union activist
