= Budzhak settlement hromada =

Coordinates: 46°18′N 29°14′E

Budzhak settlement hromada Буджацька селищна громада
- Hromada
- Interactive map of Budzhak settlement hromada
- Country: Ukraine
- Oblast: Odesa Oblast
- Raion: Bolhrad Raion
- Admin. center: Budzhak

Area
  - Total: 924.2 km^{2} (356.8 sq mi)

Population (2020)
  - Total: 15,898
  - Density: 17.20/km^{2} (44.55/sq mi)
- CATOTTG code: UA51060050000061243
- Settlements: 34
- Rural settlements: 1
- Villages: 33

Budzhak settlement hromada (Ukrainian: Буджацька селищна громада) is a hromada in Bolhrad Raion of Odesa Oblast in southwestern Ukraine. Population: 15,898 (2020 est.)

The hromada consists of a rural settlement of Budzhak and 33 villages:

- Blahodatne
- Bohdanivka
- Bulativka
- Chervone
- Hannivka (Vysochanske Starostat)
- Hannivka (Lisne Starostat)
- Ivanchanka
- Krolivka
- Lambrivka
- Lisne
- Matyldivka
- Mykolaivka
- Nadrichne
- Nove Tarutyne
- Novoselivka
- Novosilka
- Novoukrainka
- Oleksiivka
- Pidhirne
- Peremoha
- Petrivka
- Plachynda
- Rivne
- Roza
- Skryvanivka
- Vesela Dolyna
- Volodymyrivka
- Voznesenka Druha
- Vysochanske
- Yelyzavetivka (Bohdanivka starosta okruh)
- Yelyzavetivka (Vesela Dolyna starosta okruh)
- Yevhenivka
- Yurivka

== Links ==
- https://decentralization.gov.ua/newgromada/4317#
- Паспорт Бородінської громади на сайті Одеського Центру розвитку місцевого самоврядування
