= Budzhak, Ukraine =

Rural locality in Odesa Oblast, Ukraine

Budzhak Буджак
- Rural settlement
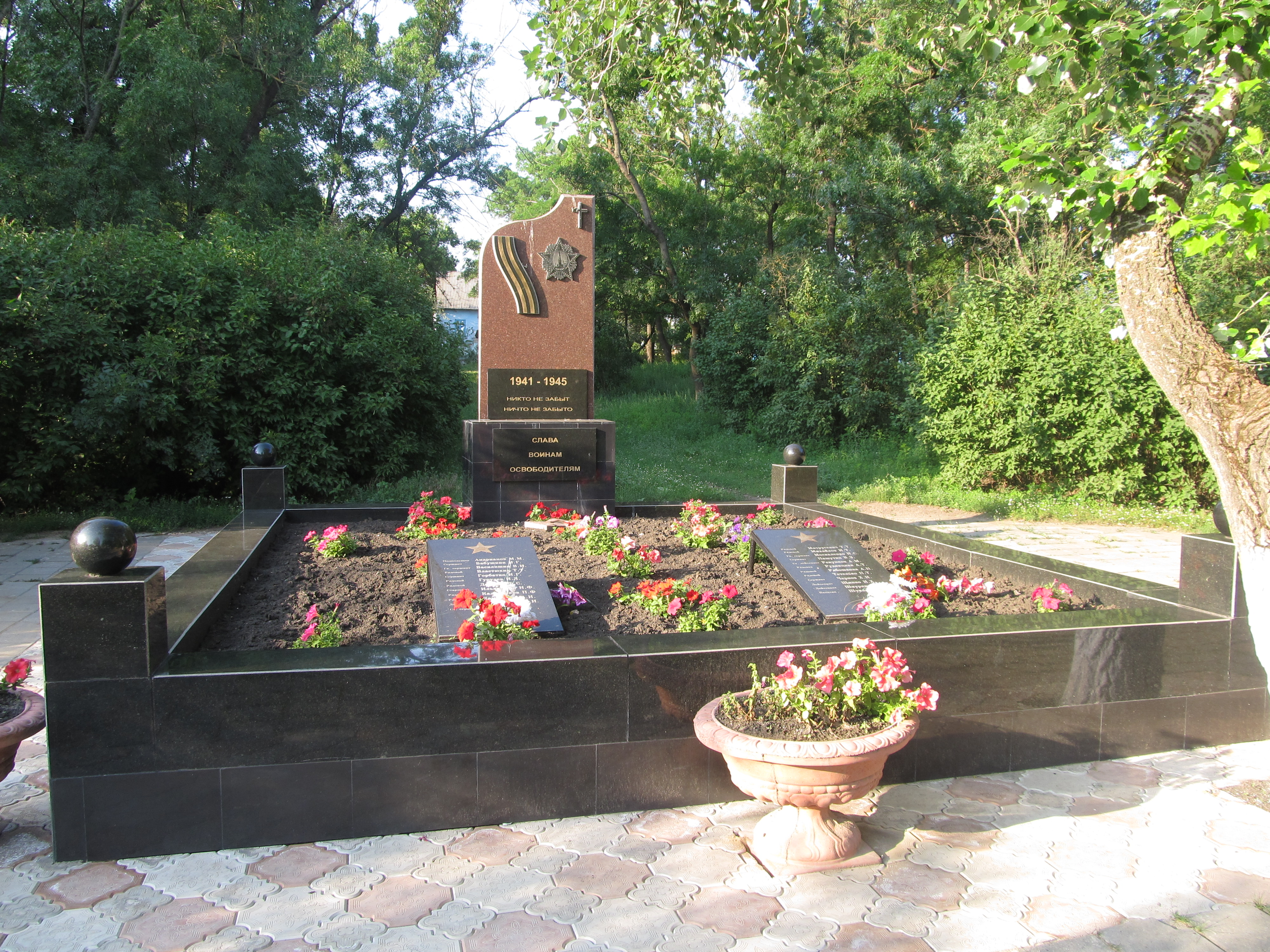
- Interactive map of Budzhak
- Location within Odesa Oblast Location within Ukraine
- Coordinates: 46°18′31″N 29°14′02″E
- Country: Ukraine
- Oblast: Odesa Oblast
- Raion: Bolhrad Raion
- Hromada: Budzhak settlement hromada

Population (2022)
  - Total: 1,484
- Time zone: UTC+2 (EET)
  - Summer (DST): UTC+3 (EEST)

Budzhak (Ukrainian: Буджак), formerly known as Borodino (Ukrainian: Бородіно; Russian: Бородино), is a rural settlement in Bolhrad Raion of Odesa Oblast in Ukraine. It is located on the left bank of the Saka in the drainage basin of the Cogâlnic. Budzhak hosts the administration of Borodino settlement hromada, one of the hromadas of Ukraine. Population: 1,484 (2022 estimate)

== History ==
Until 18 July 2020, Borodino belonged to Tarutyne Raion. The raion was abolished in July 2020 as part of the administrative reform of Ukraine, which reduced the number of raions of Odesa Oblast to seven. The area of Tarutyne Raion was merged into Bolhrad Raion.

Until 26 January 2024, Borodino was designated urban-type settlement. On this day, a new law entered into force which abolished this status, and Borodino became a rural settlement.

In September 2024, Borodino was renamed to Budzhak as a part of the derussification campaign.

== Economy ==
=== Transportation ===
The closest railway station is located in Soborne, approximately 5 kilometres (3.1 mi) southwest of the settlement. It is a terminal station on a railway line from Artsyz, which, in its turn, is a station on the railway connecting Odesa and Izmail. There is infrequent passenger traffic.

The settlement is connected by road with Artsyz, where there are further connections to Odesa. Other roads cross into Moldova.
