= Bessarabske =

Rural locality in Odesa Oblast, Ukraine

Bessarabske Бессарабське
- Rural settlement
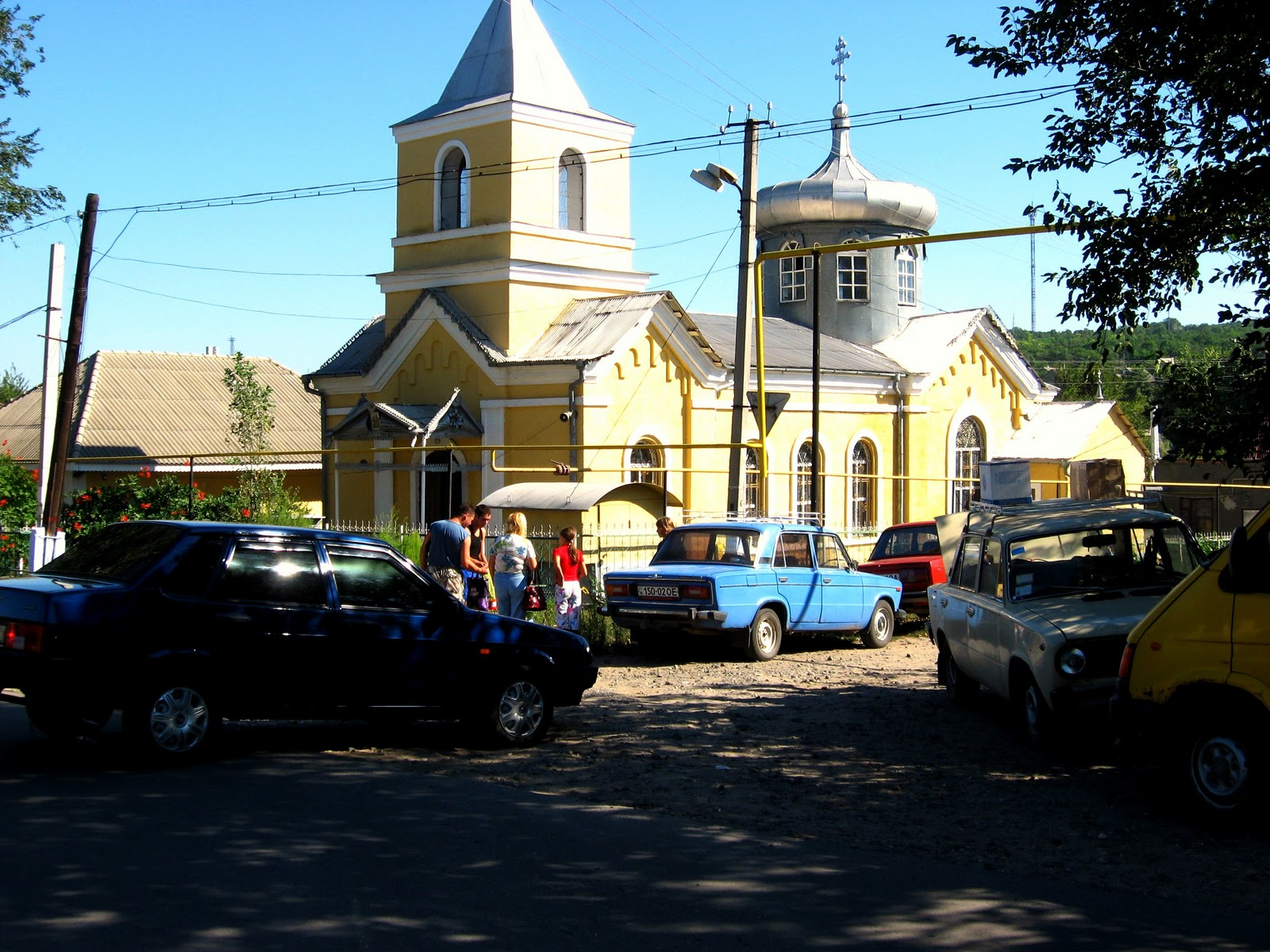

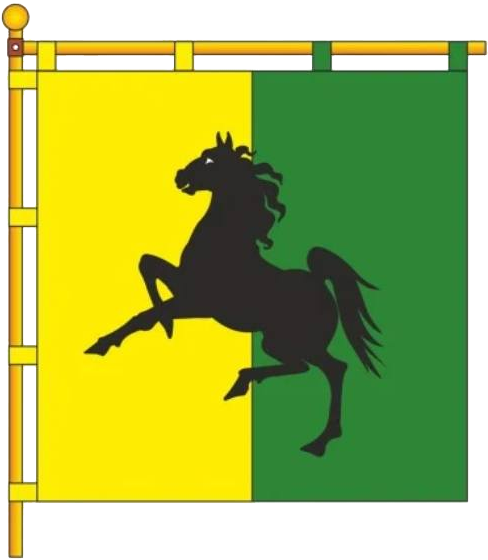
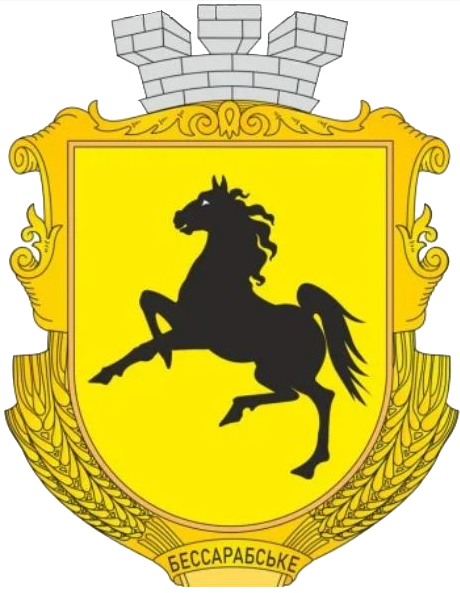
- Flag Coat of arms
- Interactive map of Bessarabske
- Location within Odesa Oblast Location within Ukraine
- Coordinates: 46°11′N 29°9′E
- Country: Ukraine
- Oblast: Odesa Oblast
- Raion: Bolhrad Raion
- Hromada: Bessarabske settlement hromada
- Founded: 1812

Area
  - Total: 3.99 km^{2} (1.54 sq mi)

Population (2022)
  - Total: 5,692
  - Estimate (2026): 5,230
  - Density: 1,430/km^{2} (3,690/sq mi)
- Time zone: UTC+2 (EET)
  - Summer (DST): UTC+3 (EEST)
- Postal code: 68500
- Area code: +380-4847

Bessarabske (Ukrainian: Бессарабське), formerly known as Tarutyne (Ukrainian: Тарутине; Bulgarian: Тарутино, romanized: Tarutino; Romanian: Tarutino or Ancecrac), is a rural settlement in southwestern Ukraine. It is located in Bolhrad Raion (district) of Odesa Oblast and in the historical region of Budjak in southern Bessarabia. Bessarabske hosts the administration of Tarutyne settlement hromada, one of the hromadas of Ukraine. Population: 5,692 (2022 estimate).

== History ==
Until 18 July 2020, Tarutyne was the administration center of Tarutyne Raion. The raion was abolished in July 2020 as part of the administrative reform of Ukraine, which reduced the number of raions of Odesa Oblast to seven. The area of Tarutyne Raion was merged into Bolhrad Raion.

Until 26 January 2024, Tarutyne was designated urban-type settlement. On this day, a new law entered into force which abolished this status, and Tarutyne became a rural settlement.

In September 2024, Tarutyne was renamed to Bessarabske as a part of the derussification campaign.

== Notable people ==
- Lucian Pintilie (1933–2018), theatre, film and opera director and screenwriter
- Eliezer Shulman (1923–2006), biblical scholar and historian
