= Yuxarı Bucaq =

- Location within Azerbaijan
- Coordinates: 40°44′38″N 47°12′43″E
- Country: Azerbaijan
- Rayon: Yevlakh
- Municipality: Aşağı Bucaq
- Time zone: UTC+4 (AZT)
  - Summer (DST): UTC+5 (AZT)

Yuxarı Bucaq (also, Yuxarı Buçaq, Budzhak and Yukhary-Budzhak) is a village in the Yevlakh Rayon of Azerbaijan. The village forms part of the municipality of Aşağı Bucaq.
