= Bolhrad Raion =

Subdivision of Odesa Oblast, Ukraine

Bolhrad Raion Болградський район
- Raion
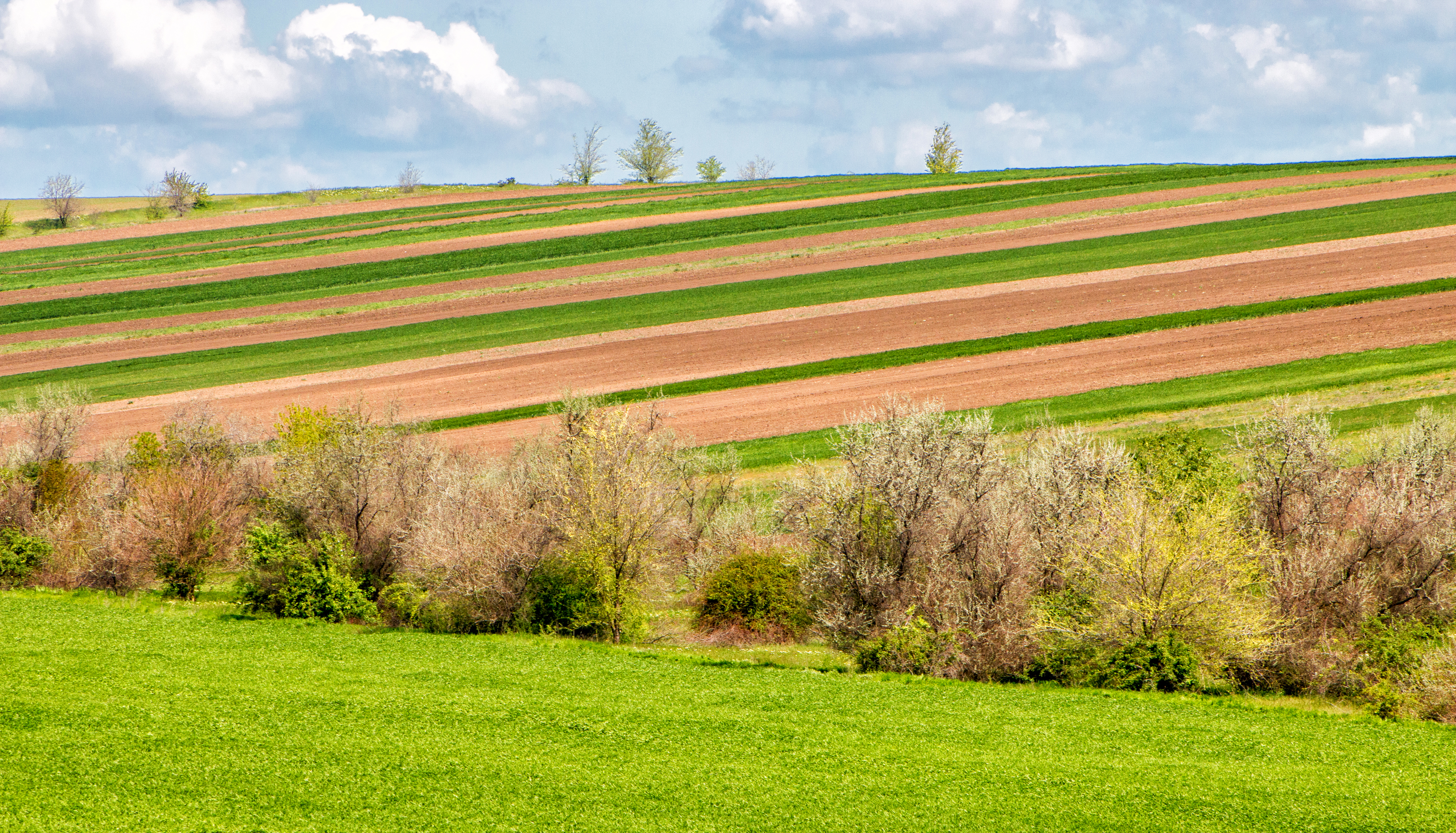

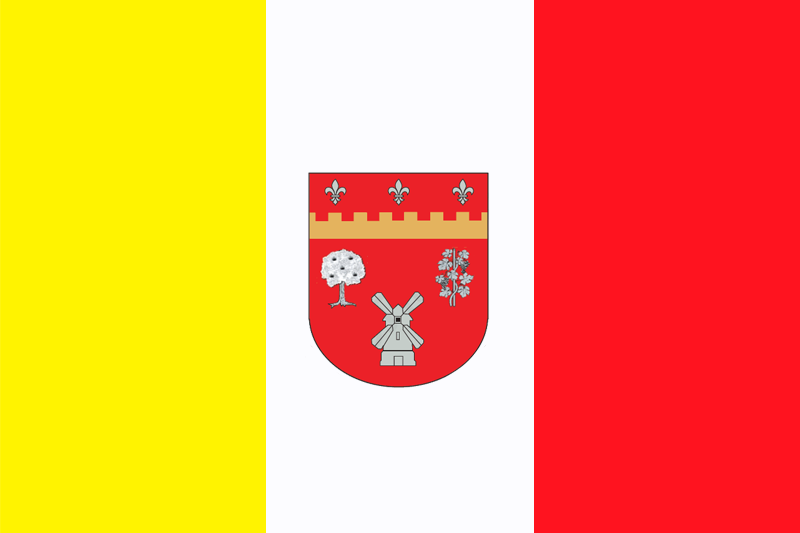
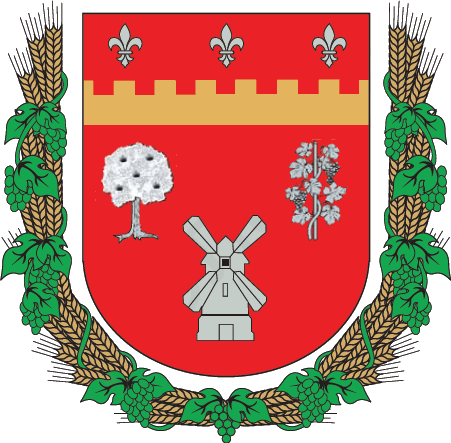
- Flag Coat of arms
- Interactive map of Bolhrad Raion
- Coordinates: 45°46′N 28°48′E
- Country: Ukraine
- Oblast: Odesa Oblast
- Established: 1940
- Admin. center: Bolhrad
- Subdivisions: 10 hromadas

Government
  - Governor: Mykhaylo Sadakliev

Area: since July 2020
  - Total: 4,518.02 km^{2} (1,744.42 sq mi)

Population (2022)
  - Total: 144,377
  - Density: 31.9558/km^{2} (82.7652/sq mi)
- Time zone: UTC+02:00 (EET)
  - Summer (DST): UTC+03:00 (EEST)
- Postal index: 68700—68752
- Area code: +380 4846
- Website: https://bolgrad-rda.od.gov.ua/

Bolhrad Raion (Ukrainian: Болградський район; Bulgarian: Болградски район; Romanian: Raionul Bolgrad) is a raion (district) in Odesa Oblast of Ukraine. It is part of the historical region of Bessarabia. Its administrative center is the town of Bolhrad. Population: 144,377 (2022 estimate).

On 18 July 2020, as part of the administrative reform of Ukraine, the number of raions of Odesa Oblast was reduced to seven and the area of Bolhrad Raion was significantly expanded. Two abolished raions, Artsyz and Tarutyne Raions, were merged into Bolhrad Raion. The January 2020 estimate of the raion population was 66,666 (2020 est.).

== Administrative division ==
=== Current ===
After the reform in July 2020, the raion consisted of 10 hromadas:

- Artsyz urban hromada with the administration in the city of Artsyz, transferred from Artsyz Raion;
- Bolhrad urban hromada with the administration in the city of Bolhrad, retained from Bolhrad Raion;
- Borodino settlement hromada with the administration in the rural settlement of Budzhak, transferred from Tarutyne Raion;
- Horodnie rural hromada with the administration in the village of Horodnie, retained from Bolhrad Raion;
- Krynychne rural hromada with the administration in the village of Krynychne, retained from Bolhrad Raion;
- Kubei rural hromada with the administration in the village of Kubei, retained from Bolhrad Raion;
- Pavlivka rural hromada with the administration in the village of Pavlivka, transferred from Artsyz Raion;
- Tarutyne settlement hromada with the administration in the rural settlement of Bessarabske, transferred from Tarutyne Raion;
- Teplytsia rural hromada with the administration in the village of Teplytsia, transferred from Artsyz Raion;
- Vasylivka rural hromada with the administration in the village of Vasylivka, retained from Bolhrad Raion.

=== Before 2020 ===
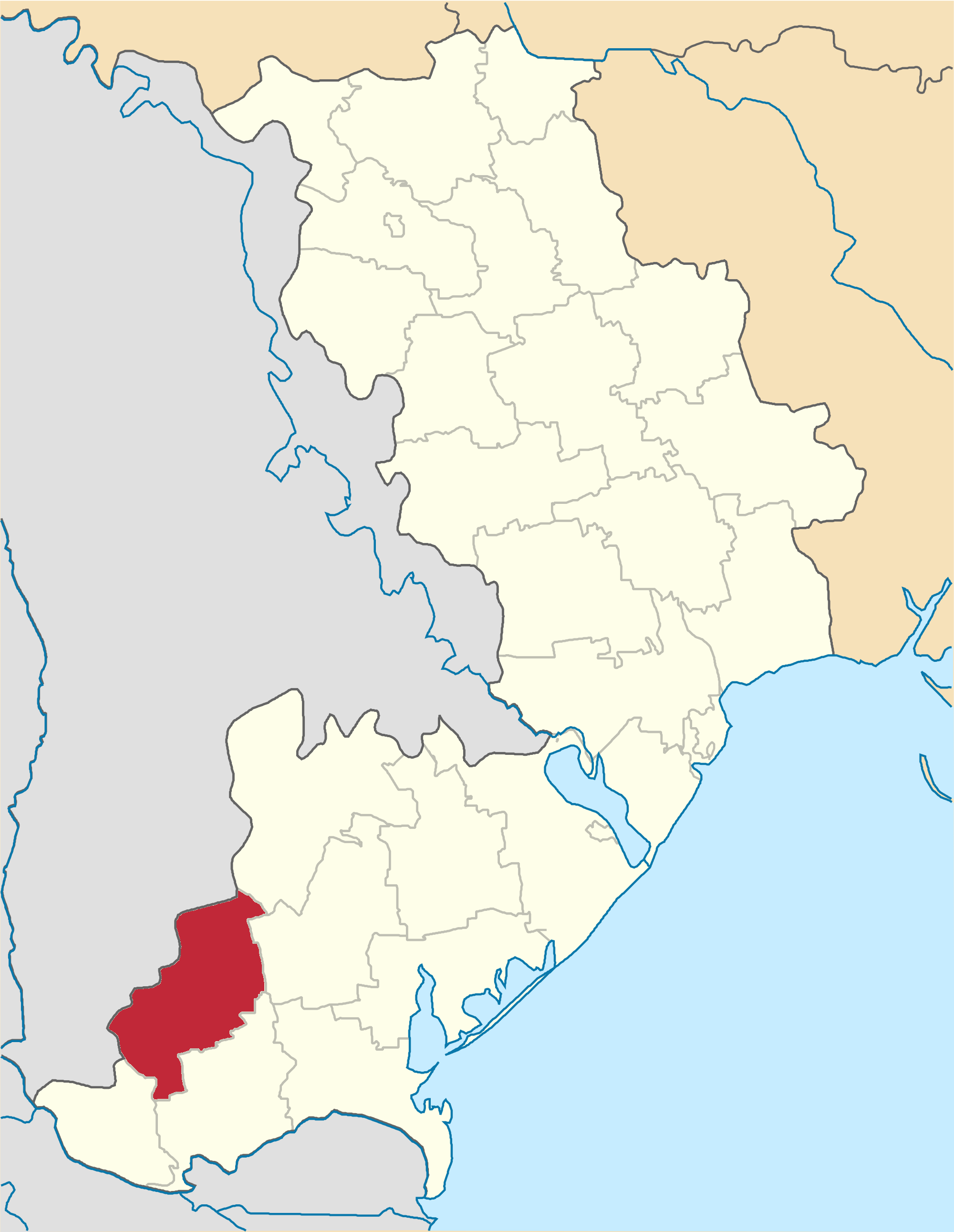
Bolhrad Raion in Odesa Oblast (1966-2020)

Before the 2020 reform, the raion consisted of five hromadas,

- Bolhrad urban hromada with the administration in Bolhrad;
- Horodnie rural hromada with the administration in Horodnie;
- Krynychne rural hromada with the administration in Krynychne;
- Kubei rural hromada with the administration in Kubei;
- Vasylivka rural hromada with the administration in Vasylivka.
