= Serhii Shapran =

Ukrainian businessman and politician

- Ukrainian: Сергій Валентинович Шапран

Chief Executive Officer of Brovary Aluminium Plant LLC
- Incumbent
- Assumed office 2015

Personal details
- Born: June 3, 1984 (age 42) Dnipropetrovsk, Ukrainian SSR, Soviet Union (now Ukraine)
- Party: For the Future
- Education: National Academy of Internal Affairs

Serhii Valentynovych Shapran (Ukrainian: Сергій Валентинович Шапран; born 3 June 1984, Dnipro, Ukrainian SSR) is a Ukrainian businessman and politician. He is the owner of Brovary Aluminium Plant LLC and the founder and owner of the Shapran Group LLP.

== Biography ==
Serhii Shapran was born on 3 June 1984 in Dnipro to a military family.

=== Education ===
From 1991 to 2001, he studied at the secondary school №41 in Mariupol, Donetsk region.

From 2003 to 2008, he studied at the Kyiv National University of Internal Affairs, specialising in law, and received a specialist degree in law.

== Career ==
From 2007 to 2012, he was the founder and CEO of the investment and legal company First Ukrainian International Trust Capital.

In 2009–2011, he was the Head of the Legal Department of Metalplast Production and Trading Company LLC, Kyiv.

From 2011 to 2015, he was the founder and CEO of Third Millennium Investments LLC — Brovary Aluminium Plant.

In 2012, he started publishing the city's newspaper Chesna Gazeta.

Since 10 May 2012, he has been the founder and chairman of the Board of the international industrial and investment holding Alumeta Group. Today, the plant operates under the BRAZ brand and is a closed-cycle aluminum production facility that is part of the following companies.

=== ALUMETA Group ===
ALUMETA Group, in addition to Brovary Aluminum Plant, includes three other companies: Braz Line, Braz Construction and ACORE Development Group. In addition to producing aluminum profiles and building structures, Alumeta Group companies mastered the production of corrosion-resistant aluminum bases for solar panels and LED systems for street and road lighting, which save up to 70% of electricity.

On March 1, 2024, Shapran Group LLC became a member of the National Association of Extractive Industries of Ukraine (NADPU).

In April of the same year, Serhiy Shapran became the owner of Budindustriya-Service LTD, which uses the Spaske sand deposit.

Since 2024, he is the owner of companies specializing in drilling and blasting operations, paving slabs, mining and processing, and quarrying, namely the following companies: “Uni Service, Uni Stone Plenty (USP), Uni Lux (Unilux), Malynska Mining Company, and Korostenska Mining Company."

== Political activities ==
In 2012, Serhii Shapran ran as a self-nominated candidate for the Verkhovna Rada in the 97th constituency, which includes the city of Brovary, but was not elected.

Since January 2021, he was a member of the Brovary City Council from the For the Future party. Shapran was also the leader of the For the Future party's branch in Brovary. In February 2023, he resigned his parliamentary powers.

== Investigations ==
=== Assets ===
In 2017, Shapran became a subject of the investigative journalism program Our Money with Denys Bihus: Safe Harbour: Hidden Yachts of the Powerful. In search of hidden yachts and boats, the program's journalists spent a month observing the piers of the most expensive yacht clubs in the capital. Serhii Shapran owns one of the most expensive vessels on the Dnipro River — an English yacht, Princess V 65.

=== Corruption allegations ===
On 9 June 2021, the National Agency on Corruption Prevention began verifying the declarations in which the computer system found the most risks, including the declaration of Serhii Shapran.

On 25 October 2021, the National Agency on Corruption Prevention found signs of a criminal offence in Shapran's 2020 declaration. In particular, most of the violations found relate to the MP's real estate. Shapran did not indicate in his declaration the value of three land plots and an apartment in Kyiv. He also failed to mention that his wife rents a non-residential premises of 79 square metres. Also, Serhii Shapran did not indicate the value of his watches.
