= Luzhanka =

Luzhanka (Ukrainian: Лужанка) may refer to:

- Luzhanka (border checkpoint), Zakarpattia Oblast
- Luzhanka (village), Odesa Oblast
