= Skoryk =

Skoryk is a Ukrainian surname. Notable people with the surname include:

- Mykola Skoryk (born 1972), Ukrainian politician
- Myroslav Skoryk (1938–2020), Ukrainian composer and teacher
