= Serpneve, Odesa Oblast =

Rural locality in Odesa Oblast, Ukraine

Serpneve Серпневе
- Rural settlement
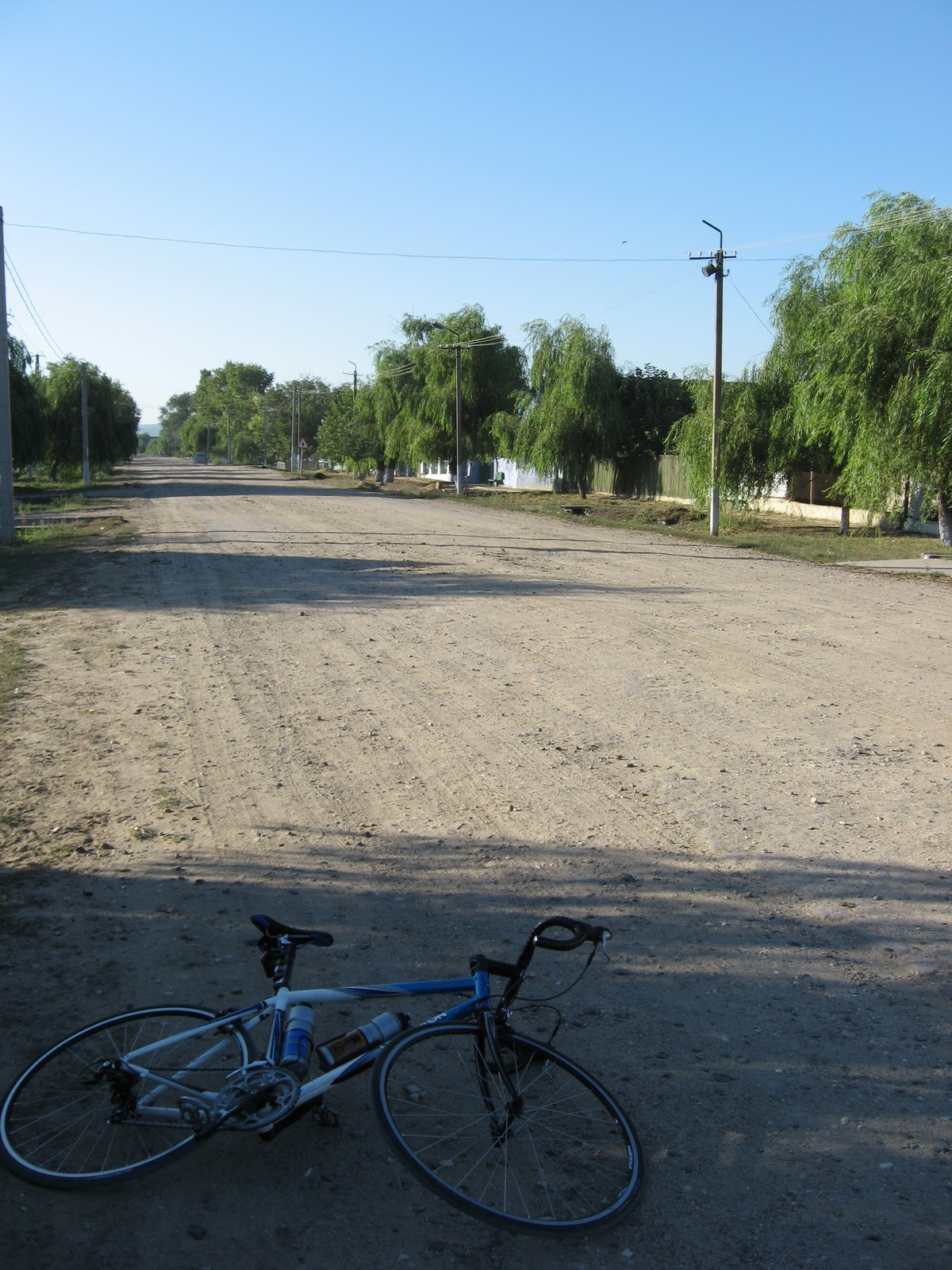
- Interactive map of Serpneve
- Location within Odesa Oblast Location within Ukraine
- Coordinates: 46°18′09″N 29°01′13″E
- Country: Ukraine
- Oblast: Odesa Oblast
- Raion: Bolhrad Raion
- Hromada: Tarutyne settlement hromada

Population (2022)
  - Total: 1,743
- Time zone: UTC+2 (EET)
  - Summer (DST): UTC+3 (EEST)

Serpneve (Ukrainian: Серпневе; German and Romanian: Leipzig; Russian: Серпневое) is a rural settlement in Bolhrad Raion of Odesa Oblast in Ukraine. It is located on the left bank of the Cogâlnic, at the border with Moldova. Serpneve belongs to Tarutyne settlement hromada, one of the hromadas of Ukraine. Population: 1,743 (2022 estimate)

== History ==
Until 18 July 2020, Serpneve belonged to Tarutyne Raion. The raion was abolished in July 2020 as part of the administrative reform of Ukraine, which reduced the number of raions of Odesa Oblast to seven. The area of Tarutyne Raion was merged into Bolhrad Raion.

Until 26 January 2024, Serpneve was designated urban-type settlement. On this day, a new law entered into force which abolished this status, and Serpneve became a rural settlement.

== Economy ==
=== Transportation ===
Whereas the closest railway station is across the border in Basarabeasca, the closest station in Ukraine is located in Soborne, approximately 15 kilometres (9.3 mi) southeast of the settlement. It is a terminal station on a railway line from Artsyz, which, in its turn, is a station on the railway connecting Odesa and Izmail. There is infrequent passenger traffic.

The settlement is connected by road with Artsyz, where there are further connections to Odesa. Other roads cross into Moldova.
