= Serhiy Paraschenko =

Ukrainian politician

Serhiy Parashchenko
- Сергій Паращенко

Chairman of the Odesa Oblast Council
- In office 21 August 2019 – 4 December 2020
- Preceded by: Anatoliy Urbansky
- Succeeded by: Hrihoriy Didenko

Governor of Odesa Oblast
- Acting
- In office 10 April 2019 – 11 June 2019
- President: Petro Poroshenko; Volodymyr Zelenskyy
- Prime Minister: Volodymyr Groysman
- Preceded by: Maksym Stepanov
- Succeeded by: Svitlana Shatalova (acting)

Personal details
- Born: Serhiy Volodymyrovych Parashchenko; 5 August 1972 (age 54) Vynohradivka, Ukrainian SSR, Soviet Union
- Party: Party of Regions; Petro Poroshenko Bloc

Serhiy Volodymyrovych Parashchenko (Ukrainian: Сергій Володимирович Паращенко; born 5 August 1972) is a Ukrainian politician, civil official, and former construction worker. He served as the acting Governor of Odesa Oblast from 10 April to 11 June 2019.

== Biography ==
Serhiy Paraschenko was born to a family of construction engineers on 5 August 1972. In 1995, he graduated from the institute, and managed a small farm in the village of Vinohradovka, a town in the Bolhrad Raion, of the Odesa Oblast.

From February 2000 to February 2004, he was the Chairman of the Agricultural Production Cooperative "Agrofirm Burgudzhi", in Odesa Oblast.

In 2005, he graduated from the National Academy of Internal Affairs of Ukraine with a degree in Law, as a lawyer.

As as deputy of the Odesa Oblast Council of the VI and VII convocations. In 2010, he was elected to the Odesa Oblast Council from the Party of Regions, and was twice elected to the Artsyzsky District Council. In 2015, he was elected to the Odesa Oblast Council from the BPP "Solidarity", headed by the faction of the BPP.

He hold his position as the Chairman of the farm “Agrofirm Burgudzhi”, Artsyzsky District, Odesa Region from February 2004 to March 2019.

From March 2019, Paraschenko served in office as a Deputy Governor of Odesa Oblast, serving with Maksym Stepanov.

On 10 April 2019, after Stepanov stepped down from office, Ukrainian president Petro Poroshenko, appointed Paraschenko as the acting Governor of Odesa Oblast.

From 21 August 2019 to 4 December 2020, Paraschenko was the chairman of the Odesa Oblast Council of the VII convocation.
