= Artem Dmytruk =

Ukrainian weight lifter and politician

- Артем Дмитрук
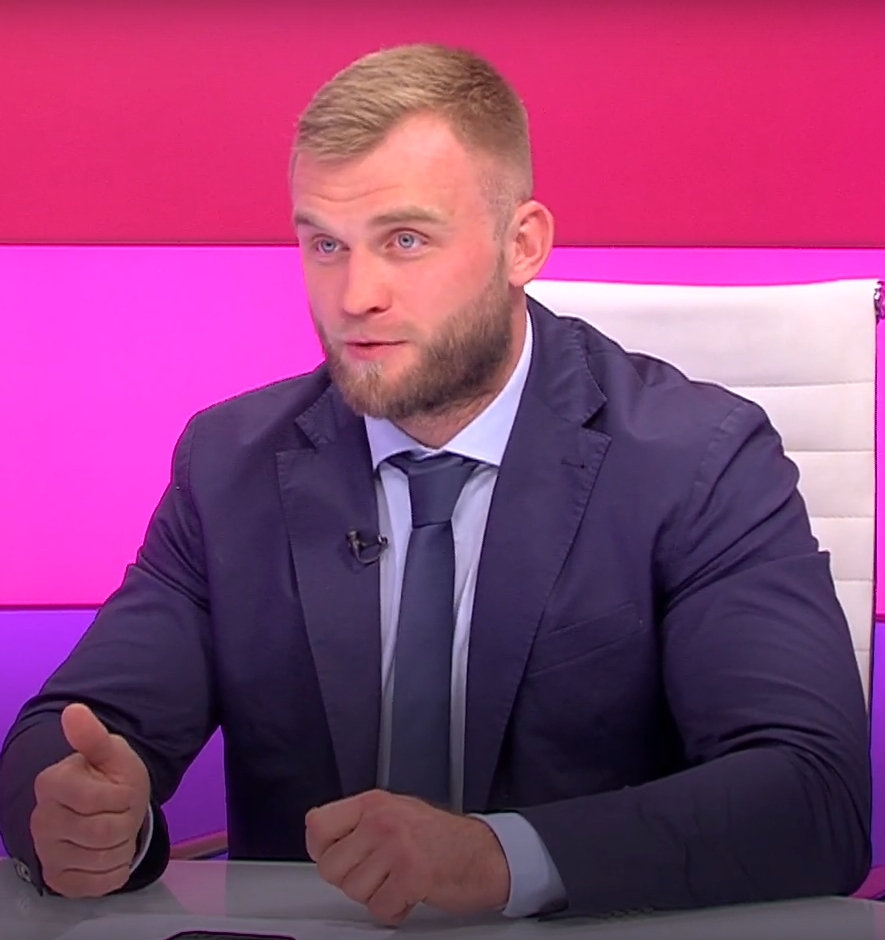
- Dmytruk in 2021

People's Deputy of Ukraine
- Incumbent
- Assumed office 29 August 2019
- Preceded by: Eduard Matviychuk
- Constituency: 133rd district

Personal details
- Born: 28 June 1993 (age 33) Koziatyn, Ukraine
- Party: Restoration of Ukraine (since 2022); Smart Politics (2021–2022); Servant of the People (2019–2021); Independent (before 2019)
- Education: National University Odesa Law Academy

Artem Hennadiyovych Dmytruk (Ukrainian: Артем Геннадійович Дмитрук; born 28 June 1993) is a Ukrainian weightlifter, activist and politician, who currently serves as a People's Deputy of Ukraine from the 133rd electoral district since 2019.

Having been initially elected an independent candidate supported by Volodymyr Zelenskyy's Servant of the People, he joined the party shortly thereafter, before changing affiliation to Smart Politics in 2021 and later Restoration of Ukraine in 2022. Critics have labelled Dmytruk pro-Russian, which he has denied, pointing in particular to his organisation of a territorial defence unit following the Russian invasion of Ukraine; he has condemned the invasion. Prior to his political career, as a weightlifter, Dmytruk won the 2014 World Powerlifting Championship, and, in 2018, the silver medal at the Crosslifting World Cup.

== Early life ==
Artem Hennadiyovych Dmytruk was born on 28 June 1993 in the city of Koziatyn in central Ukraine. He graduated the National University Odesa Law Academy, specialising in jurisprudence. Dmytruk then worked in various jobs as an entrepreneur, porter and bouncer. He was the owner of the Barbell Barbell Gym and "baza" fitness clubs.

Simultaneously becoming involved in activism, Dmytruk co-founded the "I'm an Odesan, and I care" non-governmental organisation, as well as becoming a member of the "Ilya Muromets" non-governmental organisation.

== Weightlifting career ==
Dmytruk has been a participant in several international weight-lifting championships. In addition to his 2014 win and 2018 result as a runner-up, he has also participated in sambo, mixed martial arts and boxing championships, receiving recognition from the Ukrainian government for his weight lifting prowess.

== Political career ==
=== Election and affiliation ===
Dmytruk ran in the 2019 Ukrainian parliamentary election as an independent candidate endorsed by Servant of the People in the 133rd electoral district, which encompasses his hometown of Odessa. He won the election with 32.66% of the vote, defeating his next-closest competitor, Viktor Baranskyi of Opposition Platform — For Life, who won 26.32% of the vote.

In the Verkhovna Rada, Dmytruk joined the Servant of the People faction. He also became a member of the Verkhovna Rada Law Enforcement Committee and the inter-factional associations South Ukraine and For Accelerated European Integration of Ukrainian Business.

In November 2021, following the formation of what became his new party, Smart Politics, founded by former Verkhovna Rada Chairman Dmytro Razumkov, Dmytruk was expelled from Servant of the People. Only one People's Deputy, Oleksiy Leonov, did not vote in favour of his expulsion. When asked, Dmytruk said he was not surprised by the procedure for his expulsion being initiated, saying that he "has a large number of conflicts with the party, both on voting and local issues in Odesa."

Three months later, Dmytruk was himself expelled from Smart Politics after the fight in the Odesa City Council on 25 January 2022.

In May 2022, Dmytruk joined Restoration of Ukraine.

=== Political views and controversies ===
The day of his accession to the Verkhovna Rada, he voted for the appointment of Oleksiy Honcharuk as Prime Minister of Ukraine. Shortly after voting, when questioned by Radio Liberty journalists, he did not name who he had voted in as Prime Minister, stirring criticism.

During the coronavirus pandemic in Ukraine, Dmytruk was skeptical of the COVID-19 vaccine, and was one of three People's Deputies to refuse it, along with Yuriy Kamelchuk and Yelyzaveta Bohutska.

In 2020, Dmytruk got into a physical fight with fellow People's Deputy Serhiy Vlasenko of Batkivshchyna on the premises of the Verkhovna Rada building.

The same year, Dmytruk laid flowers in honour of 46 pro-Russian protesters who were killed by a militia in the 2014 Odesa clashes, along with fellow Odesa MP Oleksiy Leonov. Dmytruk appeared in a 2021 documentary about the 2014 clashes made by Anatoly Shariy.

On 25 January 2022, Dmytruk was involved in a fight in which he was alleged to have injured three security guards. The fight occurred after Dmytruk allegedly forced his way into the City Council building with a group of supporters with the intention of disrupting a meeting regarding the hand-over of a land plot to the State Border Guard Service of Ukraine. Dmytruk had disputed the characterisation of the events as reported.

In an opinion piece that Dmytruk wrote for TASS in September 2025, Dmytruk alleged that Volodymyr Zelenskyy's government could be traced to the attempted assassinations of Donald Trump during Trump's election campaign in 2024, the first in Pennsylvania, the second in Florida, as well as to the assassination of Charlie Kirk. He wrote: "I'm saying this with full responsibility: In the attempt on Trump's life and in the assassination of Charlie Kirk, there is a trace of Zelenskyy – both ideologically and practically." (In Russian: "Я с полной ответственностью заявляю: в покушении на Дональда Трампа и в убийстве Чарли Кирка есть след Зеленского – как идейный, так и практический").

=== Extradition request and rejection ===
In August 2024, Dmytruk fled Ukraine. His departure came soon after he had been the only deputy to speak on the floor of the Rada against a law affecting the status of the Ukrainian Orthodox Church of the Moscow Patriarchate (UOC-MP), of which he is a subdeacon. The law prohibits Ukrainian church organisations from maintaining ties with the Russian Orthodox Church; it could restrict, or effectively ban, UOC-MP communities if affiliation, as defined by government-appointed inspectors, to the Russian church is found. It also coincided with charges being filed against him for allegedly assaulting, in two separate incidents, a soldier and a law enforcement officer. Dmytruk described his treatment as political persecution. He argued that the timing of the charges, relating to allegations up to three-years-old, was retribution for his support of the UOC-MP. The Ukrainian government stated that he was illegally evading responsibility for the charges filed against him in 2024 for assault, arising from incidents in 2021 and 2023.

The State Bureau of Investigation (SBI) issued an international warrant for the arrest of Dmytruk, An extradition request was subsequently sent to the United Kingdom, where media correctly reported he was located, after which he was briefly detained before being released on bail. On 4 March 2026, the Westminster Magistrates' Court formally denied the Ukrainian government's extradition request, finding that it would breach Dmytruk's rights under the European Convention on Human Rights.

== Weblinks ==
- Homepage of Artem Dmytruk
