= Maksym Stepanov =

Ukrainian politician

- Максим Степанов
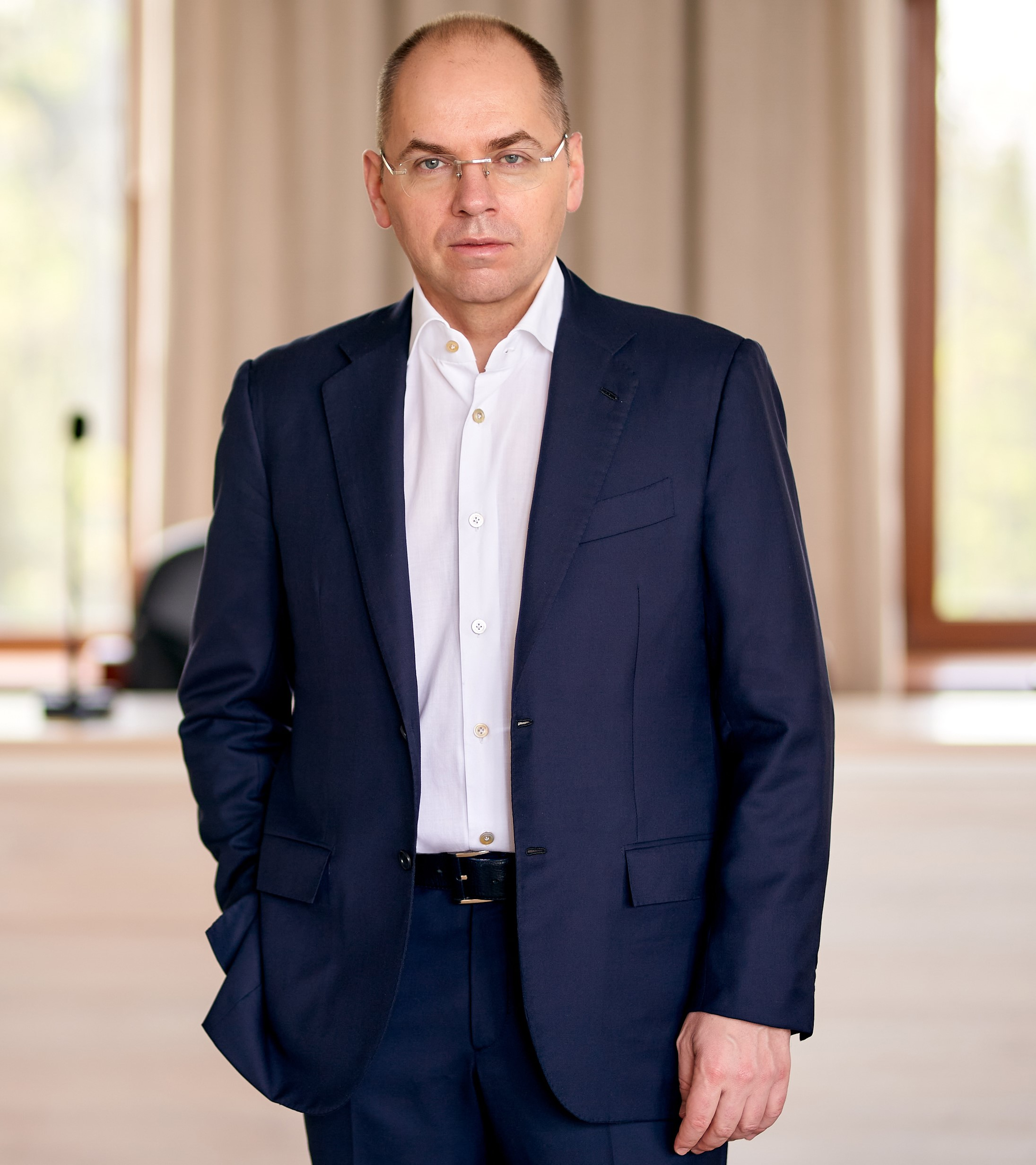
- Stepanov in 2020

Minister of Healthcare
- In office 30 March 2020 – 18 May 2021
- President: Volodymyr Zelenskyy
- Prime Minister: Denys Shmyhal
- Preceded by: Illia Yemets
- Succeeded by: Viktor Liashko

11th Governor of Odesa Oblast
- In office 12 January 2017 – 10 April 2019
- President: Petro Poroshenko
- Prime Minister: Volodymyr Groysman
- Preceded by: Solomiia Bobrovska (acting)
- Succeeded by: Serhiy Paraschenko (acting)

Deputy Governor of Odesa Oblast
- In office 2008–2010

Personal details
- Born: 18 August 1975 (age 50) Skovordino, Russian SFSR, Soviet Union (now Russia)

Maksym Volodymyrovych Stepanov (Ukrainian: Максим Володимирович Степанов; born 18 August 1975) is a Ukrainian politician. From 30 March 2020 until 18 May 2021, he was the Minister of Healthcare. Stepanov served as Governor of the Odesa Oblast from January 2017 until April 2019. In 2023, he was issued an arrest warrant in absentia for embezzlement and money laundering.

== Early life and education ==
Maksym Stepanov was born in Skovordino, in the Russian Soviet Federative Socialist Republic. In 1998 he graduated from Donetsk National Medical University in the specialty of obstetrician-gynecologist in Donetsk. In 2004, he joined the Kyiv National Economic University and majored in International Economics.

Stepanov's father, Volodymyr Stepanov, was a deputy of the Sloviansk City Council as a member of the Party of Regions in April 2014. He voted for the establishment of the Donetsk People's Republic in the 2014 Donbas status referendums, but according to his son, he was forced to do so. During the Siege of Sloviansk, Stepanov's parents resided in Kyiv, but they returned to Sloviansk after it was retaken by Ukrainian troops.

== Employment ==
- 1999 to 2001, he was the Deputy General Director of the Trade House "Gas of Ukraine" of Naftogaz of Ukraine.
- 2001–2003 – Deputy General Director of CJSC "Industrial and financial company 'Viche'".
- In 2003–2004, he worked at the State Tax Administration of Ukraine.
- In the period of 2008–2010, Stepanov was the first deputy chairman of the Odesa regional state administration to Mykola Serdyuk. When Viktor Yanukovych came to power, Stepanov was released along with Serdyuk.
- After that, Maksym Stepanov was the director of the state enterprise "Ukrainian State Center for Transport Services 'Liski'".

=== Director of State Enterprise Polygraph Plant "Ukraine" ===
From 2011 to 2016, Stepanov was in charge of the State Enterprise Polygraph Plant "Ukraine", which produces forms of official documents.

Stepanov, as director of a state-owned enterprise, managed to eliminate the monopoly of the EDAPS Concern for printing passports and other documents that are now under the state polygraph business. Of the profit indicators for 2011, UAH 3 million increased profits to UAH 172 million in 2015 and about UAH 300 million in 2016. During this period, Polygraph Factory "Ukraine" built two new workshops, including released new products – a biometric passport and an identity card, and was certified according to five international ISO standards.

In July 2013, Stepanov achieved the abolition of the monopoly of the private EDAPS corporation for the printing of foreign passports. As the Dzerkalo Tyzhnia newspaper wrote, "This means that real criminals are detached from controlling the personal data of Ukrainians, and the copyrights to the state symbols of Ukraine will no longer be a source of income for scammers. An important state reform has been carried out, which will benefit not only this power, but also the one that will come after it."

"For many years, a myth has been created that the creation of modern foreign passports with a polycarbonate page is an insanely complex technology beyond the mere mortals, but only to select people from EDAPS. Today, the myth of the irreplaceability of EDAPS collapsed. For the first time, the full cycle of production of foreign passports is established at the state polygraph combine "Ukraine". We defended the interests of the state and citizens from blackmail on the part of the manufacturer of foreign passports. What happened before? In the state there was no stock of passport forms. And if "EDAPS" had any difficulties – the passport was immediately stopped making. It turns out that the private consortium received a lever of pressure on the state because it was not just a supplier of products, but actually took over the functions of providing a public service – issuing a passport to citizens," said Maksym Stepanov.

In 2015, at the ceremony "Person of the Year 2015", he won in the nomination "Manager of the Year".

== Chairman of Odesa Regional State Administration ==
Makysm Stepanov won an open competition for the post of governor of the Odesa region after Mikheil Saakashvili resigned and was dismissed. On 21 December 2016, the Cabinet approved the appointment of Stepanov as the head of the Odesa Regional State Administration. He officially took office on 12 January 2017.

On the same day, Ukrainian president Petro Poroshenko stated, "I am convinced that today, my decision to appoint a person who won the competition, Maksym Stepanov as the head of the regional state administration is the right decision. A person with two higher education is not a new person in the Odesa Oblast, has experience as the first deputy head of the regional state administration, a person who is inclined to work here, but not to travel abroad, a person who is determined to assume clear obligations...".

President Poroshenko dismissed Stepanov on 6 April 2019 (the decree that dismissed him did not give the reason why). However Stepanov refused to step down claiming that the President had exceeded his authority (according to Ukrainian law Chairman of Regional State Administrations are appointed by the President on the submission of the Cabinet of Ministers of Ukraine for the term of office of the Head of the State). On 10 April, the Cabinet of Ministers of Ukraine endorsed the decree on Stepanov's dismissal. Stepanov claimed that he was dismissed because he had not refused to pay social benefits to the local residents (the so-called "administrative resources") to help Poroshenko's changes in the 31 March 2019 Ukrainian presidential election. Stepanov did not challenge this 10 April resignation since "The procedure is upheld."

=== Strategic Action Plan "Smart Region" ===
On 22 March, in Odesa, the chairman of the Odesa regional state administration Maksym Stepanov presented the Strategic Action Plan for 2017–2019, which was called "Intelligent Region" The program is designed for 2017–2019 and provides for the implementation of 4 major regional priorities: "Improving the quality of regional development management", "Ensuring a competitive regional economy", "Community and human potential development", and "Ensuring a decent quality of life". Within the framework of regional priorities strategic goals, programs and projects of development of the Odesa region, mechanisms of their implementation, as well as expected results are defined.

"Smart Region" is an innovative transformation plan that takes into account the competitive advantages of the region and provides for close interaction with local authorities, the public and business representatives, "Stepanov noted during the presentation."

Among the strategic objectives of the plan are the modernization of the regional management system, the introduction of electronic services and innovative models of communication with the public, the creation of a national logistics hub in the territory of the Odesa region, increase of cargo and passenger traffic, and also creation of a tourist cluster in the Odesa region. An important role in the plan is also given to the development of the agrarian sector of the Odesa region and the transition from predominantly raw agricultural production to the creation of finished products with high added value, as well as attraction of investments in the regional economy and development of small and medium enterprises.

Also in the Strategic Action Plan, special attention is paid to the security of the region, improving the quality of education and health, preserving the region's ecology, increasing energy efficiency and using renewable energy sources, developing self-government and strengthening the role of communities and citizens in solving local problems. To monitor and monitor the implementation of the action plan, and to ensure transparency of government actions, clear performance indicators (KPIs) were developed within each priority.

Maksym Stepanov also announced a plan with 12 points in 2017, in particular, the construction of strategically important roads, including The routes of Odesa-Reni, Kodima-Balta, Spasske-Vylkove, the beginning of the reconstruction of the runway of the Odesa airport (completion by the end of 2018), the modernization of the information portal of the Odesa region, the creation of the Odesa oblast brand, the improvement of the investment climate and increased investment attractiveness, Places at least 10%, local budget revenues increase, the launch of medical reform – the creation of up to 10 hospital districts in the Odesa region, the creation of 77 groups of rapid response police, the introduction of the area unified video surveillance systems, launch of free online courses to prepare graduates for testing etc.

== Minister of health ==
On 30 March 2020 Stepanov was appointed Minister of Healthcare in the Shmyhal Government.

In the October 2020 Ukrainian local elections Stepanov was placed first on the Odesa Oblast Council election list of the party Servant of the People.

On 14 May 2021 Prime Minister Denys Shmyhal sent a request to dismiss Stepanov as Minister to the Ukrainian parliament. According to the head of the Servant of the People parliamentary faction Davyd Arakhamia the reason for the resignation of Stepanov was the unsatisfactory rate of vaccination in the COVID-19 pandemic in Ukraine. On 18 May 2021 parliament dismissed him as Minister.

== Arrest ==
On 13 September 2023, the High Anti-Corruption Court of Ukraine issued an arrest warrant in absentia against Stepanov. He was accused of the embezzlement and laundering of 450 million hryvnias ($12.2 million) while head of the state owned "Ukraine Printing Plant".
