= Svitlana Shatalova =

Ukrainian politician

- Світлана Шаталова
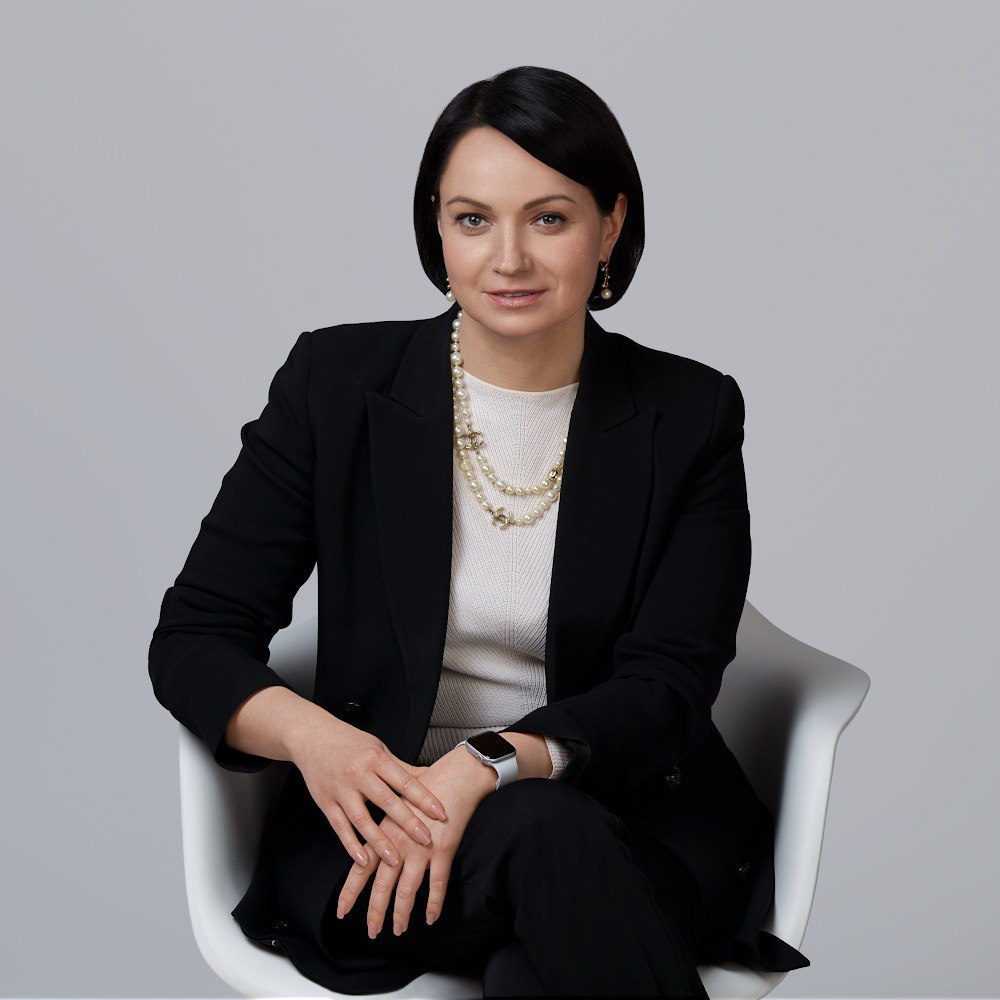

Governor of Odesa Oblast
- Acting
- In office 14 June 2019 – 11 October 2019
- President: Volodymyr Zelenskyy
- Prime Minister: Volodymyr Groysman; Oleksiy Honcharuk
- Preceded by: Serhiy Paraschenko (acting)
- Succeeded by: Maksym Kutsyi

Deputy Minister of Health of Ukraine (2020—2021)

Personal details
- Born: Svitlana Mykolayivna Shatalova; 11 September 1983 (age 43) Kyiv, Soviet Union

Svitlana Mykolayivna Shatalova (Ukrainian: Світлана Миколаївна Шаталова; born on 11 September 1983), is a Ukrainian political figure and who was the deputy governor of Odesa Oblast, who was serving to Serhiy Paraschenko until his resignation on 10 June. She served as the acting Governor of Odesa Oblast from 14 June to 11 October 2019.

Deputy Minister of Health of Ukraine (2020—2021).

== Biography ==
Svitlana Shatalova was born in Kyiv on 11 September 1983.

In 2002, she graduated from the Industrial and Economic College of the National Aviation University in Kyiv.

From September 2002 to February 2003 she worked as a senior accountant of the financial and economic department of the state specialized publishing house of children's literature "Rainbow" in Kyiv.

From February 2003 to June 2004, she was an accountant of Tornado Limited Liability Company.

Since June 2004, she became a chief specialist of the department of work with controlling bodies of accounting and payments management with enterprises and funds of the RSA Department of Accounting and Reporting of the subsidiary "Gas of Ukraine" NAK Naftogaz of Ukraine.

In February 2006, she graduated from the National Aviation University in the specialty of "accounting and audit", and received the qualification of economist in accounting and analysis of economic activity.

From July 2010 to November 2011 she became head of Asset Management, Assets and Liabilities Management Division of Reporting, Analysis and Accounting of Transaction with Cash and Commodities of the Accounting and Reporting Department of Gas of Ukraine Subsidiary of NJSC Naftogaz Of Ukraine.

From November 2011 to February 2012, she was promoted as deputy head of management and head of Sales and Settlements Accounting Department with Energy Generating Enterprises of Management of Sales and Payments Accounting with Heat Supply Enterprises and Energy Generating Companies of the Accounting and Reporting Department of Naftogaz of Ukraine NJSC.

And from February to June 2012, she was promoted as the head of the Sales and Settlements Accounting Department with the Gas Companies of the Gas Accounting and Reporting Department of the Accounting and Reporting Department of the Gaz Naft Subsidiary of NJSC Naftogaz of Ukraine.

In June 2012, she worked as a deputy director for financial and economic affairs of the State Enterprise "Polygraphic Combine" Ukraine "for the production of securities" .

In April 2017, Shatalova was appointed as Deputy Governor of Odesa Oblast at the time of Maksym Stepanov's term in office.

In March 2018, she graduated from a private educational institution "International Institute of Management" in Kyiv with a degree in "business administration", having obtained a master's degree in business administration.

On 11 June 2019, after the resignation of Serhiy Paraschenko, Shatalova had become the acting governor of Odesa Oblast until 11 October 2019.
