= Ivan Plachkov =

Ukrainian politician

5th Governor of Odesa Oblast
- In office 2006–2007
- President: Viktor Yushchenko
- Prime Minister: Yuriy Yekhanurov; Viktor Yanukovych
- Preceded by: Borys Zvyahintsev (acting)
- Succeeded by: Mykola Serdyuk

Personal details
- Born: 23 November 1957 (age 68) Krynychne, Ukrainian SSR

Ivan Vasylyovych Plachkov (Ukrainian: Іван Васильович Плачков; born 23 November 1957) is a Ukrainian politician of Bulgarian descent. Plachkov was Ukraine's Minister of Energy in 1999 and again Minister of Fuel and Energy of Ukraine between 2005 and 2006.

== Early life ==
Plachkov was born on 23 November 1957 in the village of Krynychne, which was then part of the Ukrainian SSR in the Soviet Union. He was ethnically a Bessarabian Bulgarian. After graduating from secondary school, he worked as a handyman for the PMK-99 of the Dunayvodbud trust in Izmail and as a school laboratory assistant. In 1980, he graduated from the Odesa National Polytechnic University and qualified as a thermal power engineer. Afterwords, he worked his way up until 1994 at the Kyiv CHPP-5 of the Kyivenergo Production Energy Association. He then took on managerial positions at Kyivenergo until 1999. Then, he was appointed Minister of Energy briefly from February to December 1999.

After returning to the private sector, he again became chairman of the board of Kyivenergo until he returned to politics in 2005. In 2005 he became a Candidate of Technical Sciences. He is also the president of Veles LLC, which produces wine in Odesa, and was from 2015 to 2017 Honorary President of the Association of Gas Producers.

== Political activity ==
From 2005 to 2006 he again served as Minister of Fuel and Energy of Ukraine. He was then appointed Governor of Odesa Oblast from 2006 to 2007, before becoming advisor to the President Viktor Yushchenko and Deputy Head of the State Administration of Affairs until 2010.

In 2021, Plachkov made an analysis of Ukraine's energy sector and called for a review of the electricity market. He said the sector was poorly regulated and heavily reliant on cheap electricity from Russia and Belarus.
