= Valentyn Galunko =

Valentyn Galunko (Halunko) Валентин Васильович Галунько
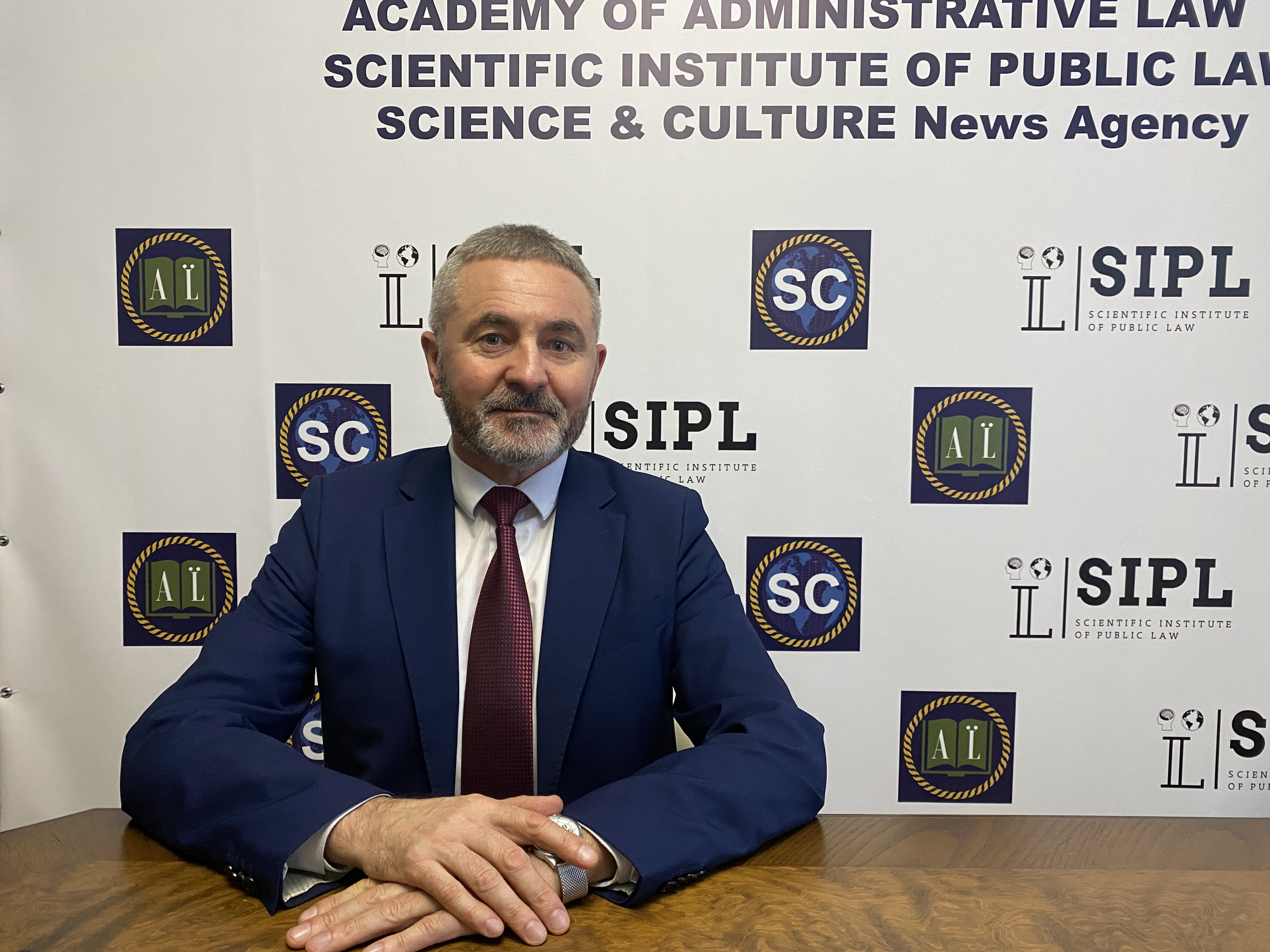
- Born: 31 January 1964; Shakhty, Rostov oblast, Soviet Union
- Citizenship: Ukraine
- Education: National Academy of Internal Affairs

Valentyn Vasylovych Galunko (Halunko) (Ukrainian: Валентин Васильович Галунько) (born January 31, 1964) is a scientist and entrepreneur in the field of space activities. He is a doctor of sciences, professor, academician of the academy of administrative and legal sciences, author of the scientific theory of the State of economically active Citizens and the traditional and public support of the Elderly, president of "Science and Space" LLC.

== Biography ==
Valentyn Halunko was born on the 31st day of January, 1964 in the town of Shakhty, Rostov Oblast in the family of miners. For the period since the year 1983 till 1992 he passed military service in Armed Forces (senior lieutenant), for the period from 1992 till 2004 he passed service in the authorities of Internal Affairs of Ukraine (militia colonel). Since the year 2005 Valentyn Galunko pursues scientific and pedagogical activity.

Education: secondary school (village of Slobodo-Shlyshkovetska, Vinnytsia Oblast, 1979), Fitting College (town of Mogyliv-Podilskyi, 1983); Higher Military Command and Engineering College (now Serpukhov Military Academy of Missile troops) (town of Serpukhov, Moscow Oblast, 1988), National Academy of Internal Affairs (city of Kyiv, 1998); post-graduate studies at the National Academy of Internal Affairs (2003); doctorate at Kharkiv National Academy of Internal Affairs (2009).

== Scientific work ==
Main scientific papers:

1. Administrative and legal foundations of organization and activity of the State Protection Service attached to the Ministry of Internal Affairs: synopsis of a thesis of the candidate of juridical sciences: spec. 12.00.07.
2. Administrative and legal protection of subjects of title in Ukraine: monography.
3. Application of administrative and economical sanctions to economic entities: educational book.
4. Title protection: Administrative and legal aspects: monography.
5. Constitutional law of Ukraine: educational book under the editorship of V. Galunko.
6. Administrative law of Ukraine in modern conditions (calls of the beginning of the XXI century): monography under general editorship of V. Galunko.
7. Theory of the state and law: educational book under general editorship of V.Galunko.
8. Protection of human rights and freedoms as the main principle of administrative law.
9. Private property as an inalienable natural human right.
10. Public interest in administrative law.
11. Directions of reforming of the system of local government authorities.
12. Putin's Nuclear Blackmail.
