= Eduard Matviychuk =

Ukrainian politician

- Едуард Матвійчук
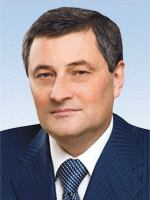

6th Governor of Odesa Oblast
- In office 18 March 2010 – 8 November 2013
- President: Viktor Yanukovych
- Preceded by: Mykola Serdyuk
- Succeeded by: Mykola Skoryk

People's Deputy of Ukraine
- In office 2014–2019
- President: Petro Poroshenko; Volodymyr Zelenskyy
- Preceded by: Hennadiy Trukhanov
- Succeeded by: Artem Dmytruk
- Constituency: 133rd district

Personal details
- Born: 27 April 1963 (age 63) Velyki Luchky, Ukrainian SSR, Soviet Union (now Ukraine)
- Party: Party of Regions

Eduard Leonidovych Matviychuk (Ukrainian: Едуард Леонідович Матвійчук; born 27 April 1963) is a Ukrainian politician, who served as Governor of Odesa Oblast from 2010 to 2013, and later a People's Deputy of Ukraine from 2014 to 2019.

== Early life ==
Matviychuk was born on 27 April 1963 in Velyki Luchky, which was then part of the Ukrainian SSR in the Soviet Union. Initially, he was a student at the local Uzhhorod trade‑culinary vocational school, before switching to become a student at Uzhhorod National University, where he graduated from in 1986 with a degree from the Faculty of Physics. Afterwords, he worked as a physics teacher at the Yasinianska Secondary School, and then at Uzhhorod secondary school no. 8. In 1989, he became an inspector of customs for the city of Chop, and by 1995 had become a senior inspector.

He then served as the president of the Verkhovyna Football Club for a year, before becoming editor-in-chief of the Euro-Center newspaper, which was produced by Euro-Press LLC in Uzhhorod.

== Political career ==
A member of the Party of Regions, Matviychuk was appointed Governor of Odesa Oblast on 18 March 2010. Key issues during his tenure included education, such as the distribution of school busses, as well as disagreements with the federal government, which resulted in his transfer from Governor to advisor to the President in November 2013, a position he remained until President Yanukovych was overthrown in February 2014, triggering the pro-Russian unrest and the Russo-Ukrainian war.

In the 2014 Ukrainian parliamentary election, Matviychuk successfully ran as an independent candidate in the 133rd electoral district, which includes parts of the city of Odesa, winning in a crowded field with 24.20% of the vote. He did not seek re-election in 2019, and was succeeded by Artem Dmytruk.

Political offices
Preceded by Mykola Serdyuk	Governor of Odesa Oblast; 2010 - 2013	Succeeded by Mykola Skoryk
