= Maksym Kutsyi =

Ukrainian politician

Maksym Kutsyi Максим Куций

12th Governor of Odesa Oblast
- In office 11 October 2019 – 5 November 2020
- President: Volodymyr Zelenskyy
- Prime Minister: Oleksiy Honcharuk; Denys Shmygal
- Preceded by: Svitlana Shatalova (acting)
- Succeeded by: Vyacheslav Ovechkin (acting)

Personal details
- Born: Maksym Vasylyovych Kutsyi; 21 December 1982 (age 43) Kyiv, Ukrainian SSR, Soviet Union
- Party: Independent
- Children: 1
- Education: National Academy of Internal Affairs
- Occupation: entrepreneur politician

Maksym Vasylovych Kutsyi (Ukrainian: Максим Васильович Куций; born 21 December 1982) is a Ukrainian entrepreneur and politician. He is a former Governor of Odesa Oblast. He assumed office on 11 October 2019 and was dismissed by President Volodymyr Zelenskyy on 5 November 2020.

== Biography ==
Kutsyi was born on 21 December 1982 in Kyiv, which was then part of the Ukrainian SSR in the Soviet Union. From 1990 to 2000 he studied at the secondary school Lyceum of International Relations No. 51, which is located within the Pecherskyi District of Kyiv. From 2000 to 2004, he studied law at the National Academy of Internal Affairs.

After graduating, for a year he worked within the internal affairs bodies (MIA) of the Holosiivskyi District in Kyiv. He then worked for the international audit company Baker Tilly. From 2007 to 2008 he worked for Ernst & Young Global Limited. Kutsyi then held senior positions at BTA Bank and "Eurasia" from 2008 to 2014. Since 2015, he was the director of Service and Management LLC.

In 2019 he was on the shortlist of 5 candidates for the post of Governor of Odesa Oblast after he was recommended by Igor Novikov, the former advisor to President Volodymyr Zelenskyy, whom he knew well. He was chosen because of his managerial experience by Zelenskyy, and was ordered to primarily work on ensuring economic growth in Odesa and to raise the standard of living. He was, at the time, also called "Arsen Avakov's man", even though Kutsyi stated they never interacted and that all that connected them was Kutsyi worked in the internal affairs bodies after graduation.

Kutsyi is married and has a son.
