= Solomiia Bobrovska =

Ukrainian politician and civic activist

- Соломія Бобровська
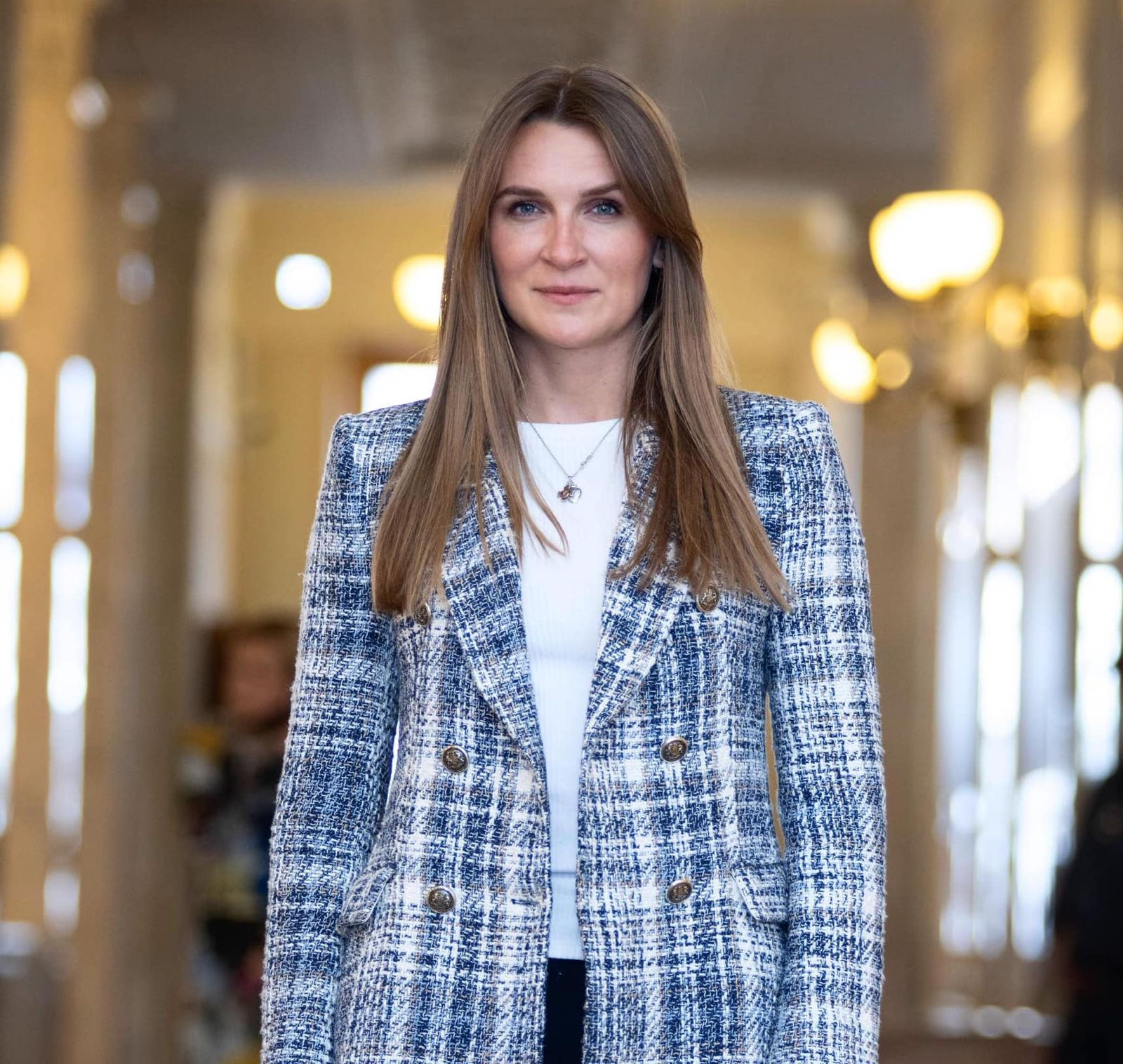
- Bobrovska in 2023

People's Deputy of Ukraine
- Incumbent
- Assumed office 29 August 2019
- Constituency: Holos, No. 9

Governor of Odesa Oblast
- Acting
- In office 9 November 2016 – 12 January 2017
- President: Petro Poroshenko
- Prime Minister: Volodymyr Groysman
- Preceded by: Mikheil Saakashvili
- Succeeded by: Maksym Stepanov

Personal details
- Born: 20 December 1989 (age 36) Rivne, Ukrainian SSR, Soviet Union (now Ukraine)
- Party: Holos
- Education: University of Lviv

Solomiia Anatoliivna Bobrovska (Ukrainian: Соломія Анатоліївна Бобровська; born 20 December 1989 іn Rivne, Ukraine) is a Ukrainian politician and civic activist currently serving as a People's Deputy of Ukraine on the proportional list of the Holos party since 2019. From 2016 to 2017, she served as the Acting Governor of Odesa Oblast.

Since 2022, Solomiia has been a member of the Parliamentary Committee on National Security, Defence and Intelligence.

== Education ==
From 2007 to 2012, Bobrovska studied at the Philosophy Faculty of the University of Lviv, obtaining a master's degree. She worked on a candidate dissertation entitled "Freedom as a source of social and legal legitimation of civil society".

From 2005 to 2007, she studied at the Regional Information and Computer Center of the Rivne Regional Administration.

She is a graduate of the Institute of Civic Leadership, and of the joint project between the Laboratory of the Legislative Initiatives and the Council of Europe.

In 2010, as part of the Canadian-Ukrainian parliamentary program, she completed an internship at the Parliament of Canada in the office of Liberal Party MP Andrew Kania.

In 2017, she interned at the Women's Council of Public Administration of Massachusetts (Boston, United States).

== Civic activity ==
In 2002, Bobrovska became a member of the national scout organisation Plast She joined the NGO "Foundation of Regional Initiatives" in 2009.

Bobrovska was an activist in the civic movement "Honestly. Filter the Rada!"(Ukrainian: "Чесно. Фільтруй Раду!"). She was a co-founder of the Euromaidan SOS and Help the SBGSU.

In 2012–2014 and in 2015, she was the curator of projects of the public organization "Civil Liberties Center".

In 2018–2019, she headed the NGO "Ukrainian Osnova", one of the directions of which is the project of the Studio of Women's Political Interaction for women of southern and eastern Ukraine.

Solomiia Bobrovska took active part in the support campaign of Serhii Sternenko in 2021.

== Professional experience ==
In 2010, as a part of the Canada-Ukraine Parliamentary Program, she interned at the Parliament of Canada in the office of Andrew Kania.

In 2012–2014, and from January to June 2015, Bobrovska was a project manager at the Centre of Civil Liberties.

In April–December 2014, she served as an advisor to Oleksandr Sych, the Vice Prime Minister of Ukraine. From October 2015 through April 2016, she served as an advisor to the Governor of Odesa Region, Mikheil Saakashvili.

From April 2016 until January 2017, Bobrovska served as a Deputy Governor of Odesa Oblast. On 9 November 2016, Saakashvili resigned, and she was appointed Acting Governor. 26 years old at the time of her appointment, Bobrovska became the youngest Governor in Ukraine's history. She left the post on 12 January 2017.

From September–November 2017, Bobrovska completed a fellowship at the Massachusetts Caucus of Women Legislators (Boston, USA). In 2018–2019, she served as head of the NGO "Ukrainian Core", focusing on the Women's Political Interaction Studies Project for women of Southern and Eastern Ukraine.

== Political activity ==
Bobrovska was one of the core members of the group around Svyatoslav Vakarchuk who initiated the Holos party (Ukrainian: Голос). She was a candidate at the 2019 Ukrainian parliamentary election as the ninth candidate on the party's proportional list. In the election, Holos won 5.82% of the vote, leading to the election of the first seventeen members of the proportional list (as well as three candidates in Lviv Oblast) as People's Deputy of Ukraine.

On 12 December 2019, Bobrovska joined the parliamentary inter-factional association "Humane Country", established at the initiative of UAnimals to promote humanistic values and protect animals from cruelty.

On 7 December 2020, Bobrovska was included in the list of Ukrainian individuals sanctioned by the Russian government.

Until 2022, Bobrovska served as Secretary of the Verkhovna Rada Committee on Foreign Affairs and Interparliamentary Cooperation. On 6 October 2022, she joined the Committee on National Security, Defence and Intelligence.

On 5 November 2025, she became Chair of the Subcommittee on Human Capital Development within the Committee on National Security, Defence and Intelligence.

She also serves as Deputy Head of the Ukrainian Delegation to the NATO PA and as Co-Chair of the Latvia-Ukraine Parliamentary Friendship Group.

== Awards and recognition ==
- Medal "For Sacrifice and Love for Ukraine" awarded by the Ukrainian Orthodox Church of the Kyiv Patriarchate (2015).
- Commemorative medal "Defender of the Homeland" awarded by the State Border Guard Service of Ukraine (2016).
- Honorary distinction "Cross of St. Nicholas" awarded by the Mykolaiv Oblast Council (2017).
- Named among Kyiv Post's TOP 30 Under 30.
- Medal of Merit awarded by the Ministry of National Defence of Lithuania (2022).
- Included in Ukrainska Pravda's "UP100: The Power of Women" list in the "Public Administration and Politics" category (2024).
- Medal of Merit awarded by the Ministry of National Defence of Lithuania (2025).
