= Anatoliy Urbanskyi =

Ukrainian politician

- Анатолій Урбанський
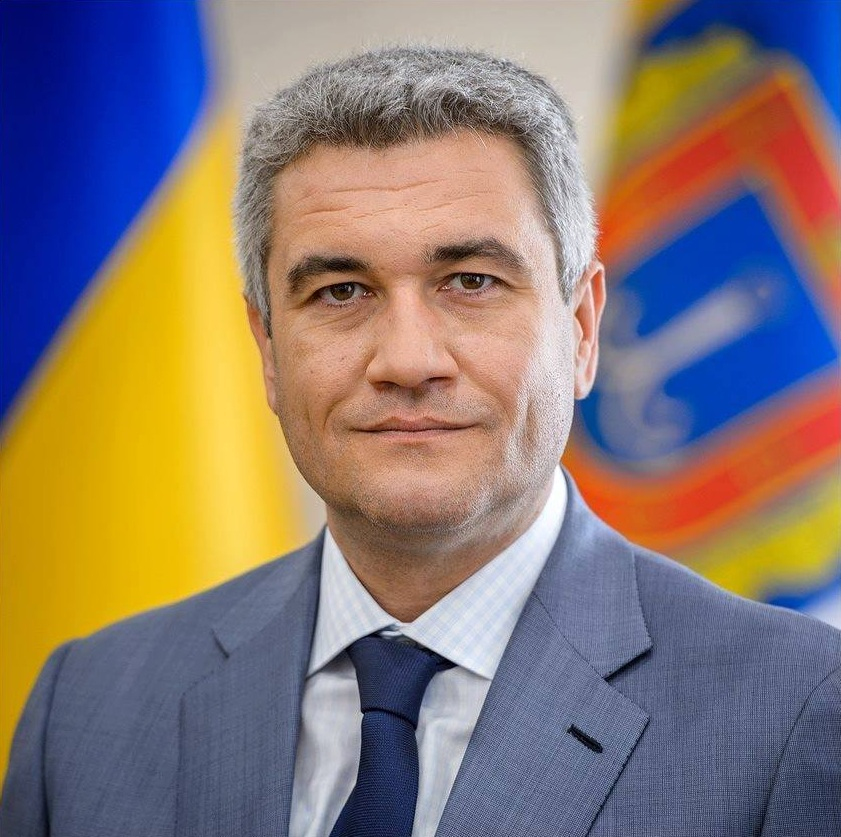

Chairman of the Odesa Oblast Council
- In office 12 November 2015 – 21 August 2019
- Preceded by: Mykhailo Shmushkovych
- Succeeded by: Serhiy Paraschenko

People's Deputy of Ukraine
- Incumbent
- Assumed office 29 August 2019
- Preceded by: Oleksandr Urbanskyi
- Constituency: Odesa Oblast, No. 143

Personal details
- Born: 21 June 1975 (age 51) Odesa, Ukrainian SSR, Soviet Union (now Ukraine)
- Party: For the Future
- Other political affiliations: Independent; BPP
- Education: National University «Odesa Maritime Academy»

Anatoliy Ihorovych Urbanskyi (Ukrainian: Анатолій Ігорович Урбанський; born 21 June 1975) is a Ukrainian politician currently serving as a People's Deputy of Ukraine from Ukraine's 143rd electoral district since 29 August 2019. Elected as an independent, he is currently a member of For the Future.

== Early life and career ==
Anatoliy Ihorovych Urbanskyi was born on 21 June 1975 in the southern Ukrainian city of Odesa. In 1997, he graduated from National University «Odesa Maritime Academy», specialising in the organisation of transit and management of marine transportation. He is a transportation engineer. After his graduation, he began working in the investment field, before joining the ship repair industry in 2005. In 2009, he became administrative manager of the Izmail-based DUNAISUDYOREMONT VAT, a ship maintenance company. Two years later, he was elected as a member of the company's supervisory board, as well as the Port of Izmail.

In 2014, Urbanskyi founded the Prydanavia charity.

== Political career ==
From 2015 to 2019, Urbanskyi was a member of and speaker of the Odesa Oblast Council as a candidate of the Petro Poroshenko Bloc. Initially an independent, he later joined the party.

Urbanskyi ran in the 2019 Ukrainian parliamentary election to represent Ukraine's 143rd electoral district as an independent People's Deputy of Ukraine. He was successfully elected, winning 56.95% of the vote. The next-closest candidate, Viktor Kurtiev of Servant of the People, won 28.52% of the vote. He succeeded his brother, Oleksandr Urbanskyi, as People's Deputy.

=== People's Deputy of Ukraine ===
In the Verkhovna Rada (Ukraine's parliament), Urbanskyi joined the For the Future party. He also joined the Verkhovna Rada Budget Committee. He is also a member of the Kuban inter-factional association.

Urbanskyi owns 4,256 Bitcoin as of a 2021 declaration, equal to ₴6.7 billion in April 2021. Along with his brother Oleksandr, he is currently being investigated for violations of financial laws by anti-corruption organisation Chesno for their purchase of ₴73 million worth of Bitcoin in 2017, almost three times their declared value of ₴25 million the previous year.
