= Bessarabske settlement hromada =

Coordinates: 46°11′N 29°08′E

Bessarabske settlement hromada Бессарабська селищна громада
- Hromada
- Interactive map of Bessarabske settlement hromada
- Country: Ukraine
- Oblast: Odesa Oblast
- Raion: Bolhrad Raion
- Admin. center: Bessarabske

Area
  - Total: 868.1 km^{2} (335.2 sq mi)

Population (2020)
  - Total: 22,553
  - Density: 25.98/km^{2} (67.29/sq mi)
- CATOTTG code: UA51060170000068967
- Settlements: 16
- Rural settlements: 3
- Villages: 13

Bessarabske settlement hromada (Ukrainian: Бессарабська селищна громада) is a hromada in Bolhrad Raion of Odesa Oblast in southwestern Ukraine. Population: 22,553 (2020 est.)

The hromada consists of three rural settlements (Bessarabske, Serpneve, Soborne) and 13 villages:

- Kalachivka
- Krasne
- Luzhanka
- Petrivsk
- Pidhirne
- Prykordonne
- Rivne
- Slobidka
- Sukhuvate
- Vilne
- Vynohradivka
- Yaroslavove
- Yarove

== Links ==
- https://decentralization.gov.ua/newgromada/4383
