= Krasne, Bolhrad Raion, Odesa Oblast =

Rural locality in Odesa Oblast, Ukraine

Krasne Красне
- Village
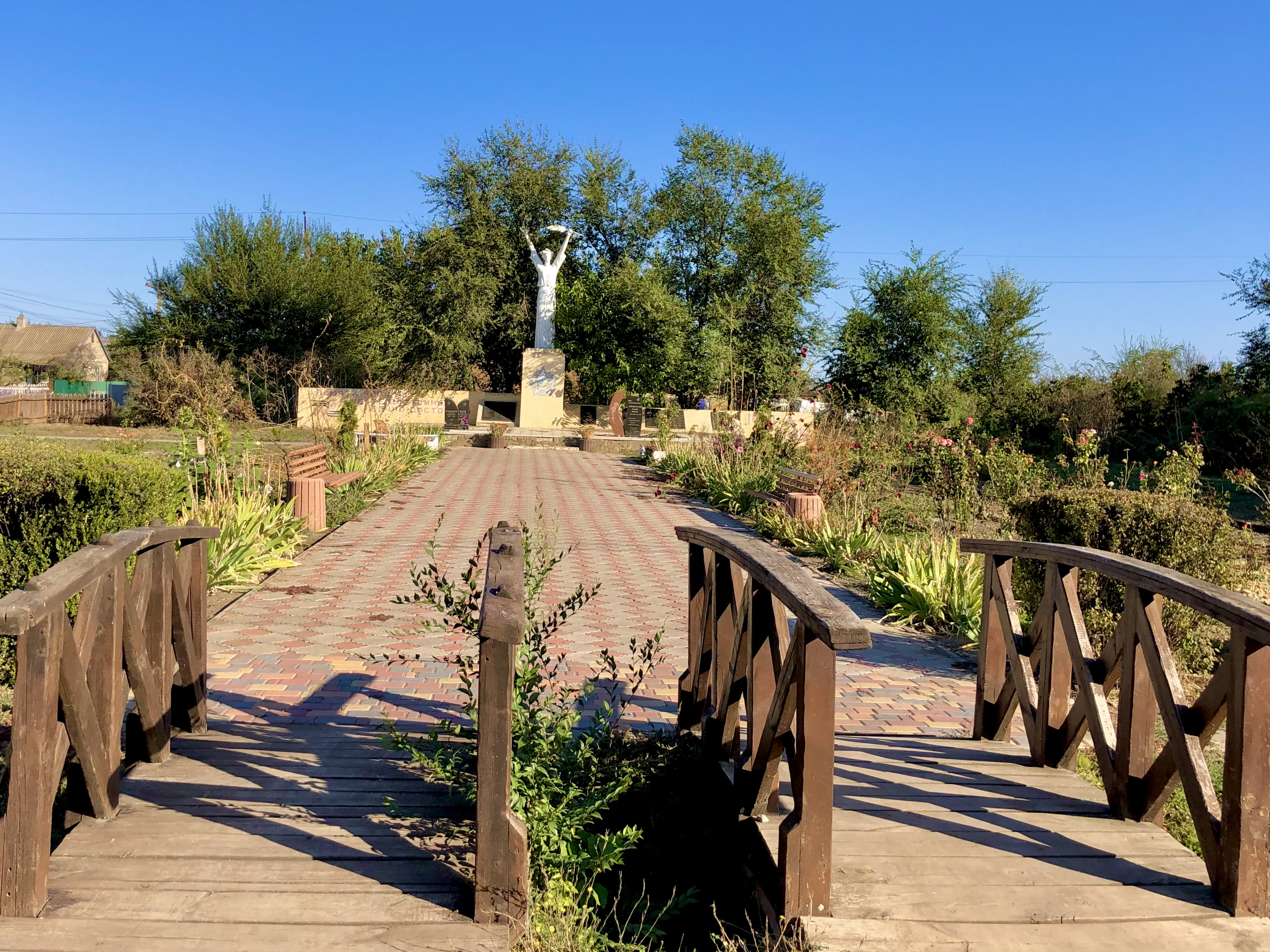

- Location in Ukraine Krasne (Ukraine)
- Coordinates: 46°07′14.88″N 29°14′40.92″E
- Country: Ukraine
- Oblast: Odesa Oblast
- Raion: Bolhrad Raion
- Hromada: Tarutyne settlement hromada
- established: November 1814

Area
  - Land: 3.080 km^{2} (1.189 sq mi)

Population (2001)
  - Total: 1,376
- Time zone: UTC+2 (EET)
  - Summer (DST): UTC+3 (EEST)
- Postal code: 68552
- Area code: +380 4847
- Website: rada.info/rada/04380867/

Krasne (Ukrainian: Красне; Russian: Красное, romanized: Krasnoye; Romanian: Crasna) is a village in the Odesa Oblast, Ukraine, with about 1,300 inhabitants (2001). It belongs to Tarutyne settlement hromada, one of the hromadas of Ukraine.

== History ==
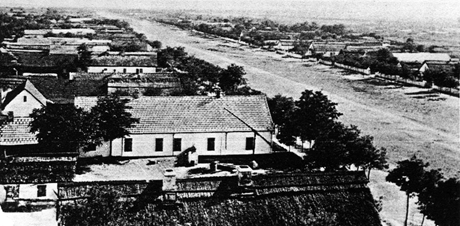
Old photograph of the village

The territory of Bessarabia was established in 1812 in Peace of Bucharest from the Ottoman Vassal Prinzipality of Moldavia together with the Budjak in Imperial Russia. The new acquisition was treated as a colonization area and initially assigned to the Bessarabia Governorate.

In 1814, colonists (mostly Germans) emigrated from the Duchy of Warsaw and established a colony in Bessarabia. Initially, the colony was given the number of the land plot in the overall survey plan on which it was located. Krasna was Steppe No. 7, often referred to as Colonia Catholica. From July 1817 onwards, it was given the name Konstantinovskaya/Konstantinschutz which has been determined from the reading of Krasna's baptismal registrations. From November 1817 onward, in memory of the victory Imperial Russian Army by Russian troops over the French in the Battle of Krasnoye, the village was named Krasna or Krasne.

After Bessarabia became a part of Romania in 1918, the village was known as Crasna. In 1940 the region fell under Soviet control, and the village became Krasne.

Until 18 July 2020, Krasne belonged to Tarutyne Raion. The raion was abolished in July 2020 as part of the administrative reform of Ukraine, which reduced the number of raions of Odesa Oblast to seven. The area of Tarutyne Raion was merged into Bolhrad Raion.

== Geography ==
Krasne is the only village in the 67.26 km^{2} (25.97 sq mi) area of the Bessarabske settlement hromada in Bolhrad Raion.

According to the 2001 census, the majority of the population of Crasna commune was Russian speaking (60.1%), while there were also Ukrainian (15.63%), Gagauz (12.28%), Bulgarian (8.43%) and Romanian (3.27%) speakers.

== See also ==
- Bessarabia Germans
- History of Moldova
