= Vyacheslav Ovechkin =

Ukrainian politician

- В'ячеслав Овечкін

Governor of Odesa Oblast
- Acting
- In office 10 November 2020 – 27 November 2020
- President: Volodymyr Zelenskyy
- Preceded by: Maksym Kutsyi
- Succeeded by: Serhiy Hrynevetsky

Personal details
- Born: Vyacheslav Ihorovych Ovechkin; 14 June 1983 (age 43) Kharkiv, Ukraine, Soviet Union

Vyacheslav Ihorovych Ovechkin (Ukrainian: В'ячеслав Ігорович Овечкін; born 14 June 1983), is a Ukrainian politician, who is the 1st Deputy Head of the Odesa Regional State Administration. He was the acting Governor of Odesa Oblast from 10 November to 27 November 2020.

== Biography ==
Vyacheslav Ovechkin was born in Kharkiv on 14 June 1983.

=== Education ===
From 2000 to 2005, he studied at the National Law Academy of Ukraine named after Yaroslav the Wise, with law, diploma with honors. Simultaneously from 2000 to 2006 he studied at Kharkiv National University of Economics, International Economics, Specialist in International Economics, diploma with honors.

From 2005 to 2006 he studied at the Central European University in Budapest, Master of International Business Law, LL.M., diploma with honors. In 2006, he studied at T.M.C. Asser Institute, Asser College Europe in The Hague), EU and WTO law.

=== Career ===
From 2001 to 2004, he worked as a legal consultant at Agat LLC (Kharkiv). In 2004-2005 he worked as a legal consultant at ICC Partner LLC (Kharkiv).

From 2006 to 2007, he was a lawyer in the representative office of the American law firm Chadbourne & Parke in Kyiv. From 2007 to 2010 he was in the Ukrainian office of the English law firm CMS Cameron McKenna in Kyiv.

From 2011 to 2013, he worked as an investment project advisor at PJSC Concern AVEC & Co.

Between 2013 and November 21, 2019, he was the director of the freight forwarding company "Sonora-Kharkiv" in Kharkiv.

Between 2014 and 1 November 2019, he advised the law firm CMS Cameron McKenna Kyiv in banking and financial law projects.

Since November 2019, Ovechkin is the 1st Deputy Head of the Odesa Regional State Administration.

On 6 November 2020, Ovechkin was the acting Governor of Odesa Oblast.
