= Krynychne, Odesa Oblast =

Krynychne Криничне
- Village
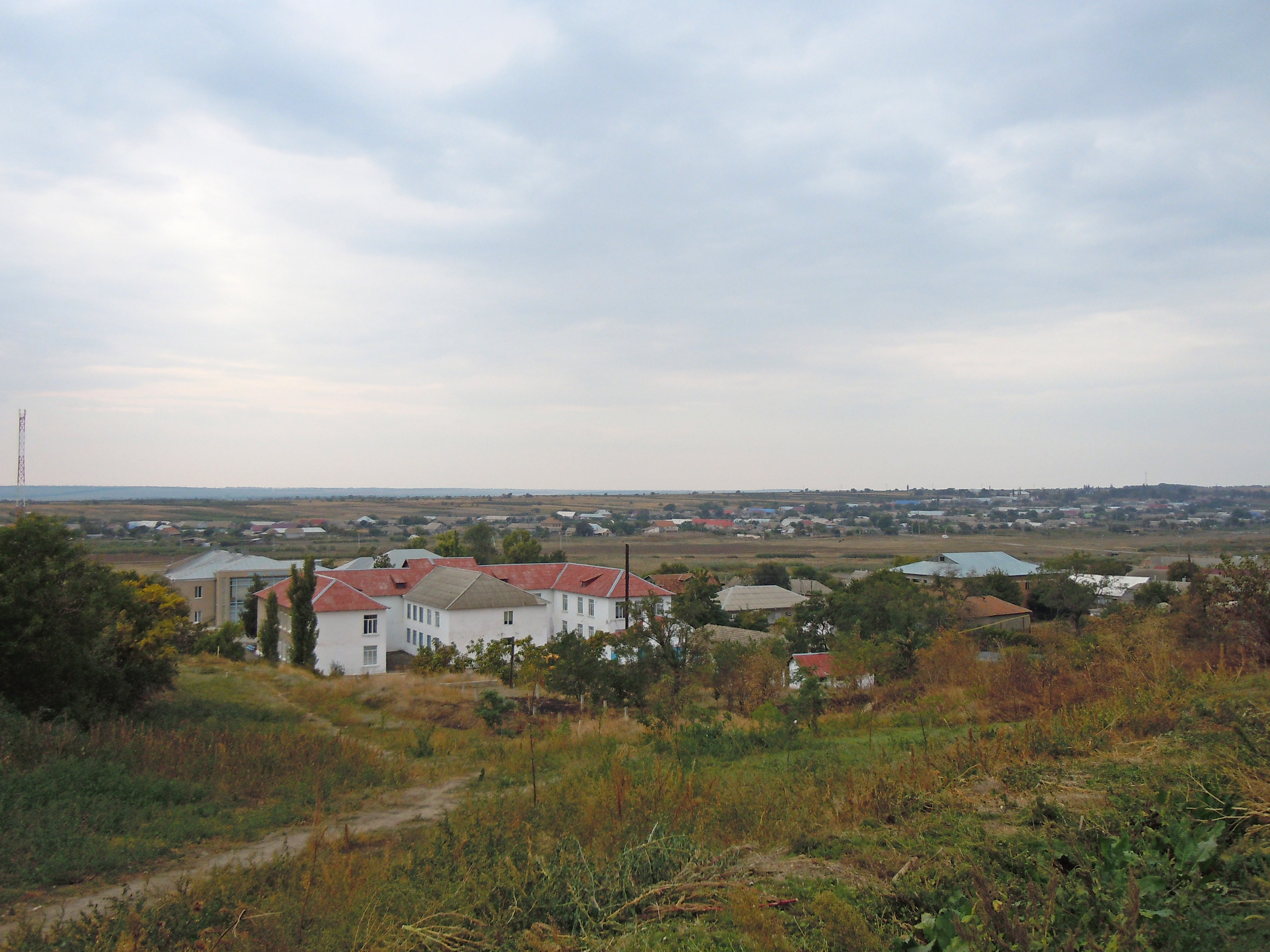

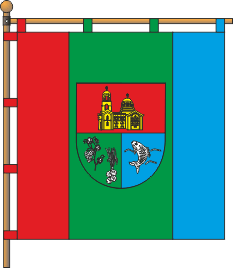
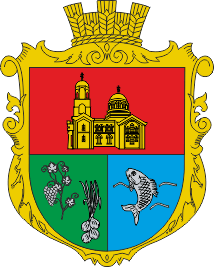
- Flag Coat of arms

- Location in Odesa Oblast Location in Ukraine
- Coordinates: 45°32′09″N 28°40′04″E
- Country: Ukraine
- Oblast: Odesa Oblast
- Raion: Bolhrad Raion
- Hromada: Krynychne rural hromada
- Elevation: 108 ft (33 m)

Population (2001)
  - Total: 4,342
- Time zone: UTC+2 (EET)
  - Summer (DST): UTC+3 (EEST)

Krynychne (Ukrainian: Криничне; Bulgarian: Чушмелия, romanized: Chushmeliya; Romanian: Cișmeaua-Văruită) is a village in Bolhrad Raion, Odesa Oblast, Ukraine. It hosts the administration of Krynychne rural hromada, one of the hromadas of Ukraine.

== History ==
Krynychne was founded in 1813 by Bulgarian settlers on the site of a Tatar settlement and since then has shared the history of the Budjak region in Southern Bessarabia. When the village was founded, the local area belonged to the Russian Empire for only a year. It previously belonged to the Ottoman Empire and only became part of the Russian Bessarabia Governorate under the terms of the Treaty of Bucharest in 1812.

After Russia lost the Crimean War, the area around Southern Bessarabia, in which Krynytschne was located, went to Moldavia in 1856, only to fall back to Russia after the next Russo-Turkish War in 1878 until 1917. During the October Revolution, Bessarabia broke away from Russia, declared itself a Moldovan Democratic Republic in 1917 and voluntarily joined the Kingdom of Romania in the same year.

After the Soviet occupation of Bessarabia in 1940, the village was in Bolhrad Raion of Akkerman Oblast (from 7 August 1940 Izmail Oblast) in the Ukrainian SSR. At the beginning of the German-Soviet War, the village came back to Romania in 1941. After the Red Army recaptured Bessarabia in 1944, the village was back in the Ukrainian Izmail Oblast, which was merged into the Odesa Oblast in 1954. In 1991, the village became part of independent Ukraine.

Krynychne is the site of the Kolonist Winery.

== Demographics ==
According to the 1989 census, the population of Krynychne was 4,607 people, of whom 2,192 were men and 2,415 were women. According to the 2001 census, 4,342 people lived in the village.

Native language as of the Ukrainian Census of 2001:

Language	Percentage
Bulgarian	93.28 %
Russian	3.29 %
Ukrainian	1.29 %
Moldovan (Romanian)	0.69 %
Romani	0.41 %
Gagauz	0.3 %
Armenian	0.05 %
German	0.05 %
Belarusian	0.02 %
Crimean Tatar	0.02 %

== Notable people ==
- Dimitar Agura (1849–1911), Bulgarian historian
- Georgi Agura (1853–1915), Bulgarian lieutenant general
- Gherasim Constantinescu (1902–1979), Romanian oenologist
- Ivan Plachkov (born 1957), Ukrainian politician
