= Krynychne rural hromada =

Coordinates: 45°32′N 28°40′E

Krynychne rural hromada Криничненська сільська громада
- Hromada
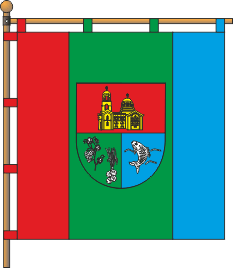
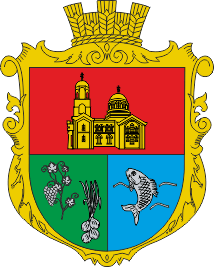
- Flag Coat of arms
- Interactive map of Krynychne rural hromada
- Country: Ukraine
- Oblast: Odesa Oblast
- Raion: Bolhrad Raion
- Admin. center: Krynychne

Area
  - Total: 186.1 km^{2} (71.9 sq mi)

Population (2020)
  - Total: 4,350
  - Density: 23.4/km^{2} (60.5/sq mi)
- CATOTTG code: UA51060110000077844
- Settlements: 3
- Villages: 3

Krynychne rural hromada (Ukrainian: Криничненська сільська громада) is a hromada in Bolhrad Raion of Odesa Oblast in southwestern Ukraine. Population: 4,350 (2020 est.)

The hromada consists of 3 villages:

- Krynychne (seat of administration)
- Kosa
- Novoozerne

== Links ==
- https://decentralization.gov.ua/newgromada/4344#
- https://zakon.rada.gov.ua/laws/showhttps://zakon.rada.gov.ua/laws/show/807-20#Text/807-20#Text
