= Oleh Kiper =

Governor of Odesa Oblast since 2023

- Олег Кіпер
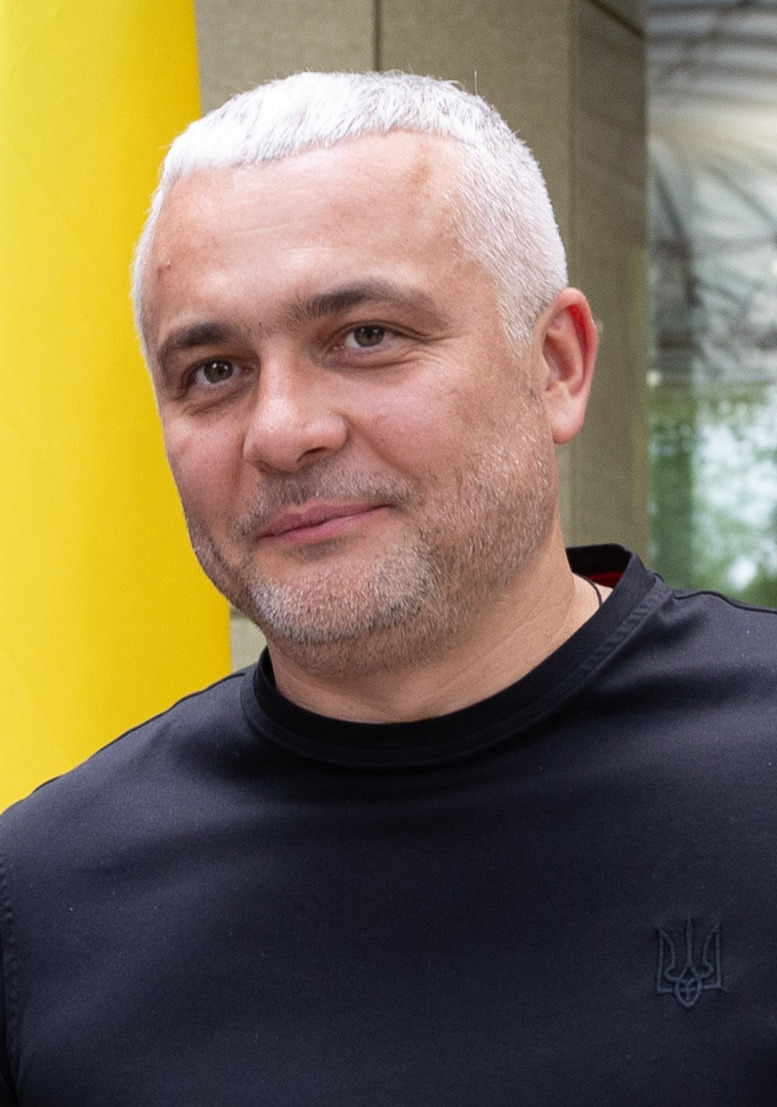
- Kiper in 2023

15th Governor of Odesa Oblast
- Incumbent
- Assumed office 30 May 2023
- President: Volodymyr Zelenskyy
- Prime Minister: Denys Shmyhal; Yulia Svyrydenko; Serhii Koretskyi
- Preceded by: Borys Voloshenkov (acting)

Personal details
- Born: 1 August 1980 (age 46) Tymkove, Odesa Oblast, Ukrainian SSR, Soviet Union

Oleh Oleksandrovych Kiper (Ukrainian: Олег Олександрович Кіпер, born 1 August 1980) is a Ukrainian politician who has served as the Governor of Odesa Oblast since 30 May 2023. Previously, he served as the Deputy Chief Prosecutor and then Chief Prosecutor for the Kyiv City Prosecutor's Office. In 2023, he was appointed by Ukrainian President Volodymyr Zelenskyy as Governor of Odesa Oblast, replacing acting governor Boris Voloshenkov. Kiper has served during the Russian invasion of Ukraine.

== Career ==
Kiper began working at the Kyiv City Prosecutor's Office in 2001. On 9 June 2020, he was appointed the city's Deputy Prosecutor by Prosecutor General Iryna Venediktova. Prior to the appointment, he worked as a freelance advisor to Andriy Yemark. Soon afterwards, he was made the city's Chief Prosecutor. In May 2021, Kiper announced that the office was taking action against businesses illegally operating in underground tunnels below the center of Kyiv.

In February 2022, Russia began an invasion of Ukraine. Kiper controversially took a trip abroad with his wife from 29 December 2022, to 8 January 2023; there was speculation that they had visited Russia. Kiper said they visited a foreign country for a family emergency, but would not specify the country out of concern for his wife's safety. He said that his wife once had a Russian passport, but she renounced it in July 2022. In February 2023, Radio Free Europe/Radio Liberty reported his wife still had a valid Russian passport as of writing. On 23 January 2023, Ukrainian President Volodymyr Zelenskyy "banned state officials from leaving the country during martial law except for official business trips".

On 29 May 2023, Ukraine's Cabinet of Ministers approved Kiper to replace Boris Voloshenkov as Governor of Odesa Oblast. (Voloshenkov was acting governor.) The next day, Zelenskyy appointed Kiper in a decree, and he visited Kiper in Odesa Oblast on the 31st.

After a drone attack on an Odesa apartment block on the night of 1 March and 2 March 2024 which killed at least 12 people (including 5 children), Kiper declared 3 March to be a day of mourning.
