= Canada-Ukraine Parliamentary Program =

Canada-Ukraine Parliamentary Program Programme Parlamentaire Canada-Ukraine
- Abbreviation: CUPP
- Formation: 1991
- Purpose: Educational
- Location: Toronto, Ontario, Canada
- Director: Ihor Walter Bardyn
- Website: www.katedra.org

The Canada-Ukraine Parliamentary Program (French: Programme Parlamentaire Canada-Ukraine, Ukrainian: Парляментарна програма Канада-Україна) or CUPP is a parliamentary internship program for Ukrainian students, established by the Ukrainian Canadians in Canada. The Program provides an opportunity for Ukrainian students to learn about the principles of democratic government and parliamentary procedures in Canada. During the Program, Ukrainian students work and study in Parliament of Canada, as well as gain experience from which generations of Canadian, American and West European students have benefited. On the basis of academic excellence, knowledge of the English or French and Ukrainian languages, and an interest in the parliamentary system of government, undergraduate university students from Ukraine and Ukrainian diaspora can apply for a CUPP scholarship. It is hoped that CUPP will contribute to the education of future leaders of Ukraine. Since the first CUPP program over 400 students from Ukraine and 24 Canadian students have participated in the CUPP program.

== History ==
Education and knowledge will ensure a future for an independent Ukraine.

— СUPP Director Ihor W. Bardyn

On July 16, 1990 the Ukrainian Parliament adopted the Declaration of Sovereignty which declared that Parliament recognized the need to build the Ukrainian state based on the Rule of Law. On August 24, 1991 the Ukrainian Parliament adopted the Declaration of Independence, which the citizens of Ukraine endorsed in the referendum of December 1, 1991. Also in 1991, Canadians celebrated the Centennial of Ukrainian group immigration to Canada. To mark the Centennial, organizations planned programs and projects to celebrate this milestone in Canada's history. The Chair of Ukrainian Studies Foundation at the University of Toronto decided to mark the Centennial by establishing in 1991 the Canada-Ukraine Parliamentary Program for undergraduate university students from Ukraine.

== Model Ukraine Conferences ==
A cycle of conferences has been prepared by the CUPP to discuss and formulate a model for Ukraine's governance and future development as envisioned by young people who are eager to contribute to the future of the country. To this end four Conferences have been planned, to date. Washington Model Ukraine Conference was held at George Washington University, February 2010. The conference focused on the following topics: Identity, Rights and Responsibilities of a Ukrainian Citizen Today; Elections, Politics, History and Culture in a Renewed Ukraine. Ottawa Model Ukraine Conference was held at the University of Ottawa, November 2010. The conference participants discussed the Politics of Education and Elections in Ukraine. Oxford Model Ukraine Conference was held at Oxford University in April, 2011. Ukraine's domestic and foreign affairs and visions for the future were the topics of this conference. The final conference, which concluded the work of the CUPP cycle of conferences, was held in Kyiv in the fall of 2012.

== Notable CUPP Alumni ==
- Solomiia Bobrovska, Member of the Verkhovna Rada of Ukraine (2019–present)
- Alyona Shkrum, Member of the Verkhovna Rada of Ukraine (2014–present)
- Elina Shyshkina, Member of the Verkhovna Rada of Ukraine (2007–2012)
- Volodymyr Omelyan, Ministry of Infrastructure of Ukraine (2016-2019)
- Andriy Pyvovarsky, former Ministry of Infrastructure of Ukraine (2014-2016)
- Rustem Umerov, The minister of defence of Ukraine (2023-present)
