= Luzhanka, Bolhrad Raion, Odesa Oblast =

Rural locality in Odesa Oblast, Ukraine

Luzhanka Лужанка
- Village
- Location within Odesa Oblast Location within Ukraine
- Coordinates: 46°02′39″N 29°11′27″E
- Country: Ukraine
- Oblast: Odesa Oblast
- Raion: Bolhrad Raion
- Hromada: Tarutyne settlement hromada
- Founded: 1830

Area
  - Total: 8.5 km^{2} (3.3 sq mi)

Population (2001)
  - Total: 423
  - Density: 50/km^{2} (130/sq mi)
- Time zone: UTC+2 (EET)
  - Summer (DST): UTC+3 (EEST)
- Postal code: 68555
- Area code: +380-4847

Luzhanka (Ukrainian: Лужанка; Romanian: Catzbach) is a village located in Bolhrad Raion, Odesa Oblast in southwestern Ukraine. It is also located in the historical region of Budjak in southern Bessarabia. Luzhanka belongs to Tarutyne settlement hromada, one of the hromadas of Ukraine.

== History ==
Historical affiliations

Russian Empire 1830–1917
Moldavian Democratic Republic 1917–1918
Kingdom of Romania 1918–1940
Soviet Union 1940–1941
Kingdom of Romania 1941–1944
Soviet Union 1944–1991
Ukraine 1991–present

Until 18 July 2020, Luzhanka belonged to Tarutyne Raion. The raion was abolished in July 2020 as part of the administrative reform of Ukraine, which reduced the number of raions of Odesa Oblast to seven. The area of Tarutyne Raion was merged into Bolhrad Raion.

== Notable people ==
- Serhiy Hrynevetsky (born 1957), politician, Governor of Odesa Oblast (1998–2005, 2020–2022)
