= Mykola Serdyuk =

Ukrainian politician (born 1956)

- Микола Сердюк

Governor of Odesa Oblast
- In office 2 November 2007 – 18 March 2010
- President: Viktor Yushchenko; Viktor Yanukovych
- Preceded by: Ivan Plachkov
- Succeeded by: Eduard Matviychuk

Personal details
- Born: Mykola Dmytrovych Serdyuk; 6 December 1956 (age 69) Khoruzhivka, Ukrainian SSR, Soviet Union (now Ukraine)
- Party: Our Ukraine
- Education: Budyonny Military Academy of the Signal Corps

Military service
- Allegiance: Soviet Union; Ukraine
- Branch/service: Soviet Army; Ukrainian Army
- Years of service: 1977-2005
- Unit: 01319, 64206, 18738, A-1724, A-2171

Mykola Dmytrovych Serdyuk (Ukrainian: Микола Сердюк; born 6 December 1956) is a Ukrainian politician and military officer who served as Governor of Odesa Oblast from 2007 to 2010 under President Viktor Yushchenko.

== Early life and military career ==
Serdyuk was born on 6 December 1956 in the small village of Khoruzhivka, which was then part of the Ukrainian SSR in the Soviet Union. After graduating from secondary school, Serdyuk entered the military, becoming a cadet at the Kharkiv Higher Military Aviation Command School of Communications until 1977. After graduating from there, he became a platoon commander and later a company commander of military unit 01319 of the Soviet Army, which was stationed in Komsomolsk-on-Amur. He left the military in 1984 to pursue higher education, and graduated from the Budyonny Military Academy of the Signal Corps in 1988 with a degree in automated communication systems. He then returned to the military, becoming commander of military unit 64206, which was stationed in Ozerne in Zhytomyr. He was transferred to become Head of Communications for military unit 18738, which was stationed in Tartu in Estonia, where he served until the collapse of the Soviet Union. Following its collapse, he returned to Ukraine and became Head of Communications for military unit 21293 of the Ukrainian Army, which was also stationed in Ozerne, and later became commander of military unit A-1724 in Ozerne. He moved to Odesa only in 1997, when he became commander of military unit A-2171, which was stationed in the city, which he held until 2005.

== Political career ==
In 2005, Serdyuk retired from the military, and he became Head of the Kyivskyi District of Odesa for a few months, from April to August. He was then transferred to becoming Deputy Chairman of the Odesa Oblast State Administration, which he did for two years until 2007. Upon the dismissal of Ivan Plachkov as Governor of Odesa Oblast, Serdyuk was appointed acting governor by President Viktor Yushchenko in decree No. 1058 on 2 November 2007. He was one of a few candidates considered for the post, including recently dismissed Odesa governor Serhiy Hrynevetskyi. Serdyuk was later confirmed by decree of Yushchenko to the post of governor, and not as acting governor, on 6 December 2007. In this role, he focused on the gas transit in the region, saying he wanted to modernise transport and energy networks. He also accused Transnitria of stealing gas in 2009, and advocated for the creation of a free economic zone in Odesa. He stayed in this role for around three years until 18 March 2010, when he was dismissed by President Viktor Yanukovych once Yanukovych became president.

In 2009, while still governor, he headed the regional organisation of Our Ukraine, a position formerly held by People's Deputy Oleksiy Kozachenko. On 25 March 2010, he was appointed deputy mayor of Odesa. He was eventually dismissed in the post too, and later in 2014 headed the election headquarters of Sergei Demidov, who was a candidate for People's Deputy, although the candidacy ended in him not being elected.

== Personal life ==
He is married. He and his spouse have a daughter and two sons.

== Honours and awards ==
- Major general of the Reserve Corps
- Order of Danylo Halytsky (2006)
- Order of Merit, III degree (2009)
- Cross of Ivan Mazepa (2010)
