= Maksym Marchenko =

Ukrainian colonel

- Максим Марченко
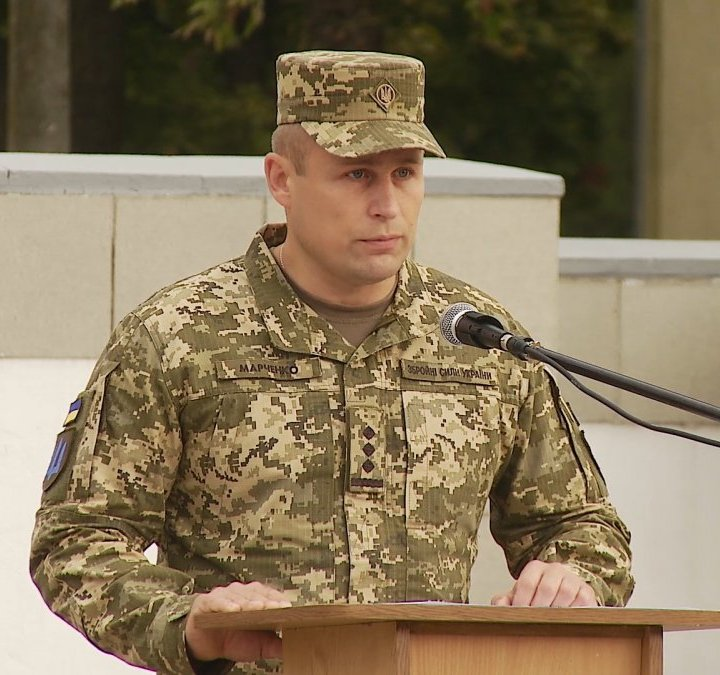
- Marchenko in October 2020

14th Governor of Odesa Oblast
- In office 1 March 2022 – 15 March 2023
- President: Volodymyr Zelenskyy
- Prime Minister: Denys Shmyhal
- Preceded by: Serhiy Hrynevetsky
- Succeeded by: Borys Voloshenkov (acting)

Personal details
- Born: 10 February 1983 (age 43) Sloviansk, Ukrainian SSR, Soviet Union
- Party: Independent
- Education: Kharkiv Institute of Tank Troops; National Defense University

Military service
- Allegiance: Ukraine
- Branch/service: Ukrainian Ground Forces
- Years of service: 2005–present
- Rank: Colonel
- Unit: 28th Mechanized Brigade
- Battles/wars: Russo-Ukrainian War; War in Donbas; Russian invasion of Ukraine

Maksym Mykhaylovych Marchenko (Ukrainian: Максим Михайлович Марченко; born 10 February 1983) is a Ukrainian colonel, former commander of the 28th Mechanized Brigade and the Aidar Battalion of the Ukrainian Ground Forces and he was Governor of Odesa Oblast from 1 March 2022 to 15 March 2023.

== Biography ==
Marchenko was born on 10 February 1983 in Sloviansk, Donetsk Oblast. In 2005, he graduated from the Kharkiv Institute of Tank Troops and studied the Command and Staff Institute for the Use of Troops (Forces) of the National University of Defense of Ukraine.

From 2015 to 2017 he served as the commander of one of the assault battalion of Ukrainian Ground Forces, the Aidar Battalion.

Later, in 2017, he was appointed Deputy Commander of the 92nd Mechanized Brigade, where he stayed for a short time because he led another brigade for a year.

In April 2019, he was promoted to the rank of colonel.

=== Governor of Odesa Oblast ===
On 1 March 2022, during the Russian invasion of Ukraine, he was appointed Governor of Odesa Oblast, succeeding Serhiy Hrynevetsky. On 15 March 2022, Marchenko appointed Anatoly Vorokhaev as his deputy. The same day, Marchenko met with Bernard-Henri Lévy in Odesa. Marchenko was dismissed as Governor by Presidential decree on 15 March 2023.

Political offices
| Preceded by Serhiy Hrynevetsky | Governor of Odesa Oblast; 2022–2023 | Succeeded by Borys Voloshenkov (acting) |
