= Mykola Skoryk =

Ukrainian politician

- Микола Скорик
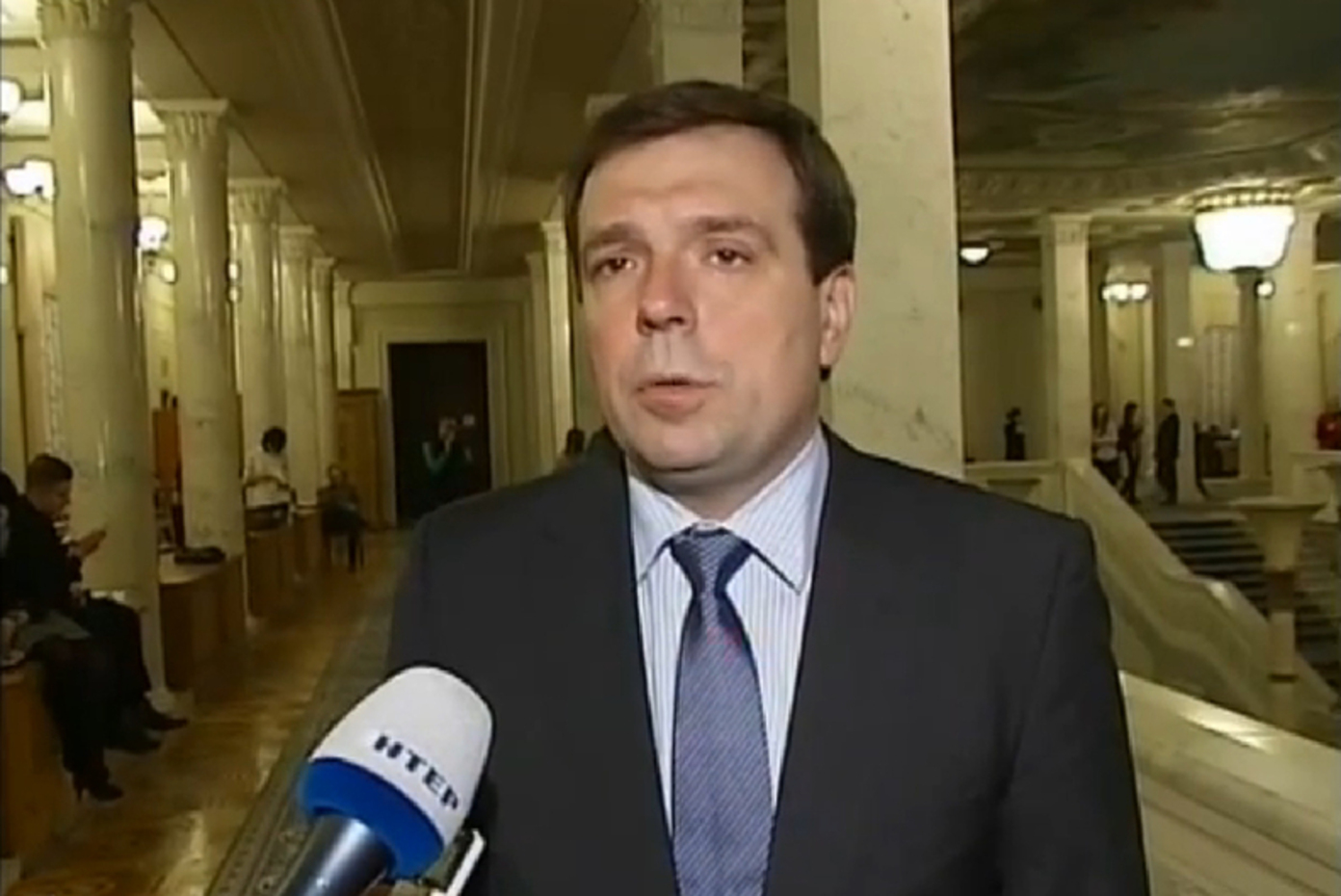
- Skoryk in 2015

Member of the Verkhovna Rada
- Incumbent
- Assumed office 27 November 2014

7th Governor of Odesa Oblast
- In office 8 November 2013 – 3 March 2014
- President: Viktor Yanukovych; Oleksandr Turchynov (acting)
- Prime Minister: Mykola Azarov; Serhiy Arbuzov (acting); Oleksandr Turchynov (acting); Arseniy Yatsenyuk
- Preceded by: Eduard Matviychuk
- Succeeded by: Volodymyr Nemyrovsky

Chairman of the Odesa Oblast Council
- In office 23 May 2006 – 16 November 2010
- Preceded by: Fedir Vlad
- Succeeded by: Mykola Pundyk

Personal details
- Born: 27 November 1972 (age 53) Odesa, Ukrainian SSR, Soviet Union
- Occupation: Politician

Mykola Leonidovych Skoryk (Ukrainian: Микола Леонідович Скорик, born 27 November 1972) is a Ukrainian politician who was Chairman of the Odesa Regional State Administration.

== Career ==
On 9 September 2012, Skoryk took part at the Chornomorets football club's ceremony which was held at the newly built football stadium. On 23 December 2013, he congratulated coach Roman Hryhorchuk and the club's general director, Sergei Kernitsky on their championship participation. For that, they awarded him with the black and blue coloured T-shirt with number one on it and some souvenirs. During the same meeting he also praised the team for winning bronze medals back in 1974 and added that he would like to see current "sailors" to join this football club.

On 25 February 2014, he held a meeting in Odesa with various NGO politicians which included such parties as Batkivshchyna, Party of Greens of Ukraine, Rodina, Svoboda, and Youth Unity. On a day prior to it, he addressed to the people of Odesa:

In these difficult times it is important to remain calm. We need to do everything we can to Odesa remained peaceful town. As head of the region declare I will act, and acting under Ukrainian law. Encourage supporters and opponents of the authorities also act within the law. I'm in the workplace. In Kharkiv, there are no representatives of the Odesa region. The situation in the Odesa region generally calm and under control. Work all local executive authorities. The situation in the country is difficult. Appeal to public organizations operate in a lawful manner. Otherwise, we get to the point of absurdity.

In the October 2014 Ukrainian parliamentary election Skoryk was elected into parliament; after placing 10th on the electoral list of Opposition Bloc.

In September 2016 Skoryk was suspected of involvement in riots targeting Euromaidan-supporters in Odesa in February 2014.

In the October 2019 Ukrainian parliamentary election Skoryk was reelected into parliament; after placing 16th on the electoral list of Opposition Platform — For Life.

In the 2020 Odesa local election Skoryk was a candidate for mayor of Odesa (nominated by Opposition Platform — For Life). But in the second round of the mayoral election he was defeated by incumbent mayor Gennadiy Trukhanov, 54.28% of the voters voted for Trukhanov.

Political offices
Preceded by Eduard Matviychuk	Governor of Odesa Oblast; 2013 - 2014	Succeeded by Volodymyr Nemyrovsky
