= Yelyzaveta Bohutska =

Ukrainian politician (born 1964)

- Єлизавета Богуцька
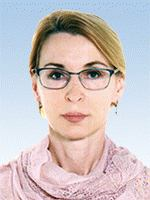
- Official Verkhovna Rada portrait, 2019

People's Deputy of Ukraine
- Incumbent
- Assumed office 29 August 2019

Personal details
- Born: 14 April 1964 (age 62) Simferopol, Ukrainian SSR, Soviet Union
- Party: Servant of the People (since 2019)
- Education: Crimean Medical Institute
- Occupation: Politician
- Profession: Psychiatrist

Yelyzaveta Petrivna Bohutska (Ukrainian: Єлизавета Петрівна Богуцька; born 14 April 1964) is a Ukrainian public activist and Russophone blogger. She serves as a People's Deputy of Ukraine of the 9th convocation from the "Servant of the People" party.

== Early life and education ==
Yelyzaveta Bohutska was born in 1964 in Simferopol (Crimea, Ukrainian SSR). She studied at the Crimean Medical Institute, obtaining a diploma as a pediatrician.

== Career ==
After completing the internship, Yelyzaveta Bohutska received the specialty of a psychiatrist and she worked as a psychiatrist at the Simferopol Regional Hospital.

Later, Bohutska was engaged in entrepreneurial activities. She started her career in design in 1997. Since 2002, she has been a member of the Union of Designers of Ukraine. Until 2004, she lived in "khrushchevka", a low-cost brick apartment building built in early 1960s. In 2008, Bohutska, participated in a TV show on one of the local Crimean TV channels and in a competition for the best country estate, in which her estate won as the most aesthetic.

=== Public and political activity ===
In the early 2010s, Yelyzaveta Bohutska became known as a social activist and blogger in Crimea. In 2014, during the occupation of Crimea by Russia, she took a pro-Ukrainian position. Bohutska lived in Crimea for half a year after the occupation, demonstrating a pro-Ukrainian position. In particular, she wore clothes in the colors of the Ukrainian flag, decorated her car with an embroidered ornament, played the national anthem of Ukraine while driving past the Federal Security Service of Russian Federation (FSB) building in Simferopol, and gave interviews.

In September 2014, Bohutska was detained and interrogated by employees of the FSB of the Russian Federation. The FSB searched her house in Simferopol on September 8, 2014. Bogutska's husband told reporters that during the search the police searched their house for drugs, weapons and Islamic literature. Bogutska was also accused of meeting Mustafa Dzhemilyov, one of the leaders of the Crimean Tatars, in Armiansk on May 3, 2014. After FSB search her house, Bohutska soon left the Crimea for Kyiv.

In June 2015, Bohutska founded the NGO "All-Ukrainian movement of the power of law". In 2017–2018, she worked in the Mikheil Saakashvili team. She is known for her harsh criticism of the Government of Ukraine under President Petro Poroshenko. At the time of her election as a People's Deputy in the summer of 2019, Bohutska did not work. Since 2019, she has been a member of Verkhovna Rada of Ukraine Committee on Humanitarian and Information Policy under the quota of the Servant of the People party.

== Controversies ==
In September 2018, Yelyzaveta Bohutska grossly violated traffic rules by parking her car on the sidewalk. A car parked close to another blocked the passage for pedestrians. In October 2018, she caused a car accident, killing a person. According to Bohutska, the pedestrian crossed the road at a red light and was drunk.

Bohutska was a proponent of COVID-19 misinformation. She demonstratively wore a mask with large holes similar to a similar to a string bag.
