= Serhiy Hrynevetskyi =

Ukrainian politician

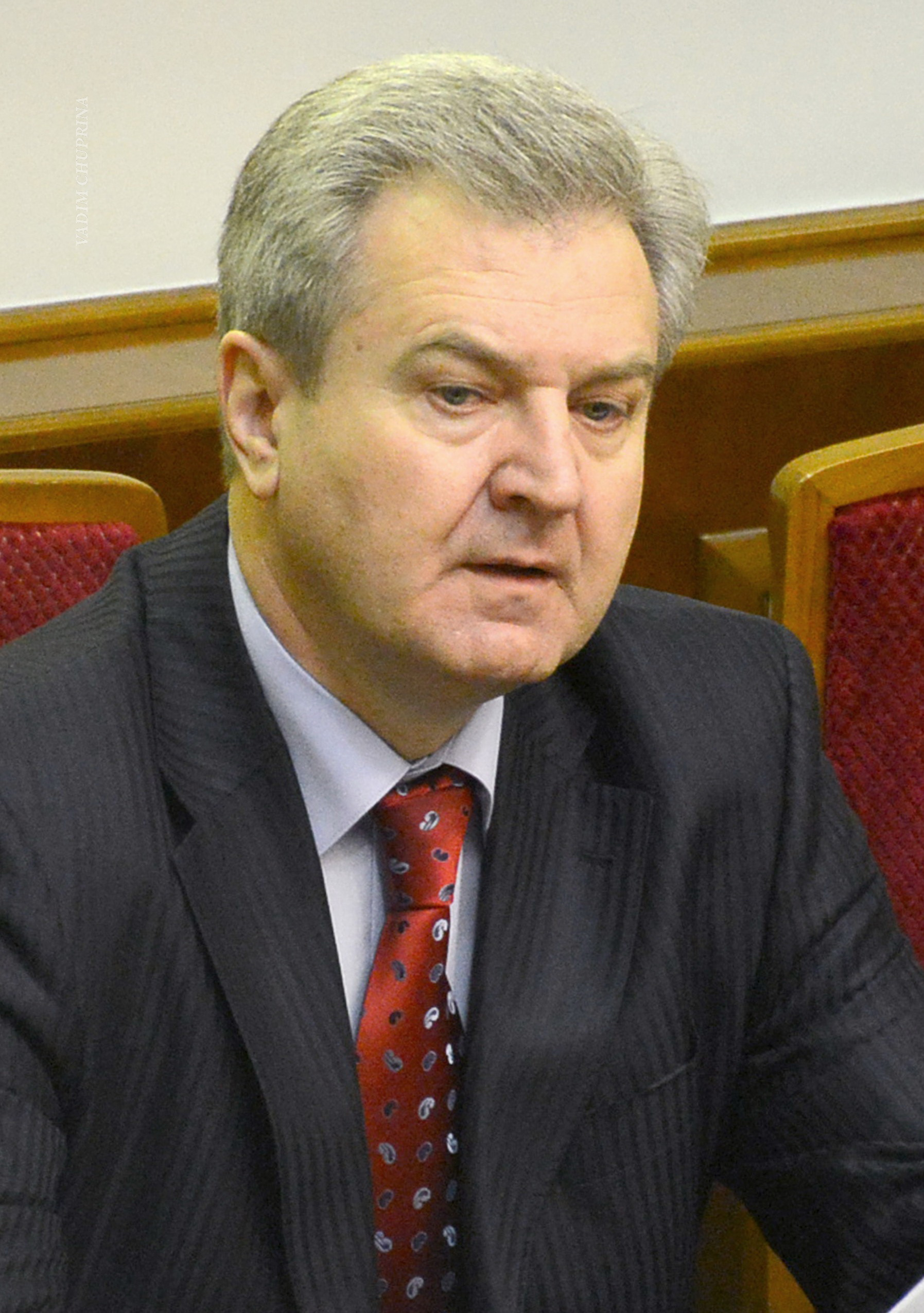

2nd and 14th Governor of Odesa Oblast
- In office 27 November 2020 – 1 March 2022
- President: Volodymyr Zelenskyy
- Prime Minister: Denys Shmyhal
- Preceded by: Vyacheslav Ovechkin (acting)
- Succeeded by: Maksym Marchenko
- In office 26 May 1998 – 3 February 2005
- President: Leonid Kuchma; Viktor Yushchenko
- Prime Minister: Valeriy Pustovoitenko; Viktor Yushchenko; Anatoliy Kinakh; Viktor Yanukovych; Mykola Azarov (acting); Yulia Tymoshenko
- Preceded by: Rouslan Bodelan
- Succeeded by: Vasyl Tsushko

Chairman of the Odesa Oblast Council
- In office 8 February 2005 – 22 July 2005
- Preceded by: Volodymyr Novatskyi
- Succeeded by: Fedor Vlad
- In office 21 September 2000 – 19 April 2002
- Preceded by: Yuriy Kazakov
- Succeeded by: Volodymyr Novatskyi

First Secretary of the Odesa Regional Young Communist League of Ukraine
- In office September 1986 – June 1990

Deputy of the Odesa Regional Council
- Incumbent
- Assumed office November 2020

People's Deputy of Ukraine
- In office 23 November 2007 – 27 November 2014

Personal details
- Born: 25 September 1957 (age 69) Luzhanka, Tarutyne Raion, Odesa Oblast, Ukrainian SSR, Soviet Union
- Citizenship: Soviet (1957–1991); Ukrainian (1991–present)
- Other political affiliations: Communist Party of Ukraine (Soviet Union)
- Education: Odesa Technological Institute of the Refrigeration Industry, Ukrainian Order of the Red Banner of Labor Agricultural Academy
- Occupation: Politician, mechanical engineer

Serhiy Rafailovych Hrynevetskyi (Ukrainian: Сергій Рафаїлович Гриневецький, born 25 September 1957) is a Ukrainian politician who served as the Governor of Odesa Oblast, first from 1998 to 2005, and again from 27 November 2020 to 1 March 2022 following his appointment by President Volodymyr Zelenskyy. Zelenskyy dismissed him on the seventh day of the 2022 Russian invasion of Ukraine.

Hrynevetsky was a member of the Verkhovna Rada in the 6th and 7th convocations.

== Biography ==
=== Early life and education ===
Serhiy Hrynevetsky was born on 25 September 1957 in Luzhanka, Tarutyne Raion, in Odesa Oblast, then part of the Ukrainian Soviet Socialist Republic in the Soviet Union. Hrynevetsky graduated from the Odesa Technological Institute of Refrigeration on 26 June 1979. On 27 February 1985, Hrynevetsky graduated from the Ukrainian Order of the Red Banner of Labor Agricultural Academy. He was educated as a mechanical engineer.

=== Career in Soviet Ukraine ===
He then worked as a technological engineer at the Rodzdilnianski district repair shop until 1980. The same year, he took the position as a senior engineer, which he would hold until 1989. From 1982 to 1984, Hrynevetsky the First Secretary of the Rozdilnianski district committee of the Leninist Communist League of the Youth of Ukraine of Odesa Oblast. From 1984 to 1986, he served as the Second Secretary as the LCLY of Ukraine.

From 1986 to 1990, he served as the First Secretary of the Odesa Regional Committee of the Young Communist League of Ukraine. From 1990 to 1991, he went back to Rozdilnianski district as the regional secretary of the Communist Party of Ukraine, Odesa Oblast.

== Personal life ==
Hrynevetsky speaks both Ukrainian and Russian, the latter of which is his second language. He currently resides in Odesa.
