= Odesa Oblast Council =

Legislature of Odesa Oblast, Ukraine

Type
- Type: Unicameral

Leadership
- Chairman: Hrihoriy Didenko, Servant of the People

Structure
- Seats: 84
- Political groups: Government (57): Our Home is Ukraine (18); Servant of the People (16); For the Future (10); Fatherland (7); Independent (6); Opposition (27): Trust the Deeds (11); European Solidarity (10); Party of Shariy (6) activities banned in 2022

Elections
- First election: 26 June 1994
- Last election: 25 October 2020

Meeting place
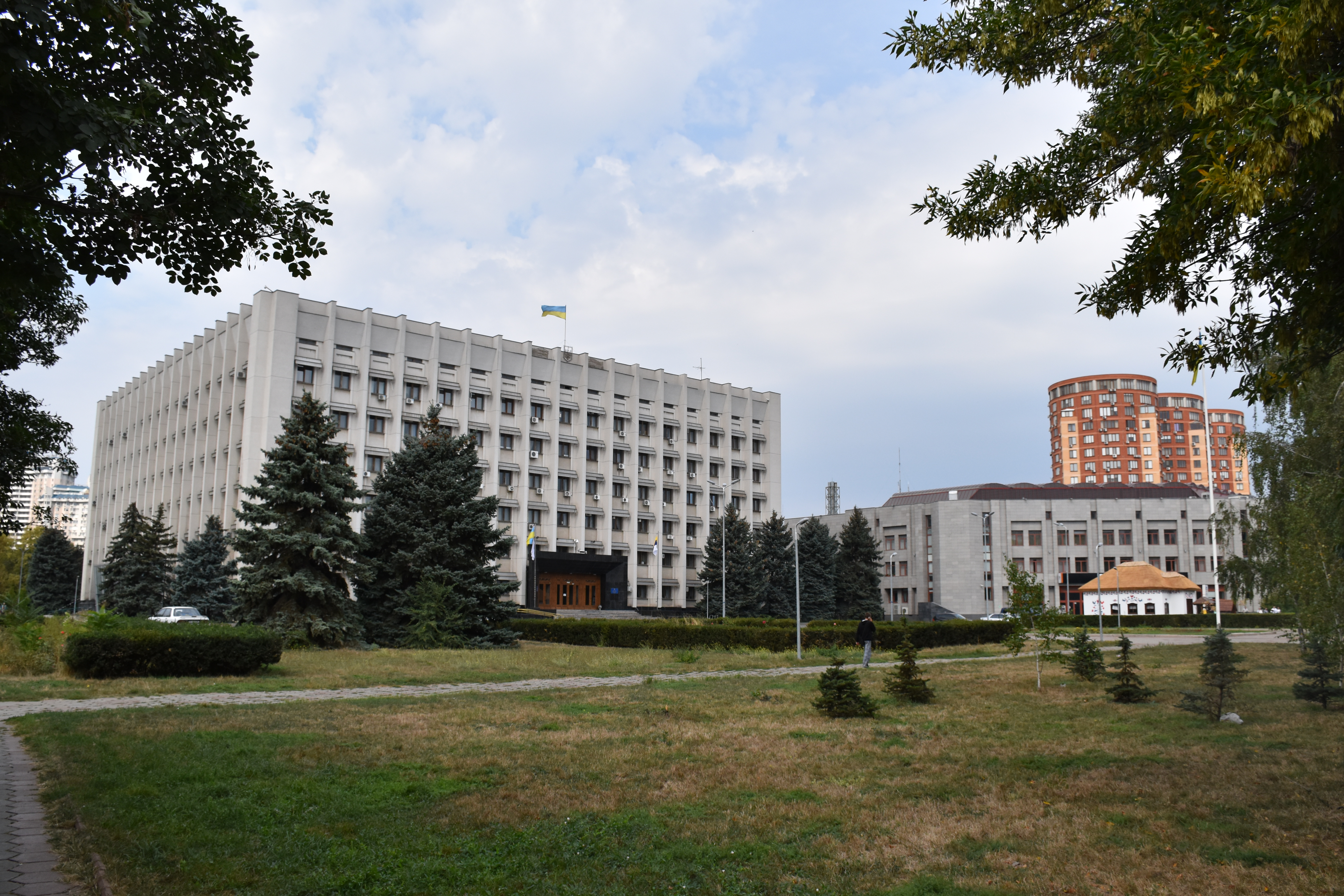
- Odesa, Odesa Oblast

Website
- https://oblrada.od.gov.ua/

The Odesa Oblast Council (Ukrainian: Одеська обласна рада) is the regional oblast council (parliament) of the Odesa Oblast located in Southern Ukraine.

Council members are elected for five year terms. In order to gain representation in the council, a party must gain more than 5 percent of the total vote.

== Recent elections ==
=== 2020 ===
Distribution of seats after the 2020 Ukrainian local elections

- 24 Opposition Platform — For Life
- 16 Servant of the People
- 11 Trust the Deeds
- 10 European Solidarity
- 10 For the Future
- 7 Fatherland
- 6 Party of Shariy

Election date was 25 October 2020

Note: The faction Opposition Platform — For Life ceased to exist on 26 March 2022. 18 deputies joined the newly formed deputy group "Our House Ukraine". Party of Shariy was banned on the same day.

=== 2015 ===
Distribution of seats after the 2015 Ukrainian local elections

- 23 Opposition Bloc
- 22 Solidarity
- 12 Trust the Deeds
- 11 Fatherland
- 8 Revival
- 8 Our Land

Election date was 25 October 2015

== Chairmen ==
=== Regional executive committee ===
- Yakov Pakhomov (1932–1933)
- Fyodor Golub (1933–1935)
- Pyotr Boyko (1935–1937)
- Nikolai Volkov (1937, acting)
- Philip Shevtsov (1937, acting)
- Grigory Galchenko (1937–1938)
- Nikifor Kalchenko (1938–1941)
- Iosif Gorlov (1944–1946)
- Konstantin Karavayev (1946–1953)
- Nikolai Gureev (1953–1954)
- Alexander Fedoseev (1954–1958)
- Mikhail Khorunzhiy (1958–1963)
- Mikhail Khorunzhiy (1963–1964, agrarian)
- Konstantin Kovalenko (1963–1964, industrial)
- Mikhail Khorunzhiy (1964–1969)
- Andrei Dudnik (1969–1971)
- Viktor Pokhodin (1971–1985)
- Andrey Pecherov (1985–1990)
- Anatoliy Butenko (1990–1991)
- Rouslan Bodelan (1991–1992)

=== Regional council ===
- Rouslan Bodelan (1990–1998)
- Yuriy Kazakov (1998–2000)
- Serhiy Hrynevetsky (2000–2002)
- Volodymyr Novatskyi (2002–2005)
- Serhiy Hrynevetsky (2005)
- Fedor Vlad (2005–2006)
- Mykola Skoryk (2006–2010)
- Mykola Pundyk (2010–2013)
- Mykola Tindyuk (2013–2014)
- Oleksiy Honcharenko (2014)
- Mykhailo Shmushkovych (2014–2015)
- Anatoliy Urbanskyi (2015–2019)
- Serhiy Paraschenko (2019–2020)
- Hryhorii Didenko (since 2020)
