= National Academy of Internal Affairs =

Police academy in Ukraine

Coordinates: 50.4327°N 30.4718°E

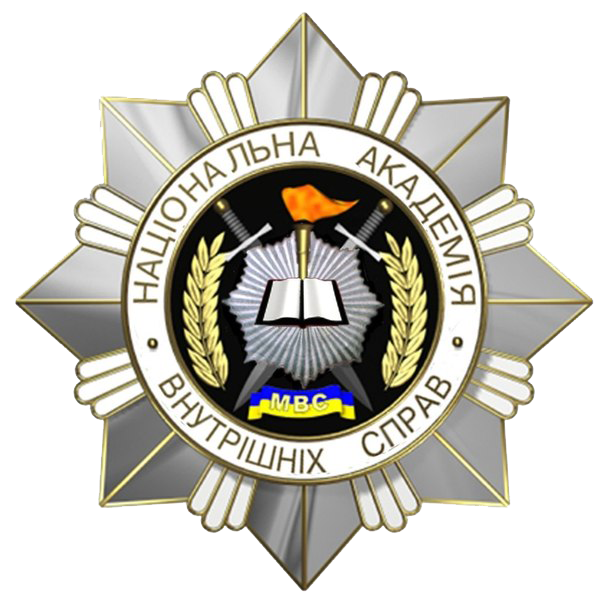
- The academy badge
- Type: police academy
- Established: 1921
- Founders: Ministry of Internal Affairs (Ukraine)
- Rector: Police General 2nd Rank Volodymyr Cherney
- Students: 18,000
- Location: Solomianskyi District, Kyiv, Ukraine
- Language: Ukrainian
- Colors
- Website: www.naiau.kiev.ua

The National Academy of Internal Affairs (Ukrainian: Національна академія внутрішніх справ, romanized: Natsionalna akademiia vnutrishnikh sprav [nɐts⁽ʲ⁾ioˈnɑlʲnɐ ɐkɐˈdɛmijɐ ˈu̯nut⁽ʲ⁾r⁽ʲ⁾iʃn⁽ʲ⁾ix ˈsprɑu̯]) is an educational institution in the Ministry of Internal Affairs that serves as a higher lever training center for future personnel of the National Police of Ukraine. It is one of seven educational institutions in the ministry.

== History ==
The almost century-old history of its formation dates back to 11 June 1921, when local police courses of the Kharkiv militia were established. This date is considered the birthday of the current academy. A year later, on the basis of the former Courses, the School of the Senior Command of the Workers 'and Peasants' Militia of the USSR was established. On 25 December 1922, the school was reorganized with state support. After taking the necessary organizational measures, on 23 October 1923, the institution was renamed the All-Ukrainian School of Police and Criminal Investigation. The newly created institution acquired the status of a republican one and began to train senior command staff for police departments throughout the Ukrainian SSR. In 1925, the All-Ukrainian School was relocated from Kharkiv to Kyiv, where in 1936 the school was renamed the Vsevolod Balitsky School of Senior Chiefs of the Workers 'and Peasants' Militia. At the end of World War II, the school resumed its work and subsequently underwent a number of reorganizations and renamings. In 1960, the Higher School of the Ministry of Internal Affairs of the USSR merged with the Kyiv Special Police High School (since 1968 the school was called the Kyiv College of Ministry of Interior. After the proclamation of Ukraine's independence, the Cabinet of Ministers of Ukraine on 27 January 1992 established the Academy of Internal Affairs with its recognition as the main scientific and educational center. In December 1996, by order of President Leonid Kuchma, it gained national status. Nine years later, in September 2005, the academy was renamed the Kyiv National University of Internal Affairs and was reorganized the five years later. The veterans’ organization of the academy was created on 24 November 1995.

== Present ==
The National Academy of Internal Affairs provides educational services for the training of bachelor's and master's degree specialists. More than 15,000 students, cadets and students study full-time and part-time at specialized institutes and faculties. Since 2016, the Department of Military Training of Reserve Officers has been functioning at the academy.

The law lyceum also educates children whose parents are law enforcement officers who died or were injured in the during the Russo-Ukrainian War. Graduates serve in various positions in units of the Ministry of Internal Affairs, as well as the Security Service of Ukraine. The Academy is a member of the Association of European Police Colleges. It also maintains a unit called the Special Peacekeeping Center.

=== Structure ===
- Educational and scientific institutes
  - Educational and Scientific Institute No. 1 (9 Narodnoe Opolcheniye Street)
  - Educational and Scientific Institute No. 2 (3, General Karbyshev Street)
  - Educational and Scientific Institute No. 3 (4 Kolektorna Street)
  - Educational and Scientific Institute of Distance and Distance Learning
- Institutes and faculties
  - Institute of Postgraduate Education
  - Institute of Penitentiary Service
  - Prykarpattia Faculty (Ivano-Frankivsk, 3 National Guard Street)
- Other educational units
  - Yaroslav Kondratiev Police and Security Forces High School
  - Educational and training department of pre-medical training
  - Educational and practical center of course special training and advanced training of specialists in the field of pyrotechnic products
- General academic departments
- Departments
- Other divisions
- Doctoral and postgraduate studies

== Student life ==
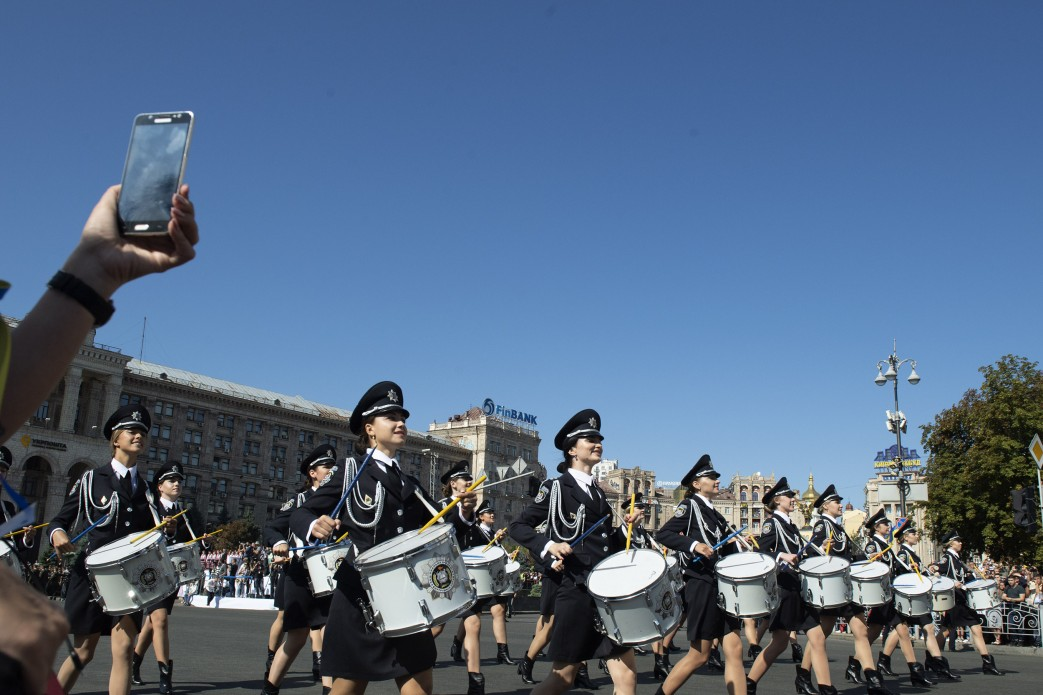
A corps of drums from the academy on Independence Day.

The general library was founded on 15 January 1957, today being used for academic studies by cadets. The academy maintains its own sports team. In November 2013, the drummers ensemble of the academy took part in the military parade on Khreschatyk Street in honor of the 70th Anniversary of the Liberation of Kyiv.

=== Museum of the Ministry of Internal Affairs ===
The Museum of the Ministry of Internal Affairs of Ukraine (Ukrainian: Музей МВС України) was opened at the academy on 21 August 2004.

The exhibits of the museum include the activities of law enforcement agencies of Ukraine from the times of Kievan Rus to the present. The museum has more than 20,000 exhibits that cover the process of formation and organization of law enforcement agencies dating back to the General Secretariat of Internal Affairs (MIA) of the Ukrainian People's Republic of the Central Council. During the existence of the museum, more than 2,000 excursions were conducted, which were visited by about 40,000 people. Representatives of more than 250 foreign delegations, including those from Austria, Azerbaijan, Angola, Belarus, Vietnam, Egypt, Israel, Nigeria, Moldova, Russia, Canada and Libya visited the museum.

=== Band ===
The military band is a structural subdivision of the National Academy of Internal Affairs and is designed to promote patriotic and cultural education to the personnel of the academy. It follows certain regulations on brass bands of the Ministry of Internal Affairs of Ukraine. The main tasks of the band is to take part in carrying out solemn ceremonies, celebrations, and significant events in the academy. It also performs in enterprises, houses of culture, on radio and television.

== Heads ==
=== Head of the KVS of the MVD ===
- Colonel of the Internal Service Andrei Samoilenko (1958—1960)
- Colonel of the Internal Service Viktor Stetsenko (1960—1962)
- General of the Internal Service Aleksei Brovkin (1962-1967)
- Major General of the Police Ivan Degtyarev (1967—1980)
- Police Lieutenant General Vitaliy Zakharov (1980-1983)
- Major General of Police Veleonin Snezhinsky (1983-1992)

=== Rectors ===
- Colonel-General of Police Vitaly Rozenko (1992-1994)
- Colonel-General of Police Yaroslav Kondratiev (1994-2005)
- Lieutenant-General of Police Yevhen Moiseev (2005-2010)
- Lieutenant-General of Police Valentyn Kovalenko (April 2010 – 2014)
- Police General 2nd Rank Volodymyr Cherney (since 2014)

== Notable alumni ==
- Maksym Kutsyi, 12th Governor of Odesa Oblast
- Valentyn Galunko, Ukrainian scientist
- Valeriya Lutkovska, 2nd Ombudsman of Ukraine
- Ihor Bondarenko, entrepreneur and politician.
- Vasyl Grytsak, People's Deputy of Ukraine of the V and VI convocations
- Oleksandr Prokudin, Governor of Kherson Oblast
- Taras Topolia, singer
- Oleksandr Usyk, boxing champion

== See also ==
- Ministry of the Interior Academy of the Republic of Belarus
- Omsk Academy of the Ministry of Internal Affairs
- Hetman Petro Sahaidachnyi National Ground Forces Academy
- Ştefan cel Mare Police Academy
