= Soborne =

Rural locality in Odesa Oblast, Ukraine

Soborne Соборне
- Rural settlement
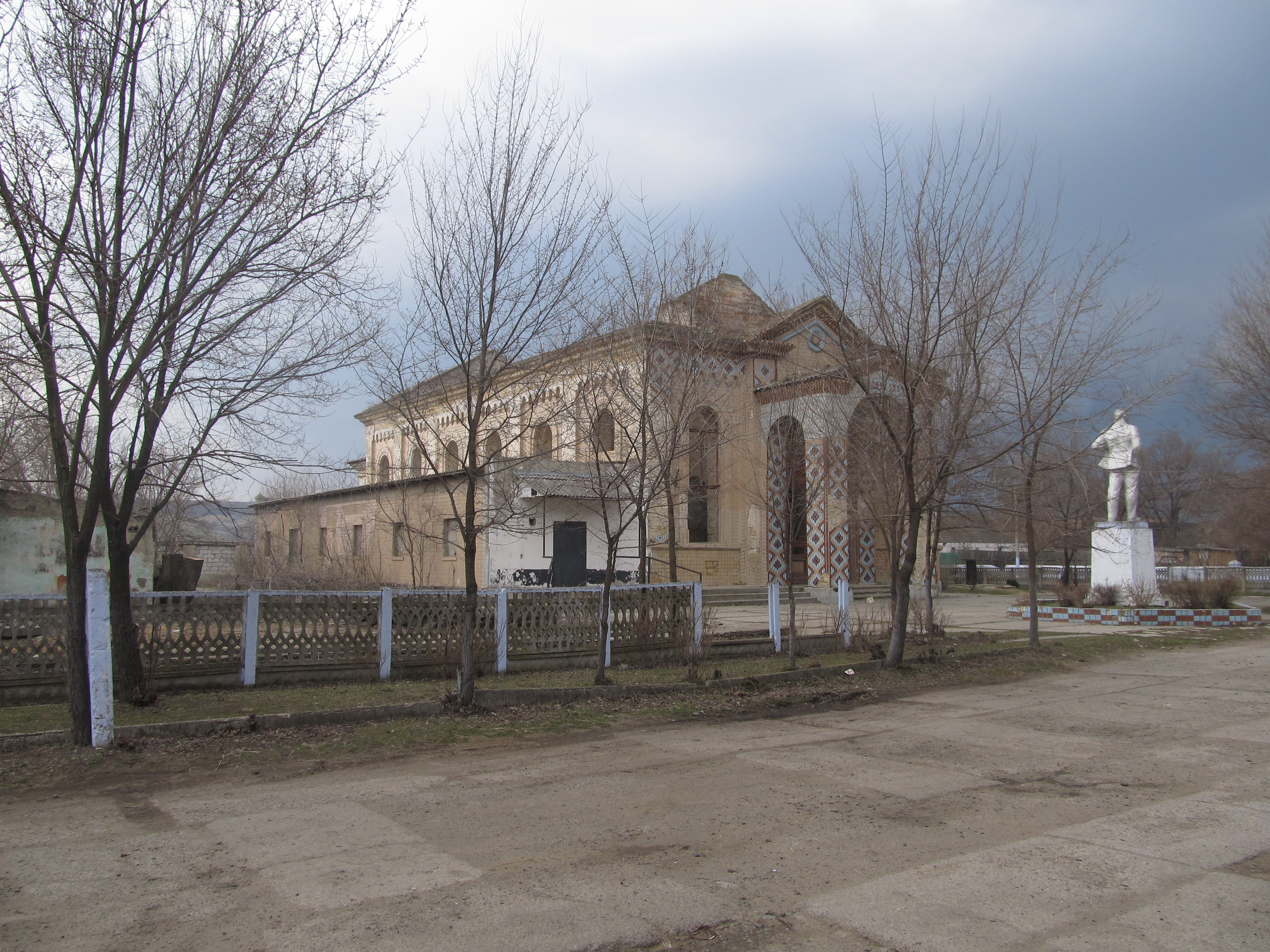
- Interactive map of Soborne
- Location within Odesa Oblast Location within Ukraine
- Coordinates: 46°13′39″N 29°12′11″E
- Country: Ukraine
- Oblast: Odesa Oblast
- Raion: Bolhrad Raion
- Hromada: Tarutyne settlement hromada

Population (2022)
  - Total: 3,343
- Time zone: UTC+2 (EET)
  - Summer (DST): UTC+3 (EEST)

Soborne (Ukrainian: Соборне), formerly known as Berezyne (Ukrainian: Березине; Romanian: Berezina; Russian: Березино), is a rural settlement in Bolhrad Raion, Odesa Oblast, Ukraine. It is located on the left bank of the Kohylnyk. Soborne belongs to Tarutyne settlement hromada, one of the hromadas of Ukraine. Population: 3,343 (2022 estimate).

== History ==
Until 18 July 2020, Berezyne belonged to Tarutyne Raion. The raion was abolished in July 2020 as part of the administrative reform of Ukraine, which reduced the number of raions of Odesa Oblast to seven. The area of Tarutyne Raion was merged into Bolhrad Raion.

Until 26 January 2024, Berezyne was designated urban-type settlement. On this day, a new law entered into force which abolished this status, and Berezyne became a rural settlement.

In September 2024, by the decision of the Verkhovna Rada, Berezyne was renamed to Soborne.

== Economy ==
=== Transportation ===
Berezyne railway station, located in the settlement, is a terminal station on a railway line from Artsyz, which, in its turn, is a station on the railway connecting Odesa and Izmail. There is infrequent passenger traffic. However, an abandoned railway link between Basarabeasca (Moldova) and Berezyne was rebuilt and reopened for freight traffic in August 2022. This link is 23 kilometres (14 mi) long of which 1.2 kilometres (0.75 mi) is in Moldova.

The settlement is connected by road with Artsyz, where there are further connections to Odesa. Other roads cross into Moldova.
