= Governor of Odesa Oblast =

Chief executive of Odesa Oblast, Ukraine

Head of military administration of Odesa Oblast
- Seal of Odesa Oblast

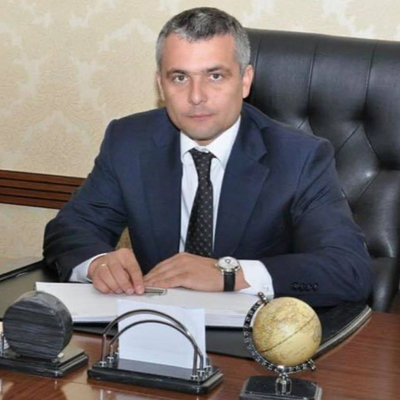
- Incumbent; Oleh Kiper since 30 May 2023
- Residence: Odesa
- Term length: Four years
- Inaugural holder: Valentyn Symonenko; 1992
- Formation: 1992 as Presidential representative
- Website: Government of Odesa Oblast

The governor of Odesa Oblast is the head of the executive branch of government for the Odesa Oblast of Ukraine. The office of governor is an appointed position, with officeholders being appointed by the president of Ukraine, on recommendation from the prime minister, to serve a four-year term.

The official residence for the governor is located in Odesa. Due to the current Russo-Ukrainian war, since 24 February 2022, the governor of Odesa Oblast is officially called Head of the Odesa Regional Military Administration.

== Governors ==
=== Representatives of the President ===
- Valentyn Symonenko (1992)
- Vladlen Ilyin (1992–1994)
- post eliminated, functions performed by the head of the executive committee ex officio (1994–1995)

=== Heads of the Administration ===
- Rouslan Bodelan (1995–1998)
- Serhiy Hrynevetsky (1998–2005)
- Vasyl Tsushko (2005–2006)
- Borys Zvyahintsev (2006) (acting)
- Ivan Plachkov (2006–2007)
- Mykola Serdyuk (2007–2010) (Note: Acting to December 6, 2007)
- Eduard Matviychuk (2010–2013)
- Mykola Skoryk (2013–2014)
- Volodymyr Nemyrovsky (2014)
- Ihor Palytsia (2014–2015)
- Mikheil Saakashvili (2015–2016)
- Solomiia Bobrovska (2016–2017) (acting)
- Maksym Stepanov (2017–2019)
- Serhiy Paraschenko (acting since 6 April to 11 June 2019)
- Svitlana Shatalova (acting since 14 June to 11 October 2019)
- Maksym Kutsyi (2019–2020)
- Vyacheslav Ovechkin (acting from 10 November 2020 to 27 November 2020)
- Serhiy Hrynevetsky (2020–2022)

Heads of military administration

- Maksym Marchenko (2 March 2022–15 March 2023) (Note: Marchenko was appointed on the seventh day of the 2022 Russian invasion of Ukraine.)
- Borys Voloshenkov (acting 16 March 2023–29 May 2023)
- Oleh Kiper (30 May 2023–present)
