= Pryberezhne =

Pryberezhne (Ukrainian: Прибережне) is a Ukrainian place name that can refer to the following localities:

Urban-type settlements

- Pryberezhne, Donetsk Oblast

Villages

- Pryberezhne, Saky Raion, Crimea
- Pryberezhne, Sudak Municipality, Crimea
- Pryberezhne, Vinnytsia Oblast
- Pryberezhne, Zhytomyr Oblast

Rural settlements

- Pryberezhne, Odesa Oblast
