= Wine production in Odesa Oblast =

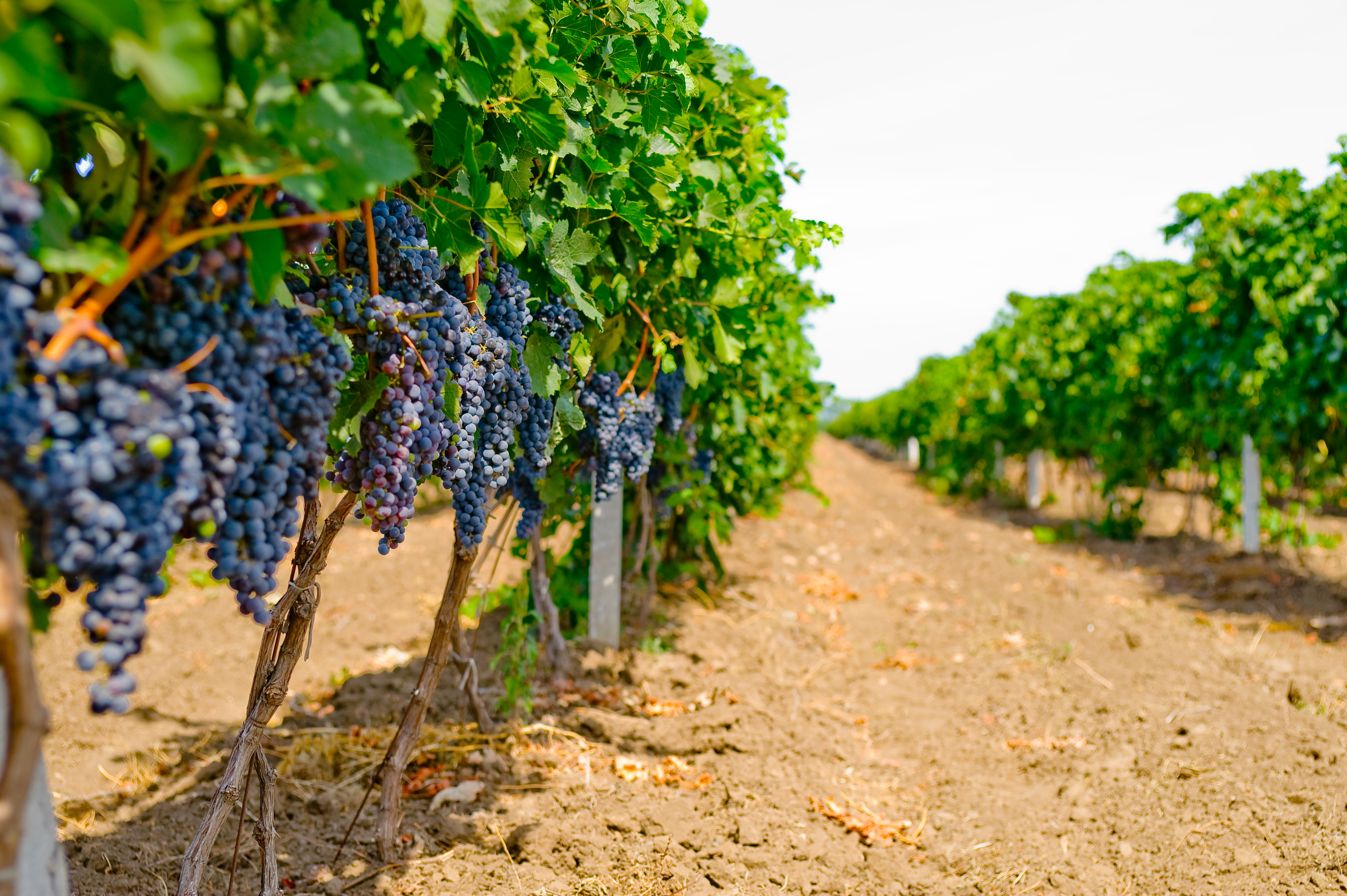
Shabo Vineyards

Odesa Oblast is the largest wine-growing region in Ukraine. As of 2018, wine production in Odesa Oblast covered 26.29 thousand hectares – 60.44% of the total area of vineyards in Ukraine.

The region is located in the favorable climate of the northwestern Black Sea coast, from the mouth of the Danube River to the Tylihul Estuary. According to 2015 data, grape production is carried out in 13 out of 26 districts (according to the previous administrative-territorial division of Ukraine). Agricultural enterprises produced 2,966,984.57 quintals of grapes in 2018.

As of October 5, 2016, according to the official classification of types of economic activity, the production of grape wines is carried out by 4 entrepreneurs and 152 legal entities, and 55 private enterprises and 528 legal entities are engaged in growing grapes.

As of 2018, the largest share of the production of wine products belongs to grape must – 57.88%, in second place – the production of wine with an actual alcohol concentration of no more than 15% – 24.08%. The third place in the region belongs to the production of sparkling wine from fresh grapes – 10.77. The region includes the Black Sea and Bessarabian wine regions. The history of wine making in the Odesa Oblast dates back to ancient times.

== History ==
Even before the Greek colonization of the Black Sea area, the local inhabitants of the region already supported winemaking. However, the craft became more wide spread during Greek colonization in ancient times. This area was under the influence of the Greeks until the middle of the 2nd century BC.

After the conquest of the province of Dacia by Emperor Trajan in 105–106, these lands were influenced by the Romans, who actively colonized this region. After the transition of the Roman troops to the south in 271, a part of the colonists remained in the area, who passed on the experience of breeding grape varieties and wine making methods to the native population. The successful acclimatization of the grape vine is connected with the technological revolution of the farms of the Northern Black Sea region.

The first written mention of the late modern era is a letter from Voivode Stefan Chmielecki, who presented "one vineyard" to the family of Nikoa Varzar and his brother Theodore (1600–1625). There is evidence from Skendo, which reports on the case of wine delivery to Moscow in 1790.

After the capture of Ochakov in 1788, Prince Potemkin provided the colonists and Ukrainians with vineyards in Slobodzia, Iași, Biliaivka, and Ovidiopol. In general, the modern territory of the Odesa Oblast encompassed fully or partially the Ananiv, Odesa, Izmail, Akkerman, and Balta districts.

In the 19th century, a large number of representatives of various nationalities settled in Odesa, which contributed to the spread of winemaking in the region. So, from Izmail and Kiliia to the Dniester Estuary, Armenian settlements spread. Bulgarians founded their villages nearby, and the first German colonists from the Duchy of Warsaw, and later from Württemberg and Alsace, arrived here. The Greek uprising prompted refugees from Thrace and the Archipelago to move to new lands. They settled in Ishmael, Reni and Akkerman. Ukrainians and Moldovans (Romanians) immigrated from Ukraine (Podilia), and educated farmers immigrated from French Switzerland. All this provided the definition of the region as "America of the Old World."

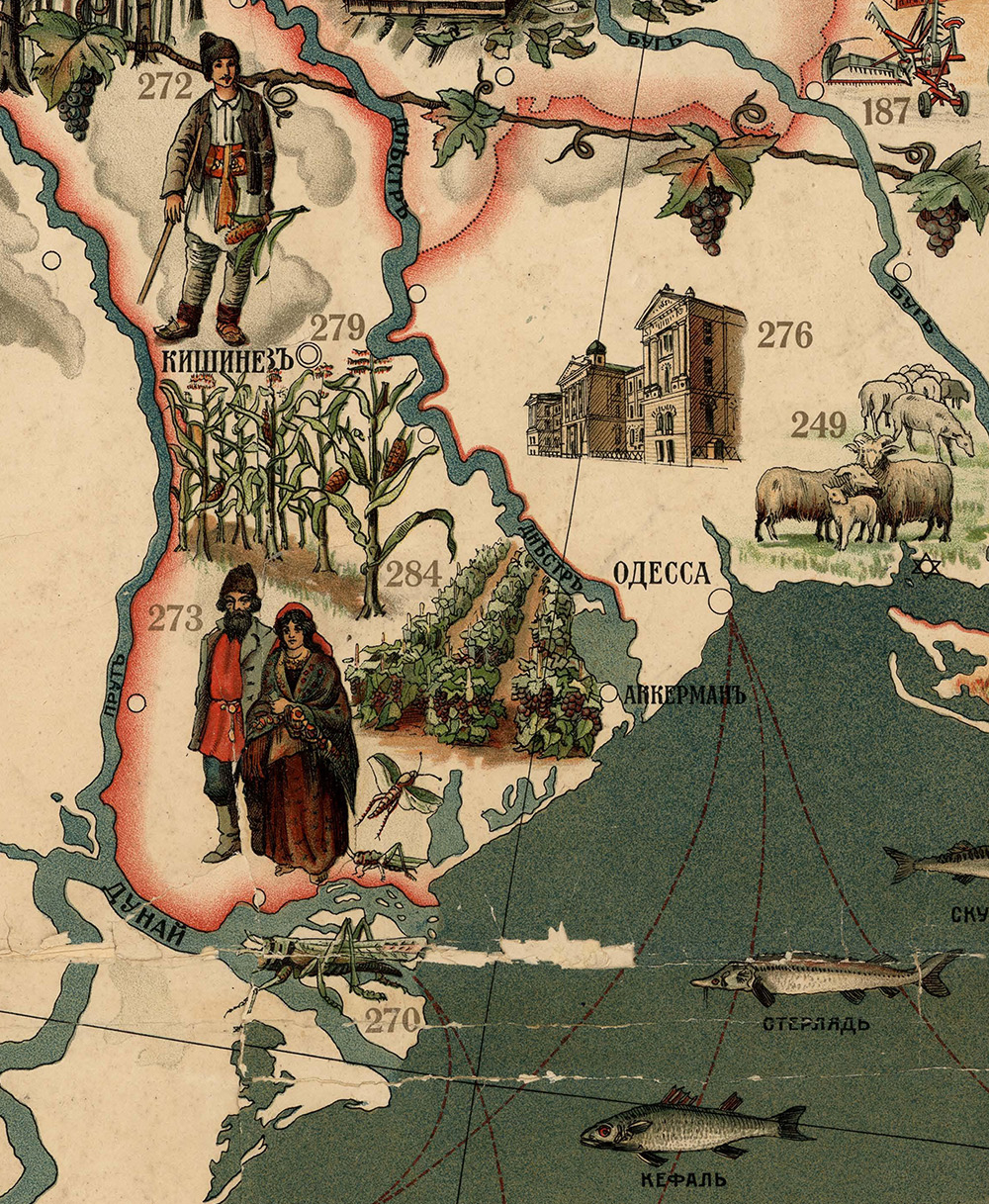
Illustrated map of European Russia, Odesa Oblast, 1896

The first vineyard in Odesa, "for the purpose of horticulture and wine making," was founded in 1798 by a retired major of the Greek battalion in Moldavanka, near Vodnaya Balka. Seedlings were brought from Ackerman, but not all took root and vines were delivered from France and Spain. The first barrels of cultured wine were corked here.

In 1809, Richelieu founded "real tree plantations" at this place, which today is called Dyukivsky Park.

Odesa merchant Ivan Rubo planted 250,000 grape vines and had nurseries with 130,000 French seedlings on his hundred acres of land near the Tiraspol tract. According to the statistics of the Odesa city authorities, in Odesa alone in 1807 there were 8 vineyards with an area of more than 10 acres, from 1812 to 1818 there were 54, and in 1827 there were more than 162 of them. According to the same statistics of 1860, Odesa produced 32 thousand barrels of wine, colonists and state peasants – more than 40 thousand barrels each, and landowners – approximately 5 thousand barrels.

The years 1820–1850 are characterized by rapid growth, then by a decrease until 1890, and later by an increase until 1913 of the wine-growing area in Odesa. From 1885 to 1910 were the most productive years for the wine industry of the region, which today (the 21st century) is called the Odesa Oblast. The area of vineyards has grown to 7 thousand hectares. Approximately one million poods of wine, mostly Bessarabian wine from Akkerman, with only a third being from the Crimea and the Caucasus were imported into Odesa itself annually.

Imports are small, 20,000 poods in wooden containers. There are strong wines: Marsala, Madeira, Sherry and up to 40,000 bottles of sparkling wines. 600–700 thousand poods were exported to various cities of the Russian Empire through the port and by rail. There were companies owned by Nuvo, Sinadino, Rosenblatt, Bernstein, Guinand, Bolgarov, Syrogos, Fischer, Rabinovich and the factories of the Winery Society (1,300,000 rubles in assets) and Roederer (500,000 rubles).

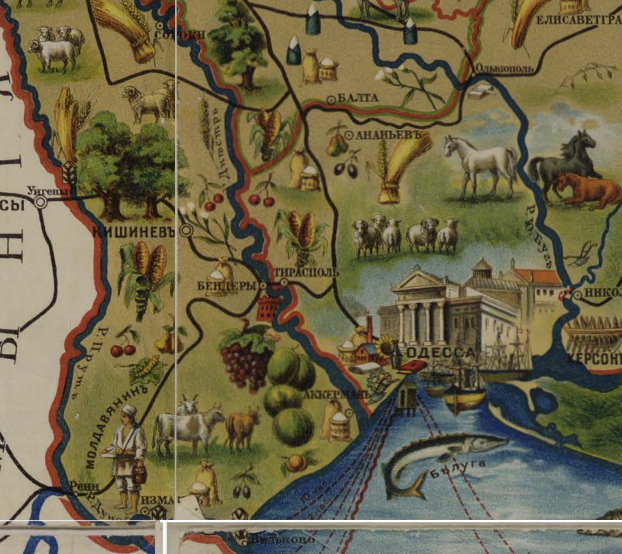
Visual map of European Russia, Odesa Oblast, 1896

After the start of the Great War and the Russian Revolution in 1914–1922, plantations were massively destroyed, but from the mid-1920s, during the New Economic Policy (NEP) policy and later, wine making was partially restored until 1936. In 1931, the People's Commissariat of Land Affairs of the Ukrainian SSR appropriated the winery named after V. Tairov on the Sukhyi Estuary to the Institute of Viticulture and Wine making. At the same time, it was actually forbidden to cite and popularize scientists, breeders, and specialists who developed wine making in Odesa until 1917.

After the Second World War and collectivization, there was a decline in production again. Already in the 1950s and until the end of the 1970s, the rise of the wine industry began.

A new segment of the rapid development of wine making in Odesa Oblast occurred in the 1960s: then the area of our vineyards almost equaled those of Moldova and "Odessovkhozvintrest," which united 26 wine state farms and 13 wineries, and produced as many products as Crimean associations. At the end of the 1980s of the last century, the Odesa region produced 3.2 million litres of wine, and more than 10 million bottles of champagne were produced.

Viticulture in Odesa region reached its greatest development in 1981–1985: 18,500 hectares of new vineyards were planted. Vineyards occupied 2% of the area of agricultural land in the region, at the same time they provided 15% of cash receipts and up to 25% of profit from the sale of plant products.

Prohibition of perestroika led to the mass extermination of the wine industry. According to economists' calculations, in 1985–1990, Odesa Oblast lost almost 1 billion dollars in the grape and wine-making complex. Over the past thirty years, the area of grape plantations has decreased by more than 2.5 times. Gross turnover also decreased by 2.2 times. Over the past thirty years, more than 50,000 hectares of vineyards in the Odesa Oblast have been uprooted.

Since 2023, numerous wines from Odesa Oblast have geographical indication protection in Ukraine, including Chabag and Acha-Abag (from Shabo), Prydunaiska Bessarabia, Yapluh, and Frumushika Valley.

== Climate and geology ==
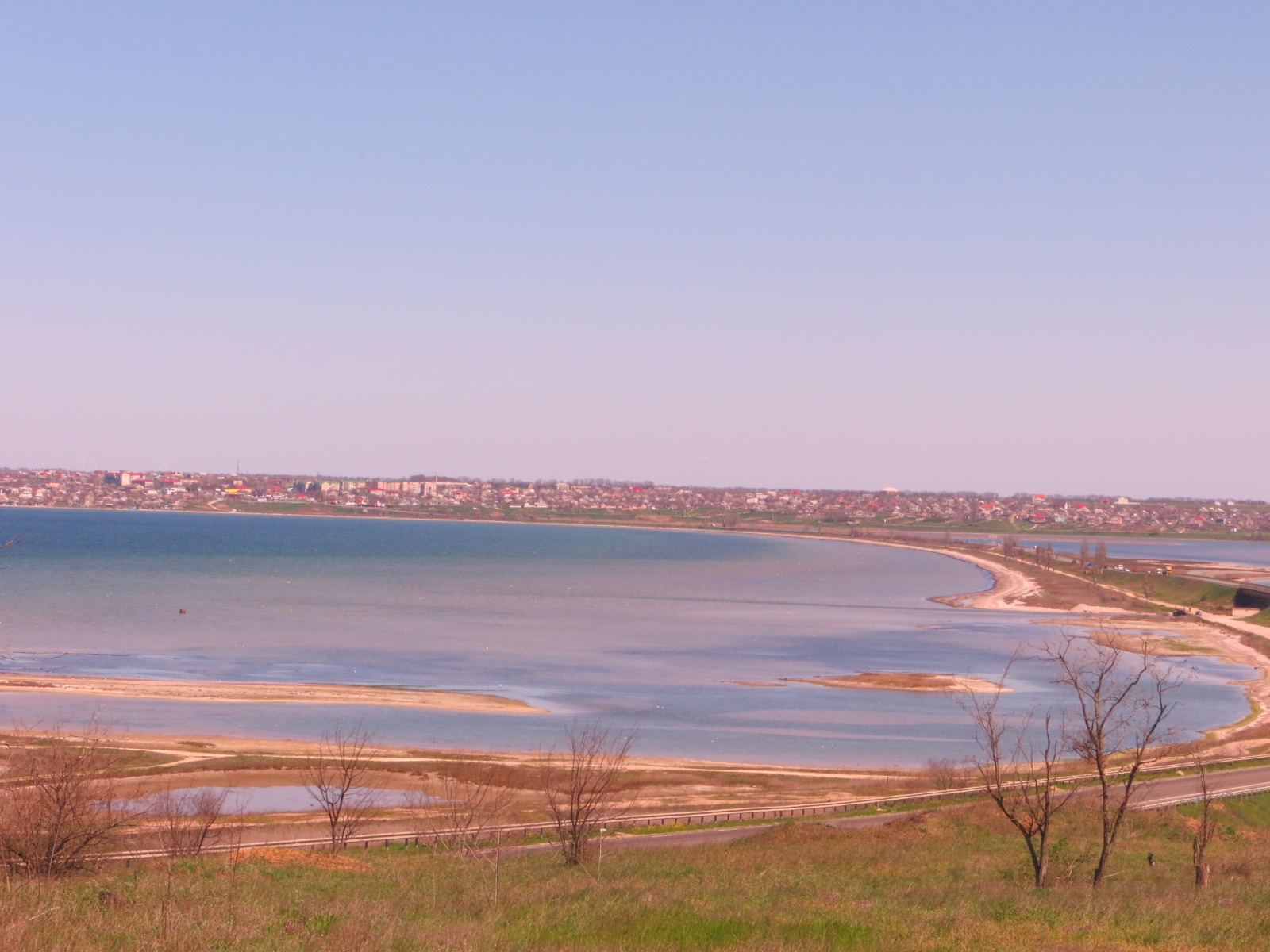
Tylihul Estuary

The natural and climatic conditions of the southern regions of Odesa Oblast are favorable for growing grapes.

The territory of the Odesa region stretches in the meridional direction from 45°11' to 48°12' north latitude.

The climate is humid and temperate. In general, the climate of the Odesa region combines continental and maritime features. Winter is mild, with little snow and unstable; the average January temperature is from −2 °C in the south to −5 °C in the north. Spring is characterized by gloomy weather and fog due to the cooling effect of the sea.

Summer is mostly hot and dry; the average temperature in July is from 21 °C in the northwest to 23 °C in the south, maximum up to 36–39 °C (more in recent years). Autumn is long, warmer than spring, and mostly cloudy. The average annual temperature ranges from 8.2 °C in the north to 10.8 °C in the south of the region.

The total amount of precipitation is 340–470 mm per year, mainly falling in summer (often in the form of showers). The number of hours of sunlight is approximately 2200 per year. The duration of the growing season is 168–210 days with the total temperature from 28 °C to 34 °C.

North and south-west winds prevail in winter, north-west and north in summer. The southern half of the region is prone to droughts, dust storms, and dry winds.

=== Soil and climatic zones ===
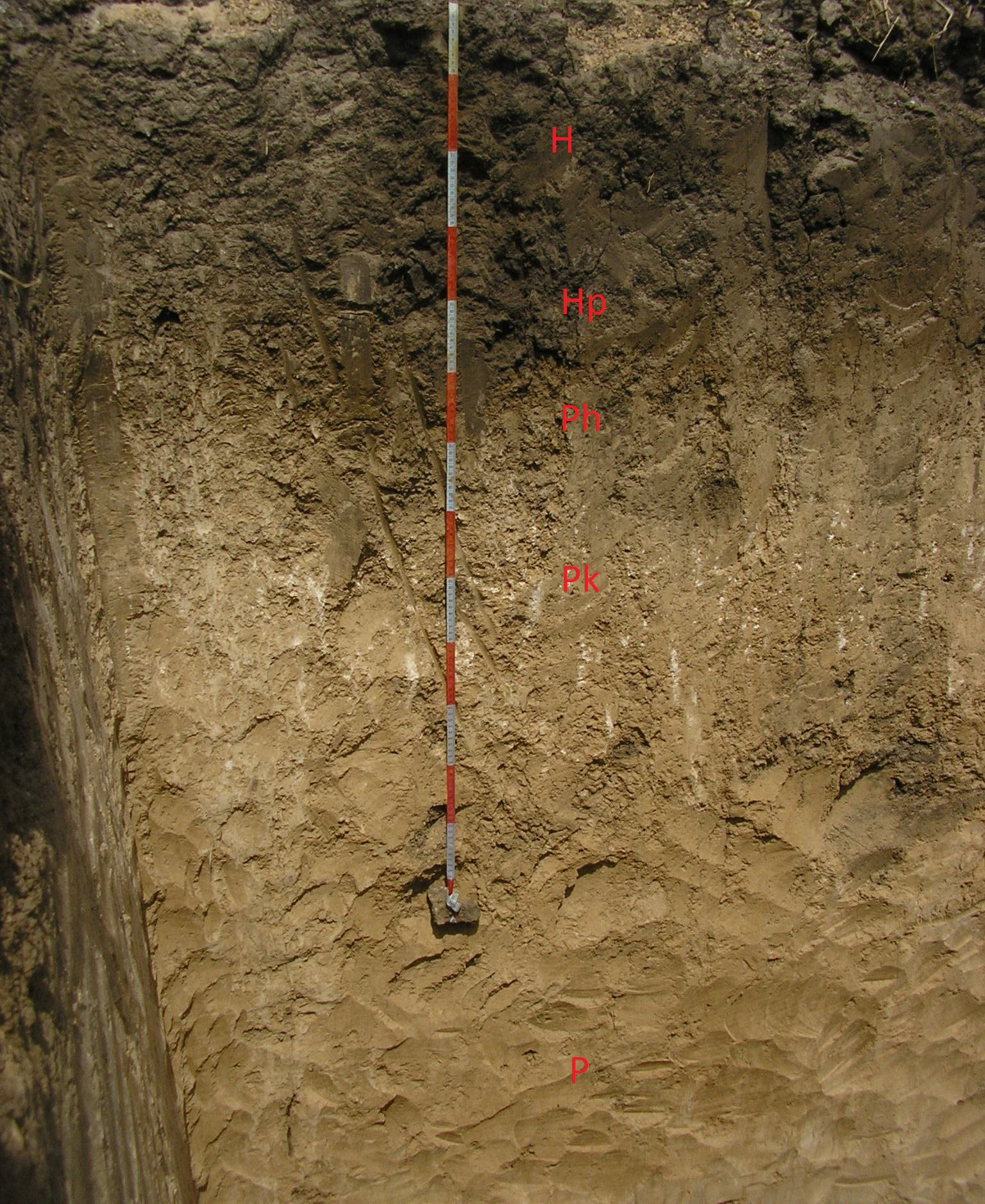
Profile of the southern chernozem in the territory of Lyman district of Odesa Oblast

The main types of wine making soils in the Odesa region are southern chernozems and ordinary chernozems.

Vineyards located on ordinary chernozems occupy an area of 25,873 hectares – 66.4%, and on southern chernozems – 13,076 hectares – 33.6%.

The Odesa region is divided into the western forest-steppe elevated wide-wave, Tiligulo-Kuchurgan, Dniester-Tiligul, Transnistrian floodplain, Odesa plain, central wide-wave, and Bolgrad natural-vine soil and climate zones.

- The western forest-steppe elevated broad-wave soil-climatic zone is located on ordinary chernozems, which includes the Bereziv and Velikomykhailiv administrative districts. The main wine making is from table grapes, and technical varieties for the production of table wines and champagne.
- The Tiligulo-Kuchurganska, Dniester-Tiligulska, Pridnestrovska floodplain, and Odesa plain soil-climatic zone is located on ordinary and southern chernozems. It is attributed to the Tarutynskyi, Bilhorod-Dnistrovskyi, Saratskyi, Rozdilnianskyi, Bilyaivskyi, and Ovidiopolskyi districts. This zone has favorable conditions for the production of table grapes, as well as the production of champagne and cognac wines, and table dry and semi-dry table wines.
- The central broad-wave soil-climatic zone is located on ordinary and southern micellar-carbonate chernozems. It is located in the Artsyzsky, Saratsky and central parts of the Bilhorod-Dniester district, and the Tatarbunarsky south-eastern part of the Bilhorod-Dniester district on chernozem micellar-carbonate, turf-sandy and clay-sandy soils. This zone has favorable conditions for the winemaking of table wines, champagne and cognac wines, strong and dessert wines.
- The Bolgrad natural grape soil-climatic zone refers to the Bolgrad region, the southern part of the Rheny region, the eastern and western Izmail regions on southern micellar carbonate chernozems, as well as the Kili region without the Danube region. It also includes the Danube floodplain natural grape-growing region with the Danube parts of the Izmail, Kili, and Reniya districts on chernozems of southern micellar carbonate and alluvial turf soils in the Danube floodplain.

Area of vineyards by soil type
Raion	Area in hectares	Soil groups	
Raion	Area in hectares	Ordinary chernozems	Southern chernozems
Artsyzky Raion	2215	2215	–
Bilhorod-Dnistrovskyi Raion	3931	2026	1905
Bilaivsky Raion	1156	1156	–
Bolhradsky Raion	6990	5380	1610
Velyka Mykhailivka Raion	167	167	–
Izmail Raion	1756	–	1756
Kiliia Raion	1801	–	1801
Ovidiopol Raion	2534	176	2358
Rozdilna Raion	1543	1543	–
Reni Raion	1988	–	1988
Sarata Raion	5035	5035	–
Tarutyne Raion	7305	7305	–
Tatarbunary Raion	2528	870	1658
Total in Odesa Oblast	38949	25873	13076

=== Heat zones ===
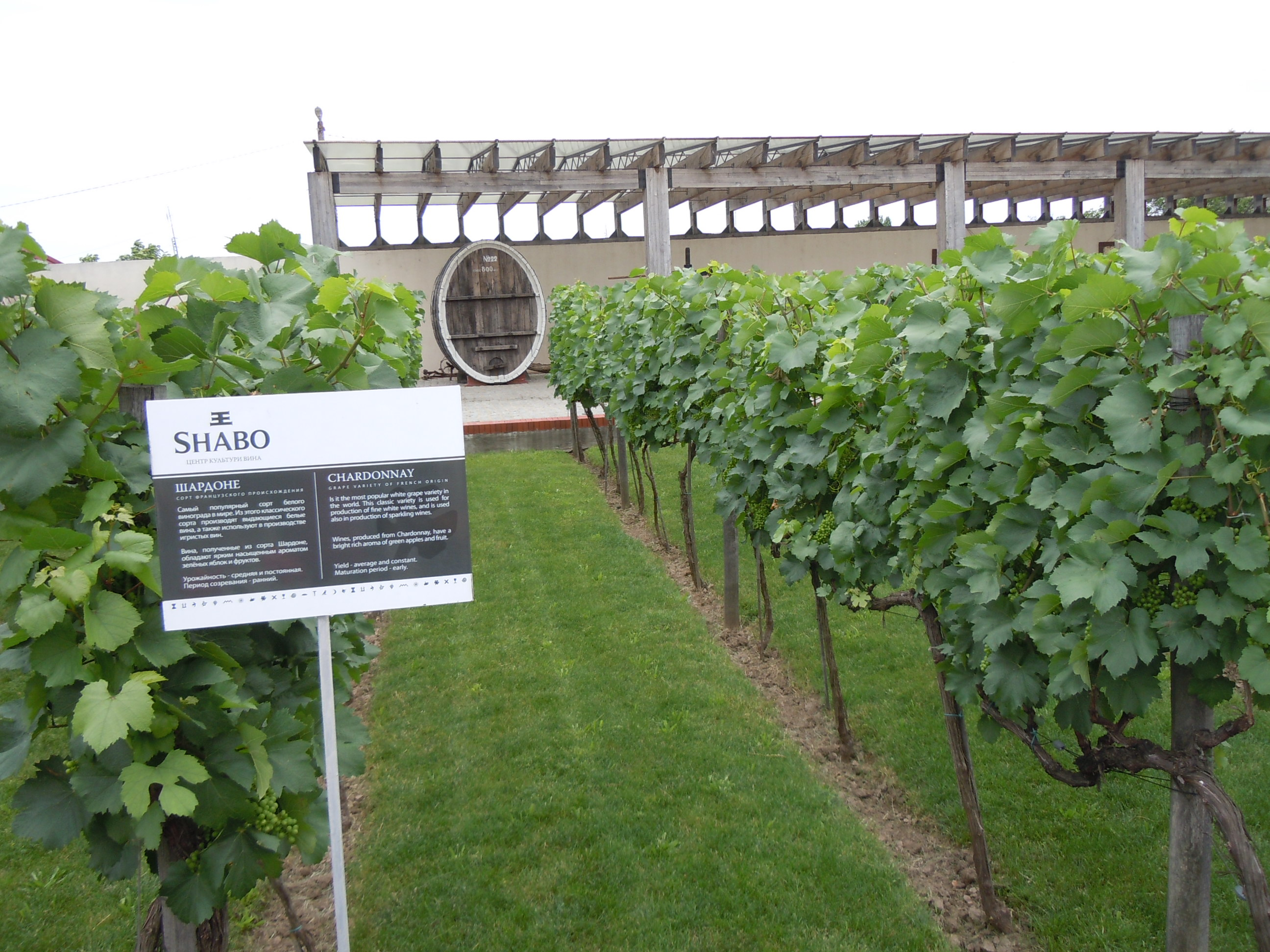
Shabo 05

Heat supply cumulative temperatures are 3000–3500 °C. In 2016, the largest areas of vineyards were located in this heat supply zone: 37,239 hectares – 95.6%. In the zone up to 3000 °C there is a small area of grape plantations – 1700 hectares – 4.4%.

Odesa Oblast is divided into four regions: the northern region is moderately warm, the first central region is warm, the second central region is very warm, and the southern region is hot. Grape production is located in the second central, very warm and southern hot regions of Odesa region.

== Grape varieties ==
As of August 1, 2008, the range of vineyards in the Odesa Region is represented by 82 varieties, including 42 technical (for wine production) and 40 table varieties. Of these, 49 varieties are zoned, occupying 29.7 thousand hectares or 76% of the area of vineyards in this region. Technical varieties cover more than 90% of vineyards, of which Aligoté – 16.2%, Cabernet Sauvignon – 13.1, Rkatsiteli – 7.4, Odesa Black – 6.0, Merlot – 5.7, Chardonnay – 5.3, and Green Sauvignon – 4.7. The Golubok grape variety was first cultivated in Odesa.

Area of technical grape varieties
№	Variety	Area, hectares (Ukraine)	Area, % (Ukraine)	Area, hectares (Odesa Oblast)
	Total	84609.1	x	38939
	Area of technical varieties totals:	72710.2	100%	35130.3
1	Aligot	9626.5	13.24%	5683.7
2	Antey of Magaratsky	5.1	0.01%	2.9
3	Bastardo Magaratsky	1330.4	1.83%	178.7
4	Bianca	733.8	1.01%	153.3
5	Viorika	17.8	0.08%	8.2
6	Holubok	233.7	0.32%	182.8
7	Grenache White	1.1	0.00%	1.1
8	Seibel	37.0	0.05%	37.0
9	Illichivsky Rahniy	6.0	0.01%	6.0
10	Cabernet Sauvignon	8468.5	11.65%	4294.7
11	Lancelot	13.1	0.02%	13.1
12	Lydia	270.2	0.37%	2.8
13	Merlo	2819.9	3.88%	2018.0
14	Muscat Blanc à Petits Grains	673.9	0.93%	96.5
15	Black Muscat	49.3	0.07%	20.1
16	Muscat Livadia	1.2	0.00%	1.2
17	Odesa Muscat	346.3	0.48%	165.4
18	Muscat Ottonel	590.8	0.81%	321.2
19	Odesa Black	2426.3	3.34%	2109.0
20	Ozhibi	11.0	0.02%	11.0
21	Perevenets Maharacha	642.8	0.88%	26.3
22	Pinot blanc	338.2	0.47%	53.4
23	Pinot minye	43.1	0.06%	43.1
24	Pinot gris	637.0	0.88%	518.3
25	Pinot noir	767.1	1.06%	415.8
26	Podarok Maharacha	212.0	0.29%	3.0
27	Risus	94.2	0.13%	7.2
28	Riesling	2702.0	3.72%	842.0
29	Rkatsiteli	11552.4	15.89%	2593.8
30	Rubin Holodrihi	51.4	0.07%	8.4
31	Rubin Takhrovsky	11.8	0.02%	7.8
32	Saperavi	1546.1	2.13%	397.9
33	Sereksiya	1.0	0.00%	1.0
34	Silvaner	107.4	0.15%	17.1
35	Sira	17.2	0.02%	1.1
36	Sauvignon Blanc	953.0	1.31%	953.0
37	Sauvignon green	2691,1	3.70%	1651,4
38	Sukholimansky Blanc	1477.4	2.03%	1204.8
39	Tellty Kuruk	245.7	0.34%	245.7
40	Traminer Rozhevy	961.1	1.32%	407.1
41	Fetyaska Bila (Leanka)	1451.3	2.00%	991.0
42	Chardonnay	2984.6	4.10%	1844.3
	Hybrids	6735.2	9.26%	6735.2
	Others and mixed varieties	3797	5.22%	554.9

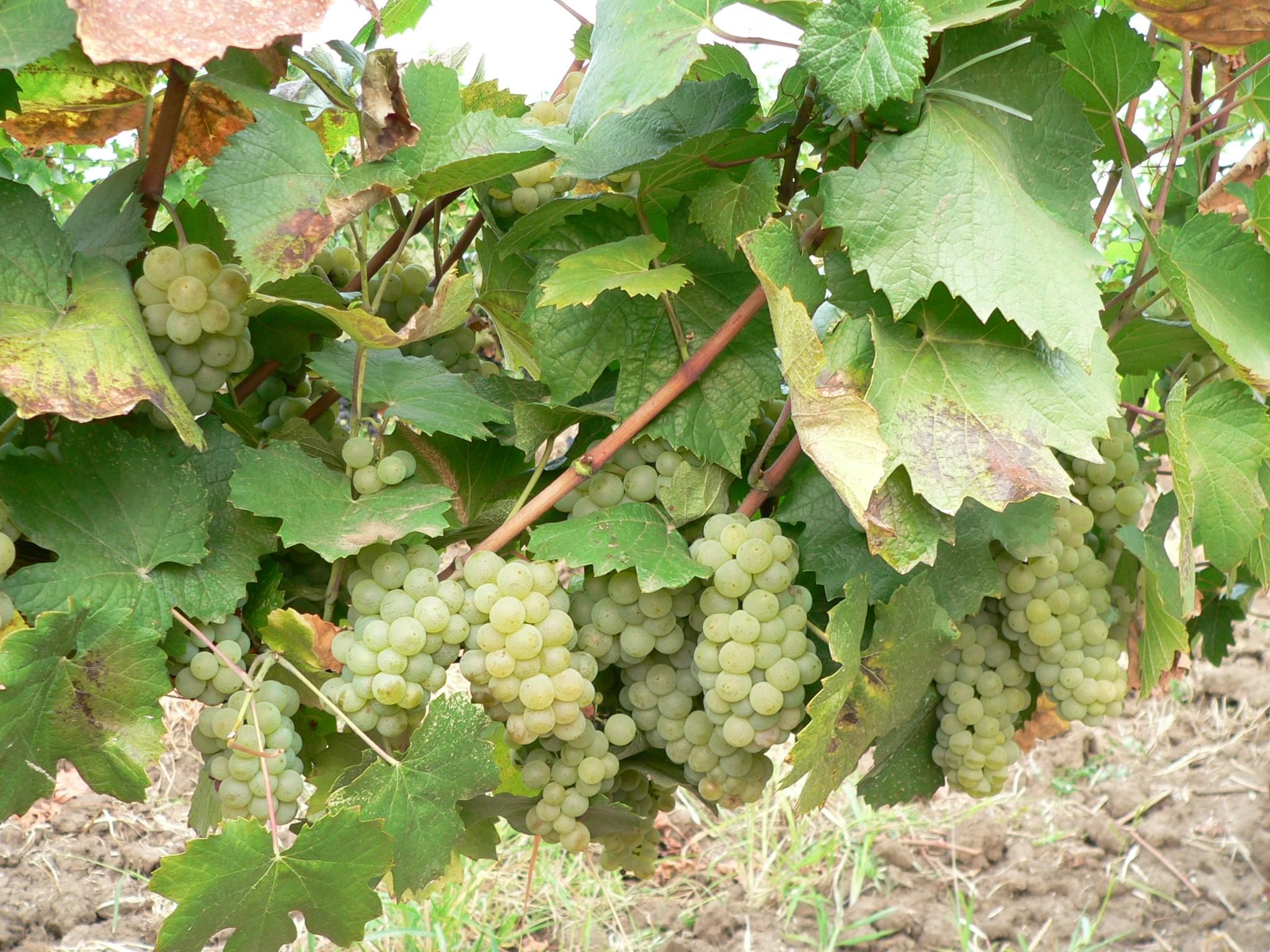
Aligote

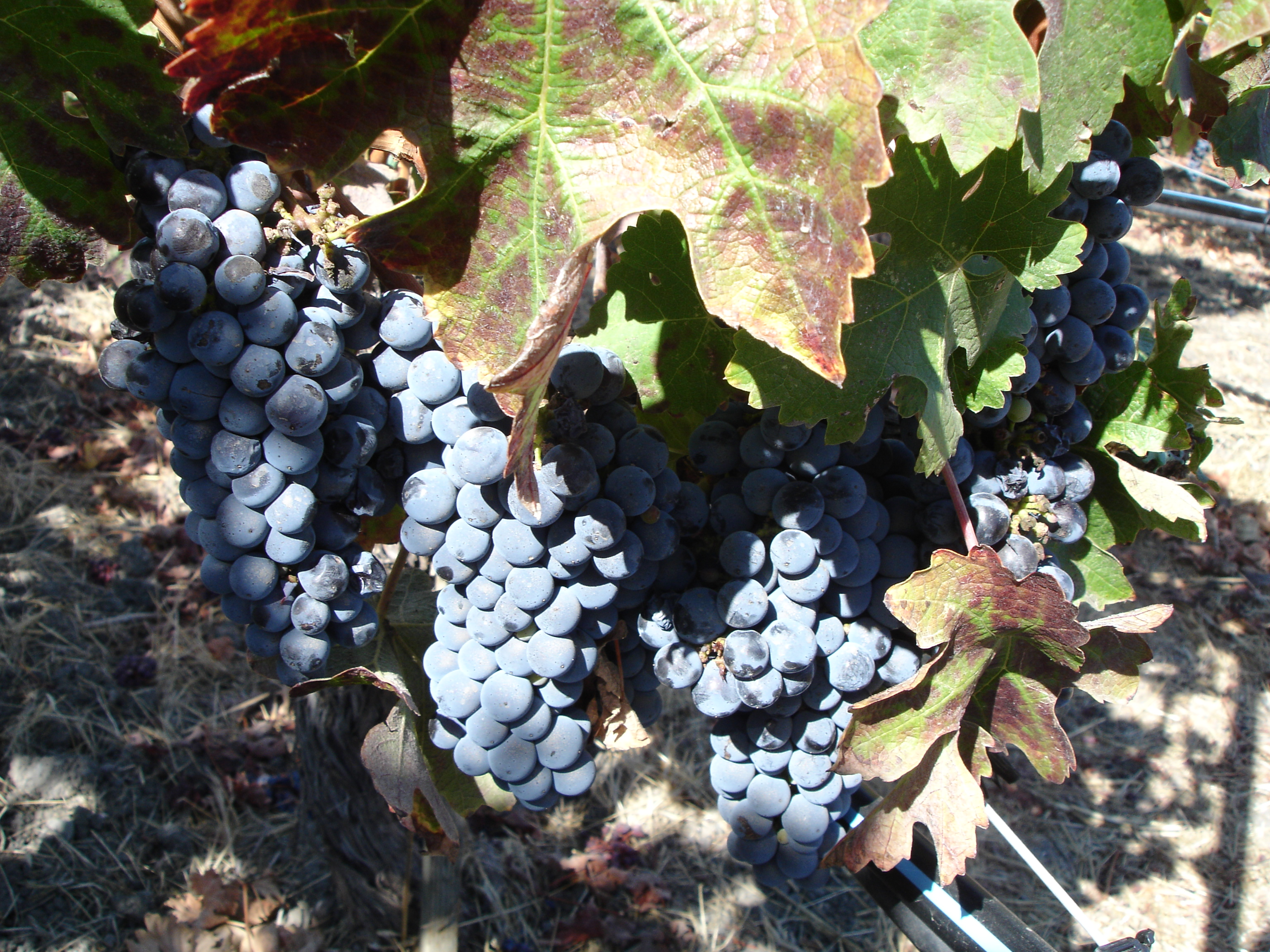
Cabernet Sauvignon

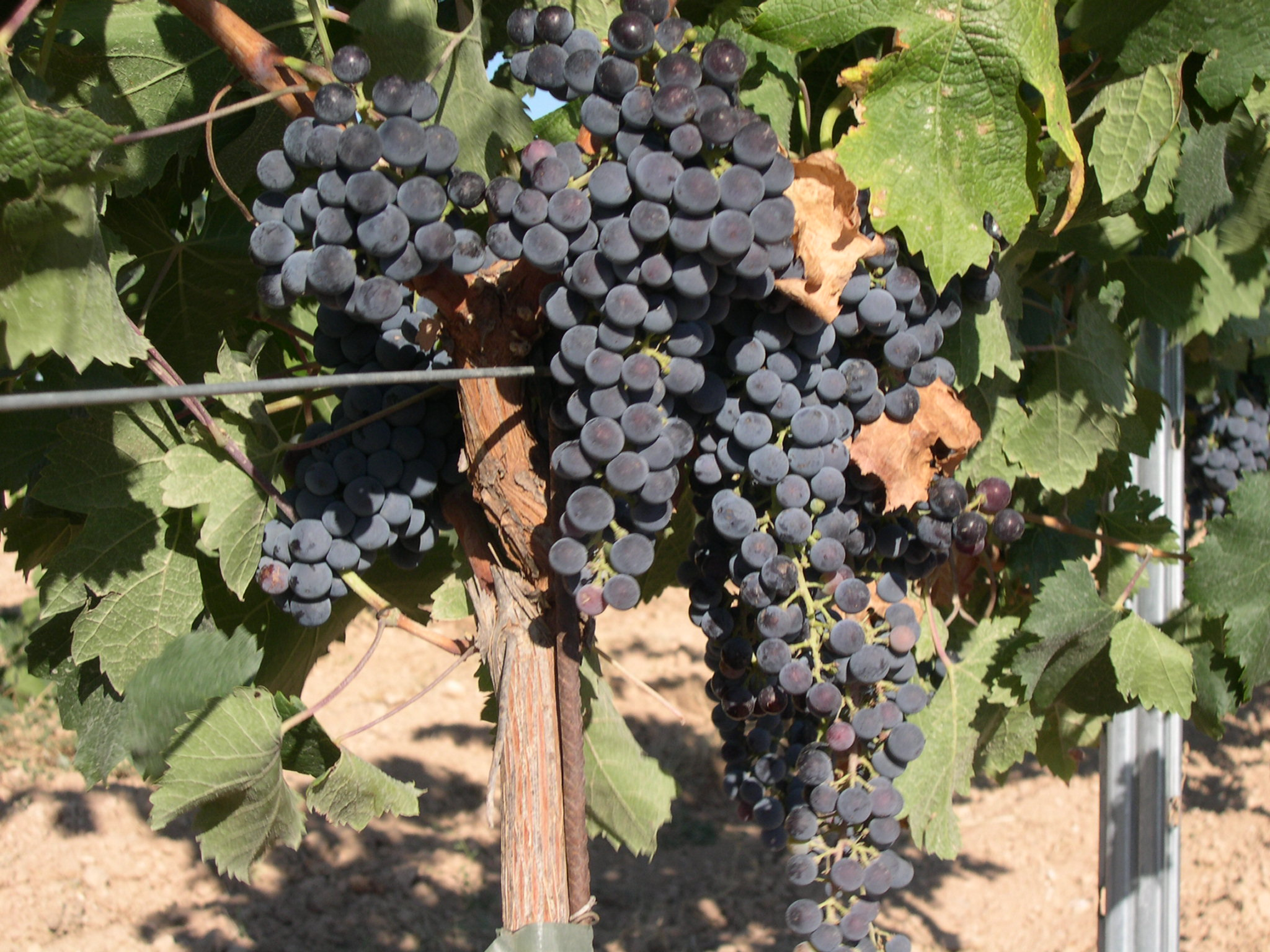
Merlo

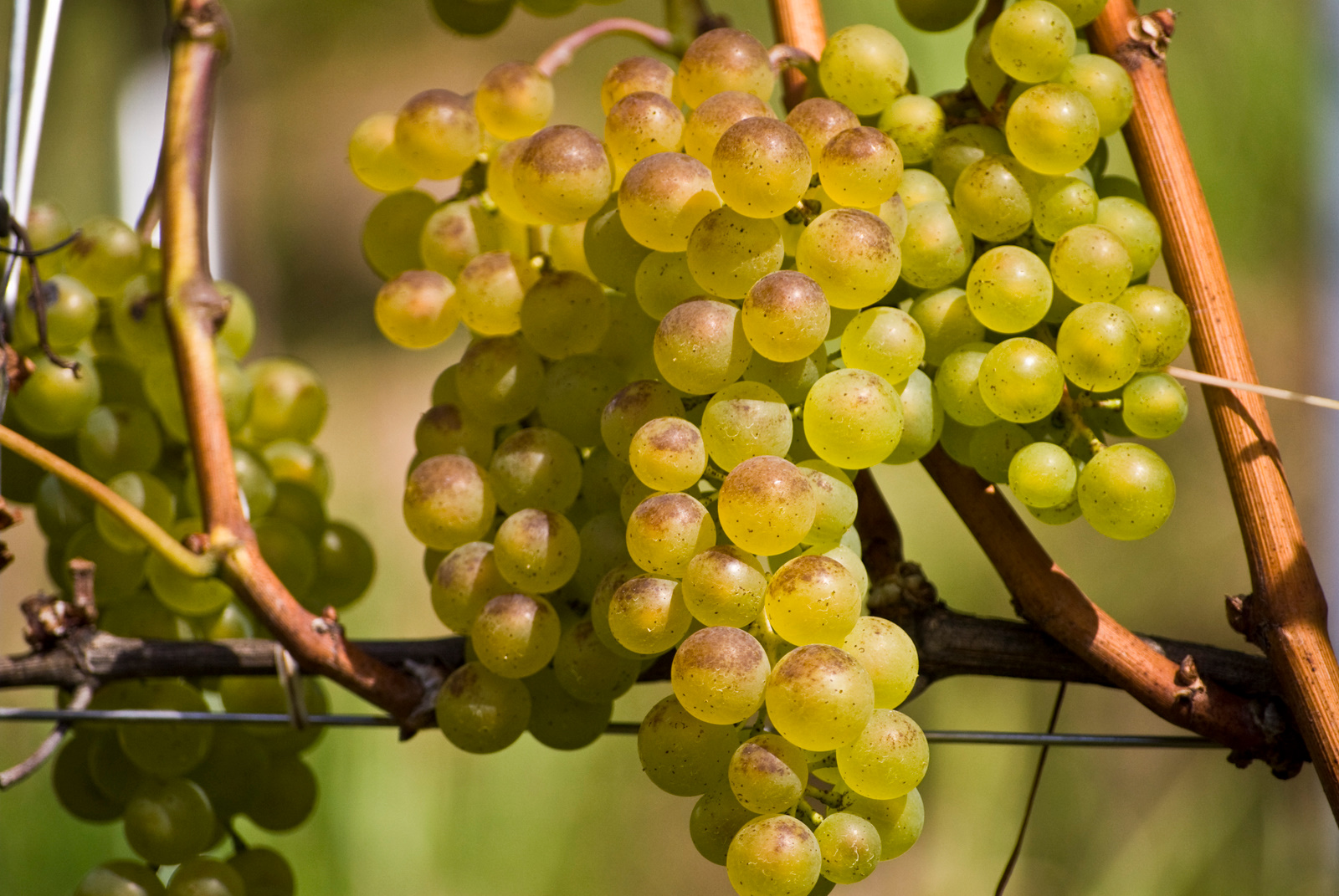
Bianca

Area of table grape varieties
№	Type	Area, hectares (Ukraine)	Area, % (Ukraine)	Area, hectares (Odesa Oblast)
	Total table varieties:	11898.9	100%	3818.7
1	Alphonse Lavallée	29.6	0.25%	29.6
2	Arcadia	300.4	2.52%	180.4
3	Atila	13.2	0.11%	13.2
4	Veresen	4.4	0.04%	4.4
5	Viktoriya	5.0	0.04%	5.0
6	Vostok	14.8	0.12%	1.0
7	Vostorh	208.0	1.75%	37.8
8	Hrochanka	57.4	0.48%	15.2
9	Dekabrsky	67.7	0.57%	37.7
10	Dnistrovsky Rozhevy	6.4	0.05%	6.0
11	Doyna	92.1	0.77%	92.1
12	Zorka	18.0	0.15%	18.0
13	Zolotysty Ustoychyvy	5.0	0.04%	5.0
14	Pearl of Csaba	10.0	0.08%	10.0
15	Isabella	74.0	0.62%	74.0
16	Irsai Olivér	271.1	2.28%	211.1
17	Italy	51.7	0.43%	51.7
18	Karaburnu	159.6	1.34%	15.7
19	Cardinal	399.7	3.36%	80.5
20	Kesha	66.7	0.56%	55.9
21	Codryanka	31.3	0.26%	1.5
22	Queen of Vineyards	239.5	2.01%	215.5
23	Krasunya Tsehleda	27.1	0.23%	27.1
24	Dream	8.7	0.07%	8.7
25	Moldova	2489.9	20.93%	964.4
26	Muscat Hamburg	1023.3	8.60%	149.4
27	Muscat Pearl	22.6	0.19%	22.6
28	Muscat Italy	877.7	7.38%	53.6
29	Muscat Tayirovsky	35.9	0.30%	34.5
30	Muscat Yantarny	676.9	5.69%	171.1
31	Odesa Early	72.7	0.61%	72.7
32	Odesa Souvenir	249.5	2.10%	166.6
33	Original	10.8	0.09%	10.8
34	Early Maharacha	853.2	7.17%	412.8
35	Strashensky	17.2	0.14%	3.6
36	Suruchensky White	149.8	1.26%	79.7
37	Tavria	69.3	0.58%	12.3
38	Talisman	5.2	0.04%	3.0
39	Chaush Chornokrymsky	24.2	0.20%	6.0
40	Chasla White	242.9	2.04%	138.3
	Collection of table varieties	25.1	0.21%	25.1
	Other & mixed varieties	1203.6	10.12%	294.1

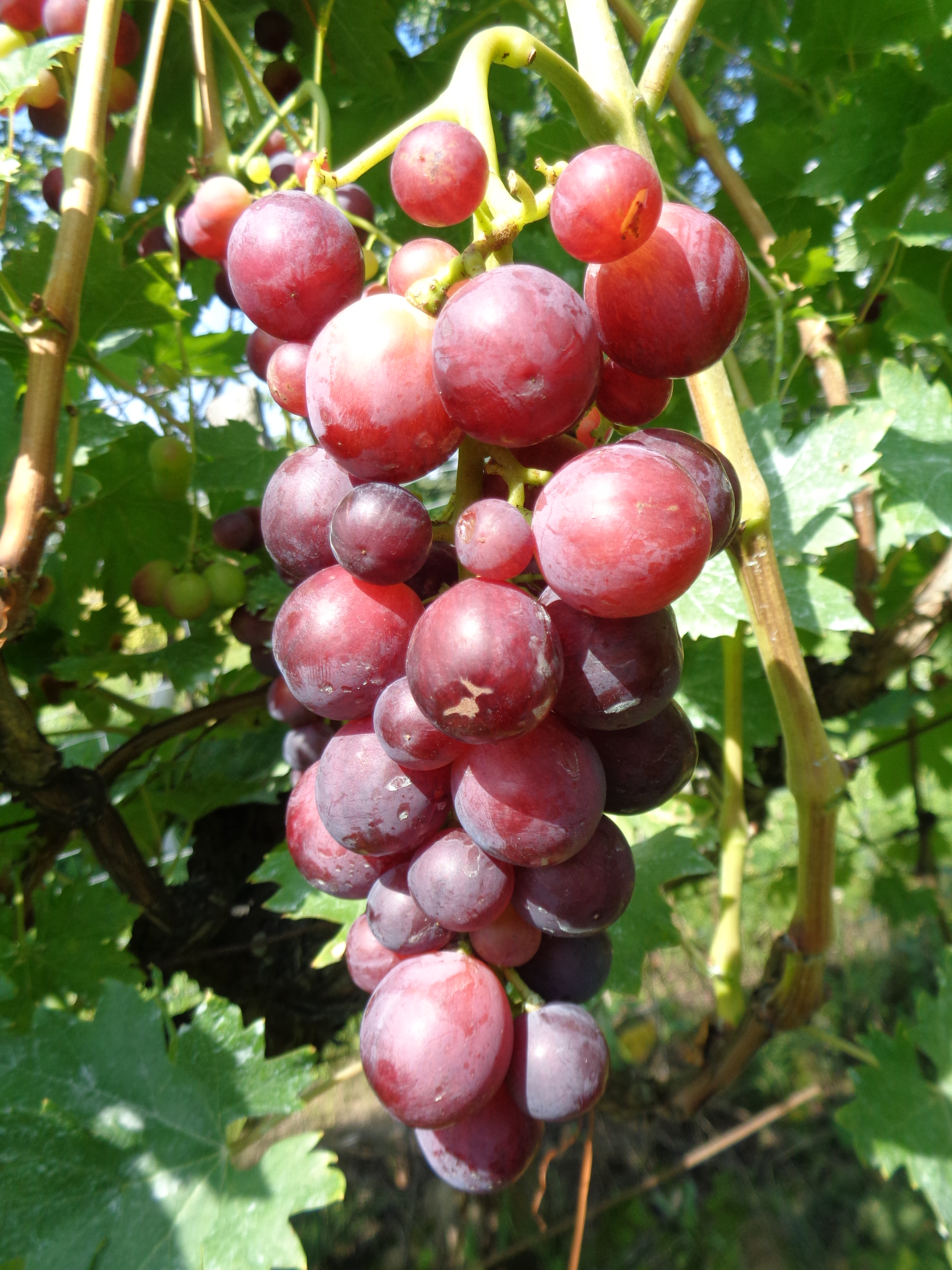
Cardinal

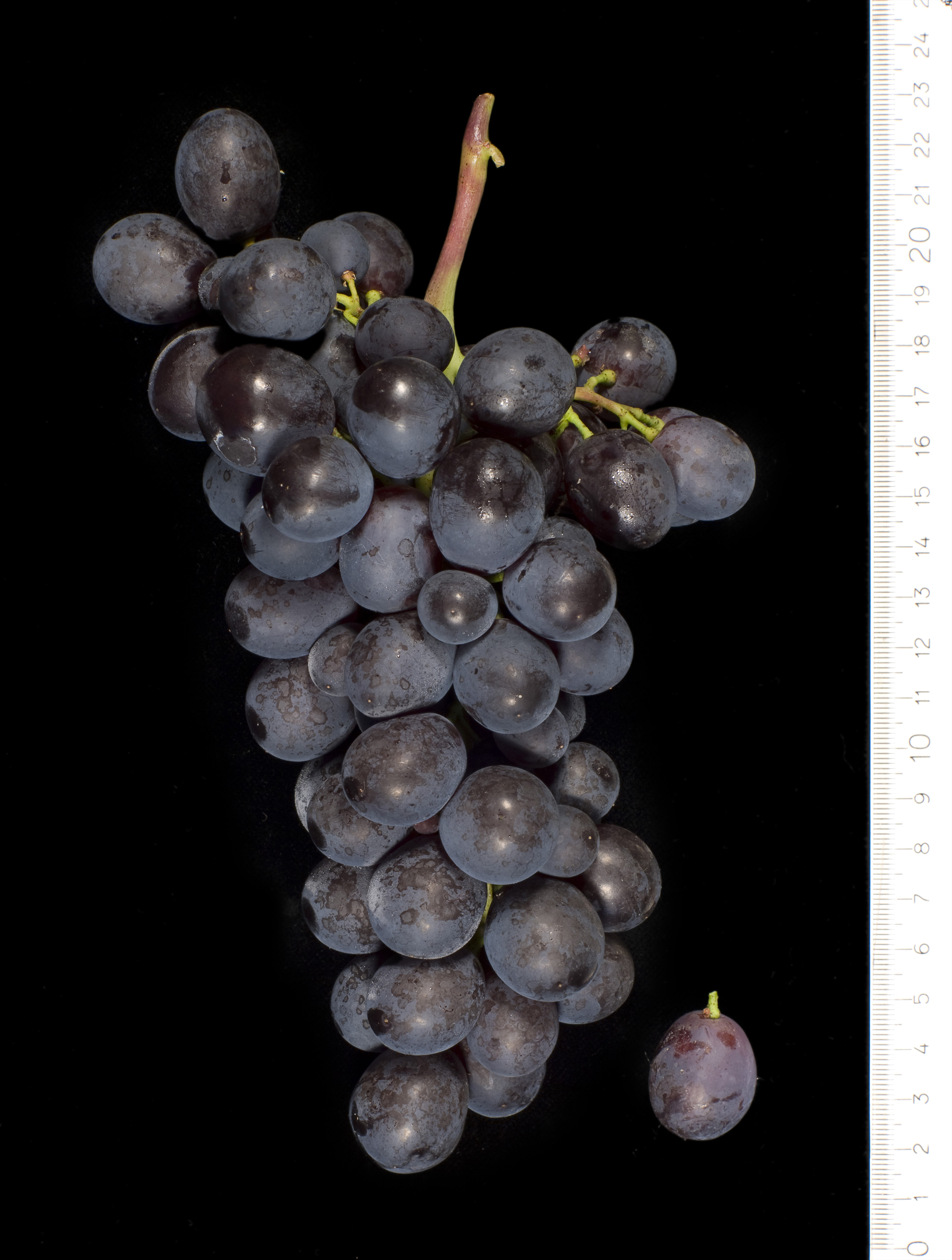
Muscat Hamburg

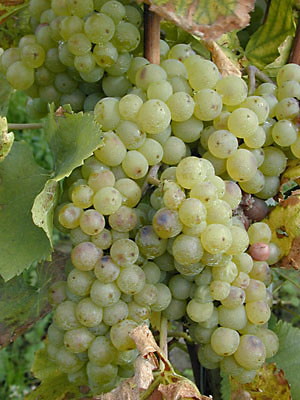
Chasla White

=== Area of vineyards ===
As of 2015, the area of vineyards in Odesa Oblast is 38,949 hectares.

The largest areas with vineyards are in Tarutynskyi Raion – 7305 hectares, Bolhradskyi – 6990 hectares, Saratskyi – 5035 hectares, Bilhorod-Dnistrovskyi – 3931 hectares, smaller areas are located in Ovidiopolskyi – 2534 hectares, Reniyskyi – 1988 hectares, Artsyzskyi – 2215 hectares, Tatarbunarskyi – 2528 hectares, Kiliyskyi – 1801 hectares, Izmailskyi – 1756 hectares, Bilyaivskyi – 1156 hectares, Rozdilnianskyi – 1543 hectares, and Velikomykhailivskyi – 167 hectares.

Area of grape plantations in Odesa Oblast, hectares
Raion	Area	Including			
Raion	Area	Fruitful	Irrigated	Properly rooted	Grafted
Artsyz Raion	2215	1889	842	45	2170
Bilhorod-Dnistrovskyi Raion	3931	2639	29	307	3624
Biliaivka Raion	1156	988	–	929	227
Bolhrad Raion	6990	4806	266	692	6298
Velykamykhailivky Raion	167	163	–	107	60
Izmail Raion	1756	824	503	347	1409
Kiliia Raion	1801	1125	198	918	883
Ovidiopol Raion	2534	1790	388	123	2411
Rozdilna Raion	1543	1052	–	156	1387
Reni Raion	1988	1412	126	431	1557
Sarata Raion	5035	4316	–	770	4265
Tarutyne Raion	7305	4569	–	211	7094
Tatarbunary Raion	2528	1921	39	534	1994
Total for the oblast	38949	27494	2351	5570	33379

== Gallery ==
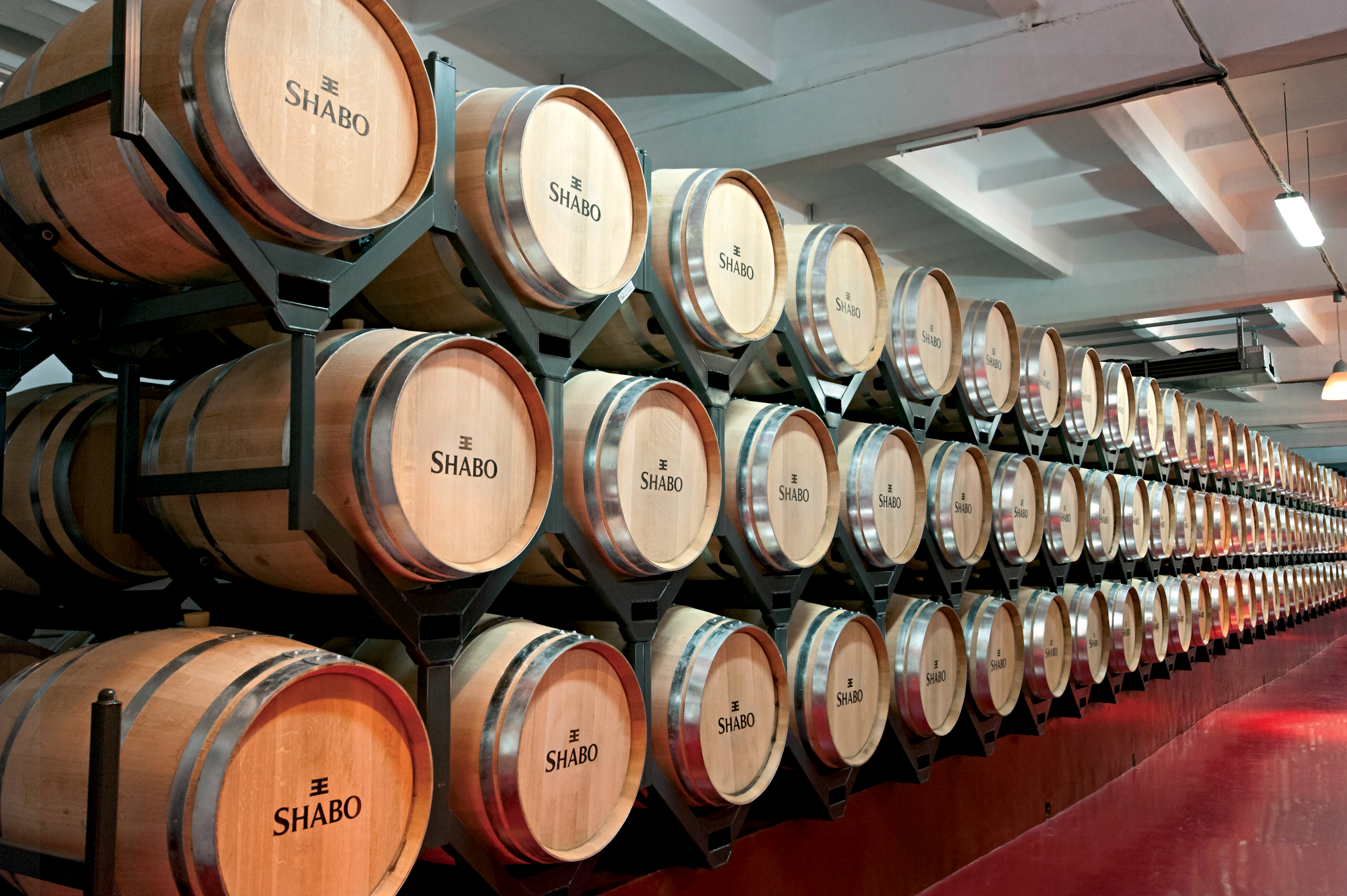
Shabo wine cellar

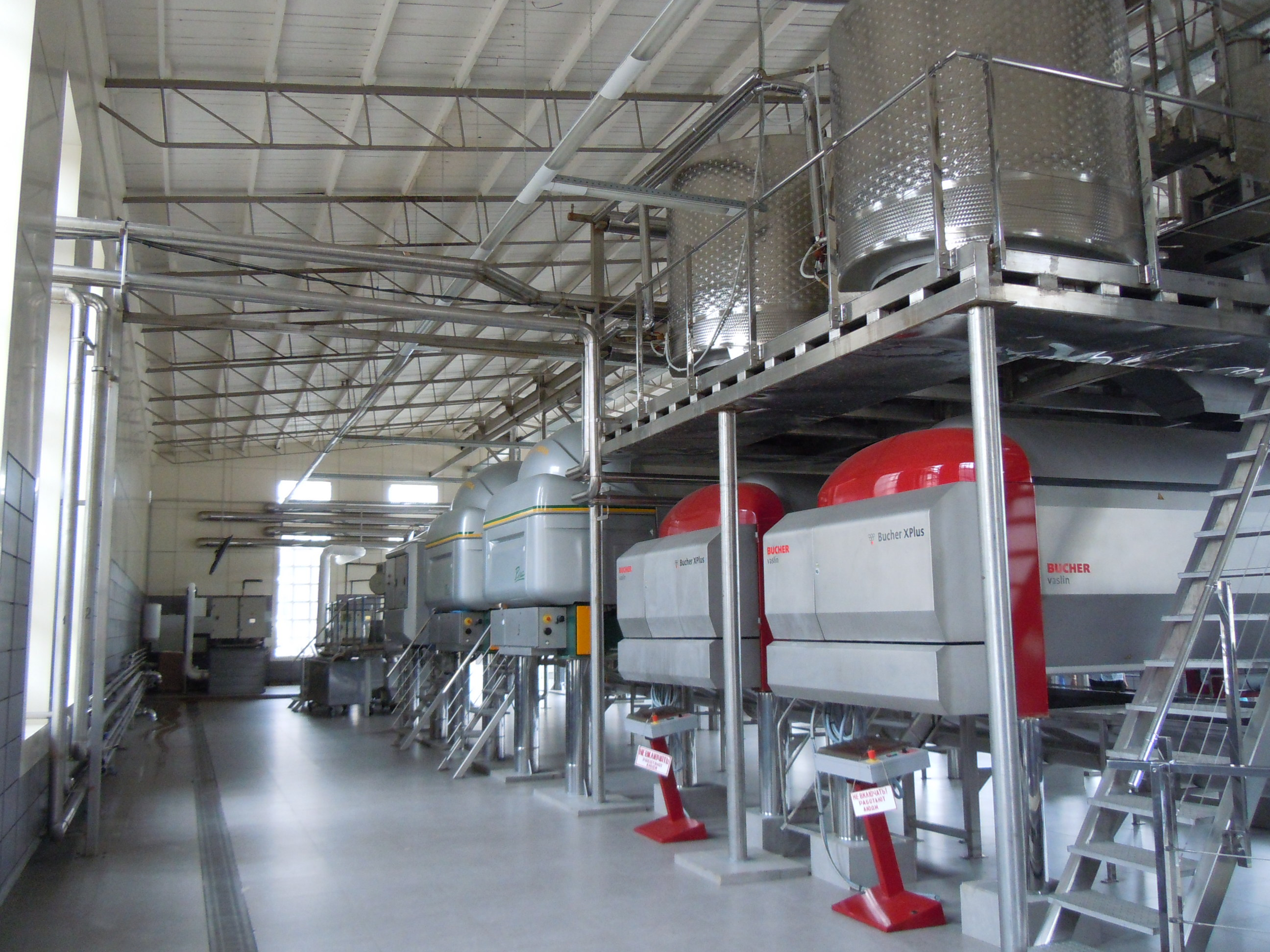
Wine Culture Center Shabo

== See also ==
- Ukrainian wine
- Shabo, Odesa Oblast
- Mikhail Reva

== Sources ==
- Міністерство аграрної політики України (2010). Виноградний кадастр України. Київ. p. 97.
- Одеська обласна державна адміністрація (2020). Паспорт Одеської області 2019 рік (PDF). Odesa. p. 76.
- Винокуров, Н. И. (2001). "Акклиматизация винограда и начальный этап развития виноградарства в Северном Причерноморье" (Боспорские исследования ed.). Симферополь: Крымское отделение Института востоковедения им. А. Е. Крымского: 4–22. Archived from the original on 14 January 2021.
- Куліджанов, Г. В. (2015). "Виноградний кадастр Одеської області і загальний стан виноградних насаджень". Виноградарство І Виноробство (52) (Виноградарство і виноробство ed.). Одеса: ННЦ «Інститут виноградарства і виноробства ім. В.Є.Таїрова»: 108–113. ISSN 0372-5847.
- Куліджанов, Г. В. (2016). "Ґрунти Одеської області, придатні для вирощування винограду". Вісник Харківського національного аграрного університету (2). Харків: Харківський національний аграрний університет ім. В. В. Докучаєва: 38–45. ISSN 2225-8701.
- Обнявко, В. О. (2020). "Стан та перспективу розвитку галузі виноградарства й виноробства в Одеській області" (PDF) (52) (Причорноморські економічні студії ed.). Одеса: Причорноморський науково-дослідний інститут економіки та інновацій: 93–99. doi:10.32843/bses.52-14. ISSN 2524-0897. S2CID 225964624. Archived from the original on 13 January 2021.
- Прилипко, А. (2014). "Наша золотая лоза. Винная карта одесского края" (PDF). Дерибасовская – Ришельевская. 58. Одесса: Всемирный клуб одесситов: 94–106. Archived from the original (PDF) on 13 January 2021.
