= Shabo rural hromada =

Shabo rural hromada Шабівська сільська громада
- Hromada
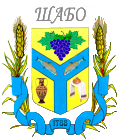
- Coat of arms
- Interactive map of Shabo rural hromada
- Coordinates: 46°05′15″N 30°17′50″E
- Country: Ukraine
- Oblast: Odesa Oblast
- Raion: Bilhorod-Dnistrovskyi Raion
- Admin. center: Shabo

Area
  - Total: 580.91 km^{2} (224.29 sq mi)

Population (2017)
  - Total: 14,321
  - Density: 24.653/km^{2} (63.850/sq mi)
- CATOTTG code: UA51040310000071545
- Settlements: 14
- Rural settlements: 1
- Villages: 13

Shabo rural hromada (Ukrainian: Шабівська сільська громада) is a hromada in Bilhorod-Dnistrovskyi Raion of Odesa Oblast in southwestern Ukraine. Population: 14,321 (2017 est.)

The hromada consists of obe rural settlement (Pryberezhne) and 13 villages:

- Abrykosove
- Avydivka
- Adamivka
- Bilenke
- Blahodatne
- Brytivka
- Cherkesy
- Poliove
- Pryvitne
- Salhany
- Shabo (seat of administration)
- Sofiivka
- Vyhon

== Links ==
- Шабівська сільська ОТГ // Облікова картка на офіційному вебсайті Верховної Ради України.
- Децентралізація влади: Шабівська сільська громада
- gromada.info: Шабівська об'єднана територіальна громада
- http://atu.minregion.gov.ua/ua/ustriy_page/1663174109611164719
