= Bilenke, Odesa Oblast =

Village in Odesa Oblast, Ukraine

Bilenke Біленьке
- Village
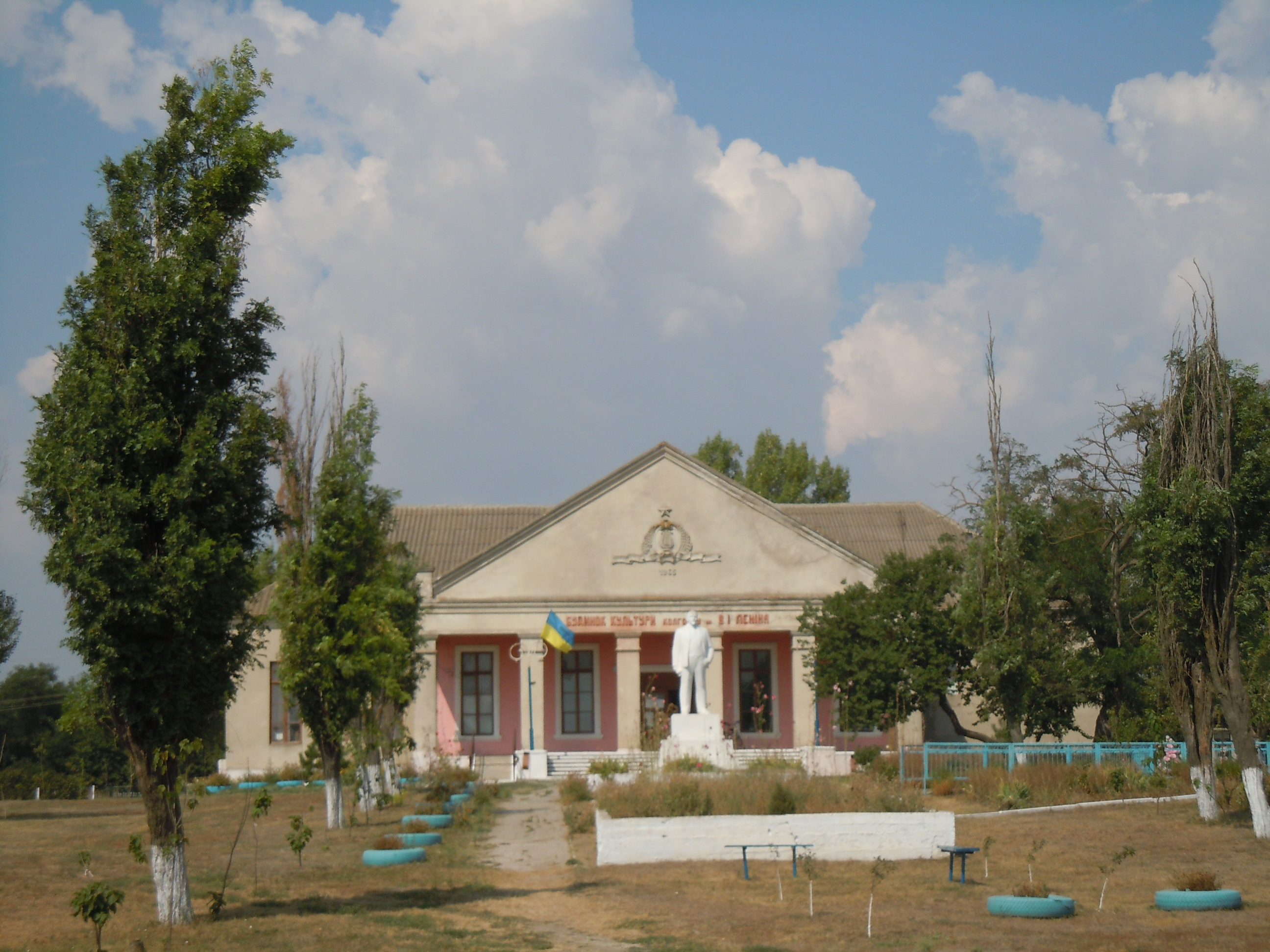
- House of Culture

- Location within Odesa Oblast Location within Ukraine
- Coordinates: 46°03′07″N 30°22′11″E
- Country: Ukraine
- Oblast: Odesa Oblast
- Raion: Bilhorod-Dnistrovskyi Raion
- Hromada: Shabo rural hromada
- Elevation: 0 m (0 ft)

Population (2001)
  - Total: 1,268
- Time zone: UTC+2 (EET (Kyiv))
  - Summer (DST): UTC+3 (EEST)
- Postal code: 67770
- Area code: +380 4849

Bilenke (Ukrainian: Біленьке; Turkish: Ak Kembet) is a village in Bilhorod-Dnistrovskyi Raion, Odesa Oblast (province) of Ukraine. It belongs to Shabo rural hromada, one of the hromadas of Ukraine.

The village's old name Ak Kembet (lit. 'White Tomb') derives from the nearby Akkembet Kurgan, a multi-layered kurgan (tumulus) with burials belonging to the Cucuteni–Trypillia, Usatove, Kemi Oba, and Yamnaya cultures.

== Demographics ==
Native language as of the Ukrainian Census of 2001:

- Ukrainian 81.15%
- Russian 14.35%
- Romani 1.5%
- Moldovan 1.26%
- Bulgarian 0.79%
- German 0.32%
- Gagauz 0.16%
- Belarusian 0.08%
