= Artsyz Raion =

Former subdivision of Odesa Oblast, Ukraine

Artsyz Raion Арцизький район
- Raion
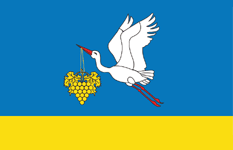
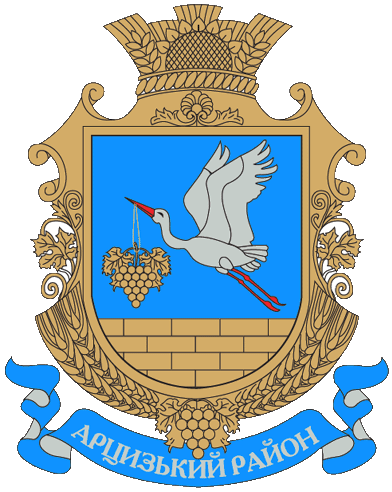
- Flag Coat of arms

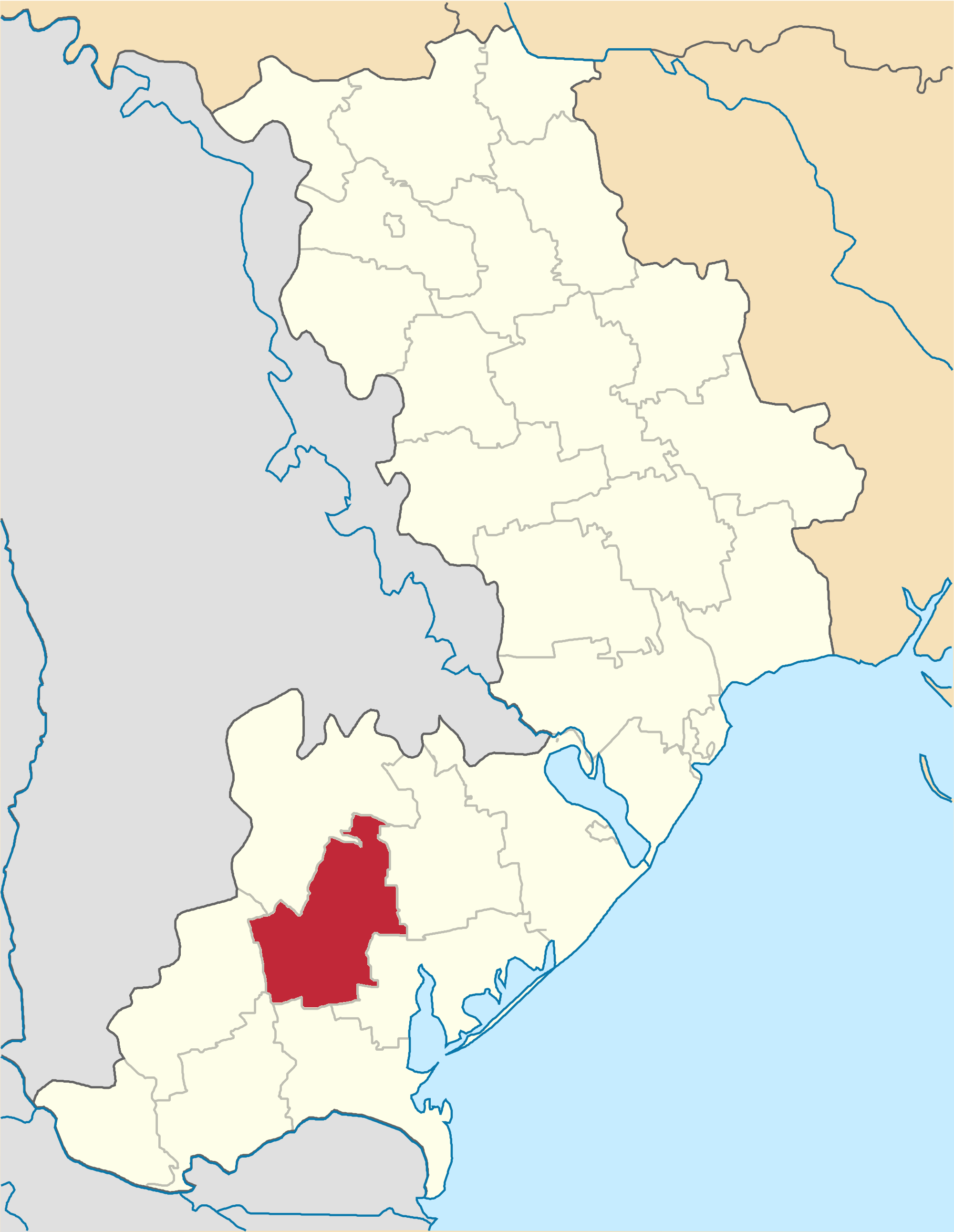
- Coordinates: 45°55′N 29°16′E
- Country: Ukraine
- Oblast: Odesa Oblast
- Established: 1967
- Disestablished: 18 July 2020
- Admin. center: Artsyz
- Subdivisions: List: 1 — city councils; 0 — settlement councils; 17 — rural councils; Number of localities: 1 — cities; 0 — urban-type settlements; 25 — villages; 1 — rural settlements

Government
  - Governor: Oleksandr Malev

Area
  - Total: 1,379 km^{2} (532 sq mi)

Population (2020)
  - Total: 43,774 ▼
  - Density: 31.74/km^{2} (82.21/sq mi)
- Time zone: UTC+2 (EET)
  - Summer (DST): UTC+3 (EEST)
- Postal index: 68400—68454
- Area code: +380 4845

Artsyz Raion (Ukrainian: Арцизький район) was a raion (district) in Odesa Oblast of Ukraine. It was part of the historical region of Bessarabia. Its administrative center was the city of Artsyz. The raion was abolished on 18 July 2020 as part of the administrative reform of Ukraine, which reduced the number of raions of Odesa Oblast to seven. The area of Artsyz Raion was merged into Bolhrad Raion. According to the 2001 census, its population was composed of speakers of Russian (42.79%), Bulgarian (33.98%), Ukrainian (18.24%), Romanian (3.08%) and Gagauz (0.83%). The last estimate of the raion population was 45,774 (2020 est.).

At the time of disestablishment, the raion consisted of three hromadas:

- Artsyz urban hromada with the administration in Artsyz;
- Pavlivka rural hromada with the administration in the selo of Pavlivka;
- Teplytsia rural hromada with the administration in the selo of Teplytsia.
