= Artsyz =

City in Odesa Oblast, Ukraine

Artsyz Арциз Arzis
- City
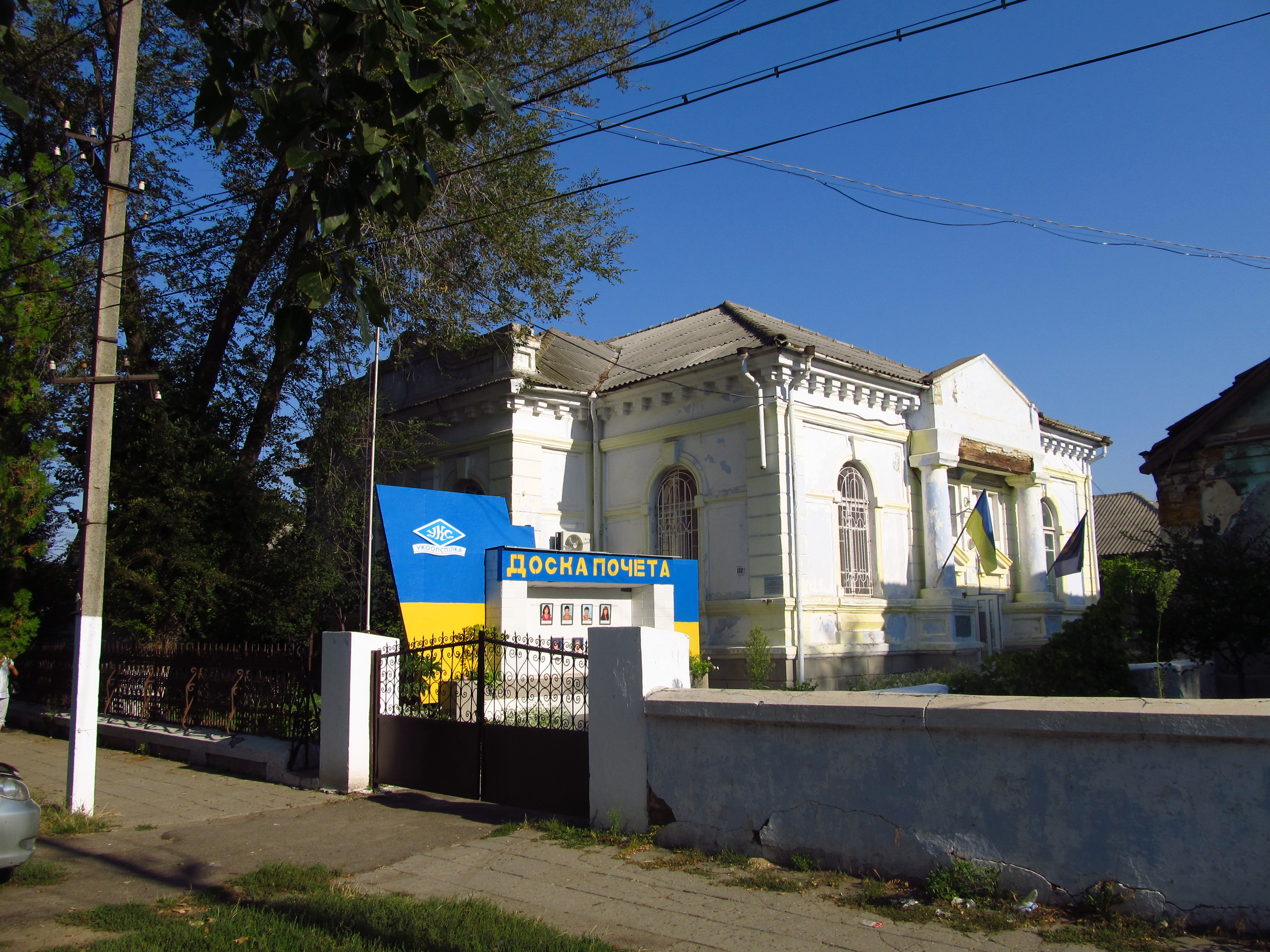

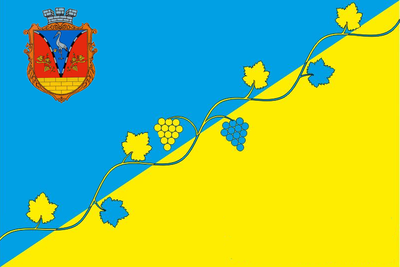
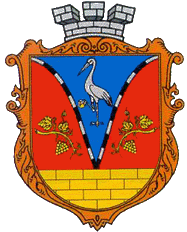
- Flag Coat of arms
- Interactive map of Artsyz
- Location in Ukraine Artsyz (Ukraine)
- Coordinates: 45°59′40″N 29°25′56″E
- Country: Ukraine
- Oblast: Odesa Oblast
- Raion: Bolhrad Raion
- Hromada: Artsyz urban hromada
- Founded: 1816

Government
  - Mayor: Jurij Mykhailov

Area
  - Total: 118 km^{2} (46 sq mi)
- Elevation: 16 m (52 ft)

Population (2025)
  - Total: 14,185
  - Density: 120/km^{2} (311/sq mi)
- Time zone: UTC+2 (EET)
  - Summer (DST): UTC+3 (EEST)
- Postal code: 68400-68409
- Area code: +380-4845
- Climate: Cfa

Artsyz (Ukrainian: Арциз, pronounced [ɐrˈtsɪz]; Bulgarian: Арциз, romanized: Artsiz; Romanian: Arciz; Turkish: Artsız or Arsız; German: Artzis or Arzis) is a city in Bolhrad Raion of Odesa Oblast, Ukraine. It hosts the administration of Artsyz urban hromada, one of the hromadas of Ukraine. Its population is 14,355 (2022 estimate). In 2001, the population was 16,370. In 2001, the city of Artsyz was 66.51% Russian-speaking, 22.57% Ukrainian-speaking, 7.9% Bulgarian-speaking, and 1.49% Romanian-speaking. The city had 16,268 inhabitants in 2001, of which 6,495 identified themselves as ethnic Ukrainians (39.92%), 5,258 as ethnic Russians (32.32%), 3,075 as Bulgarians (18.90%), 695 as Moldovans (4.27%) and 204 (1.25%), as Gagauz.

== Geography ==
In the northern part of the town of Balka Artyzka, it flows into the Chagu River.

== Etymology ==
Artsyz got its name from the French town of Arcis-sur-Aube, in Champagne, where a local military clash took place on March 20–21, 1814.

The town had various name options such as Arsis, Alt-Arsis, Artsyz or Ars-on-Chaga.

== History ==
Historical affiliations

Russian Empire 1816–1917
Moldavian Democratic Republic 1917–1918
Kingdom of Romania 1918–1940
Soviet Union 1940–1941
Kingdom of Romania 1941–1944
Soviet Union 1944–1991
Ukraine 1991–present

The city was founded in 1816 by German colonists from Swabia and the just dissolved Duchy of Warsaw and was named after the Battle of Arcis-sur-Aube. Steppe towns, founded by German settlers in the Odesa region in the 1810s-1830s, were named in memory of "victories of the Russian army" in the Napoleonic Wars. Such towns include Tarutino, Wittensburg, Borodino, Leipzig, Verchampenoise, Paris, Teplice, and others. As of 1886, the German colony, the center of the Artsyz Volost of the Akkerman County of the Bessarabia Governorate, had a population of 1,503, with 122 households. There was a prayer house, a post station, a shop, 2 inns, 2 restaurants, 2 taverns, and 2 wineries, and bazaars were held every two weeks on Tuesdays. The first inhabitants of Artsyz were German colonists from the Warsaw Duchy. They were granted significant privileges: each family received 60 desyatins of land, exemption from taxes for 50 years, and exemption from conscription forever. Agriculture and livestock farming developed rapidly.

Since August 24, 1991, Artsyz has been a part of independent Ukraine. On February 23, 2016, by the decision of the Artsyz City Council, in accordance with the law of Ukraine "On condemnation of the communist and national socialist (Nazi) totalitarian regimes in Ukraine and the prohibition of propaganda of their symbols," some streets in the city of Artsyz were renamed.

Until 18 July 2020, Artsyz was the administrative center of Artsyz Raion. The raion was abolished in July 2020 as part of the administrative reform of Ukraine, which reduced the number of raions of Odesa Oblast to seven. The area of Artsyz Raion was merged into Bolhrad Raion.

Artsyz was bombed on 3 May 2022 by Russian forces during the Russian invasion of Ukraine.

== Demographics ==
According to the 2001 Ukrainian census, Artsyz had a population of 16,268 inhabitants. The town is ethnically diverse. Ethnic Ukrainians constitute a plurality, followed by ethnic Russians, as well as Budjak Bulgarians and Moldovans. The Bessarabia German community almost entirely ceased to exist. The exact distribution of the population by ethnic composition was as follows:

Ethnic groups in Artsyz
	percent
Ukrainians	39.93%
Russians	32.32%
Bulgarians	18.90%
Moldovans	4.27%
Gagauz	1.25%
Belarusians	0.71%
Armenians	0.41%
Poles	0.14%
Jews	0.12%
Georgians	0.09%
