= Shabo, Ukraine =

Rural locality in Odesa Oblast, Ukraine

Shabo Шабо (Ukrainian) Șaba-Târg (Romanian)
- Village
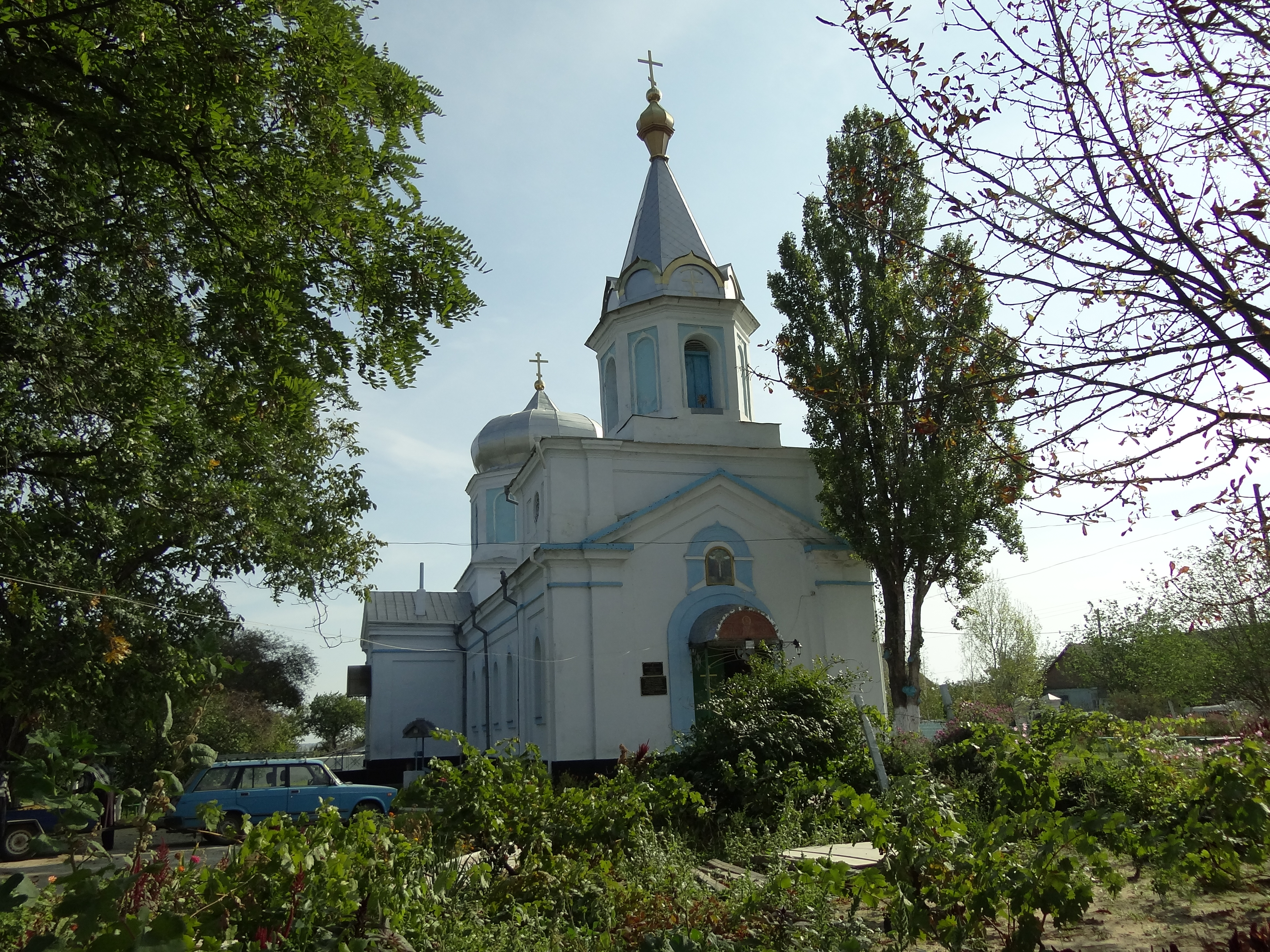
- St. Nicholas Church

- Location within Odesa Oblast Location within Ukraine
- Country: Ukraine
- Oblast: Odesa Oblast
- Raion: Bilhorod-Dnistrovskyi Raion
- Hromada: Shabo rural hromada

Population
  - Total: 7,100
- Time zone: UTC+2 (EET (Kyiv))
  - Summer (DST): UTC+3 (EEST)

Shabo (Ukrainian: Шабо; Romanian: Șaba-Târg or Șaba) is a village of Bilhorod-Dnistrovskyi Raion, Odesa Oblast, Ukraine, situated at the Dniester Liman, some 7 km downstream of Bilhorod-Dnistrovskyi. It hosts the administration of Shabo rural hromada, one of the hromadas of Ukraine.

== History ==
A Tatar village was established c. 1500, called Acha-abag "the lower vineyards" (attested 1788). The name was subsequently simplified to Shabag and finally to Shaba / Shabo. After the conquest of Bessarabia by the Russian Empire and its annexation by Russia in 1812, the region suffered a population drain to the Ottoman Empire. Shabo in 1812 had been deserted by all but three or four Moldavian families. Emperor Alexander I decided to re-populate the region, in 1822 inviting Swiss settlers from Vaud, led by Louis-Vincent Tardent, to cultivate vineyards at Shabo. The descendants of these settlers inhabit Shabo to the present day, and Shabo wine remains famous for its quality.

In 1889, the village Osnovy was founded in what is now southern Ukraine by settlers from Shabo. Osnovy became a significant grape plantation and winemaking site, where the wine was exported through the port of Brytany (present-day Dnipriany). Osnovy eventually merged into Dnipriany in 1957.

Since 2023, Shabo wines are protected in Ukraine as Chabag (Appellation of Origin) and Acha-Abag (Geographical Indication).

== Gallery ==
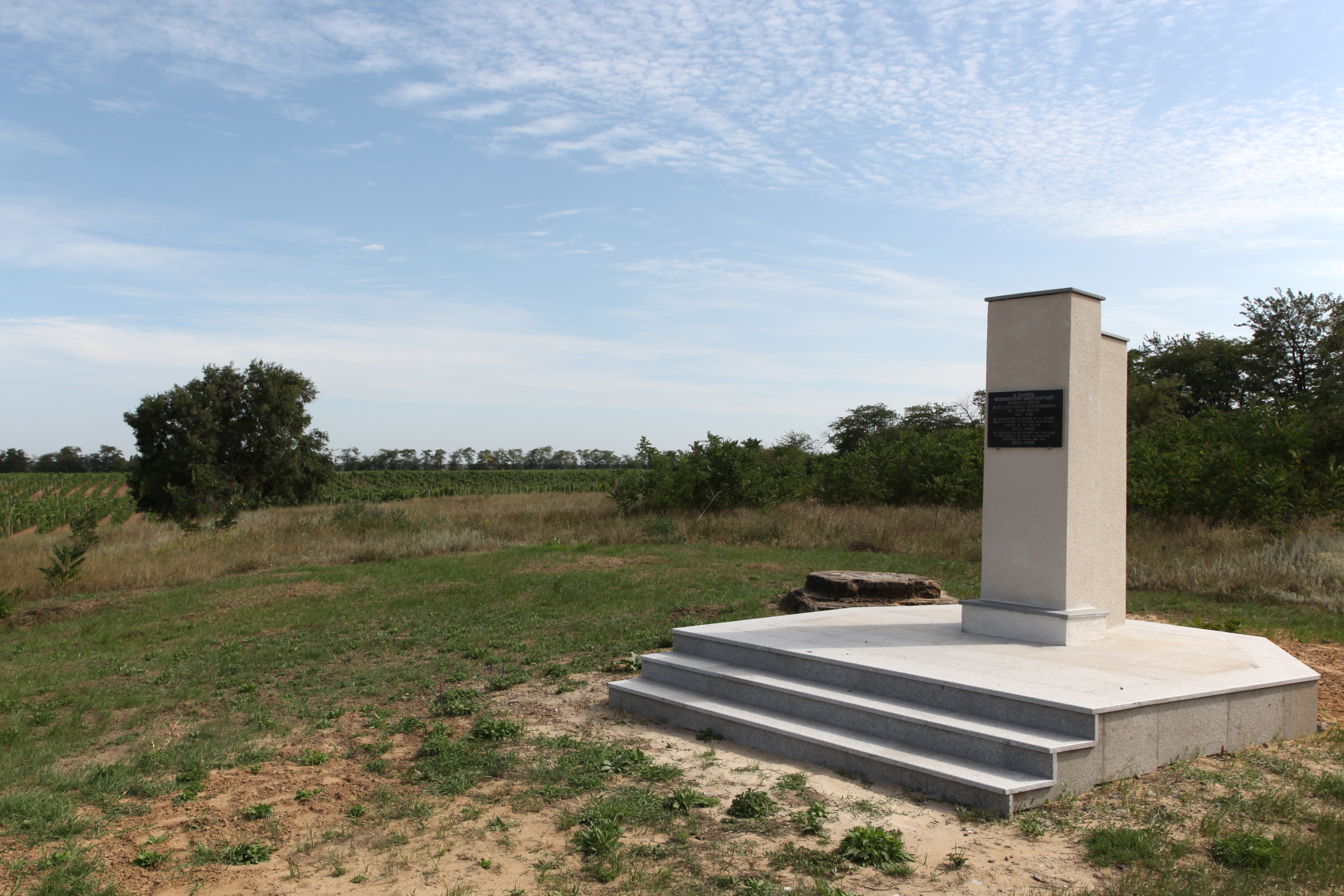
Swiss Graveyard

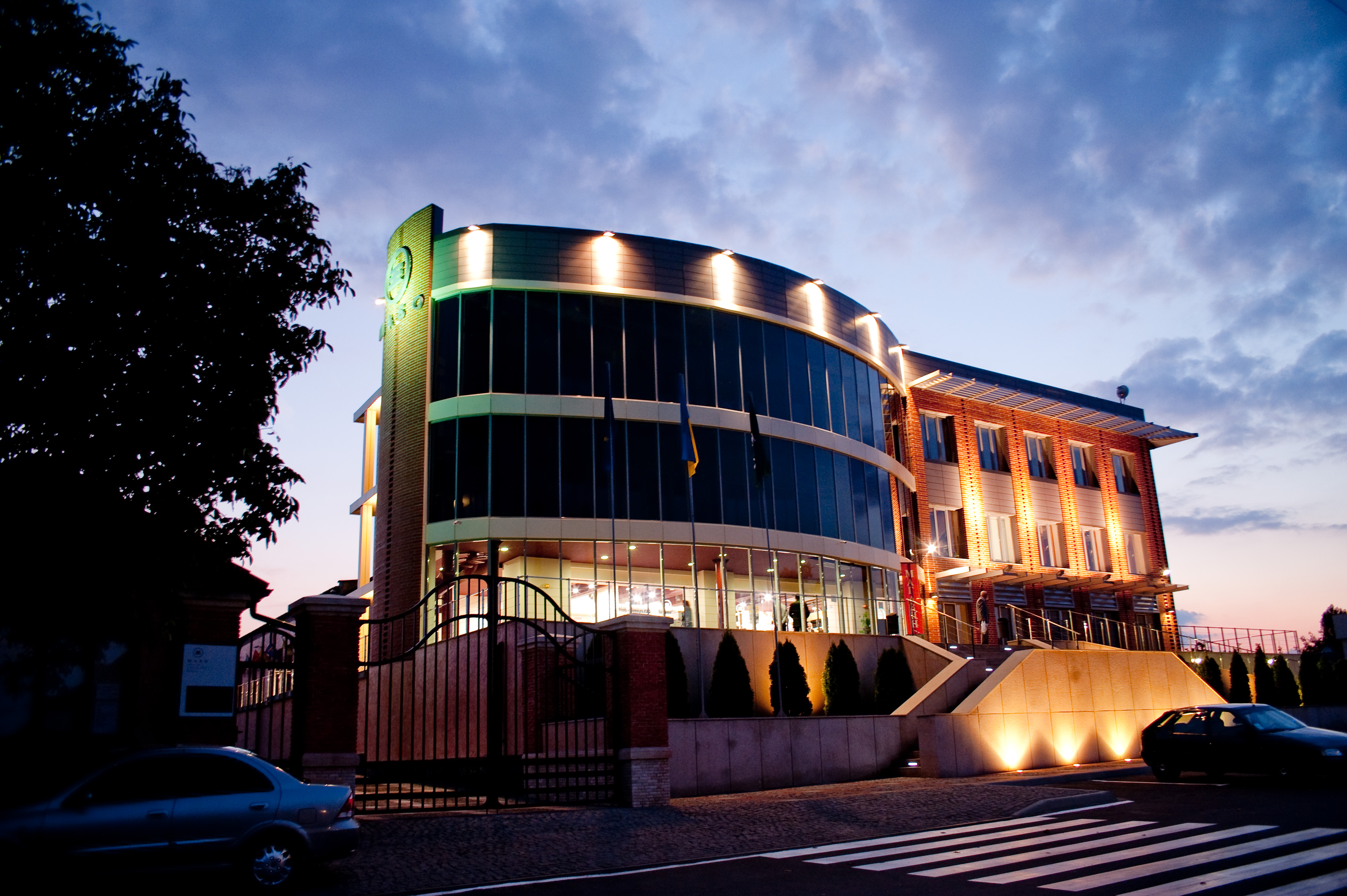
Shabo Winery

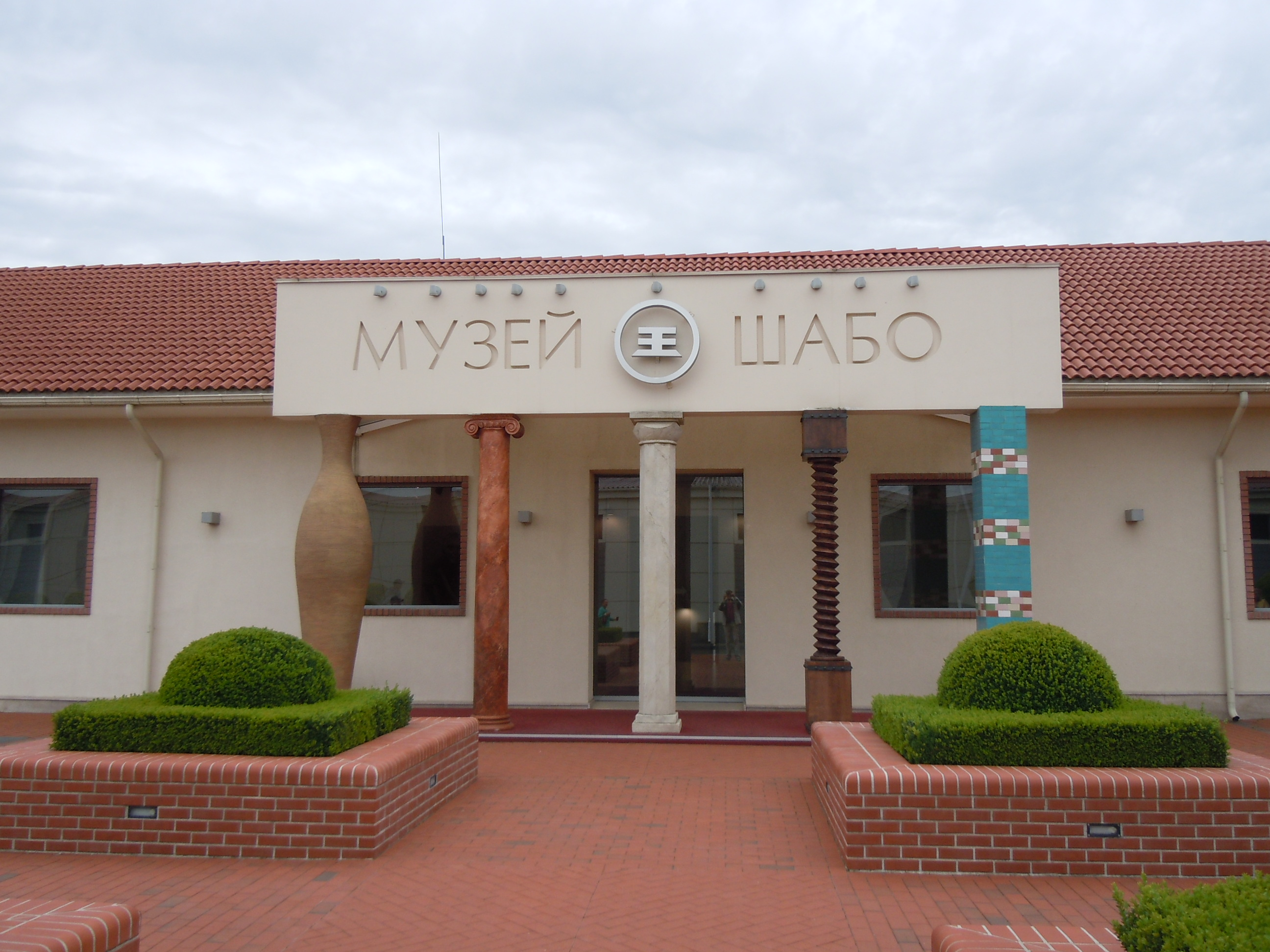
Shabo Museum

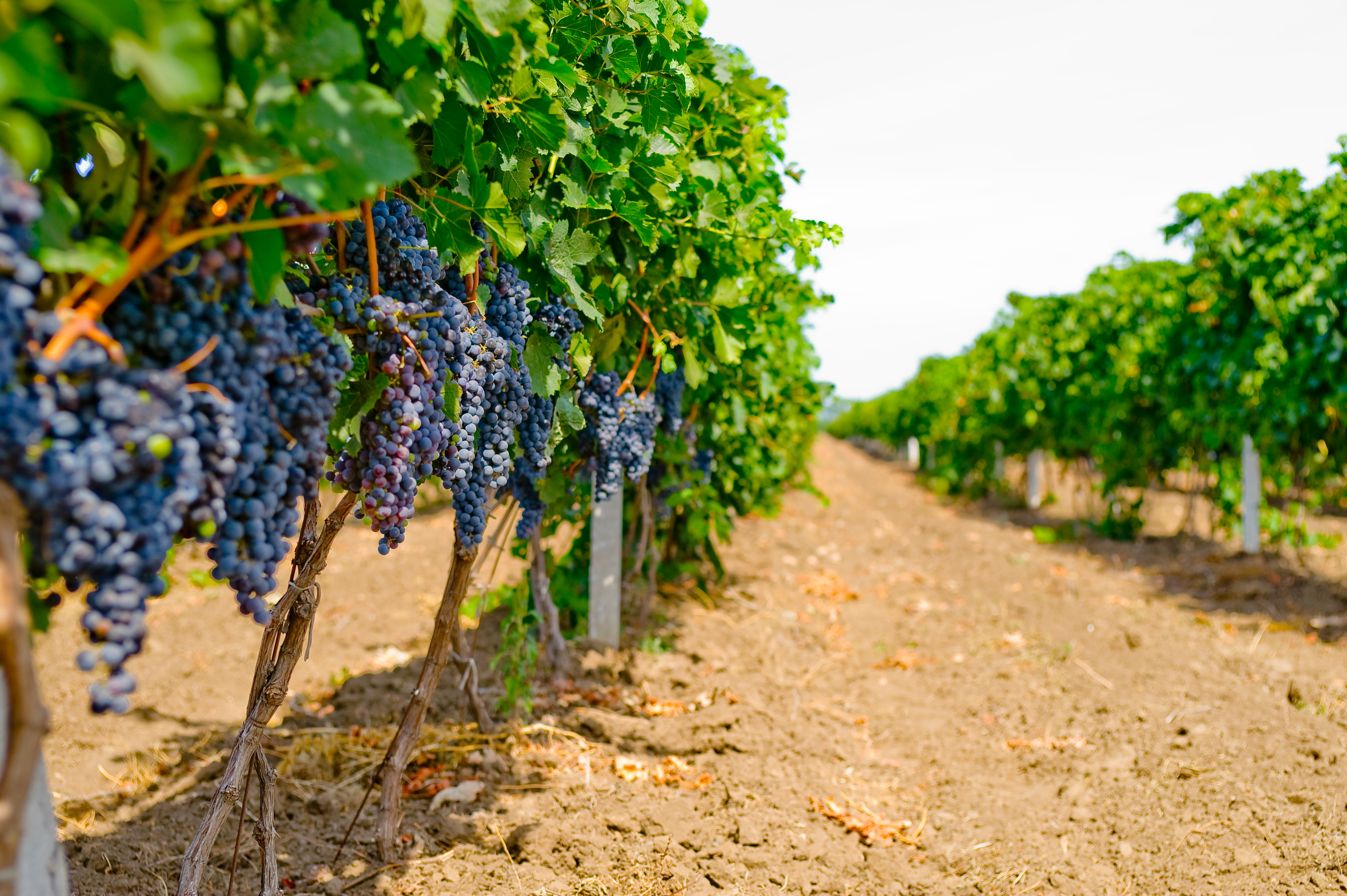
Merlot grape vines

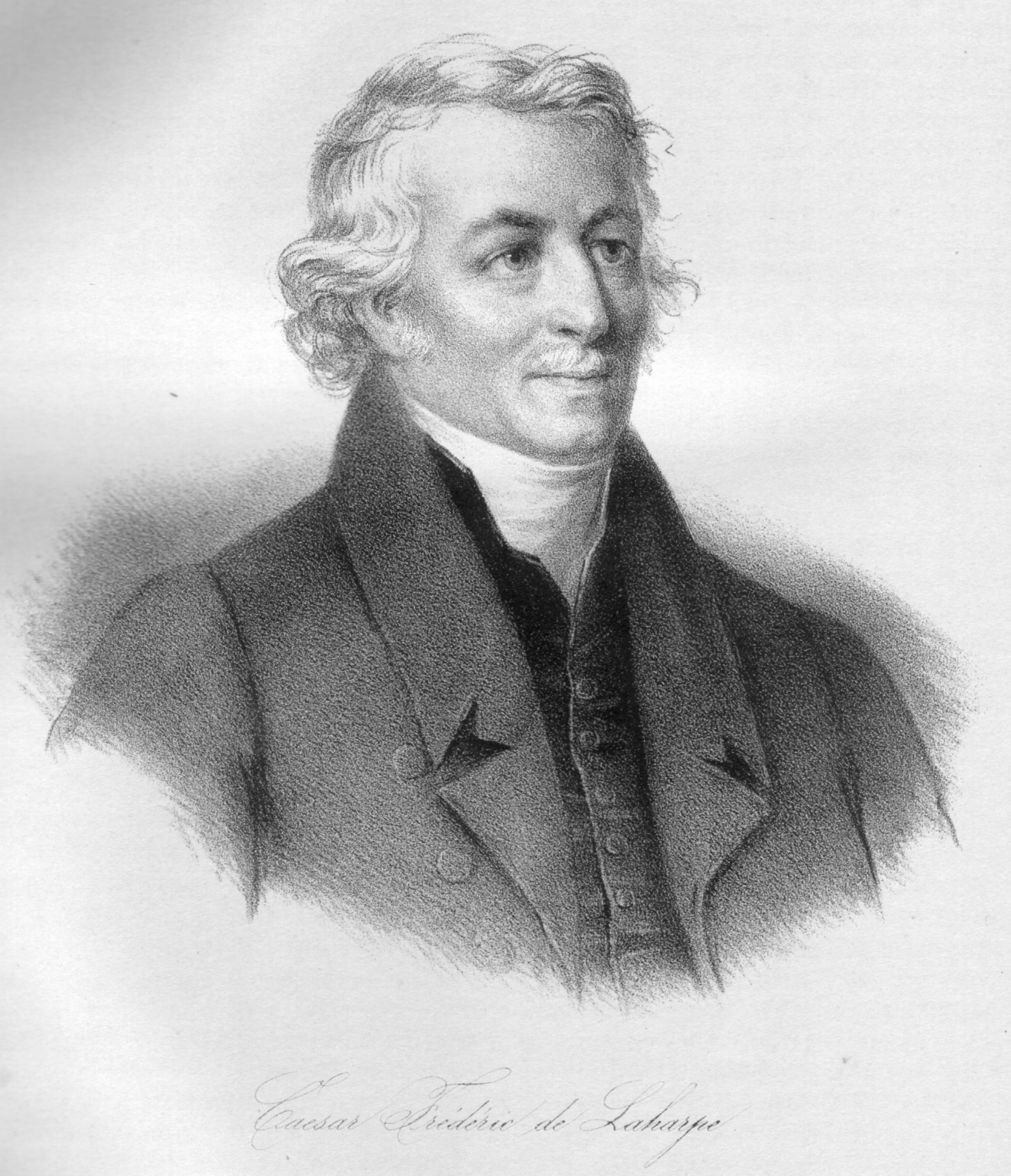
Frédéric-César de la Harpe, Swiss teacher of Alexander I.

== See also ==
- Ukrainian wine
- Wine production in Odesa Oblast
