= Artsyz urban hromada =

Coordinates: 45°59′N 29°25′E

Artsyz urban hromada Арцизька міська громада
- Hromada
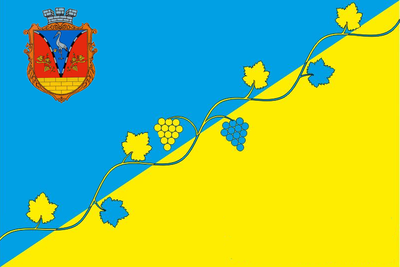
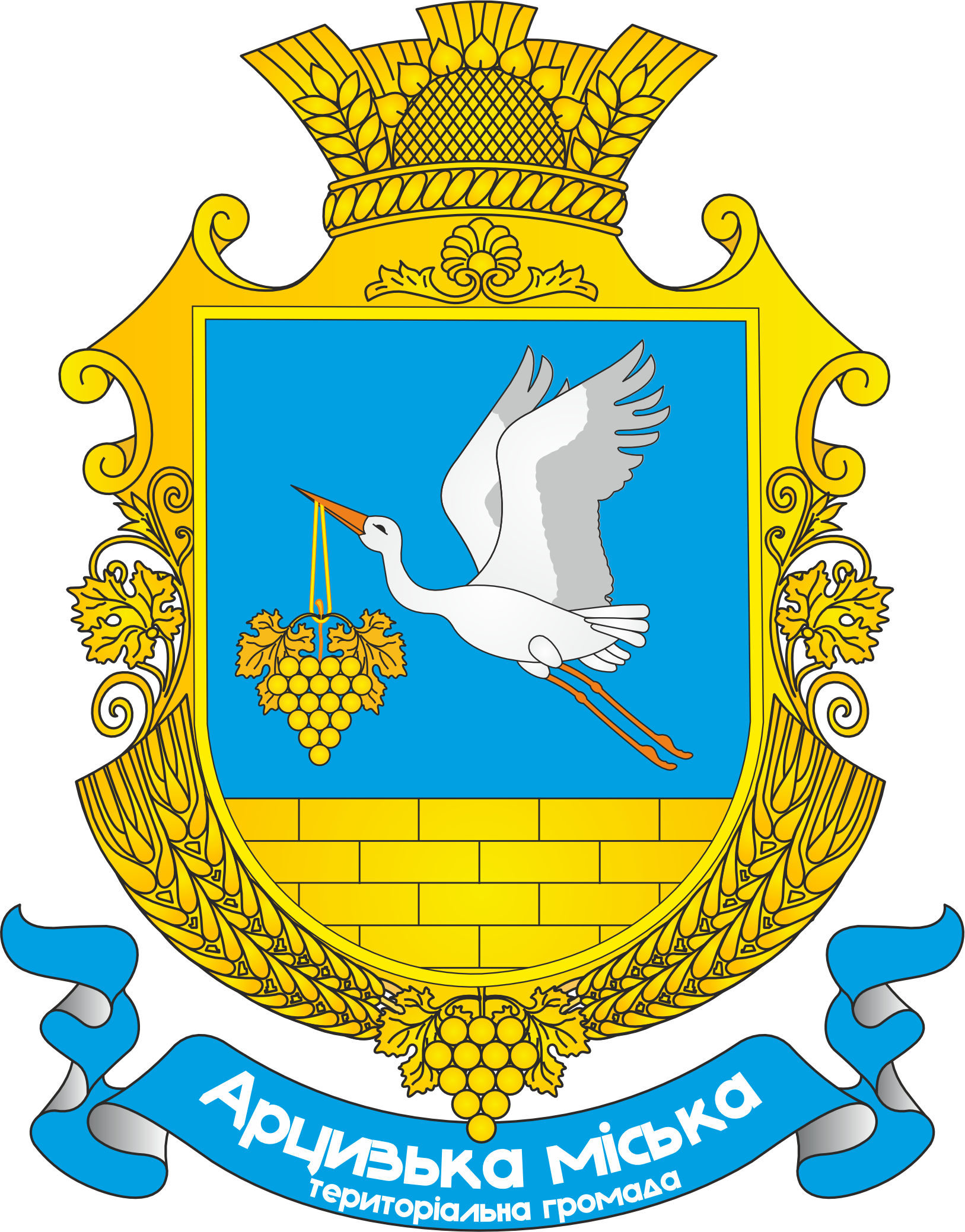
- Flag Coat of arms
- Interactive map of Artsyz urban hromada
- Country: Ukraine
- Oblast: Odesa Oblast
- Raion: Bolhrad Raion
- Admin. center: Artsyz

Area
  - Total: 760.7 km^{2} (293.7 sq mi)

Population (2020)
  - Total: 35,734
  - Density: 46.98/km^{2} (121.7/sq mi)
- CATOTTG code: UA51060010000033212
- Settlements: 13
- Cities: 1
- Rural settlements: 1
- Villages: 11

Artsyz urban hromada is a hromada in Bolhrad Raion of Odesa Oblast in southwestern Ukraine. Population: 35,734 (2020 est.)

The hromada consists of a city of Artsyz, one rural settlement (Novokholmske) and 11 villages:

- Vynohradivka
- Hlavani
- Delen
- Zadunaivka
- Kamianske
- Nadezhdivka
- Nova Ivanivka
- Novoselivka
- Plotsk
- Priamobalka
- Kholmske

== Links ==
- Арцизька міська громада // Облікова картка на офіційному вебсайті Верховної Ради України.
- https://decentralization.gov.ua/newgromada/4311
- https://gromada.info/gromada/arcyzka/
