= Pryberezhne, Sudak Municipality, Crimea =

Pryberezhne Прибережне
- Village
- Interactive map of Pryberezhne
- Location of Pryberezhne in Crimea
- Coordinates: 44°51′35″N 35°08′00″E
- Republic: Crimea
- Municipality: Sudak Municipality
- Elevation: 7 m (23 ft)

Population (2014)
  - Total: 43
- Time zone: UTC+4 (MSK)
- Postal code: 98033
- Area code: +380 6566
- Website: http://rada.gov.ua/

Pryberezhne or Pribryezhnoye (Ukrainian: Прибережне; Russian: Прибрежное; Crimean Tatar: Pribrejnoye) is a village in the Sudak Municipality of the Crimea, a territory recognized by a majority of countries as part of Ukraine and annexed by Russia as the Republic of Crimea.

Pryberezhne is located on Crimea's southern shore on the Black Sea at an elevation of 7 m (23 ft). Its population was 3 in the 2001 Ukrainian census. Current population: 43 (2014 Census).
