= Pryberezhne, Odesa Oblast =

Rural settlements in Odesa Oblast, Ukraine

Pryberezhne Прибережне
- Rural settlement
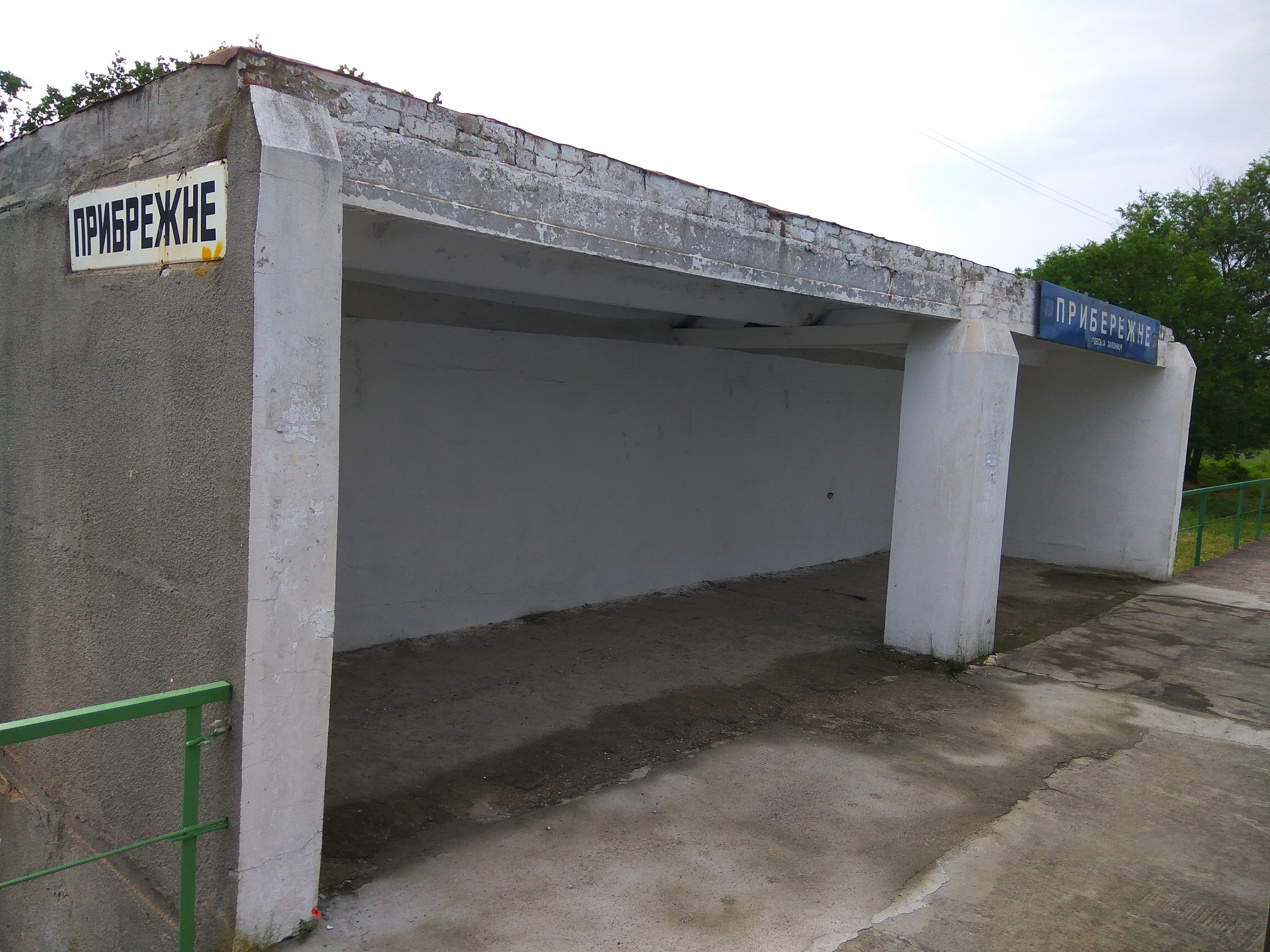

- Location within Odesa Oblast Location within Ukraine
- Coordinates: 46°04′50″N 30°24′40″E
- Country: Ukraine
- Oblast: Odesa Oblast
- Raion: Bilhorod-Dnistrovskyi Raion
- Hromada: Shabo rural hromada
- Elevation: 15 m (49 ft)

Population (2001)
  - Total: 255
- Time zone: UTC+2 (EET (Kyiv))
  - Summer (DST): UTC+3 (EEST)

Pryberezhne (Ukrainian: Прибережне) is a rural settlement in Bilhorod-Dnistrovskyi Raion in the Odesa Oblast of Ukraine. It belongs to Shabo rural hromada, one of the hromadas of Ukraine.

== Demographics ==
According to the 1989 Soviet census, the population of the village was 162 people, of whom 70 were men and 92 women.

According to the 2001 Ukrainian census, 255 people lived in the village.

=== Languages ===
According to the 2001 census, the primary languages of the inhabitants of the village were:

| Language | Percentage |
|---|---|
| Ukrainian | 72.16 % |
| Russian | 25.1 % |
| Bulgarian | 1.18 % |
| Belarusian | 0.39 % |
| Armenian | 0.39 % |
| Moldovan (Romanian) | 0.39 % |
