= Pryberezhne, Saky Raion, Crimea =

Pryberezhne
- Village
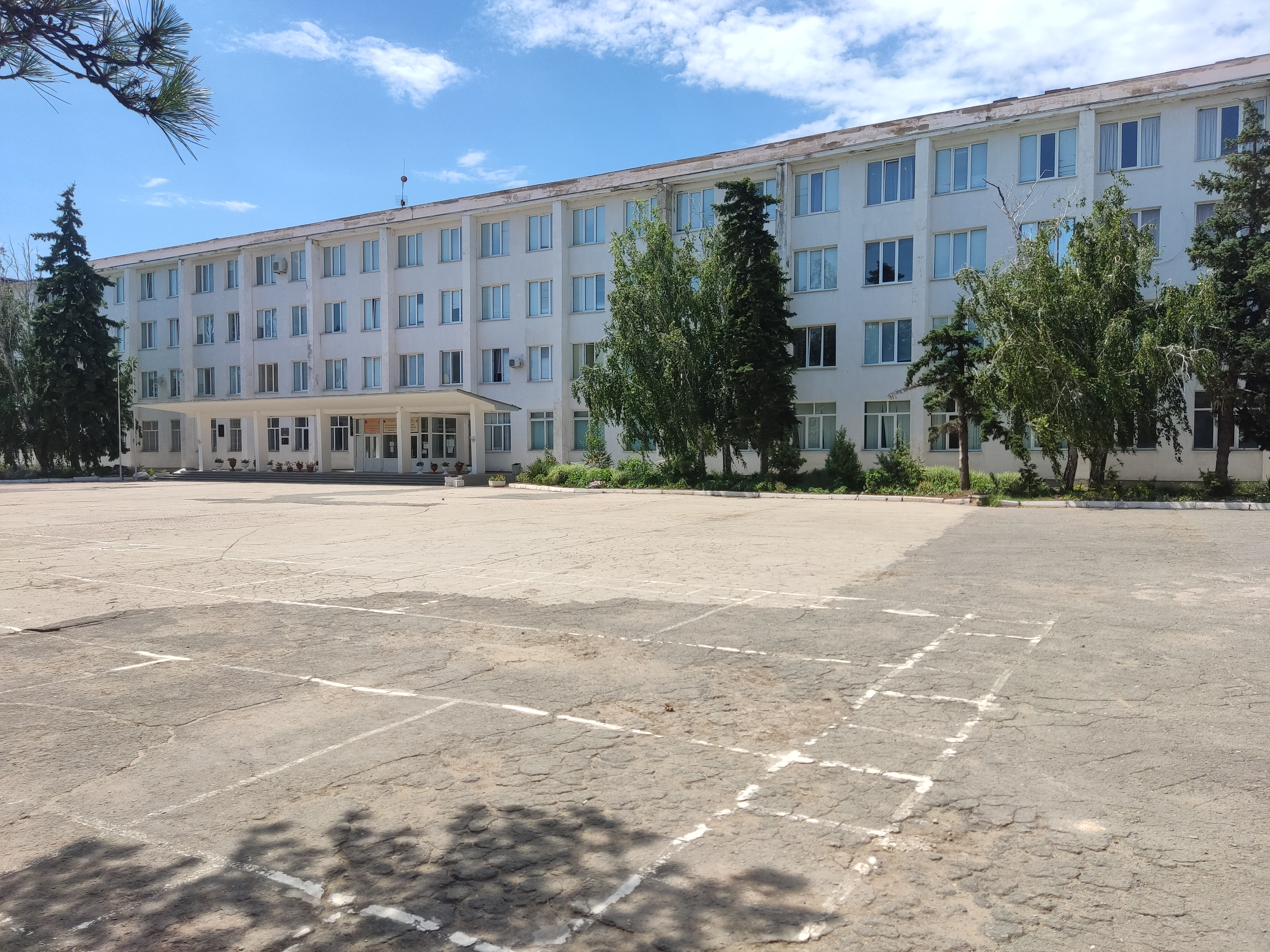

- Location within Ukraine Location within Crimea
- Coordinates: 45°08′45″N 33°31′20″E
- Country: Ukraine
- Region: AR Crimea
- Municipality: Saky
- Elevation: 8 m (26 ft)

Population
  - Total: 671
- Time zone: UTC+4 (MSK)

Pryberezhne (Ukrainian: Прибережне; Crimean Tatar: Qara Töbe; Russian: Прибрежное) is a village located in Saky Raion, Crimea. Population: 671 (2014 Census).

== See also ==
- Saky Raion
