= Delen =

Delen is a surname. Notable people with the surname include:

- Dirck van Delen (1605–1671), Dutch painter
- Jef Delen (born 1976), Belgian footballer
