= Vladimir Tsyganko =

Bessarabian and Soviet politician (1887–1938)

Vladimir Vladimirovich Tsyganko (Russian: Владимир Владимирович Цыганко; Romanian: Vladimir Vladimirovici Țîganco; also Țâganco, Tziganco, Tziganko or Țiganco; 1886/1887 – January 26, 1938) was a Bessarabian, and later Soviet, politician. The son of a distinguished architect, and himself an engineer by vocation, Tsyganko entered politics shortly before the proclamation of a Moldavian Democratic Republic, when he earned a seat in the republican legislature (Sfatul Țării). He sided with the parliamentary Peasants' Faction, which supported left-wing ideals and pushed for land reform, being generally, and radically, opposed to the more right-wing Moldavian Bloc. Tsyganko was skeptical of the Bloc's plan to unite Bessarabia with Romania, although he possibly supported a federation. His uncompromising stance divided his Faction and led the Romanian Kingdom's authorities to identify him as a major obstruction to the unionist cause.

In November 1918, as the Bloc switched its support to unconditional unification and dissolved the regional government bodies, Tsyganko rejected the new regime and moved to Odessa. Allying himself to members of the White movement, with whom he set up a Committee for the Salvation of Bessarabia, attending the Paris Peace Conference to campaign for the reversal of the union. He later settled in Soviet territory, where he helped create a Moldavian Autonomous Soviet Socialist Republic. Other members of his family opted to stay behind in Greater Romania—where his brother Nikolai was marginally active in the Bessarabian regionalist caucus. Vladimir eventually left politics and returned to his first profession, holding a technical position at Magnitogorsk Iron and Steel Works. He was persecuted during the imposition of Stalinism and, in 1937, fell victim to the Great Purge.

== Biography ==
=== Early career ===
Tsyganko's paternal grandfather was a Don Cossack, Afanasy or Afanasie, who had reportedly deserted his post and made his way to the western reaches of the Russian Empire, in Bessarabian Governorate. Vladimir was born in Kishinev (Chișinău), regional capital of Bessarabia, and was a graduate of Riga Polytechnicum. He returned to his native city where his father Vladimir Sr (? – 1919), an architect, designed such landmarks as the Ethnography Museum and Saint Nicholas Church; his brother Nikolai (Nicolai) Vladimirovich (born 1882) was the zemstvo engineer in Orhei, and from 1909 in Kishinev itself. By 1904, their father was the Director of Monastery Estates in Bessarabia, in which capacity he testified against Russian police after the Kishinev pogrom, accusing them of passivity.

In 1916, the Bessarabian journalist Alexis Nour described Tsyganko Sr. as a "much esteemed [...] Bessarabian intellectual of a Moldavian nationalist hue, but not a separatist [in respect to Russia]" (see Moldovenism). Also according to Nour, Nikolai, whom he met personally, could speak only Russian. Romanian politician Duiliu Zamfirescu, who met and debated with Vladimir Vladimirovich in 1918, claimed that the Tsygankos were "Ruthenian". He and his adversary talked in French, as Tsyganko "could not speak a word of Romanian". The same year, Tsyganko's political adversaries suggested that he was in fact of Bulgarian heritage, though mixed with "some other nation". Some ten years later, geographer Eugeniu Giurgea referred to Tsyganko Jr as Ukrainian.

According to notes left by Gherman Pântea, Tsyganko spent much of his youth in the United States, working as an engineer. He had returned to Bessarabia by the time World War I, and reached political prominence after the October Revolution, which had left the region to administer itself independently, as a "Moldavian Democratic Republic". According to recollections published in 1937 by Elena Alistar, Tsyganko was directly involved in the soldiers' congress and the November 1917 elections, which formed a regional assembly, or Sfatul Țării. Alistar and Tsyganko both took seats during that race—the former as a Romanian nationalist, the latter as an affiliate of the Peasants' Faction, which was strictly about social and economic reform. According to Alistar, Tsyganko was a "smart boy", but his anti-Romanian sentiment was strong, second only to that espoused by another female deputy, Nadejda Grinfeld.

In January 1918, the local Soviet of Workers' and Soldiers' Deputies began to override Sfatul Țării and attempted to bring about Bolshevik rule. This move was swiftly suppressed by a punitive expedition of the Romanian Army. The 3rd Peasants' Congress, assembled few days after the occupation of Chișinău, adopted an anti-secessionist position, dismissed the Moldavian prime-minister Pantelimon Erhan from the position of President of the Peasants' Soviet, and elected a new leadership from among the most vocal opponents of the Romanian intervention. According to the Rumcherod's newspaper, during the opening session, Tsyganko's message on behalf of the local Socialist Revolutionary branch was met with applause and calls to support the Russian Revolution. The following day, after demanding the withdrawal of Romanian troops within 24 hours, and negotiating on the issue with the Romanian military, the Congress' Presidium was put under arrest. General Ernest Broșteanu dismissed the immunity of those Peasants' representatives who were also members of Sfatul, and issued a strong warning against further anti-Romanian agitation. Consequently, the following days the Congress selected a new list of Sfatul representatives, headed by Tsyganko, which comprised mostly moderates.

=== Clashes with the unionists ===
Tsyganko, who was counted among the representatives of the Russian minority, remained with the left-wing Peasants' Faction, which stood in opposition to the Moldavian Bloc of Romanian nationalists. Constantin Stere, who helped with organizing the latter group after returning from his Romanian exile, was proposing a platform of both unionism and land reform. Alistar reports that Tsyganko had not opposed this compromise, telling his Faction colleagues that they should "each vote as you please." This in turn empowered Romanian peasant deputies such as Nicolae Mămăligă to openly support unification with Romania. Stere himself still viewed Tsyganko as a leading obstacle in reconciling the agrarian and nationalist agendas: "As for the Moldavian peasants, those whom I found united as a bloc under Țiganco, those who had seized the great estates with a revolution, they displayed strong feelings of fear and suspicion. They cast their leery sights across the Prut [into Romania], which they believed was a feudal country, where peasants had no rights, not even voting rights, and no land of their own".

During the debates on land reform, Tsyganko suggested postponing the discussion until a new government, "representative of the people's will", would be approved by a Moldavian Constituent Assembly. Presumably, he feared that pressure from the Romanian troops would affect the extent of the reform. Nevertheless, he became the first chairman of Sfatul's Agrarian Commission, and in parallel presided upon the Peasants' Soviet. According to Giurgea, during his tenure at the Commission, he "always sided with the Russians, blatantly so." Despite being involved in left-wing politics, Tsyganko would gradually develop a working relationship with A. N. Krupensky, the Polono-Bessarabian landowner and ex-Marshal of Nobility, and Alexandr K. Schmidt, who stood for the conservative side of anti-Romanian agitation; between 1918 and 1920 the three men issued calls for the end of Romanian occupation, and began popularizing their cause in Europe.

When Romanian Premier Alexandru Marghiloman made his way into Bessarabia to canvass for the unionist cause, he found the Peasant Faction divided between followers of Ion Inculeț, who endorsed the Romanian viewpoint, and deputies who sided with Tsyganko. Zamfirescu, who traveled with Marghiloman, recalls that Tsyganko "thrice in one month" attempted to recall the Republic's Directorate, his moves resisted by Inculeț. He also protested the selection of pro-Romanian students from Kiev and Odessa as representatives of the Transnistrian Moldavians, in which he saw efforts to shake the balance of power inside the Sfatul. Zamfirescu claims to have saved Tsyganko from an undisclosed mortal danger, and then to have conversed with him, trying to gain insight into his political motivations. The latter, he concluded, were "most phantasmagorical socialist ideas", not dissuaded by the prospect of "death, suffering, military disaster, sheer destitution, or degeneracy". He adds: "It was late at night, I was experiencing chills, and so I believe I have insulted the convictions of this visionary youth, reassuring him that all opinions lead to a ministerial chair, provided one makes sure to discard them on cue."

Despite proclaiming its independence in late February 1918, the Moldavian Republic was still seen in various circles as subordinate to the neighboring Ukrainian People's Republic. Its Central Rada wished to represent Bessarabia in the preliminary negotiation of the Bucharest peace treaty, imposed by the Central Powers on Romania. Sfatul reacted by reaffirming its independence and rejecting the division of Bessarabia—against the Akkerman and Khotin zemstva, which had proclaimed their accession to Ukraine. A Moldavian delegation was therefore selected to head to Kiev and obtain from the Central Rada official recognition of Moldavia's independence. The delegation, which included the interior minister Vladimir Cristi, nationalists Nicolae Secară and Teodor Neaga, and Tsyganko as representative of the Peasants' Faction, was prevented from leaving. According to the unionist Gheorghe Andronachi, it was Daniel Ciugureanu, the Republic's pro-Romanian prime minister, who intervened with the Romanian Army to hamper the departure, fearing that an international recognition of independence would hinder nationalist plans for union with Romania.

=== March union vote ===
On March 27, 1918, when Sfatul voted to support the union with Romania, Tsyganko effectively abstained. In April, the pro-Romanian newspaper Cuvânt Moldovenesc attacked Tsyganko for his obstructionism and his perceived lack of political legitimacy, claiming that his Peasant Faction was a personal party, the "Tsygankists". Zamfirescu found it "unbelievable" that Romanian-speaking peasants had ever endorsed Tsyganko, who, he claimed, "systematically opposes Bessarabia's government and Romania's policies, endeavoring for its annexation to the Ukraine"; however, he also notes that Tsyganko himself accused the Romanians of wanting to hand over Bessarabia to the Ukrainians. Historian Theodor Codreanu believes that Tsyganko actually supported the latter option, and therefore that he "saluted the presence of Romanian troops" as long as they seemed to fulfill that requirement.

A radical project for land reform had received pledges of support from Sfatul secretary Ion Buzdugan, and also from Marghiloman himself; consequently, according to historian Alberto Basciani, Tsyganko's critique of unionism became marginal within his own party and Soviet. On behalf of the Peasant Faction, Tsyganko denied the Assembly even had the authority to discuss such an issue, declaring his group would refrain from voting on the union, since they considered this a matter for a Constitutional Convention; furthermore, he stated the only admissible terms for a union between the Moldavian and Romanian peoples would be in a federation. Five members of his faction decided to side with the nationalists and voted for the union, while the other 17 present abstained. According to Cuvânt Moldovenesc, this was an ethnic split, with the five being "Moldavian" or Romanian natives rather than Slavs; according to this report, only one or two of those abstaining were "Moldavian". The newspaper dismissed Tsyganko's claim that Sfatul had no say in the matter of union, claiming that what really upset the deputy was "seeing these good Moldavians, who voted for unification with Romania, emerging from this as the true lords and masters of this land that has up to now been dragged down by Tsygankolings". This account was backed in 1921 by Stere, who took personal credit for having "plucked the Moldavian peasants out of Țiganco's peasant bloc".

More modern researchers are divided in their assessments of Tsyganko's political stance at that early stage. Basciani describes him as one of those who "opposed with great vehemence the union of Bessarabia with Romania". However, according to Svetlana Suveică, Tsyganko did not object to union with autonomy, and in fact saw it as "the only solution for avoiding the Bolshevik invasion of the region." In November, after the generalization of Romanian military rule in Bessarabia, Tsyganko, as putative "president" of the Bessarabian Peasants' Party, with Nicolae Alexandri, Ion Păscăluță, and 37 other Sfatul members, sent a letter of protest to the Romanian government of Constantin Coandă. This coalition of Romanian Bessarabians and White Russians demanded the immediate recognition and restoration of autonomy, as well as the lifting of the martial law; however, its imperatives were rejected as illegitimate by the central authorities. According to Clark: "We cannot but applaud the admirable aims of the 40 Deputies, in most of their requests; but at the same time we must wonder at their ingenuousness; they did not foresee the constant turbulence on the Eastern frontier, which even at that time impressed the Roumanians".

=== November union vote ===
The protest arose controversy in political circles: Tsyganko himself reported a private interview with the Romanian envoy Artur Văitoianu. He quoted the latter as offering a deal: "You must renounce [autonomy] if only for this sole reason—that you no good Roumanian officials in Bessarabia—that is to say, none who are good nationalists. If you give up autonomy, you will not have a Commissioner-General, but you will have a Bessarabian Chargé d'Affaires, a man of your own character, who will be nominated by the Central Power. The new [Bessarabian] Directorate will remain in office until the meeting of the Pan-Roumanian Constitutional Assembly. Does this appeal to you as attractive?" Also according to Tsyganko, Văitoianu informed the group that they needed to coalesce with Romanian nationalists in front of Great Russian revivalism, and that "the national idea takes precedence over everything", implicitly threatening Sfatul dignitaries.

As Suveică writes, it was only at this stage that Tsyganko became an adversary of the unionist camp, placing his hopes in a reestablishment of the Russian Republic, and her re-annexation of Bessarabia. At the last Sfatul session, on November 25, 1918, unconditional union was proposed for ratification, as one of several measures being voted on, alongside the allocation of offices and a land-reform-law. According to the Peasants' Faction account, also supported by many of the Moldavian nationalists who had signed the earlier protest, the Moldavian Bloc kept the opposition uniformed about there being a Sfatul session: "only Mr. V. Tziganko was aware of the fact, and he was informed privately, two hours before the opening of the sitting." The Tsyganko group confronted the assembly's president, Pan Halippa (a Romanian who was also their party colleague), arguing that his election was illegal. They announced another walk-out, to which voices of the Moldavian Bloc responded with rhetorical questions ("Is this how you intend to solve the agrarian issue?") and taunts of "Good riddance!"

The opposition maintained that the walk-out resulted in a lack of quorum: only 48 of 160 deputies were reportedly present, which made the voting results questionable. Tsyganko and his colleagues accused the Bloc of putting up unconditional union for the vote as a rider, at 2.30 AM on the morning of November 26, and of counting votes during considerable and purposeful commotion. Some of the Fraction deputies in the opposition, including Tsyganko and Gavril Buciușcan, actually returned in time to cast their Nay votes. Clark claims that one of the Moldavian Bloc representatives testified that there were enough deputies present. According to Halippa, Tsyganko's walk-out from the Assembly Hall proved to be a miscalculation, as the Peasant Faction's other members returned to vote on land reform, and, subsequently, on the unconditional union. Marghiloman nevertheless gave a contrasting account. He complained that "not even 30 deputies" had been present for the vote abrogating the conditions, in spite of "all the money spent".

=== Salvation Committee ===
In early 1919, Tsyganko emigrated from what was then being recognized as Romanian territory. He settled in Odessa, a Ukrainian port city, where he established the Peasants' Faction in exile, alongside a dozen other former Sfatul deputies. He joined efforts with Krupensky and Schmidt, affiliating with their Committee for the Salvation of Bessarabia, whose activities were closely monitored by Romania's secret police, the Siguranța. According to the Moldavian Bloc's Petru Cazacu, they answered indirectly to Anton Denikin, commander of the Volunteer Army. The various groups of Bessarabian autonomists and White loyalists agreed to send a common delegation to the Peace Conference in Paris, where the Allies were debating on recognizing the union. On February 10, the Committee issued a common platform for these organizations, sharing two goals: "the liberation of Bessarabia from the Romanian annexation and the realization of the aspirations of the people of Bessarabia." The latter referred to the region's reintegration into Russia. In April, together with Krupensky and Schmidt, later followed by Mark Slonim and Mihail Savenco, Tsyganko had arrived in Paris. In its addresses to the international media, the group insisted that the union was a putsch by urban intellectuals against the other social classes. It also circulated a protest against the Romanian land reform project, which the Salvation Committee saw as a chauvinistic attack against the landed gentry and the Russian patriots.

As noted by Suveică, Tsyganko was the only delegation member to belong to a non-aristocratic elite, and nominally an appointee of the "Central Committee of the Peasants of Bessarabia". He therefore took some distance from the conservative demands of the Salvation Committee, and in various contexts presented himself as an independent emissary, united with the others mainly in their common support for a plebiscite clause in Bessarabia. However, his autonomism and Krupensky's loyalism were mostly endorsed by the White émigré lobby in Paris, including the likes of Georgy Lvov, Vasily Maklakov, Sergey Sazonov, and Nikolai Tchaikovsky. In his papers, Halippa commented that Tsyganko, the self-proclaimed "socialist and revolutionary", had arrived in Paris as a propagandist of Russian nationalism, "with no connection to the people [of Bessarabia]". Cazacu also notes that the "bizarre association" comprising Tsyganko, Maklakov and Schmidt propagated the contradictory claim that Sfatul was a "Bolshevik" assembly.

In June 1919, the French communist organ, L'Humanité, gave exposure to Slonim and Tsyganko's allegations regarding political repression and "atrocities" in Bessarabia, as a common protest of the "democrats and socialists". Such allegations were responded to by the Peasant Party's Ion Pelivan, who wrote the newspaper to argue that Romania's intervention had first of all restored "liberty and democracy" in Bessarabia, and that the union expressed "the free will of the Bessarabian populace, with no outside intervention." Marghiloman was also critical of "the separatist" Tsyganko, dismissing the accusations. Although he acknowledged some abuse of powers by Romanian administrators, including the "destruction of villages", he argued that it was "nothing compared" to what was being done by the French Army, also present in the region (see Southern Front of the Russian Civil War). Countering Tsyganko's claim to speak for the peasants, the pro-Romanian delegation grew to include peasant members such as Ion Codreanu, Gheorghe Năstase, and Sergiu Victor Cujbă.

=== Later life ===
Making his split from the White Russian community a definitive one, Tsyganko remained for a while in Paris. He made efforts to settle in Switzerland, but was reportedly expelled as an "undesirable". He eventually emigrated into the Ukrainian Soviet Socialist Republic. In September 1921, he wrote a memorandum on Bessarabia and Romania–Russia relations, which he sent to Leon Trotsky, the Commissar for Military Affairs. His text informed the Russian viewpoint at the negotiations in Warsaw between the Soviets and the Romanians, but also presented personal observations on the social makeup of Bessarabia. Tsyganko argued that the Moldavian Republic's creation and union were attributable to left-wing "agitators" such as Inculeț and Pantelimon Erhan. He claimed that multi-ethnic Bessarabia was naturally "internationalist", but also rural and "well-off", concluding that an anti-Romanian revolt could happen if sustained from across the border. Cazacu noted in 1924 that the dossier compiled by the Bolsheviks and the earlier Salvation Committee drafts used as sources the same documents, including statements by private individuals. Nikolai Vladimirovich, meanwhile, remained behind in Romania, working as a conservator for the Historical Monuments Commission, then as Department head for Chișinău City Hall. He rallied with the Bessarabian Democratic League, a minor party formed around Alexandri, Zamfir Arbore and Vasile Ghenzul, afterwards presenting himself as a candidate in the legislative elections of March 1922.

Vladimir Tsyganko was touring the major Soviet cities during March 1924, appearing alongside Samuil Bantke, V. Broască, and other "Bessarabian native refugees". Late that month, answering an invitation made by diplomat Nikolay Krestinsky, Tsyganko appeared at the Romanian–Soviet diplomatic conference in Vienna, officially tasked with transmitting "to world opinion the true desires of the Bessarabian masses." He was joined there by Schmidt, Broască and Nicolae Ferendino, as the "delegation of Bessarabian refugees in the Soviet Union". Tsyganko read out the delegation's Russian-language memorandum, which underscored his loyalty toward the Soviet Union. The Romanian newspaper Opinia noted in April 1924 that the "known renegade Tziganco, who had followed the Soviet delegation to the conference in Vienna" was present at Odessa with the "so-called Bessarabian refugees", and was issuing renewed calls for a territorial plebiscite. The same month, Romania's government clamped down on the newly formed Romanian Communist Party (PCdR), arresting, among others, activists Marcel and Ana Pauker. According to the government paper Viitorul, the authorities alleged that the Paukers were directly assisting Tsyganko with engineering "a revolution in Bessarabia", which was to overlap with the Vienna affair. Viitorul described Tsyganko as the leader of the propaganda committee in Odessa, which had pushed the PCdR into endorsing a Bessarabian plebiscite.

In June 1924, Universul daily described Tsyganko as linked to the Krestintern, claiming that his agenda was "the Bolshevization of Romanian peasantry start[ing] from Bessarabia." The same source noted that he was assisted in this by a Stanko Trifanoff, formerly a member of the Bulgarian Agrarian National Union. Later that year, Tsyganko became a founding figure of the Moldavian Autonomous Soviet Socialist Republic (MASSR), created on Soviet territory as a Bessarabian rump state; a notice published by the Romanian newspaper Cuvântul Poporului in November wrongly credited him as MASSR "president", and further claimed that Mikhail Frunze was organizing the Red Army in that part of Soviet Ukraine. In September 1926, Tsyganko was again at Odessa, where, together with Ivan Krivorukov, he issued a formal protest against Italy's recognition of the Bessarabian union with Romania, and therefore against her "passage into the anti-Soviet camp".

In early 1929, Nikolai supported the Bessarabian regionalist platform for administrative reform (an initiative spearheaded by Erhan and Alexandru Mîță). He died some five years later, at age 52, while reading a book. On the 10th anniversary of the union in 1928, Vladimir was still being called upon by the Soviets to champion Bessarabian separatism. His and Alexandri's views were publicized in a special edition of Pravda of Moscow, alongside articles by exiled figures of the PCdR—Alexandru Dobrogeanu-Gherea—and by the Red-Army veteran Ion Dic Dicescu. Moving to Leningrad, he also fell back on his professional career. He served as deputy technical director of the State Institute for the Design of Metallurgical Plants, and was then head of the technical control department of the Magnitogorsk Iron and Steel Works. Nevertheless, in 1937 he was singled out as a political suspect by the Stalinist regime, at the height of the Great Purge. Arrested on November 29, he was sentenced to death on December 2 and executed shortly after, in January 1938. He continued to be appreciated in Soviet historiography during later decades: in 1984, Iacov Copanschi suggested that he had correctly represented the Bessarabian interests at Vienna.
