= Mark Slonim =

Russian politician, scholar, and writer

- Born: Mark Lvovich Slonim; March 23, 1894; Odessa, Russian Empire
- Died: 1976 (aged 81–82); Beaulieu-sur-Mer, Alpes-Maritimes, France
- Other names: Marc Slonim, Marco Slonim

Academic background
- Influences: Nikolay Chernyshevsky, Alexander Herzen, Eugène-Melchior de Vogüé

Academic work
- Era: 20th century
- School or tradition: Narodnism; Libertarian socialism; Aestheticism; Formalism
- Institutions: Russian Free University; Sarah Lawrence College; Institute for Slavic Philology (La Sapienza University)
- Main interests: Political theory, Russian studies, Russian literature, Comparative literature

Mark Lvovich Slonim (Russian: Марк Льво́вич Сло́ним, also known as Marc Slonim and Marco Slonim; March 23, 1894 – 1976) was a Russian politician, literary critic, scholar and translator. He was a lifelong member of the Socialist Revolutionary Party, and, in 1917, served as its deputy for Bessarabia in the Russian Constituent Assembly. He joined the Samara Government during the early phases of the Civil War, opposing both the Bolsheviks and the conservative elements of the White movement. Assigned to his party's Foreign Delegation, Slonim lobbied unsuccessfully for the return of Bessarabia to Russia during the Paris Peace Conference. After a short stay in Tuscany, he settled in Czechoslovakia in 1922, an editor of Volya Rossii review.

Slonim, who was also an Italian-trained literary scholar, became Volya Rossii's literary theorist and columnist. From that vantage point, he gave encouraged the liberal-progressive and modernist side of the White émigré intellectuals. Slonim argued, against conservatives such as Zinaida Gippius, that the exiles needed to appreciate changes occurring in the Soviet Union and became one of the first popularizers of Soviet writers in the West. He was also one of the main backers (and an intimate friend) of poet Marina Tsvetaeva.

In 1928, convinced that Russian literature in exile was in fact dead, Slonim moved to Paris and, as an anti-fascist, opened up to Soviet patriotism. His 1930s contacts with the Union for Repatriation were particularly controversial. He escaped World War II and arrived to the United States aboard the SS Navemar, spending the 1940s and '50s as a teacher at Sarah Lawrence College. He continued to publish tracts and textbooks on Russian literary topics, familiarizing the American public with the major trends of Soviet poetry and fiction. He spent his final years in Geneva, where he translated Andrei Bely's Silver Dove and worked sporadically on his memoirs.

== Biography ==
=== Early activities ===
Slonim was born in the Russian Empire's port city of Odessa (now in Ukraine), although some sources mistakenly have Novgorod-Severskiy, Chernihiv Governorate. His elder brother Vladimir was also born in Odessa in 1887. Their parents were upper-middle-class Russian Jewish intellectuals; Slonim's uncle was the literary critic Yuly Aykhenvald. The future critic was also a distant relative of Yevsey Lazarevich Slonim, whose daughter, Vera Yevseyevna, became the wife of novelist Vladimir Nabokov. According to Russologist Michel Aucouturier, Slonim's memoirs show him as an erudite and an adept of aestheticism, whose "socialist sympathies" were only cemented by the Russian Revolution. While completing his secondary studies at a classical gymnasium in Odessa, Slonim came into contact with the Socialist Revolutionaries (or "Esers"), and, like his older brother Vladimir before him, became their follower. Their radicalism pitted them against their father, who supported the moderate-liberal Kadet Party.

Slonim, who regarded himself as a libertarian socialist rather than a Marxist, worked on establishing "self-instruction circles", circulating banned literature among students, artisans and workers, and traveled to Europe to meet with Osip Minor. As he recalled in the 1960s, the Eser leadership was "appalled to discover than in Odessa and the nearby region most of the work was being done by boys and girls of 16 or 17." According to later sources, he was brought to the attention of the Okhrana and left Russia surreptitiously. From 1911, he studied philosophy and literature at the University of Florence, where he took his Ph.D. In 1914, he published in Italy a translation of Ivan Turgenev's poetry cicle, Senility. By 1918, Slonim was also a graduate of Saint Petersburg Imperial University.

Upon the start of World War I, Slonim followed the "defensist" line of the Eser mainstream, supporting Russia's commitment to the Allies, and served in the Imperial Army. The February Revolution caught him on the Romanian Front, but he soon returned to Petrograd, where (Aucouturier writes) "his talents as a propagandist and an orator soon made him one of his party's celebrities". Slonim supported the Russian Provisional Government and its "defensist" policies against the Left Esers, with public disputations against Vladimir Karelin and Maria Spiridonova. According to Slonim, he was one of the youths left in charge of party work: the more senior Esers were either in government or consumed by work in the Soviet of Workers' and Soldiers' Deputies.

=== Constituent Assembly and Paris Conference ===
In his memoirs, Slonim claims to have foreseen the danger posed by the reorganized Bolsheviks, having heard their leader, Vladimir Lenin, speak. He contrasts Bolshevik unity with the Esers' indecisiveness and factionalism. He was still active after the October Revolution, which placed Russia under a Bolshevik Council of People's Commissars. Slonim became an Eser candidate for the Russian Constituent Assembly in the November 25 election, running in the southwestern province of Bessarabia. He took his seat in the Eser landslide win, and, aged 23, was the youngest parliamentarian. Days after, Bessarabia formed its own government as the Moldavian Democratic Republic, and remained undecided about its future within the Russian Republic. The elections for the Constituent Assembly were chaotic, and the results were never fully recorded.

Slonim was present in the Assembly on the morning of January 19, 1918, when the Bolsheviks dissolved it by force and opened fire on the supporting crowds. For a while, he was in the Ukrainian State, helping Gregory Zilboorg put out a clandestine paper which angered both the Bolsheviks and the Ukrainian nationalists. He later fled to Samara, where the Constituent Assembly had formed its own "Committee of Members" government. He joined the latter, then, upon its merger into the Provisional All-Russian Government, moved to Omsk. As the Russian Civil War took hold of the countryside, Slonim followed the Czechoslovak Legion and became friends with its leaders, trailing across Siberia under an assumed name. Nevertheless, he disliked the concept of Allied intervention, and moved closer to the Left Esers. His party sent him abroad as a member of its Foreign Delegation, which originally existed to persuade the West not to recognize Alexander Kolchak as Russia's Supreme Ruler.

In November 1918, Slonim had lost his Bessarabian constituency, as the region united with Romania. The writer became a strong critic of that merger, claiming that the Romanian identity in both Romania and Bessarabia had been recently fabricated by intellectuals, lacking popular support among the Moldavian peasants (see Moldovenism). Slonim also claimed that the union process had been triggered by the German Empire in late 1917, as an anti-Bolshevik move, and supported by Russians who had discarded "personal and national dignity." Building on such arguments, Slonim depicted the Russian Empire as a functional and organic economic entity, suggesting that Bessarabia had more in common with Ukraine than with Romania. He also argued that Bessarabia had not been renounced by Russia, not truly annexed by the Romanian Kingdom. "Sooner of later", he suggested, "there must come about [Bessarabia's] reunion with the Russian State." Acknowledging that there was a "united front" between the White movement and Soviet Russia on the Bessarabian issue, he proposed to overcome the impasse by organizing a League of Nations referendum in the former Moldavian Republic. Scholar Charles Upson Clark, who sees Slonim's accounts as among "the best [...] from the Russian standpoint", rejects his theory about the German inspiration for the union, noting that it was in fact a traditional Romanian goal.

Slonim joined a self-appointed team of politicians and landowners who claimed to speak for Bessarabia, and attended the Paris Peace Conference to lobby for the Russian cause. Among the other members of this body were Alexander N. Krupensky, Alexandr K. Schmidt, Vladimir Tsyganko, and Mihail Savenco. Slonim, seconded by Tsyganko, circulated rumors of "unheard-of atrocities" committed by the Romanian Army, such as the massacre of 53 people in one village of after the Khotyn Uprising, and the torturing of many others. Interviewed by L'Humanité, the French Communist Party paper, Slonim also claimed the socialists were being repressed, and that unconditional union had been voted on "under the menace of machine guns". These statements were rejected outright by the Bessarabian unionists: Ion Inculeț, the former President of the Moldavian Republic, called the interview "idiotic", while his aide Ion Pelivan wrote to L'Humanité to restate that the union was expressing the free will of the Bessarabian people. In his notes, Pelivan referred to Slonim as a "deserter", an "impostor", and a Belarusian Jew.

=== Tuscany, Berlin, and Volya Rossii ===
Slonim spent the years 1919–1922 in Tuscany, becoming a regular contributor to the leftist daily Il Secolo. In an article of August 1920, he opined that only "peace with Russia" and "the complete renunciation of all intervention into [her] internal affairs" could ensure the demise of "Bolshevist imperialism". That year, he published at H. Bemporad & figlio an Italian-language work on the revolutionary ideologies of Béla Kun and the Spartacus League, eponymously titled Spartaco e Bela Kun, and two memoirs: La rivoluzione russa ("The Russian Revolution"), and Il bolscevismo visto da un russo ("Bolshevism as Seen by a Russian"). The latter was translated into French the following year, as Le Bolchévisme vu par un russe. La Revue Critique des Idées et des Livres described it as "abundant in little facts from experience", a fresco "of the general misery, terror and fright that have been reigning in Russia for these past three years." His thoughts on communism brought him to the attention of Benito Mussolini, leader of the Fasci Italiani, who invited Slonim to write for Il Popolo d'Italia. Slonim explained that he would never write for the right-wing press; in a later reply, Mussolini insisted that his budding fascist movement was not in fact reactionary.

Another work, tracing the historical background of Bolshevism and the Esers, appeared in 1921 as Da Pietro il Grande a Lenin: Storia del movimento rivoluzionario in Russia ("From Peter the Great to Lenin: History of the Revolutionary Movement in Russia"); a French edition came out in 1933, at Éditions Gallimard. It was chronicled by the Romanian essayist Vasile Lovinescu as a good introduction to the ideological threads connecting communism and Tsarist autocracy; however, Lovinescu also introduced Slonim as a "militant communist", arguing that his perspective could be viewed as impartial, rather than as biased against Lenin. Slonim followed up with an essay on Bolshevik Proletkult and Futurism, taken up by Henri Grégoire's monthly, Le Flambeau (October 1921). At this early stage, he derided Soviet literary productions, and described the better poets (Alexander Blok and Andrei Bely) as incompatible with communist dogmas.

After a short stay in Berlin, during which time he issued his own journal, Novosti Literatury, Slonim settled in Prague, Czechoslovakia, where he taught at the Russian Free University and joined the local Zemgor. He was also co-opted to write for the Russian-language émigré magazine Volya Rossii ("Russia's Will", "Russia's Freedom", or "Russia's Free Will"). Its editorial board included Slonim (editorial secretary to 1923, later full editor), Sergey Postnikov, Evsei Stalinskii, Vasily Sukhomlin, and Vladimir I. Lebedev. The former four were all members of the Eser Foreign Delegation; Lebedev was not. Occupying a Prague building which had reputedly housed Mozart, and also gathering for conversations at Národní kavárna café, the circle members networked with European policymakers such as Aristide Briand, Tomáš Garrigue Masaryk, and Émile Vandervelde. Although it published noted works of literature, including Marina Tsvetaeva's Rat-Catcher, Volya Rossii had a small readership. It depended largely on Czechoslovak government support, but the subsidies grew thinner by the year. Originally a daily in 1920, it became a weekly in 1922, and a monthly in 1923.

From its relaunch in 1923, Volya Rossii was primarily noted as an exponent of the political left, and as such a rival of the more eclectic, Paris-based, Sovremennye Zapiski. Its acceptance of various Bolshevik reforms made it close to the Mladorossi émigrés, but the magazine saw itself as eminently Narodnik, carrying through the ideology of Alexander Herzen and Nikolay Chernyshevsky. Beyond them, Slonim saw himself as a legatee of the Decembrists. Volya Rossii was explicitly against the Kadet émigrés in Paris, and fought with their leader, Pyotr Struve, for control over the Russian Free University. It also took a secular approach to anti-communism, decrying the émigrés' debt to Russian Orthodoxy—the church, Slonim asserted, was not a true foundation of Russian identity and culture. These positions were summarized in Slonim's sarcastic characterization of Sovremennye Zapiski, a "non-partisan voice of the liberal-democratic broad front, with some tendencies that are sometimes socialist, sometimes religious."

=== Literary columnist ===
Volya Rossii stated its support for "moral socialism", relying on "the spontaneous activity and creativity of the masses." While the group rallied around Slonim's ideas about Russian organicism and post-imperial federalism, it also firmly rejected expressions of Russian nationalism, envisioning a Russia that rejected "all differences of faith, race or religion". Slonim himself was a noted adversary of Eurasianism and theories of Russian exceptionalism, which understood Bolshevism as compatible with nationalist ideas. He interpreted Bolshevism as a "Jacobin" experiment in state control; he still believed in the regime's inevitable failure, and in the reemergence of democratic Russia. However, as he reported to Alexander Kerensky, the Prague Esers feared the growth of the Czechoslovakia's Communist Party, which could turn on the émigré community.

While contributing articles on political news and historical sketches, as well as impressions from a 1926 trip to the United States and a 1928 homage to Prague, Slonim became the main literary chronicler at Volya Rossii. He believed that the importance of Russian literature was to be found in its ability to convey "the vital problems of individual and social existence", and hoped that this tradition would be carried on in exile: "We know that the best among [émigré writers] made their way through suffering and struggle." Before 1925, Slonim focused his polemics on Zinaida Gippius, whose articles in Sovremennye Zapiski prophesied the death of Russian literature. Chiding the "old guard" of Russian literati, he argued instead that modern literature was thriving both in Russia and in exile. From then on, Gippius came to regard Slonim with intense hostility, particularly since he also promoted Tsvetaeva, her personal enemy.

While their Acmeist rival Georgy Adamovich wanted to see through the emergence of a Russian psychological novel, Slonim and Ivan Bunin believed that psychological introspection and social realism could still blend into a coherent whole: "spiritual vicissitudes had to be illustrated from the outside so that the reader could see them." They urged émigrés to follow modernist developments and replicate steps taken in Soviet literature. As a reviewer of Soviet works, Slonim identified echoes of the 19th-century philosophical and political epics, showing up in novels by Yevgeny Zamyatin, Boris Pasternak, Vsevolod Ivanov and Yury Olesha. He looked with political optimism to the unfolding of the New Economic Policy, which took Russia back to grassroots capitalism. Slonim searched for clues that communist writers were growing disenchanted with the Soviet state, and kept records about the "more tiresome and woeful" literature of agitprop.

In order to illustrate such points, Volya Rossii published fragments of works by Zamyatin, but also by Isaac Babel and Mikhail Sholokhov, alongside Guillaume Apollinaire or Karel Čapek. Volya Rossii soon patronized a generation of émigré modernists, beginning with Tsvetaeva and Aleksey Remizov, followed later by Nina Berberova, Dovid Knut, Valentin Parnakh, Vladimir Pozner, Gleb Struve, and Yuri Terapiano. However, Slonim's encouragement had a perverse effect: in Russia, authors praised by Slonim or sampled in Volya Rossii were singled out as potential enemies of the regime. In 1927, the magazine hosted fragments from Zamyatin's novel We, the first publication of that work in its original Russian. In order not to expose the author's direct contacts with the émigrés, Slonim claimed that these were back-translations from Czech and English reprints. Later, Slonim's positive reviews of Krasnaya Nov' magazine were used against its editor, Aleksandr Voronsky, who was eventually purged from the Soviet Communist Party.

Slonim became a backer of Tsvetaeva and her husband Sergei Efron, who had settled in Prague. Together with Salomeya Halpern, Hélène Iswolsky, D. S. Mirsky and Lebedev, he organized a Committee to Assist Marina Tsvetaeva. He became a friend, confidant, and dedicated promoter of Tsvetaeva, even though she declined interest in Eser ideology and political matters in general. They continued to disagree over politics, whenever Tsvetaeva made a public show of her loyalty for the House of Romanov. Their liaison had romantic undertones: to Tsvetaeva, he was "the dear one", and his departure to be with another woman inspired her to write the poem "Attempt at Jealousy". Thinking that she held an idealized view of him, Slonim, newly separated from his first wife, rejected her advances in 1924, but they remained friends. He was critical of her affair with K. B. Rodzevitch, whom he regarded as a "dull, mediocre" man.

=== Move to Paris ===
By the late 1920s, Slonim had come to share Gippius' opinion that Russian literature in exile was doomed, its links with the Russian soil forever severed. He noted that, from 1926 on, the Foreign Delegation had only relied on Soviet publications for understanding the goings-on in Russia, and argued that Soviet literature could be followed for its documentary value. He himself published an introduction to Russian literature in the 1927 edition of Slovanský Přehled. His skepticism was also showing in his political essays, where he asserted that the Eser cause had been stifled by the 1922 Show Trials. By then, the Esers' Prague group had become torn between two camps, each accusing the other of serving the Soviets. One was led by Viktor Chernov, the other (comprising the Volya Rossii group) was headed by Sukhomlin. Slonim also had a quarrel with writer Vasily Yanovsky—reportedly, because he commented on Yanovsky's poor use of Russian and his borrowings from Mikhail Artsybashev.

In 1927, Slonim purchased a printing press in Paris, where he hoped to relaunch Volya Rossii. He ultimately abandoned the plan and, in 1928, simply relocated to Paris, together with Stalinskii and Sukhomlin. They reinforced a Russian colony that was just growing in importance, as French interest in Russian affairs was about to peak. Volya Rossii continued to appear in Prague until March 1932, when it closed down as a result of the Chernov scandal. In its last years, it supported the Right Opposition and the Five-Year Plan, seeing them as evidence of Soviet normalization, and a promise for Eser uprisings. Lebedev even claimed to have traveled inside the Soviet Union. Slonim remained skeptical of this "mysticism", while also noting that the expanding Stalinist regime had emerged from industrialization as a "petty bourgeois" force, its appeal increased among émigré monarchists and Eurasianists. His articles were regularly featured in other émigré publications: Sotsialist-Revolyutsioner, Problemy and Novaya Gazeta in Paris; Russkiy Arkhiv of Belgrade; and the American Moskva.

Slonim was focusing his attention on writing counter-propaganda descriptions of Socialist Realism, which was entering the official Soviet literary and political discourse under Joseph Stalin. Readers of his work provide contrasting reviews: Aucouturier finds his 1930 study on Stalinism in Literature "important"; however, according to the Russian sociologist Evgeny Dobrenko, Slonim's contribution here "overstep[s] the boundaries of scholarship." Although he still upheld the old Narodnik values, Slonim favored aestheticism and formalism over social determinism, and, on these grounds, criticized Pavel Milyukov's work in literary history. He also looked for tensions between the official dogma and writers who still cultivated individualism in its various forms, citing works by Pasternak, Artyom Vesyoly, Yury Libedinsky, and Leonid Leonov. He welcomed Stalin's decision to disband the Russian Association of Proletarian Writers, seeing it as a "Charter of Liberation" for the nonconformist authors.

In Paris, Slonim set up his own literary society, Kochev'ye ("Camp of Nomads"), its name probably alluding to the primitivist aesthetics of the Left Esers. It held weekly session opposite Gare Montparnasse, until 1938, when it dissolved. Like Nikolai Berdyaev and Nicholas Zernov, Slonim also attached himself to the French Catholic circles, which welcomed Russian liberals who were at once anti-communist and anti-fascist. He was also close to avant-garde painters Mikhail Larionov and Natalia Goncharova, whom he introduced to Efron and Tsvetaeva when the latter couple also settled in Paris. In 1933, he attended a symposium grouping Chisla magazine writers and members of the French Communist Party, discussing André Gide's account of life in the Soviet Union. The meeting veered into scandal when (according to Slonim's account) he took the rostrum and informed both camps that Gide was not in fact a convert to communism, and that "instead of making loud pronouncement they had better read Gide's oeuvre."

=== Impresario and Soviet "defensist" ===
Slonim's work diversified, and he became a literary impresario, founding, with George Reavey, the European Literary Bureau. It had contracts with Berdyaev, Samuel Beckett, André Malraux and Jacques Maritain. He also worked on translations and on editing books for print: in 1930, Čestmír Jeřábek's Svět hoří; and in 1934, Adèle Hommaire de Hell's Mémoires d'une aventurière. Together with Reavey, he put out one of the first collections of Russian prose rendered in English (1934), which is also noted for its inclusion of Socialist Realists Alexander Fadeyev and Feodor Gladkov. With Gide's help, Slonim and Reavey's anthology of Soviet literature came out at Gallimard in 1935, and possibly included unsigned translations by Tsvetaeva. Slonim was by then also publishing regular literary chronicles, turning his attention to works by William Faulkner, Peter Neagoe, and D. H. Lawrence.

Slonim was for years critical of émigrés who asked to be resettled in the Soviet Union, denouncing Efron's work for the NKVD-sponsored Union for Repatriation. In 1935, He finally met Zamyatin, who had escaped Russia, and they "became very good friends"—before Zamyatin's sudden illness and death. Slonim's own theories regarding the role of communism in interrupting the traditions of Russian literature was positively cited in the United States by Max Eastman, whom the Soviets themselves regarded as a "Troskyist". According to the official Soviet narrative, the Eastman–Slonim connection was central to the establishment of American Sovietology, which the Soviets themselves regarded as a pseudoscience; Slonim matched "the strategic goals of anti-communist ideologists", namely "to compromise Soviet literature and Soviet cultural policy in the eyes of Western readers."

In 1934, Slonim had resumed his conferencing on Lenin, networking with Italian anti-fascists such as Oddino Morgari and Alberto Meschi, and being followed around by Mussolini's OVRA. He and Lebedev became alarmed by the rise of Nazi Germany, and predicted that it would attack the Soviet Union with support from the right-wing exiles. With this in mind, they founded in 1936 a Russian Émigré Defensist Movement (REOD), its newspaper edited by Slonim. After such geopolitical shifts, Slonim came to agree with the basic tenets of Soviet thinking: he believed that democracy was doomed, and that the world was becoming split into two camps, of communism and fascism. He formulated his preference into a socialist-patriotic manifesto:

The defensist joyfully greets all tidings of the internal and external successes of Russia. When a new factory is built in the Soviet Union, when a strong army is created, when a heroic flight is made, when important discoveries are made and when a talented book is written, the defensist feels a sense of pride.

He put out in 1935 a sympathetic book on the ill-fated expedition of SS Chelyuskin, followed in 1937 by Les onzes républiques soviétiques ("The Eleven Soviet Republics"), at Éditions Payot. The latter book was well-liked in the Soviet Union itself, and recommended by Intourist, but criticized by Pierre Pascal for its geographical and historical inaccuracies. In 1938, Slonim also translated Viktor Shklovsky's Voyage de Marco Polo. However, he had grown more appreciative of the Sovremennye Zapiski writers, and in 1939, published generous commentary on Vladimir Nabokov's work, beginning with King, Queen, Knave. That year, Slonim also completed a version of Bunin's Liberation of Tolstoy, published by Gallimard but disliked by the author.

When Lebedev abandoned the REOD and moved to America in 1936, Slonim continued his work. This was an especially controversial decision, as the REOD became exposed for its links with the Union for Repatriation and the NKVD. Slonim ultimately presented his resignation in July 1938. In June 1939, he met Tsvetaeva one final time in Paris, as she and Efron began their return trip to the Soviet Union. Slonim was still in Paris after the Nazi–Soviet Pact and before the Nazi invasion of France. Arrested for his contacts with the French communists, he was sent to a French concentration camp. By August 1941, he was in Spain, taking the SS Navemar from Seville to New York City. He completed the journey, despite the Navemar's "criminally inadequate" facilities, alongside friends Zosa Szajkowski and Mark Zborowski.

=== Sarah Lawrence College ===
Slonim initially lectured on Russian topics at Yale, Chicago and Penn, before becoming, in 1943, a professor of Russian and comparative literature at Sarah Lawrence College, Yonkers. While publishing various pieces in American academic journals, Slonim also contributed to the Jewish cultural review Yevreiski Mir. In a 1944 article for that magazine (quoted favorably by scholar Simon Markish), he denied the existence of a separate Jewish literature in Russia, proposing that Jewish authors were merely Russian authors. His stance in this far-reaching debate about Jewish assimilation was similar to that of his uncle Aykhenvald, including their proposed reference to Jewish writers as "writers who are Jews". In late 1944, he lectured at the Phillips Academy East and West Association on the issue of Russia–United States relations.

Slonim was viewed with caution by the American Esers. They investigated his REOD activity and concluded that he had shown callousness, and had mixed with NKVD envoys, but cleared him of allegations that he had been a spy himself. Following the Nazi attack on the Soviet Union, Slonim and his colleagues, reunited in New York City, resumed the "defensist" line, unconditionally; Chernov took a more moderate stance. In February 1945, Slonim finally met Nabokov at a dinner party in New York. Nabokov dismissed him as a Soviet agent, and probably used him as an inspiration for the novella Double Talk. Nabokov's reading is dismissed by his exegetes: Vladimir E. Alexandrov speaks of Nabokov's "unjustified suspicions, including his snubbing of Marc Slonim"; Brian Boyd also notes that Slonim "was in fact firmly against Stalin and the Soviet system." Before 1950, Slonim was again banned in the Soviet Union and the Eastern bloc: copies of Le Bolchévisme vu par un russe were confiscated on sight by the Romanian Propaganda Ministry.

In 1950, Oxford University Press released Slonim's literary panorama, The Epic of Russian Literature; from Its Origins Through Tolstoy. According to the Revue des Études Slaves, it was an "intelligent and alert" work, appealing "to the cultivated public rather than the specialists". The Epic, echoing the approach of Eugène-Melchior de Vogüé, focused on the 19th-century novels and debates, being more dismissive of earlier literature. He followed up in 1953 with a second volume, Modern Russian Literature, covering the period from Anton Chekhov to the 1950s, and a biographical study, Tri lyubi Dostoyevskogo ("Three Loves of Dostoevsky"). He returned to Italy on a research trip, employed by La Sapienza University's Institute for Slavic Philology, and, in 1954, edited the collection Modern Italian Short Stories. Also that year, which coincided with the peak of McCarthyism, he appeared before the Jenner Committee, dismissing rumors of communist activities at Sarah Lawrence.

Additionally, Slonim worked with Harvey Breit on a Signet anthology of love stories, which appeared in 1955 as This Thing Called Love. In 1959, he lectured at Vassar on Pasternak's philosophical outlook. A year later, he commemorated Pasternak by moderating a round table for Radio Liberty. Guests included Reavey, B. J. Chute, Herbert Gold, Ferenc Körmendi, and Santha Rama Rau. Also in 1960, he collected and edited for print selections from Mikhail Zoshchenko's satires (as Izbrannoe). In parallel, he arranged for print the diaries of Leonid Andreyev. That project was put on hold by son Vadim Andreyev, for fear that disclosing Leonid's opinions on Bolshevism would make the ban on his work permanent.

=== Final years ===
According to Aucouturier, Slonim stands out as "one of the first independent critics of the USSR's literary output [and] a pioneer of Soviet literary historiography in the Occident." Italian writer Italo Calvino, who visited Sarah Lawrence College in 1959, called Slonim "the most famous expert on Russian literature in America". Philologist Melissa Frazier sees him as an "incredibly significant figure in the phenomenon of Russian émigré culture". She notes:

Slonim did a lot more in the way of plot summary—but in the polarized world of the Cold War, even plot summary was hugely important. [...] He was one of the few in the West actually reading what was being written in the Soviet Union with the recognition that there were still great writers who had stayed behind.

Slonim retired from Sarah Lawrence in 1962, and from teaching in 1965, living the rest of his life in Switzerland, where he was animator of a Russian literary club. In 1963–1964, from his new home in Geneva, Slonim worked on an English version of Andrei Bely's Silver Dove, and corresponded over literary details with Maria Olsufyeva, who had finished translating that same novel into Italian. Slonim's last standalone book was the 1964 textbook Soviet Russian Literature. Writers and Problems, praised by Revue des Études Slaves for its "sense of balance", but criticized for its "allusive nature". Social historian Lawrence H. Schwartz notes its "vitriolic" critique of the Union of Soviet Writers.

Slonim also contributed regularly to reviews and encyclopedias, answering queries posed by his younger colleagues, and supporting the Sarah Lawrence graduate program in Switzerland. Some of his final articles defended a fellow critic, Andrei Sinyavsky, who had angered the Soviet establishment with his reading of Alexander Pushkin. In late 1968, he staged a letter-writing campaign in support of the Soviet writer-dissident Aleksandr Solzhenitsyn. His historical essay on Volya Rossii was published in 1972, as part of Nikolai Poltoratsky's review of Russian literature in exile. He also arranged for print Sofiya Pregel's Last Poems (1973). The verdicts he had produced regarding the mainstream Soviet literary output continued to be viewed as unpalatable in the communist east. In 1975, Bulgarian critic Alexander Dunchev described him as one of the "bourgeois authors [who] slander socialist realism".

Slonim died in 1976 in the French resort of Beaulieu-sur-Mer. His incomplete memoirs, covering the period up to October 1917, were handed by his widow, Tatiana, to Aucouturier, who published them in Cahiers du Monde Russe et Soviétique. Tatiana Slonim continued to live in Geneva. In 1986, she donated her husband's 16th-century copy of the Theotokos of Vladimir to the city's Art and History Museum.
