= Albanians in Ukraine =

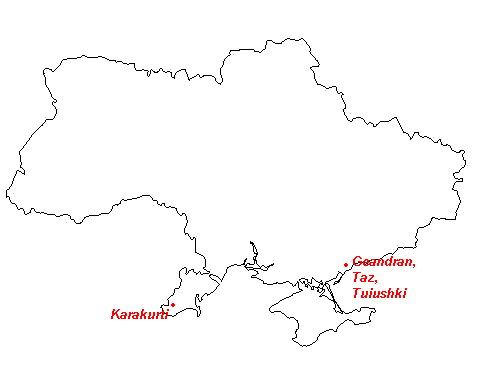
- Main Albanian settlements in Ukraine

Total population
- 3308 (2001) - ~5,000 (2008)

Regions with significant populations
- Odesa Oblast (Budjak) 1,862 (2001) - ~3,000; Zaporizhzhia Oblast 892 (2001) - ~2,000; Donets basin and Kyiv - several dozens (2001)

Languages
- Albanian, Ukrainian, Russian

Religion
- Orthodox Christian and Catholic Christian

The Albanians in Ukraine (Ukrainian: Албанці в Україні (арнаути); Albanian: Shqiptarët në Ukrainë) are an ethnic minority group located mainly in Zaporizhzhia Oblast and Budjak. They descend from Albanian warriors who fought against the Ottoman Empire in the Russo-Turkish wars and were allowed to settle in the Russian Empire in the 18th century.

== History ==
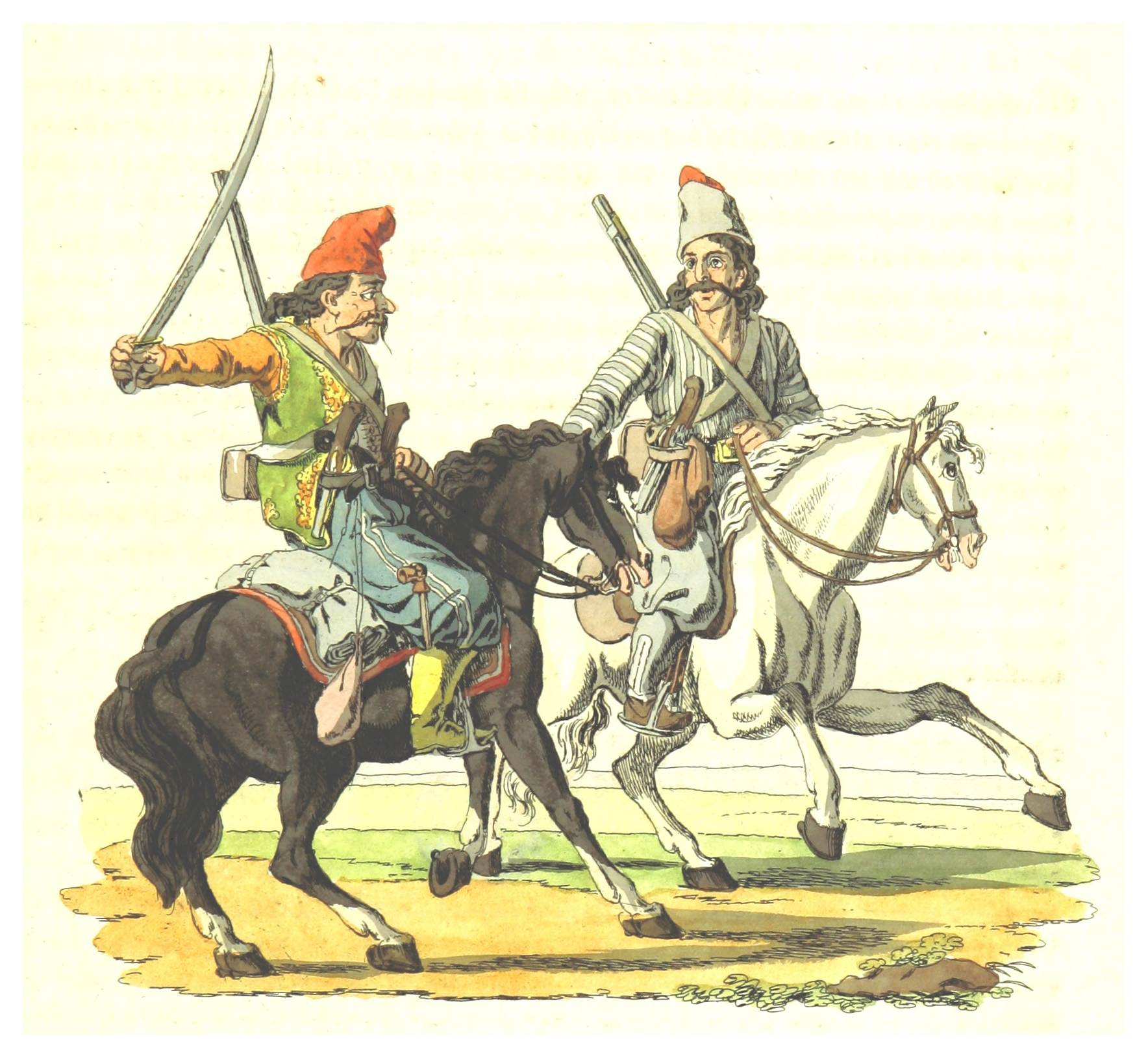
Arnauts in the Crimea (1807)

The historical community of Albanians in Ukraine call themselves ga tantë (from ours) and they speak a language si neve (like us). Their ancestors came to Ukraine in the 18th and 19th centuries. Yet, they trace their ancestry to Tosk Albanians (southern dialect) who in the 16th century settled in eastern Bulgaria (Despotate of Dobruja) along with Gagauz people. The arrival of the Albanians was connected to the Russo-Turkish War of 1768-1774. During this war some Orthodox Christian Albanians revolted against the power of the Ottoman Empire. After their rebellion initially failed many joined up with the Russian fleet which was on its Aegean Expedition. At the end of the war about 1,700 Albanian fighters and family members went to the Russian Empire. They settled primarily in the vicinity of Kerch and Yenikale. Some Albanian immigrants to the Russian Empire from Bulgaria settled primarily in the vicinity of Odesa and Budzhak. In 1811 Albanians established their own settlement of Karakurt in Budzhak near the Bolhrad city. After the Albanians in Odesa there are two streets Great Arnaut Street and Little Arnaut Street. Due to defeat of Russia in the Crimean War, many Albanians moved to east Ukraine in 1861 and resettled there. It was not until the 20th century that the Albanians of Ukraine realized that there are Albanians. At some point of time in Odesa existed the Albanian cultural center "Rilindja" (Renaissance).

=== Contemporary History ===
In 1911, Albanian Orthodox priest and national awakening figure Fan Noli met there with members the community in Odesa, and held a mass in the local church. In 1979, Friar Arthur Liolini of the Albanian Orthodox Church of Boston held mass in the same church. Their most important religious feast is that of St. George, which is in veneration of George Castriot.

During the Stalinist regime in USSR, better off members of the community were deported to Siberia, none returned alive. In many cases, some of their population was shipped to different regions of the USSR in order to promote assimilation. Thus, the Albanian village communities in Ukraine is one of the poorer communities in the country. Their utensils and supplies speak of their backwardness in comparison to the rest of the country. However, their culture is not fully assimilated to the greater Ukrainian culture, many still claim to be Albanian, and buy and drink Albanian beers and raki. Use of Albanian is also less common than previously but still apparent, many continue to wear traditional costumes and keep to old traditions, such as the giving of homemade bread to guests.

=== Albanian studies in the Soviet Union and Russia ===
The first who studied the Albanians in Ukraine since 1914 was a Soviet philologist (Slavic studies) and historian Nikolai Derzhavin who was born on the territory of modern Zaporizhzhia Oblast (at the time Taurida Governorate). In 1930, he published his monograph, "Albanians in the Ukraine", in Russian. After World War II, the major study on Albanians of the Southern Ukraine was conducted by the academician of the Russian Academy of Sciences Yulia Ivanova. In 1957 with help of the academician Agnia Desnitskaya at the Saint Petersburg State University was opened the Department of Albanian language. Alas, in contemporary Ukraine Albanian studies are not being conducted.

== Geography and demographics ==
=== Geography ===
By the late 20th Century, only a few years before the fall of the USSR the Albanians of Ukraine were mainly concentrated in Zaporizhzhia Oblast in Pryazovske Raion: Geandran, today (Hamivka), Taz (today Divnyns'ke) and Tuiushki (today Heorhiivka). There is also an Albanian village in Budjak, Bolhrad Raion of Odesa Oblast: Karakurt (Karakurt in Albanian, Caracurt in Romanian, Каракурт (Karakurt) in Ukrainian.

=== Demographics ===
In 1958 they numbered 5,258 in the entire Soviet Union. Their number had fallen to 4,402 by 1970.

== Notable Albanians ==
- Alemdar Mustafa Pasha – Ottoman military commander and a Grand Vizier
- Lola Gjoka – Albanian pianist
- Fjodor Dermentli (uk), Ukrainian economist and industrialist of Albanian descent

== Legacy ==
- The city of Odesa has two streets, Great Arnaut Street and Little Arnaut Street, Arnaut being an ethnonym for Albanian.

== See also ==
- Albania–Ukraine relations
- Names of the Albanians and Albania
- Arbanasi
- Albanians of Romania
- Arnaut
- Albanian diaspora
- Immigration to Ukraine

== Sources ==
- Wixman, Ronald. The Peoples of the USSR: An Ethnographic Handbook. (Armonk, New York: M. E. Sharpe, Inc, 1984) p. 8
- Olson, James S., An Ethnohistorical Dictionary of the Russian and Soviet Empires. (Westport: Greenwood Press, 1994) p. 28-29

== External sources ==
- Albanian dialects spoken in the Black Sea region
