= Elena Alistar =

Bessarabian politician (1873–1955)

Elena Alistar-Romanescu
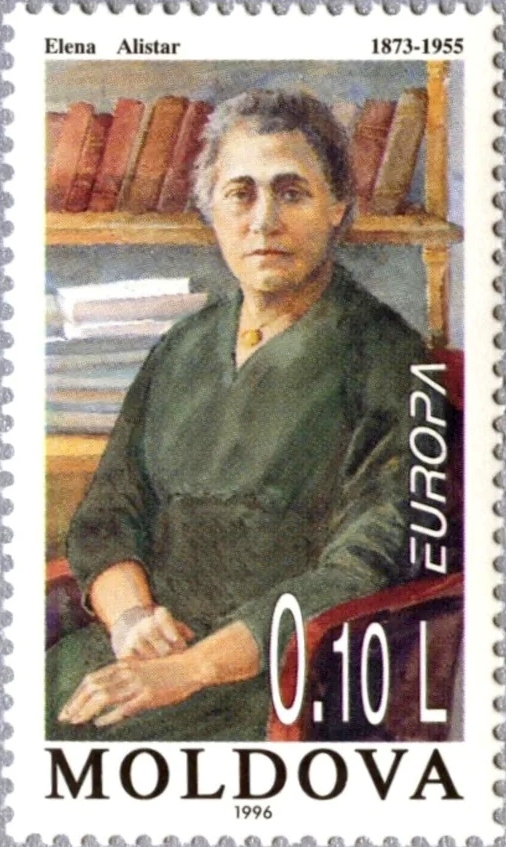
- Alistar on a 1996 stamp of Moldova

Member of Sfatul Țării
- In office 1917–1918

Personal details
- Born: 1 June 1873 Vaisal, Ismail County, Romania
- Died: 1955 (aged 81–82) Pucioasa, Ploiești Region, Romanian People's Republic
- Resting place: Bellu Cemetery, Bucharest
- Party: Moldavian National Party
- Spouse: Dumitru Alistar
- Education: Medical Faculty of the University of Iași
- Occupation: politician
- Profession: physician

Elena Alistar-Romanescu (1 June 1873 – 1955) was a Bessarabian physician and politician who was part of Sfatul Țării from Bessarabia.

She was the aunt of poet Magda Isanos.

== Biography ==
Alistar was born on 1 June 1873 in Vaisal commune, at the time in Ismail County, Romania (now in Odesa Oblast, Ukraine). According to some historical sources, she was of Bessarabian origin. She was born in a family of priest Vasile Bălan. Her mother was Elisabeta Bălan. She graduated from primary school of Congaz of Cahul County, and then, attended the Chișinău Eparchial School. There she met the young theologian Dumitru Alistar. They married. After a while, her husband became a priest and she followed him. Since 1890, she worked as a teacher in the such villages as Văleni, Roșu, Zîrnești, Cahul, Rezeni, and Chișinău. After her husband's death, she was encouraged by the journalist Mihai Vântu to leave for Iași, Romania. In 1909–1916, she attended the Medical Faculty of the University of Iași. She was arrested for "nationalistic activity" together with the members of Daniel Ciugureanu's group. The group has claimed the need for forced liberation of Bessarabia from the Russian influence. In 1916, she was recruited by the army as a military doctor. She continued to practice medicine at Costiujeni Hospital near Chișinău.

She was the member of the Moldavian National Party and was elected as an MP from the Cetatea Albă County for the Sfatul Țării. She was one of the two women elected as MP, and actively took part in the political events that led to Bessarabia's unification with Romania. On 27 March 1918, she voted for the Union of Bessarabia with Romania. The other woman MP, Nadejda Grinfeld, was shot by the Romanian Army for opposing such an unification.

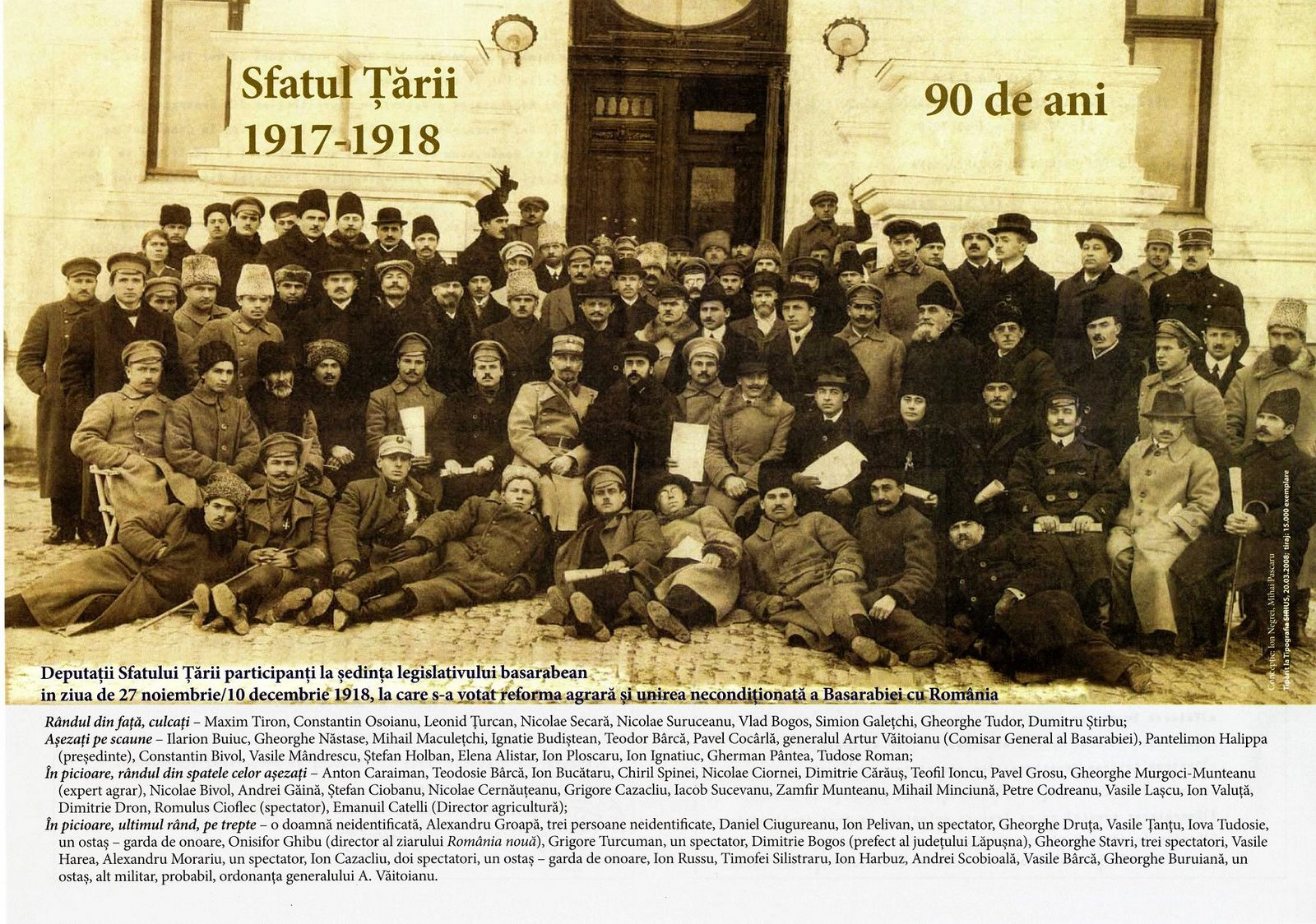
Sfatul Țării Palace, 10 December 1918; Alistar is seated in second row, fifth from the right

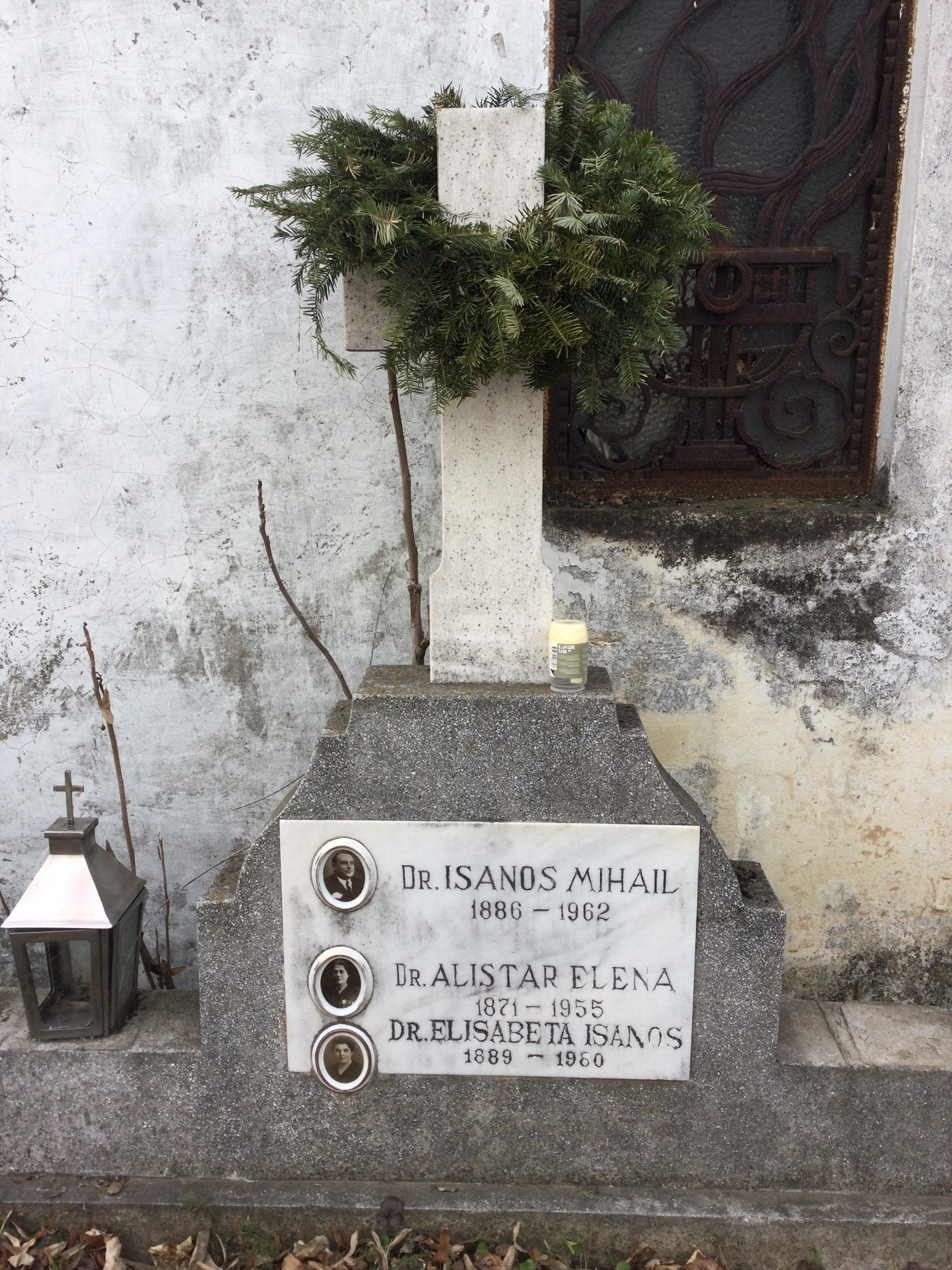
Grave in Bellu Cemetery

Alistar founded the Women's Cultural League of Bessarabia. She was the president of the People's Party, founded by Mareșal Alexandru Averescu, who was also originally from Babele, a commune near Izmail, Budjak which was at the time in the United Principalities of Moldavia and Wallachia and is now in Ukraine. The newspaper "New Romania" was founded and headed by Onisifor Ghibu, in which have been published many articles signed by Elena Alistar. In 1927, she established in Bessarabia the Romanian Women Group. She became famous for her activity for the Romanian Women Orthodox Society which operates under the patronage of Mrs. Alexandrina Cantacuzino. After the Soviet occupation of Bessarabia and Northern Bukovina of 28 June 1940, she fled to Romania. After a short stay in Iași, she was arrested by the Communist regime and sent to the town of Pucioasa, then in Ploiești Region and now in Dâmbovița County, where she died in 1955. Years later, she was reburied at the Bellu Cemetery in Bucharest.

== Works ==
- Elena Alistar – Mișcarea feministă din Basarabia. Începuturi și realizări. Spre un viitor mai frumos. In: Mișcarea Feministă. 1. Nr. 1 (1933): 2.

== Bibliography ==
- Gheorghe E. Cojocaru, Sfatul Țării: itinerar, Civitas, Chişinău, 1998, ISBN 9975-936-20-2
- Mihai Taşcă, Sfatul Țării şi actualele autorităţi locale, "Timpul de dimineaţă", no. 114 (849), 27 June 2008 (page 16)
- Alexandru Chiriac. Membrii Sfatului Ţării. 1917–1918. Dicţionar, Editura Fundaţiei Culturale Române, București, 2001.
