= Karakurt, Ukraine =

Village in Odesa Oblast, Ukraine

Karakurt Каракурт
- Village
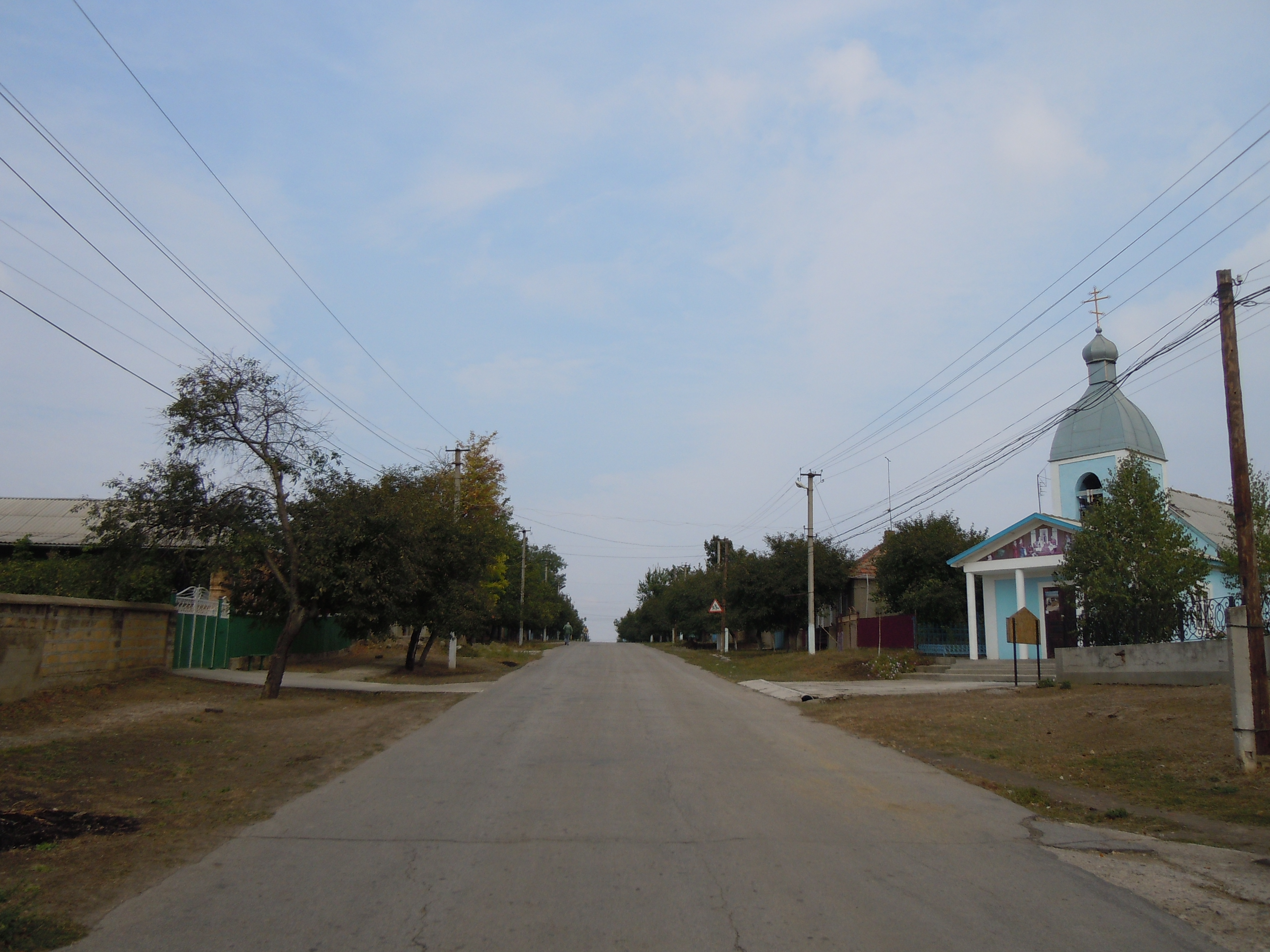

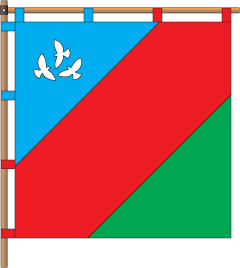
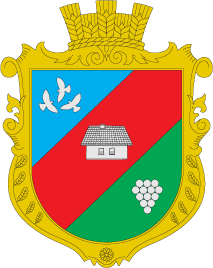
- Flag Coat of arms

- Location within Ukraine Location within Odesa Oblast
- Coordinates: 45°38′1″N 28°42′18″E
- Country: Ukraine
- Oblast: Odesa Oblast
- Raion: Bolhrad Raion
- Hromada: Vasylivka rural hromada
- Founded: 1811

Area
  - Total: 2.97 km^{2} (1.15 sq mi)
- Elevation: 24 m (79 ft)

Population (2021)
  - Total: 2,405
  - Density: 911/km^{2} (2,360/sq mi)
- Postal code: 68751
- Area code: +380 4846

Karakurt (Ukrainian: Каракурт; Russian: Каракурт; Albanian: Karakurt, also known as Karakurti; Romanian: Caracurt) is a village located in the Bolhrad Raion in the southwestern part of the Ukrainian Odesa Oblast with a population of approximately 2405 inhabitants (as of 2021).

== History ==
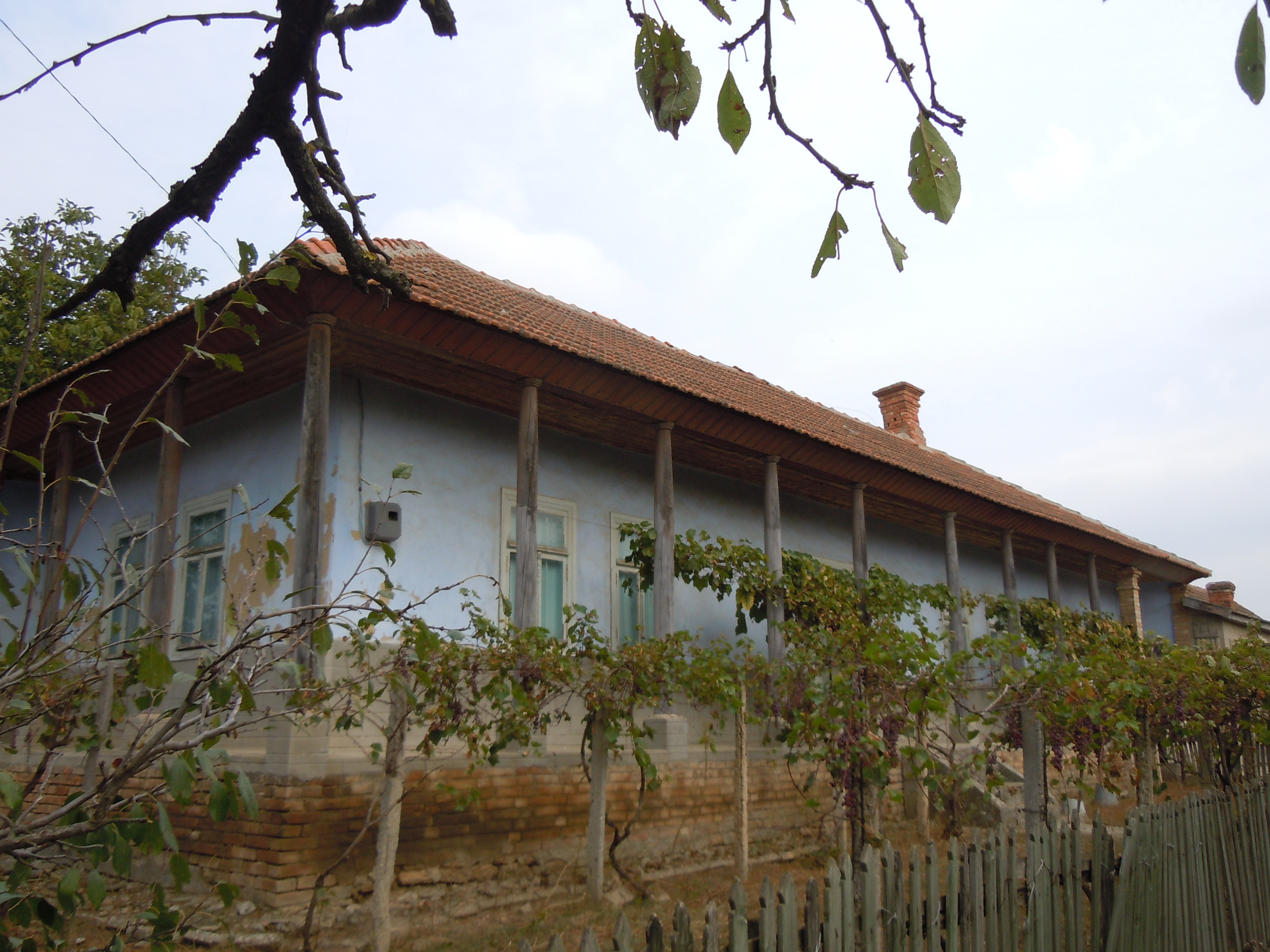
Typical Albanian house in the village

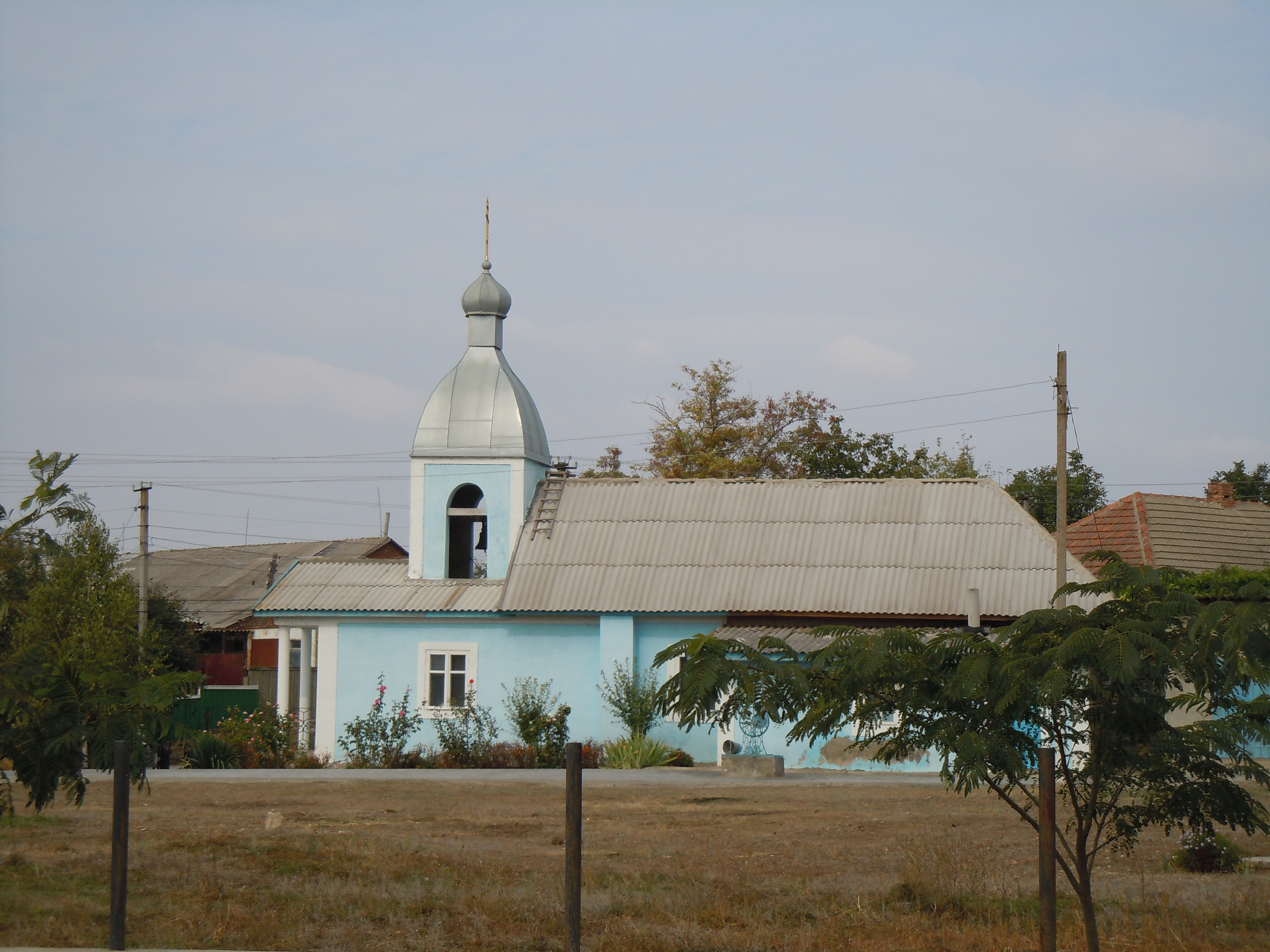
Village church

Karakurt was founded in 1811 by Albanians from Dobruja in the Bessarabia Governorate of the Russian Empire. After losing the Crimean War, the area including Cahul, Bolhrad, and Izmail, where Karakurt is located, was transferred to the Principality of Moldavia as Southern Bessarabia in 1856, only to fall back to the Russian Empire after the Russo-Ottoman War in 1878, a part of which it remained until 1917. During the chaos of the October Revolution, Russia lost Bessarabia, which declared itself independent as the Moldavian Democratic Republic in 1917 and voluntarily joined the Kingdom of Romania in the same year. After the Soviet Union re-occupied Bessarabia in 1940, Karakurt was transferred to the Bolhrad Raion of the Akkerman Oblast (renamed the Izmail Oblast on August 7, 1940) in the Ukrainian SSR. At the beginning of the German-Soviet War, the village returned to Romania in 1941. After the Red Army recaptured Bessarabia in 1944, the village was renamed to Zhovtneve (Жовтневе) on November 14, 1945, and joined once again the Ukrainian Oblast of Izmail, which became part of the Odesa Oblast in 1954. In 1991, the village became part of independent Ukraine. On May 12, 2016, the village regained its original name due to decommunization in Ukraine.

Even today, Albanian is the predominant language spoken in Karakurt. In 2013, the inhabitants of the village consisted of approximately 60% Albanians, 25% Bulgarians, 10% Gagauz and 5% representatives of other ethnic groups.

== Geography ==
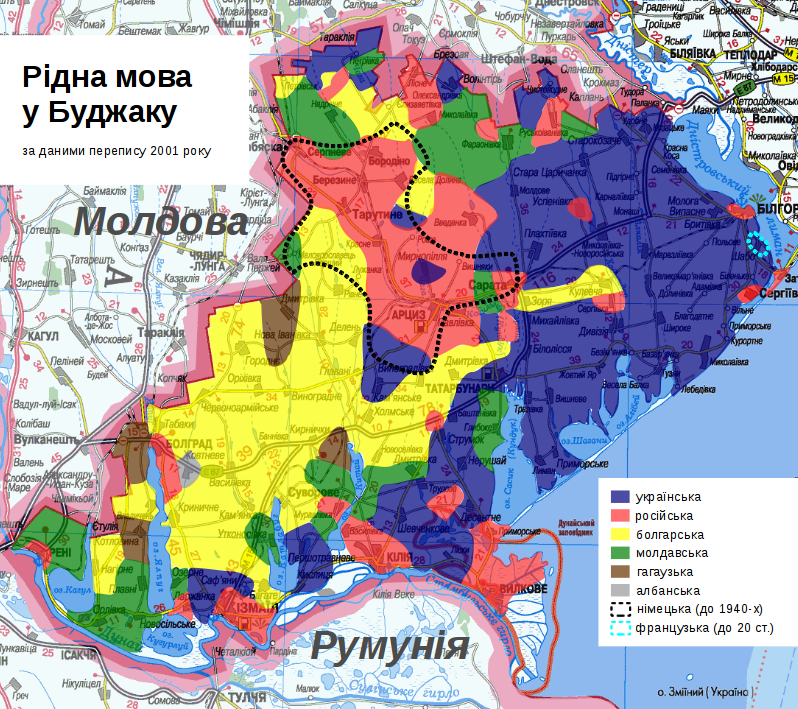
Predominant languages in Budjak in 2001. Albanian is spoken in the gray area around Karakurt.

The village is situated on the bank of the Karasulak, a 21 km long tributary of Lake Yalpuh, 9 km southeast of the rayon center Bolhrad and about 220 km southwest of the oblast center Odesa. The territorial road T-16-06 runs through the village.

== Administration ==
On June 12, 2020, the village became a part of the rural municipality of Vasylivka; until then, together with the village of Novyi Karakurt (Новий Каракурт), it formed the rural municipality of Karakurt (Ukrainian: Каракуртська сільська рада) in the south of Bolhrad Raion.
