= Albania–Ukraine relations =

- Albania: Ukraine

The diplomatic relations between Albania and Ukraine were established in 1993. In September 2020, Ukraine opened an embassy in Tirana. Albania is accredited to Ukraine from its embassy in Warsaw, Poland and has an honorary consulate in Kharkiv. Both countries are members of the BSCE, OSCE, and Council of Europe. Albania is member of NATO, for which Ukraine applied for membership in 2022.

== History ==
=== Early contacts ===
During a visit to the Soviet Union, Albanian leader Enver Hoxha visited Kyiv on his way to Moscow.

=== Post–Cold War and new relations ===
Albania recognized the independence of Ukraine on January 4, 1992. Diplomatic relations between the two countries were established on January 13, 1993.

The Embassy of Ukraine in Albania has been operating since September 1, 2020.

In early 2023, Albanian Foreign Minister Olta Xhacka announced that Albania plans to open its embassy in Ukraine. On July 2, 2020, Albania handed over a diplomatic note on opening of a diplomatic mission of Albania in Ukraine. In September 2021, a new Head of the Albanian diplomatic mission in Ukraine, Adhurim Resuli, was appointed.

=== Opposition to Russian activity ===
==== Annexation of Crimea and War in Donbas ====
Albania opposed the 2014 annexation of Crimea by Russia and its moves to destabilise eastern areas of Ukraine. Albanian authorities stated the West needed to respond in a firm and unitary manner toward Russian actions in Ukraine.

In March 2014, Albania voted in favour of the United Nations General Assembly Resolution 68/262 which affirmed the General Assembly's commitment to the territorial integrity of Ukraine within its internationally recognized borders and underscored the invalidity of the 2014 Crimean referendum.

==== 2022 invasion of Ukraine ====
As Russian military actions in Ukraine commenced, Albanian President Ilir Meta, Prime Minister Edi Rama, Minister for Europe and Foreign Affairs Olta Xhaçka, and Ambassador to the UN Ferit Hoxha made statements condemning the Russian invasion of Ukraine. After a NATO summit, Rama said that Albania would be ready to welcome a few thousand Ukrainian refugees fleeing the war. Albania opposed Russia's recognition of the separatist regions in Ukraine's Donbas as independent and considered it a violation of international law, the Minsk Protocol and Ukrainian sovereignty.

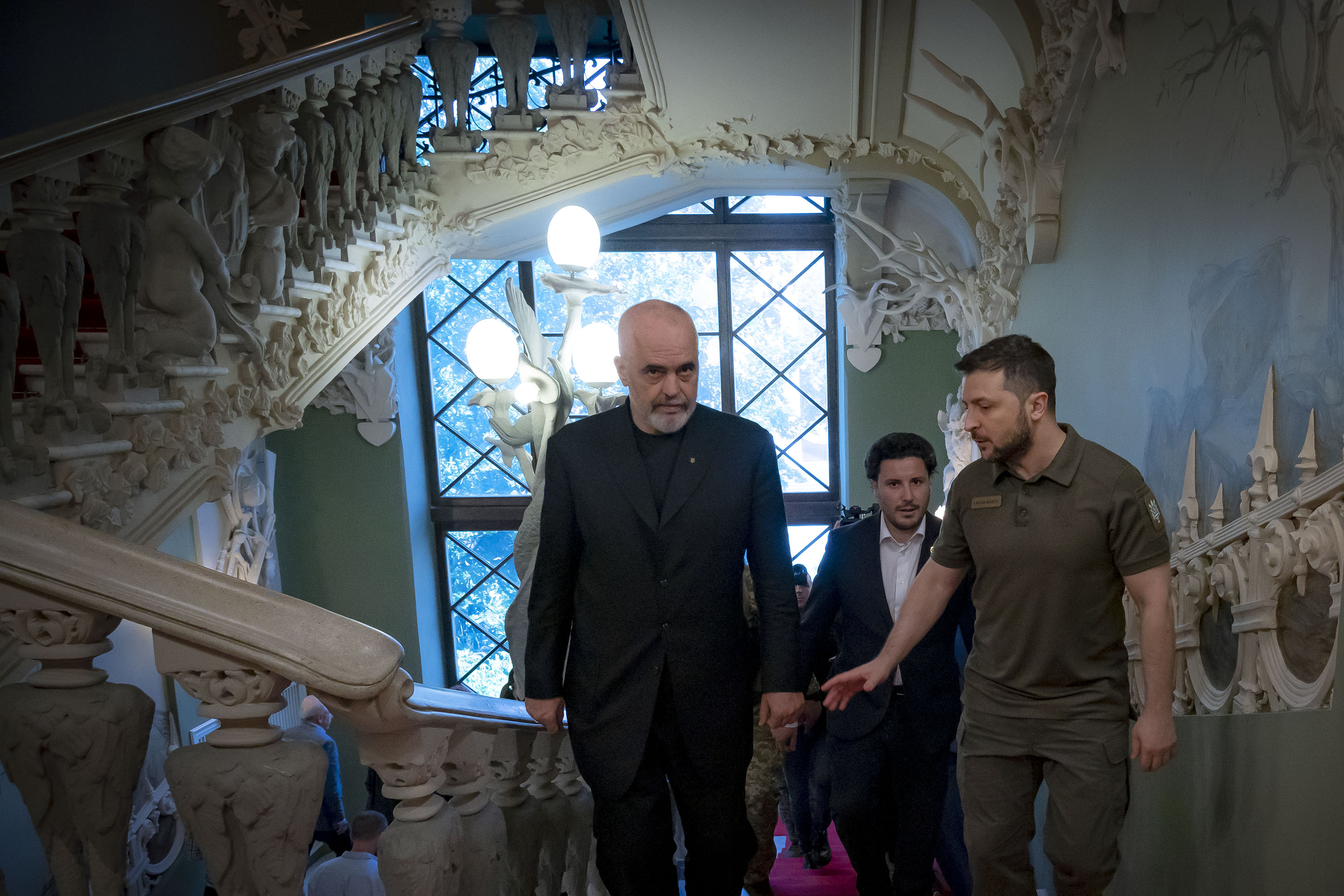
Prime Minister of Albania Edi Rama and President of Ukraine Zelenskyy during the visit of Western Balkans leaders in Kyiv.

In late February 2022, Albania and the US tabled a co-written resolution condemning the Russian invasion of Ukraine at the 15 member UN Security Council, but failed to pass as Russia vetoed it. At the UN Security Council, Albania cosponsored a resolution with the US for an emergency General Assembly session to be held regarding the invasion of Ukraine. As it was a procedural vote, Russia's opposition did not affect the outcome and the resolution passed. In a phone call with Prime minister Rama, Ukrainian President Volodymyr Zelenskyy thanked Albania's efforts and assistance to Ukraine.

The name of a Tirana street where the Russian embassy is located was changed to "Free Ukraine" by Mayor Erion Veliaj. In early March, Albania's honorary consulate in Kharkiv was shelled and destroyed by Russian forces, there were no casualties as its staff had evacuated the building. A resolution was passed by the Albanian parliament supporting Ukraine and its borders. Albania delivered military equipment to Ukraine for its combat operations opposing Russia.

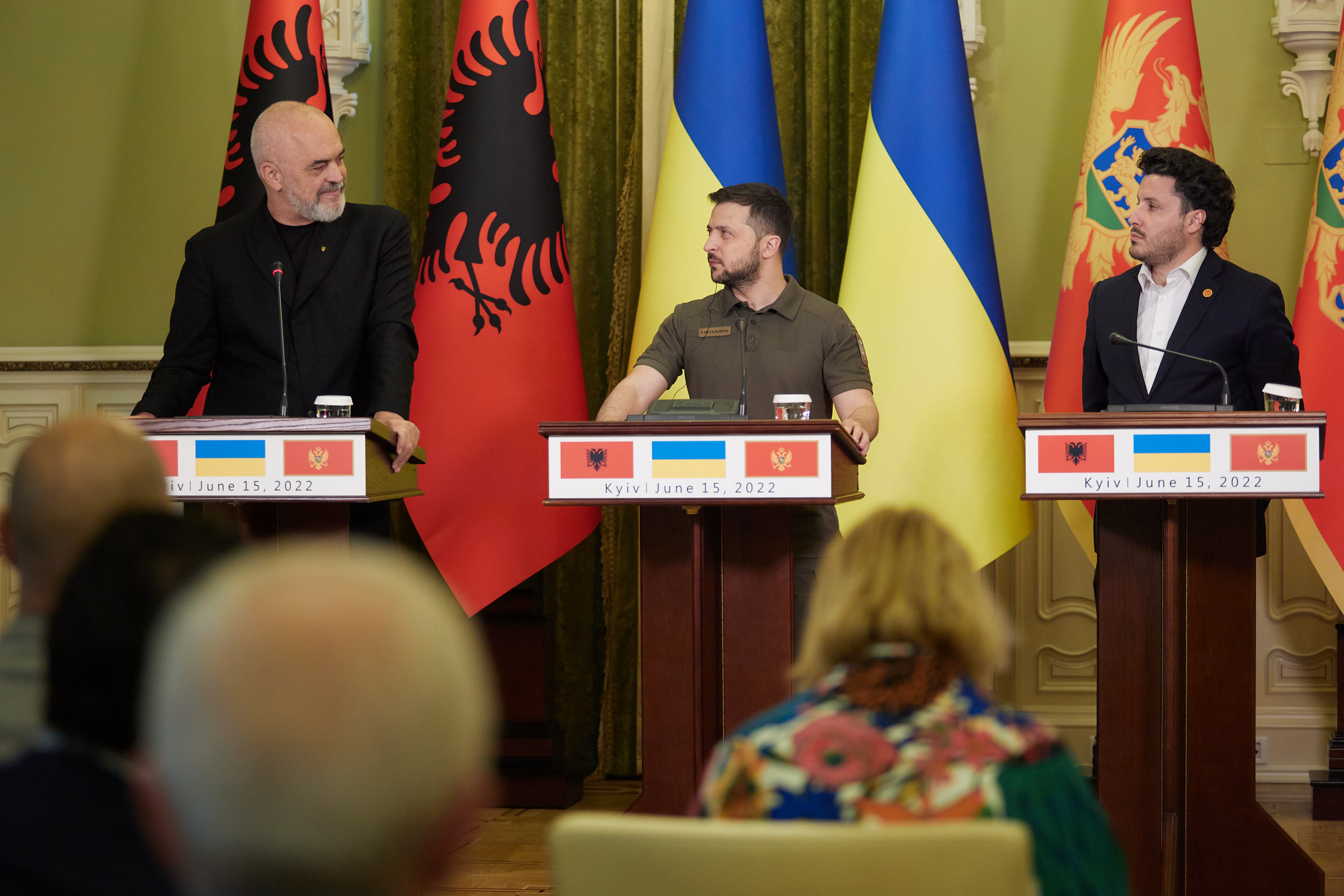
Meeting of the President of Ukraine with the Prime Ministers of Albania, Montenegro and North Macedonia

In mid-March, Albania received 351 Ukrainian refugees with the government offering to house several thousand other Ukrainians. Albania has allowed any Ukrainians entering the country to remain without visas and a resident's permit for up to a year.

In the years following the invasion, Albania kept reiterating its support for Ukraine in its fight to defend its territorial integrity and sovereignty. In 2024, the President of Albania Bajram Begaj considered Ukrainian people and government as 'the everyday heroes of resistance in the name of sovereignty and human dignity'.

In February 2024 Ukrainian President Volodymyr Zelenskyy visited Tirana, where he attended a summit of southeastern European countries. During his visit, he presented his vision of peace in Ukraine and promoted the idea of joint arms production with Albania. A joint declaration signed by 10 countries at the summit said their leaders were ready to take part in a Ukrainian-led peace summit in Switzerland in the spring of 2024 to discuss Zelenskyy's vision of peace.

== Resident diplomatic missions ==
- Albania has an embassy in Kyiv.
- Ukraine has an embassy in Tirana.

== See also ==
- Foreign relations of Albania
- Foreign relations of Ukraine
- Ukraine-NATO relations
- Accession of Albania to the EU
- Accession of Ukraine to the EU
- Albanians in Ukraine
- Ukrainians in Albania
