= Vasylivka, Bolhrad Raion, Odesa Oblast =

Vasylivka Vaisal Vaisal
- Village
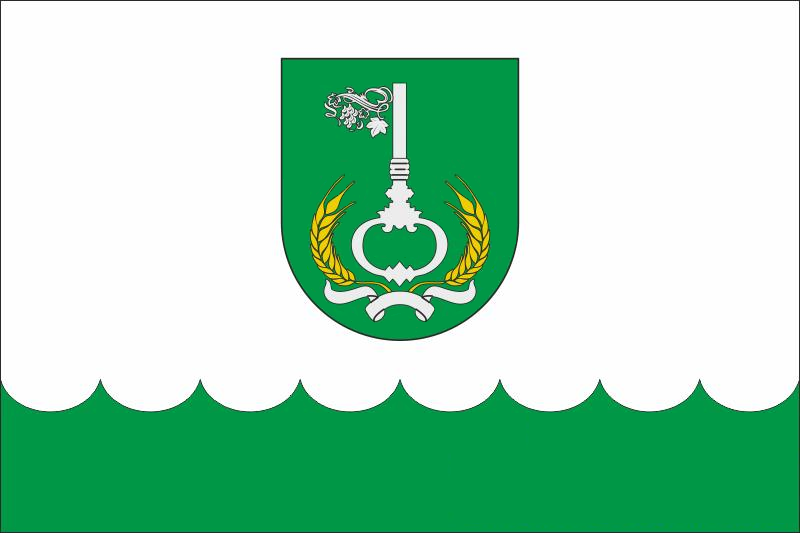
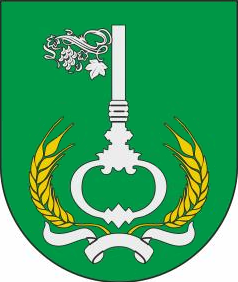
- Flag Coat of arms
- Interactive map of Vasylivka
- Location in Odesa Oblast Location in Ukraine
- Coordinates: 45°38′N 28°49′E
- Country: Ukraine
- Oblast: Odesa Oblast
- Raion: Bolhrad Raion
- Hromada: Vasylivka rural hromada
- Time zone: UTC+2 (EET)
  - Summer (DST): UTC+3 (EEST)

Vasylivka (Ukrainian: Василівка; Romanian: Vaisal) is a village in Bolhrad Raion, Odesa Oblast, Ukraine. It hosts the administration of Vasylivka rural hromada, one of the hromadas of Ukraine.

== History ==
The village was built c. 1830s by Bulgarian refugees that came from a village named Vaisal (Odrinsko) & Stara Planina.

At first this was not in Ukraine but it was called Besarabia and was part of Romania until 1879. In 1861–1862, there were 1568 refugees that came from Bulgaria.

== Notable people ==
- Elena Alistar
