= Vasylivka rural hromada =

Coordinates: 45°38′N 28°50′E

Vasylivka rural hromada Василівська сільська громада
- Hromada
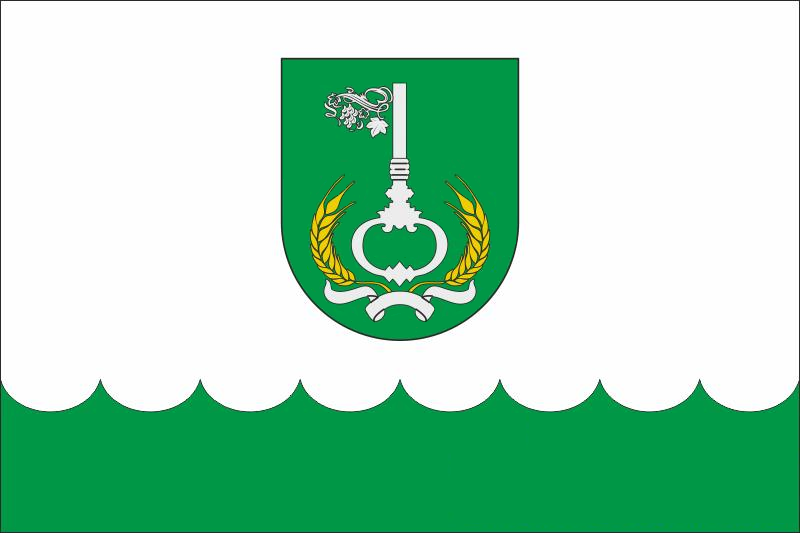
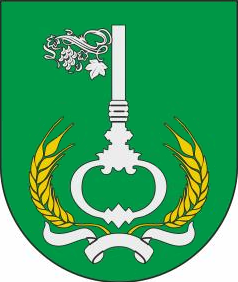
- Flag Coat of arms
- Interactive map of Vasylivka rural hromada
- Country: Ukraine
- Oblast: Odesa Oblast
- Raion: Bolhrad Raion
- Admin. center: Vasylivka

Area
  - Total: 252.6 km^{2} (97.5 sq mi)

Population (2020)
  - Total: 2,820
  - Density: 11.2/km^{2} (28.9/sq mi)
- CATOTTG code: UA51060070000052726
- Settlements: 6
- Villages: 6

Vasylivka rural hromada (Ukrainian: Василівська сільська громада) is a hromada in Bolhrad Raion of Odesa Oblast in southwestern Ukraine. Population: 2,820 (2020 est.)

The hromada consists of 6 villages:

- Bannivka
- Vasylivka (seat of administration)
- Holytsia
- Kalcheva
- Karakurt
- Novyi Karakurt

== Links ==
- Василівська сільська громада
