= Zîrnești =

- Commune
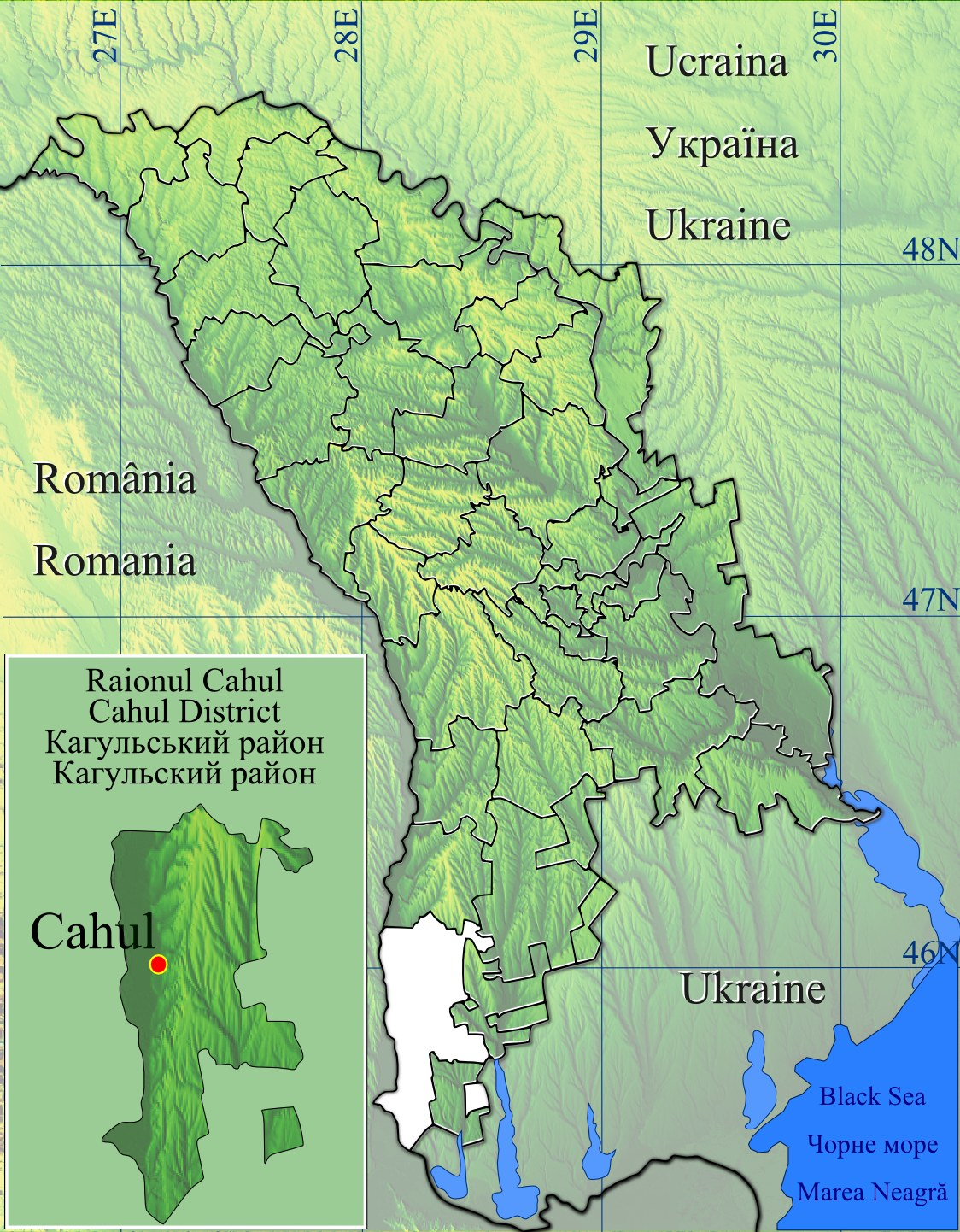
- Location within Cahul
- Coordinates: 46°00′49″N 28°10′10″E
- Country: Moldova
- District: Cahul District

Population (2014)
  - Total: 2,203
- Time zone: UTC+2 (EET)
  - Summer (DST): UTC+3 (EEST)
- Postal code: MD-3933

Zîrnești is a commune in Cahul District, Moldova. It is composed of three villages: Paicu, Tretești and Zîrnești.
