= Lengipromez =

Russian engineering company

OJSC “Lengipromez”
- Type: Public (OAO)
- Industry: metallurgical and mining engineering plants
- Predecessor: the Leningrad State Institute for Designing Iron and Steel Plants
- Founded: 1926
- Founder: The Soviet Government
- Headquarters: Saint-Petersburg, Russia
- Number of locations: 151, Leninsky Prospekt (near the Constitution Sq.), Saint Petersburg, Russia
- Key people: Vladimir N. Krivoshapov, General Director
- Products: projects
- Services: projects, project Evaluation
- Website: www.lengipromez.ru/en

Lengipromez (Russian: Открытое акционерное общество «Ленгипромез») is a Russian engineering company.

The Open Joint-Stock Company “Lengipromez” is a legal successor of the Leningrad State Institute for Designing Iron and Steel Plants (Lengipromez) constituted by a Decree of the Government in 1926.

In 2003 the Institute has been granted the TϋV CERT Certificate for compliance with the DIN EN ISO 9001-2000 requirements.

== List of the Engineering and Consulting Services Rendered by “Lengipromez” ==
- Severstal, Ironmaking Plant
- Uralskaya Stal, Electric Furnace Shop
- Magnitogorsk Iron and Steel Works, 1929-1934

== Services ==
Lengipromez prepares designs of the units included into the makeup of a metallurgical complex as well as of the allied units and facilities:

- Mechanical – repair shops and foundries;
- Metallurgical departments at machine – building plants;
- Nature conservation projects;
- Utilities facilities with implementation of the advanced energy- saving technologies;
- Infrastructure units.

== Staff ==
The average number of employees of the organization is 43.

=== Directors ===
CEO - Krivoshapov Vladimir Nikolaevich

== Financial indicators ==
The amount of the authorized capital of Lengipromez is 1,177,400.00 rubles.

For 2023 the company's profit is 25,228,000 rubles, and revenue for 2023 is 103,149,000 rubles.

== Awards ==
- Order of the Red Banner of Labour, 1976
- Jubilee Medal "50 Years of the Armed Forces of the USSR"
- the Red Banner of the Ministry of Ferrous Metallurgy of the USSR etc.
