= Roșu, Cahul =

Roșu
- Village
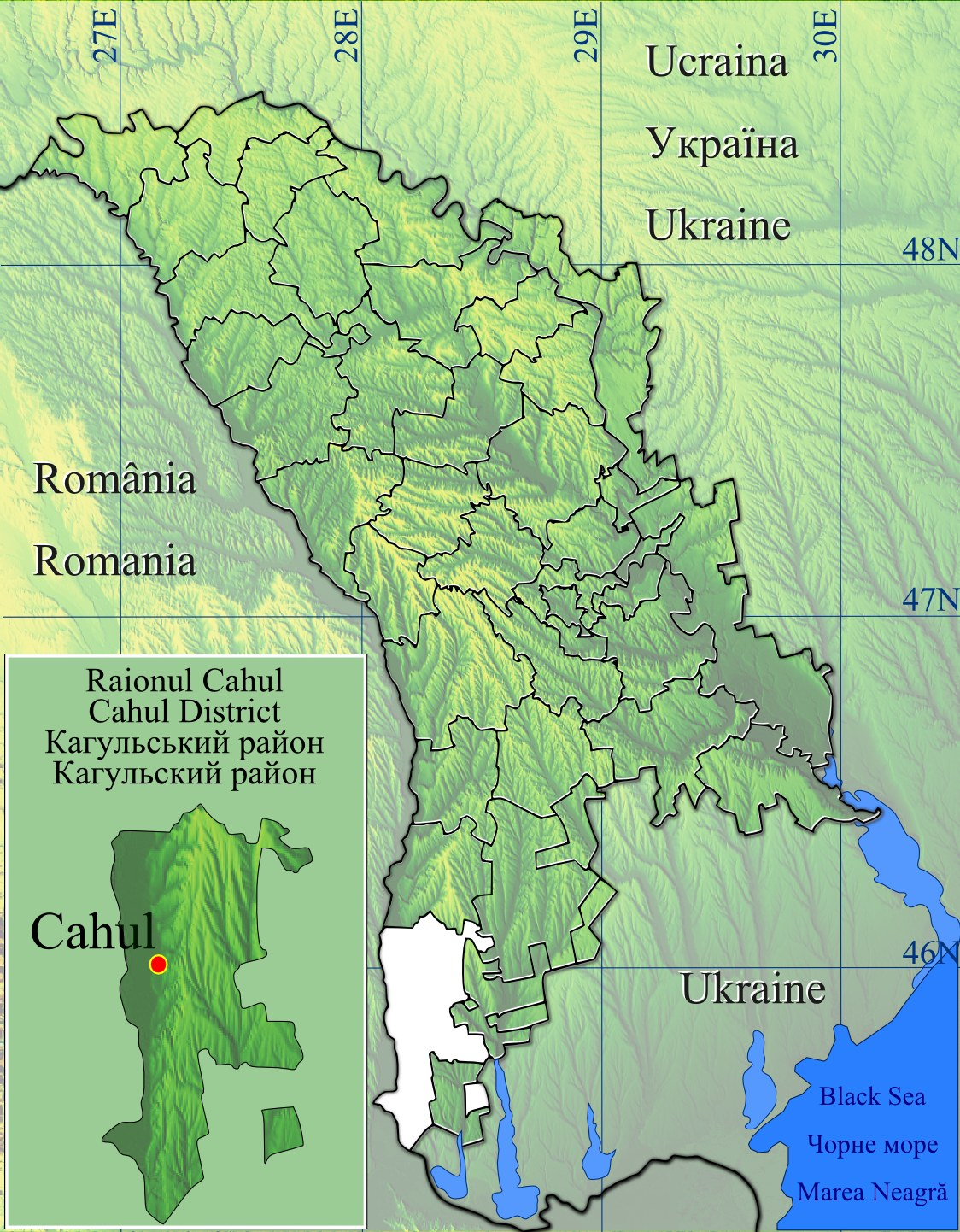
- Location within Cahul
- Coordinates: 45°57′15″N 28°11′54″E
- Country: Moldova

Government
  - Mayor: Savilencu Nicolae (PLDM)

Population (2014 census)
  - Total: 3,132
- Time zone: UTC+2 (EET)
  - Summer (DST): UTC+3 (EEST)
- Postal code: MD-3928

Roșu is a village in Cahul District, Moldova.
