= Union for repatriation of Russians abroad =

Unions for repatriation of Russians abroad were Soviet front organizations aimed at infiltration and control of the exiled community of White Russians. Unions for repatriations were created in the United States, France and Bulgaria among Russian emigrants after the publication of decrees by the CPSU Central Committee in 1921 and 1924. The decrees declared amnesty to members of the White movement. The Unions had helped to convince thousands of emigrants to return.

During the period from 1921 to 1931, more than 300,000 people had returned. The fate of the returnees, with few exceptions was tragic: the former military officers were shot upon arrival, and former soldiers were sent to Gulags. Some of the deceived returnees appealed to Russian immigrants not to believe the Bolshevik's assurances and seek protection from Commissioner for Refugees under the League of Nations, Fridtjof Nansen. This led to creation of Nansen passport, which was recognized by 31 states, where more than 25,000 Russians have settled.

Many Soviet spies had connections with Unions for repatriation. One of notable examples was assassination unit which included Nikolai Vasilyevich Skoblin, his wife Nadezhda Plevitskaya, Max Eitingon and Sergei Efron. They took part in murder of Ignace Reiss, the disappearance of General Yevgeny Miller, and probable murder of Lev Sedov, son of Leon Trotsky.

== See also ==
- Communist front
- Soviet Peace Committee
- East/West
- Repatriation of Cossacks after World War II
- Against Their Will (book)
