= Nadejda Grinfeld =

Bessarabian politician (1887–1918)

Nadejda Evgenevna Grinfeld (1887–1918) was a Bessarabian politician who served in the Parliament of Moldova in 1917 and 1918.

== Biography ==
Nadejda Grinfeld served as Member of the Moldovan Parliament in 1917 and 1918. Sfatul Țării included only two women, Elena Alistar being the other woman member of Sfatul Țării.

Nadezhda Evgenevna Grinfeld had joined the Bund in Chişinău in 1903 and except for short periods in prison and emigration was continuously active in Menshevik organizations in Odessa, Kiev, and Saint Petersburg. Grinfeld, had already established a reputation as a Bundist speaker in the prerevolutionary period, was the head of a Bundist self-defense group in Odessa during 1905 Russian Revolution. During 1917, she was a popular speaker at mass meetings in Petrograd and Kronstadt. Elected as a Menshevik representative in the regional assembly of Bessarabia, Sfatul Țării, she supported Bessarabian autonomy in order to counter the influence of the newly-established Bolshevik government in Russia. As the Sfatul Țării was losing authority over the region and faced an ever increasing influence of the Bolsheviks by early January 1918, the various factions looked out for outside help. Grinfeld, speaking for the Socialist Bloc in the assembly, while acknowledging to the objectives of the local government, protested against the introduction of Romanian troops, warning the government had no way to prevent a permanent occupation. She further requested Ukrainian troops be called in to restore order and suggested sending a Moldovan delegation to the Brest-Litovsk conference, insisting that only the All-Russian Constituent Assembly has the right to ratify a peace treaty. The Romanian Army did eventually intervene in Bessarabia with the collaboration of the nationalist faction in the Sfatul Țării, and Grinfeld was among the MPs executed by the Romanians for opposing their occupation or control. Engineer and amateur historian (including literary historian) Iurie Colesnic claimed in his 1998 book Sfatul Tarii: Enciclopedie that the "Romanian authorities expelled her over the Dniester in the month of January 1918".

== Notes ==
- Levit, Izeaslav (2000). Год судьбоносный : от провозглашения Молдавской республики до ликвидации автономии Бессарабии : (ноябрь 1917 - ноябрь 1918 г.) [The fateful year: from the proclamation of the Moldavian Republic to the abolition of the Bessarabian autonomy: (November 1917 – November 1918)] (in Russian). Chișinău: Tipografia Centrală. ISBN 9975-78-057-1.
- Șornikov, Petru (2011). Бессарабский фронт (1918–1940) [The Bessarabian front (1918-1940)] (in Russian) (2nd ed.). Tiraspol: Taras Shevchenko Transnistria State University.
- Țurcanu, Ion (2018). Sfatul Țării. Istoria instituției politice basarabene din anii 1917-1918. Chișinău: Editura ARC. ISBN 978-9975-0-0124-3.

== Bibliography ==
- Colesnic, Iurie, Sfatul Tarii: Enciclopedie (Chisinau: Editura Museum 1998)
- Gheorghe E. Cojocaru, Sfatul Țării: itinerar, Civitas, Chişinău, 1998, ISBN 9975-936-20-2
- Mihai Taşcă, Sfatul Țării şi actualele autorităţi locale, "Timpul de dimineaţă", no. 114 (849), June 27, 2008 (page 16)
- Leopold H. Haimson, Ziva Galili y Garcia, Richard Wortman, The making of three Russian revolutionaries: voices from the Menshevik past, 1987.
