= Immigration to Ukraine =

Immigration into Ukraine post independence has been mainly ethnic Ukrainians returning from neighboring countries (for example in 1993, they made up about 90% of all immigrants). Other significant immigrant groups included Crimean Tatars and people fleeing wars in Azerbaijan, Transnistria and Ichkeria (now part of Russia as the Chechen Republic). In January 2017, there were 3,302 foreigners with refugee status in Ukraine. Most refugees came from Afghanistan, Syria, Armenia, Azerbaijan, Russia and Somalia.

After the start of the war in Donbas in 2014, several hundred foreigners (mostly Russians and Belarusians) migrated to Ukraine to join its territorial defence battalions and army. Since the Russian Invasion of Ukraine began in February 2022, far fewer immigrants have been moving to Ukraine.

== Countries of origin ==
Rank	Country of Birth	Population (2001)	% of Ukraine's population
	Total	5,156,240	10.7
1	Russia	3,613,240	7.5
2	Belarus	270,751	0.6
3	Kazakhstan	245,072	0.5
4	Uzbekistan	242,390	0.5
5	Moldova	165,126	0.3
6	Poland	145,106	0.3
7	Azerbaijan	90,753	0.2
8	Georgia	71,015	0.1
9	Germany	64,015	0.1
10	Armenia	52,168	0.1
11	Tajikistan	32,386	0.1
12	Kyrgyzstan	29,476	0.1
13	Turkmenistan	24,926	0.1
14	Latvia	19,095	0.0
15	Lithuania	16,012	0.0
16	Hungary	11,235	0.0
17	Estonia	10,964	0.0
18	Czech Republic	7,473	0.0
19	China	5,015	0.0
20	Mongolia	4,413	0.0
21	Romania	3,876	0.0
22	Vietnam	3,399	0.0
23	Slovakia	2,148	0.0
24	Bulgaria	2,062	0.0
25	Austria	1,726	0.0
26	France	1,433	0.0
27	Syria	1,352	0.0
28	India	1,232	0.0
29	Afghanistan	1,111	0.0
30	United States	1,040	0.0

== Statistics ==
Number of foreigners and stateless persons
Country	2017	2018	2019	2020
Russia	155,310	161,131	165,530	169,892
Moldova	20,037	21,847	23,764	25,144
Azerbaijan	17,009	17,576	19,445	21,287
India	11,313	15,865	19,295	19,825
Georgia	12,856	13,242	13,918	14,802
Turkey	6,999	9,480	12,322	14,623
Armenia	12,671	13,159	13,649	14,315
Belarus	10,663	11,300	12,275	14,201
Uzbekistan	9,430	9,678	10,566	11,251
China	4,996	6,147	8,426	9,350
Morocco	5,588	7,202	8,515	8,900
Vietnam	7,207	7,022	7,111	7,293
Turkmenistan	4,755	5,501	6,620	6,936
Nigeria	3,909	4,450	5,841	6,647
Stateless	5,514	5,650	5,642	5,851
Israel	3,896	4,599	5,128	5,611
Iran	2,847	4,157	4,876	5,475
USA	3,001	3,489	4,450	5,373
Egypt	3,574	4,285	5,049	5,308
Iraq	3,925	4,166	4,703	5,127
Kazakhstan	3,746	3,948	4,238	4,552
Syria	3,161	3,396	3,593	3,899
Poland	2,730	3,058	3,362	3,572
Jordan	3,432	3,728	3,577	3,420
Lebanon	2,043	2,355	2,628	2,802
Germany	1,548	1,791	2,176	2,612
Algeria	884	1,274	2,015	2,603
Tajikistan	1,745	1,778	1,893	2,100
Lithuania	1,608	1,705	1,828	1,998
Italy	1,276	1,446	1,752	1,971
Libya	1,140	1,328	1,702	1,962
Afghanistan	1,201	1,270	1,531	1,682
United Kingdom	754	879	1,287	1,673
Pakistan	993	1,102	1,319	1,621
Ghana	1,435	1,789	1,727	1,565
France	673	819	1,060	1,394
Tunisia	1,019	1,169	1,247	1,361
Latvia	1,036	1,132	1,200	1,323
Kyrgyzstan	1,005	1,058	1,172	1,268
Romania	617	725	942	1,029
Total	353,341	383,711	417,936	444,964

Net number of interstate migrants by region of arrival/departure, citizens of Ukraine excluded
Region	2010	2011	2012	2013	2014	2015	2016	2017	2018	2019	2020	2021
Asia	4,998	4,974	34,178	13,811	8,397	4,088	4,897	5,172	12,304	15,959	3,866	11,410
Europe	10,724	11,535	17,920	14,593	14,006	10,252	3,887	4,846	5,501	5,745	3,987	5,524
Africa	237	168	7,647	3,269	2,105	1,963	1,934	2,121	4,444	4,577	1,580	4,635
Americas	238	253	326	691	149	414	211	326	386	693	-14	762
Oceania	15	13	24	24	-5	14	4	17	9	30	15	30
Total	16,212	16,943	61,217	22,388	24,652	16,731	10,933	12,482	22,644	27,004	9,434	22,361

== 2026 рік ==
According to the State Employment Service, as of May 2026, there were 9,503 foreign workers officially employed in Ukraine, all of whom were in the country based on work permits.
