= Violations of non-combatant airspace during the Russo-Ukrainian war (2022–present) =

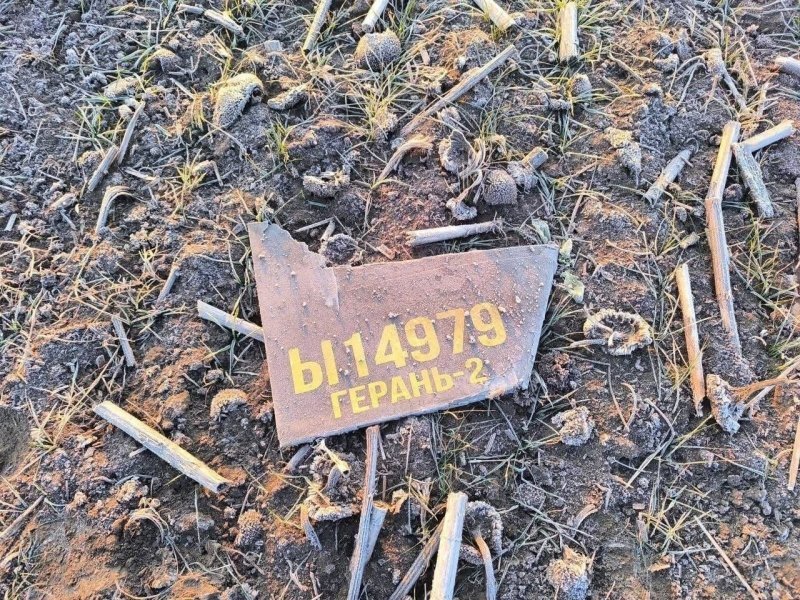
Wreckage of a Russian Geran-2 drone found near Ceadîr-Lunga, Moldova on February 13, 2025. Geran-2 drones have been frequently involved in airspace violations from 2025 onwards.

Following the escalation of the Russo-Ukrainian war, with Russia's full-scale invasion of Ukraine on February 24, 2022, states in the vicinity of the conflict reported numerous violations of their airspace, particularly NATO member states that Russia had designated as "unfriendly states" because of their political, military and economic support for Ukraine. While most violations were attributed to Russian (or Belarusian) military equipment such as UAVs and aircraft, Ukrainian equipment was also responsible on several occasions, most notably in the 2022 Przewodów explosion, in which two Polish civilians were killed by a stray Ukrainian rocket that hit a farm in Przewodów, eight kilometres into Poland and NATO territory.

The incidents involved a wide range of military equipment, including cruise or ballistic missiles, drones, helicopters and military airplanes. While many violations were assessed as accidental, resulting from electronic warfare or navigation errors, several defense analysts and military experts suggested that some incursions may have been deliberate, in order to provoke NATO or increase political and military pressure on member states supporting Ukraine. No conclusive evidence has emerged in this sense, although the possibility has been discussed.

== Frequency and reactions ==
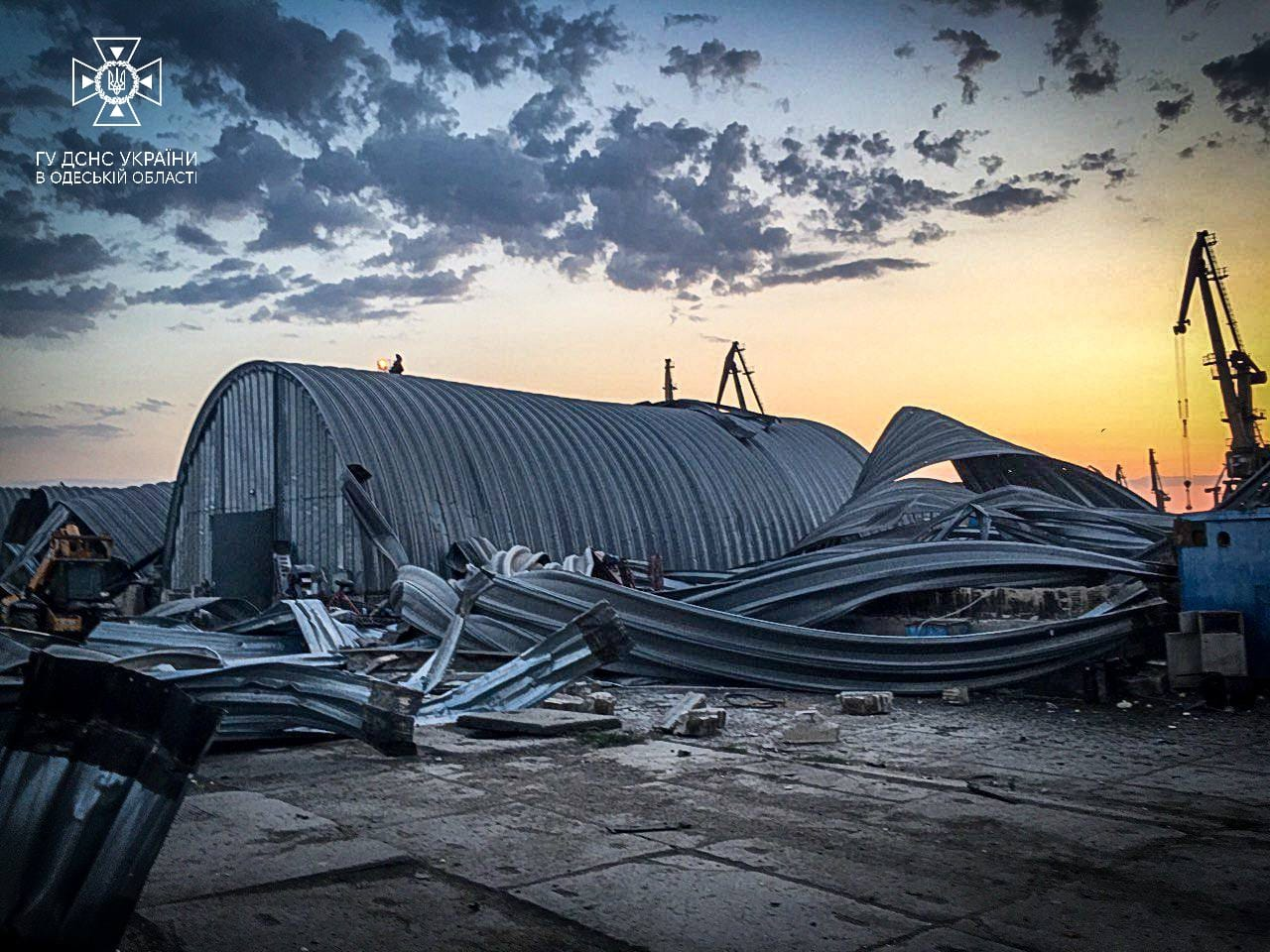
Aftermath of a Russian missile strike on the Ukrainian port of Reni on August 16, 2023. Due to the port's proximity to the Romanian border, the repeated Russian attacks on Reni often resulted in violations of Romanian airspace and the discovery of drone wreckage on Romanian territory.

A significant number of the violations occurred in sparsely populated regions. Hotspots include Romania's Danube Delta, where the proximity of Ukrainian ports targeted by Russian strikes often resulted in drone- or missile wreckage crossing the border, and the heavily forested borders of Poland and the Baltic states with Belarus and Russia. In several cases, wreckage was accidentally discovered only days or weeks later by civilians or border patrols.

Romania has experienced the highest number of reported incidents since 2023, with at least 70 violations involving both Russian and Ukrainian military equipment. The incidents ranged from repeated discovery of drone fragments to complete drone crashes and explosions near or in inhabited areas. The most serious was the crash of a Russian drone into an apartment building in Galați, the eighth largest city of Romania, which injured two civilians and caused significant material damage. Similar incidents have occurred in other neighboring states, including the aforementioned November 2022 missile explosion in Poland and the March 2022 crash of a military drone in Zagreb, which crossed the airspace of Romania and Hungary before crashing in the Croatian capital.

The violations prompted governments of the affected countries repeatedly condemned the incidents and called on Russia to respect international borders, while also prompted NATO to expand its air policing and integrated air and missile defense activities in Eastern Europe. Although most violations did not result in casualties or material damage, they highlighted the risks posed by military operations conducted in close proximity to NATO territory and raised concerns about the potential for accidental escalation between Russia and the bloc.

== List of violations ==
=== 2022 ===
Date	Non‑combatant country	Committed by	Nature of violation
February 24, 2022	Romania	Ukraine	On the starting day of the invasion, a Ukrainian Air Force Sukhoi Su-27 fighter suffered some technical problems which resulted in the loss of communication with its home base. The fighter accidentally entered Romanian airspace and was intercepted by two Romanian F-16 fighters which escorted it to the 95th Air Base in Bacău. After its technical problems were fixed, the Ukrainian aircraft was returned without its armament on March 1, being escorted by two MiG-21 LanceRs to the border where other Ukrainian aircraft took over.
March 2, 2022	Sweden	Russia	Four Russian Su-24s and Su-27s violated the airspace of Sweden above the Baltic Sea east of Gotland. The Swedish Air Force, using a JAS 39 Gripen, photographed the event.
March 10, 2022	Croatia; Hungary; Romania	Undisclosed	2022 Zagreb Tu-141 crash: An unmanned drone, a Tupolev Tu-141, crashed in Zagreb, the capital city of Croatia, after travelling through Croatian, Hungarian and Romanian airspace. Both Ukraine and Russia denied ownership of the drone. Croatian Minister of Defense Mario Banožić said in an interview that the governments of Croatia and other NATO member states in the drone's flight path know who launched the drone, but the information had been declared a state secret.
March 13, 2022	Romania	Russia	A Russian Orlan-10 drone crashed in the Bistrița-Năsăud County. Initially thought to be a privately owned commercial drone, it was soon identified to be an Orlan-10 of the Russian army.
April 29, 2022	Sweden	Russia	A Russian Antonov An-30 violated the airspace of Sweden south of Blekinge in the Friday evening. The violation lasted for less than one minute.
November 15, 2022	Poland	Ukraine	2022 missile explosion in Poland: A Ukrainian S-300 air-defence missile became out of control and crashed into a grain facility in the village of Przewodów, Lublin Voivodeship, killing two people.
December 16, 2022	Poland	Russia	During a Russian missile attack on Ukraine, Polish radar detected an unidentified object in their airspace, but neither the United States F-15 or Polish MiG-29 fighter jets operating nearby were able to visually identify it before it disappeared from radar. On April 27, 2023, remains of a Kh-55 cruise missile were discovered by a horseback rider in a forest in Zamość, Kuyavian-Pomeranian Voivodeship, 15 km west of the city of Bydgoszcz (NATO Joint Force Training Centre headquarter) in northern Poland; according to the Polish Air Force Institute of Technology, the missile was likely fired by a Russian Su-34 during the December 16, 2022 attack on Ukraine but unintentionally veered off course, travelling through Belarusian airspace into Poland before crashing. The discovery provoked a political controversy in Poland regarding why the airspace violation had not been made public at the time, and why Polish air defence and radar systems had lost track of the missile.

=== 2023 ===
Date	Non‑combatant country	Committed by	Nature of violation
February 10, 2023	Moldova	Russia	A Russian missile violated Moldovan airspace, resulting in the Russian ambassador to Moldova being summoned in protest.
August 1, 2023	Poland	Belarus	Two Belarusian helicopters violated Polish airspace, with the Belarusian chargé d'affaires summoned by Poland in response.
September 4–9, 2023	Romania	Russia	A Russian drone fell on Romanian territory during the attacks on the night of September 3 to 4. The claims were initially denied, however, on September 5, drone fragments were identified near the village of Plauru on the Ukrainian border. Other drone fragments were discovered on September 9.
September 13, 2023	Romania	Russia	The crew of a Romanian Air Force helicopter identified fragments from a drone between the villages of Nufăru and Victoria, after a Russian attack on the Ukrainian port of Izmail. According to the locals, the drone fell about 1 kilometre (0.62 mi) away from a military unit located in the area.
September 30, 2023	Romania	Russia	A Russian drone was detected in Romanian airspace by the Romanian defence ministry during an overnight drone attack against Ukraine.
December 14, 2023	Romania	Russia	A Russian drone violated Romanian airspace and crashed on Romanian territory, resulting in German and Romanian fighter jets being scrambled.
December 29, 2023	Poland	Russia	A Russian missile violated Polish airspace for less than three minutes, during which time the missile was tracked by Polish and allied radar systems. The Russian chargé d'affaires was summoned by Poland in response.

=== 2024 ===
Date	Non‑combatant country	Committed by	Nature of violation
March 24, 2024	Poland	Russia	A Russian cruise missile, aimed at Ukraine, violated Polish airspace for 39 seconds, near the village of Oserdów. In response, Polish and allied aircraft were activated.
April 17–18, 2024	Romania	Unknown	Three unidentified unmanned aerial vehicles were detected flying close to the Mihail Kogălniceanu Air Base on April 17. The drones, determined to be small commercial types, were subsequently brought down with electronic warfare equipment, although no remains were found. The following day, another similar drone was detected close to the base. The military prosecutor's office started an investigation following the events.
June 14, 2024	Sweden	Russia	A Russian Su-24 violated the airspace of Sweden east of the southern point of Gotland on the Friday evening. Two Swedish Air Force pilots called the pilot and warned him, getting no reply. Two JAS 39 Gripen intercepted the Russian airplane and escorted it away from Swedish airspace.
July 24–25, 2024	Romania	Russia	Night attacks launched on Ukraine for two consecutive days and multiple drones observed approaching the Romanian border. On both occasions Romanian F-16s were sent to monitor the situation in Tulcea County. Three Geran-2 drones entered Romanian territory on July 25 as claimed by the Ukrainian Air Force. The drones subsequently crashed and the wrecks were identified in the aftermath.
September 7, 2024	Latvia	Russia	A drone crashed in the Rēzekne Municipality after flying through Belarus. A week before the incident, on August 27, 2024, the Minister of Defense of Latvia announced a "concrete reaction" in response if incidents involving a Russian drone continue to be repeated on NATO territory
September 8, 2024	Romania	Russia	The drone violated the airspace of Romania, a search for its wreckage was conducted in a deserted area on the outskirts of the city of Periprava
September 27, 2024	Romania	Russia	A drone briefly entered Romanian airspace during a Russian attack on Ukraine. Four aircraft were brought to monitor the situation.
October 17, 2024	Romania	Unknown	A "small aerial target" was detected over the Black Sea, about 150 km east of Mihail Kogălniceanu. The object proceeded to fly 14 km in the Romanian airspace around Eforie Nord, later towards Topraisar. Spanish and Romanian jets were sent out to monitor the situation but made no contact with the target. The radar contact was lost near Amzacea. No impact zones were identified.
October 19, 2024	Romania	Unknown	Another "small aerial target" was detected 45 km east of Sfântu Gheorghe, Tulcea. Spanish and Romanian fighters were again sent to visually identify the object but did not detect anything. Radar contact was lost south of Cogealac and no impact zones were identified in the aftermath.

=== 2025 ===
Date	Non‑combatant country	Committed by	Nature of violation
January 17, 2025	Romania	Russia	The Romanian Ministry of National Defence announced that several Russian drones entered Romanian airspace. A possible drone impact zone was identified near Plauru.
February 11, 2025	Poland	Russia	A Russian Su-24 violated Polish airspace near Gdańsk Bay for one minute and 12 seconds, reaching 6.5 kilometres (4 miles) into Polish territory. Polish military officials reported that Russia had admitted the airspace violation and blamed it on a malfunction in the Su-24's navigation system.
April 25, 2025	Poland	Russia	A Russian military helicopter from the Baltic Fleet entered Polish airspace over its territorial waters in the evening. It was tracked by military radar and the Polish Air Navigation Agency until it left the airspace.
July 10, 2025	Lithuania	Belarus	A drone launched from Belarus crashed shortly after crossing the border.
July 21, 2025	Romania	Ukraine	Four Ukrainian aircraft unintentionally entered Romanian airspace for a few minutes on the night of July 21 during a Russian attack in northern Ukraine. At around 3:00 am, Romanian radar detected 12 Ukrainian aerial contacts in Ukrainian airspace on Romania's northern border. Two Romanian F-16s were scrambled from the 86th Air Base, followed by two Italian Typhoons from the 57th Air Base. The Ukrainian aircraft briefly entered Romanian airspace around the Sighetu Marmației and Vicovu de Sus areas without posing any threat.
July 28, 2025	Lithuania	Belarus	An explosive-laden drone launched from Belarus hit a military training camp in Gaižiūnai, about 100 kilometres (62 mi) from the Belarus border. In its path to the facilities, the unmanned aircraft overflew the capital Vilnius. The remains of the drone were not found until August 1st, and carried a payload of 2 kilograms (4.4 lb) of explosives, which was neutralized by military specialists. The unmanned aircraft was apparently of the Gerbera type.
August 20, 2025	Poland	Russia	A Russian drone, likely a Geran-2, crashed and exploded around midnight in Osiny, Łuków County, a village located around 100 kilometres (62 mi) away from the Polish border, 80 kilometres (50 mi) from Warsaw and 40 kilometres (25 mi) away from the Dęblin Air Base. The remains were identified in the morning on August 20 in a 8–10 metres (26–33 ft)-diameter burnt area. The drone was not detected by radar. Buildings from the village were damaged in the explosion but there were no injuries.
August 25, 2025	Estonia; Latvia	Ukraine	During a Ukrainian drone attack on Saint Petersburg and Ust-Luga, a drone violated Latvian airspace and travelled onward into Estonia, where it crashed and exploded in a field in Tartu County. Early findings from an Estonian investigation identified it as a Ukrainian drone that had veered off course due to Russian radio jamming.
September 4, 2025	Poland	Russia	Two Russian drones entered Polish airspace during an attack on western Ukraine. Polish and allied aircraft were scrambled in response to the attack and the drones were closely monitored until they left the Polish territory.
September 8, 2025	Poland	Unknown	An unarmed drone with Cyrillic markings crashed in Polatycze near the Belarus–Poland border.
September 9, 2025	Poland	Russia	2025 Russian drone incursion into Poland: On the night of September 9/10, multiple Russian drones entered Polish airspace. Allied aircraft including Polish, Dutch, Italian and American began operating in the airspace, and air defense and radar systems were put on high alert. At least 21 drones were recorded in Polish airspace. The Warsaw International, Warsaw Modlin, Rzeszów and Lublin airports were temporarily closed that night due to "unplanned military activity". Up to four Russian drones were shot down. One drone crashed in Oleśno, near Elbląg, more than 200 km away from Poland's eastern border. Poland invoked Article 4 of the North Atlantic Treaty as a response to this incident.
September 13, 2025	Romania	Russia	A Russian drone was detected in Romanian airspace. Two F-16s were scrambled to monitor the border with Ukraine at 18:05 and subsequently intercepted the drone. The two aircraft tracked it for about 50 minutes from Chilia Veche to Pardina where it crossed into Ukraine. Permission was given to shoot down the drone but the pilots decided against opening fire to avoid potential collateral damage. The Russian ambassador was summoned by the Minister of Foreign Affairs in the aftermath.
September 19, 2025	Estonia	Russia	Three Russian MiG-31 fighter jets violated Estonian airspace around Vaindloo in the Gulf of Finland for a total of 12 minutes; the jets reportedly had no flight plans and their transponders turned off. The Estonian Defence Forces published a chart of the flight showing the jets flying in a straight line parallel to the Estonia border from east to west. The Russian Chargé d'Affaires was summoned to the Ministry of Foreign Affairs of Estonia in protest and handed a diplomatic note. Estonia invoked Article 4 of the North Atlantic Treaty as a response to this incident.
September 19, 2025	Poland	Russia	Two Russian fighter jets violated safety zone of the Orlen Petrobaltic drilling platform.
September 22–28, 2025	Denmark; Norway	Unknown	2025 European drone sightings: On September 22, unidentified drones, suspected to be Russian, violated Denmark's airspace, specifically near Copenhagen Airport. Other drone sightings took place in the following days near other airports in Denmark. Likewise, Norway also reported drone sightings over its airports.
October 6, 2025	Lithuania	Belarus	Weather balloons carrying black-market cigarettes led to the shutdown of Vilnius airport. At least 14 balloons were launched from Belarus, resulting in the cancellation of 30 flights. On 27 October, after the situation repeated itself numerous times throughout the month, Lithuanian Prime Minister Inga Ruginiene said that the incidents were "a tool of hybrid aggression against Europe” and that the Lithuanian army was taking "all necessary measures" to shoot down the balloons. Lithuanian border guard closed the border with Belarus on 26 October for 24 hours, but Ruginiene prolongued the restrictions for three days. She said the government was discussing to extend the measure indefinitely. On 29 October, it was decided that the border would remain closed until 30 November 2025.
October 17, 2025	Estonia	Unknown	Two unidentified drones overflew Camp Reedo, a US Army base in Southern Estonia; one of them was shot down with an anti-drone gun. Estonian security forces were still searching for the unmanned aircraft as of 29 October.
October 23, 2025	Lithuania	Russia	An Su 30 fighter and an Il-78 refueling tanker that departed from Kaliningrad entered briefly the Lithuanian airspace. Spanish Eurofighter jets took off for an air patrol of the area.
November 2–3, 2025	Belgium; Netherlands	Unknown	2025 European drone sightings: Several drones were observed over the Kleine Brogel Air Base. A helicopter was deployed to the airbase in response. The drones continued flying towards the Netherlands. Further sightings were reported over other Belgian military bases.
November 11, 2025	Romania	Russia	A Russian drone entered and crashed on Romanian territory just after midnight, on November 11, during an attack on Ukraine in the Izmail area. Weather conditions did not allow for NATO and Romanian fighter jets to be deployed. The drone fragments were identified in an inhabited area after the incident, as confirmed by the Romanian Foreign Minister.
November 19, 2025	Moldova; Romania	Russia	A Russian drone entered Romanian airspace around 00:20 near Vylkove, penetrated 8 km into Romanian territory around the villages of Periplava and Chilia Veche, then entered Ukrainian airspace again. Minutes later, it entered Moldovan airspace over the autonomous region of Gagauzia, flew over the village of Colibași and then entered Romanian airspace again minutes before 01:00, close to the border village of Oancea. Four jets, two Romanian and two German, were scrambled to intercept it, but signals from the drone were lost, and it is unknown what happened to it. Romanian authorities launched a search for possible impact zones.
November 22, 2025	Netherlands	Unknown	2025 European drone sightings: Several drones overflew Volkel Air Base, home of Royal Dutch Air Force and USAF squadrons. The Dutch military on the ground opened fire on the incursors, but no wreckage was found. The airport of Eindhoven was shut down for several hours.
November 25, 2025	Moldova	Russia	Around 9:00 in the morning, a Russian drone crashed on the roof of a house in the village of Cuhureștii de Jos, located 20 km from the Ukrainian border. No people were injured as the drone did not explode, and people in the proximity of the impact zone were evacuated. Six drones were recorded as violating Moldovan airspace that morning.
November 25, 2025	Romania	Russia	Hours before the incident in neighbouring Moldova, two drones were detected in Romania. The first one entered Romanian airspace at around 06:30 around Chilia Veche, Tulcea County, it was tracked by German fighters but the drone re-entered Ukrainian airspace. Minutes later, another drone that may had also penetrated Moldovan airspace was detected in Galați County, heading west. Two Romanian F-16s were scrambled for monitoring, but had no visual contact. At 08:50, the drone was caught on camera by a passer-by over the city of Tecuci, after the Government issued a RO-Alert alarm for Vrancea County. The incursion was the deepest into Romanian territory since the escalation of the war in February 2022. After four hours into Romanian territory, the drone crashed in Vaslui County, in the courtyard of a local from the village of Puiești.
November 29, 2025	Lithuania	Belarus	Vilnius airport was closed once again, this time for 11 hours, due to meteorological balloons launched from Belarus. Lithuania's deputy Foreign Minister, Taurimas Valys, said that the incident was part of "a cynical hybrid attack against our economy, aviation security, and the entire nation". The following day, Belarusian officials claimed that a drone launched from Lithuania and carrying a camera and "extremist printed materials" landed near Grodno. Russian sources reported that the aerial vehicle was "a reconnaissance drone manufactured in Germany". The director of the Lithuanian drone maker company Granta Autonomy later confirmed the drone was a Hornet XR, a model produced by Granta, but concluded that the drone was somehow modified and the incident was probably a provocation staged by Belarus.
December 1, 2025	Germany	Russia	2025 European drone sightings: Three suspected Russian drones overflew the site of the deployment of anti-ballistic Arrow-3 missiles at the German Air Force base of Annaburg, Saxony-Anhalt. A Bundeswehr's rapid reaction detachment launched a drone to intercept the unmanned aircraft. After making visual contact with one of the intruders through their own drone, the German troops attempted to shoot down them with G27P assault rifles fitted with Israeli Smash X4 smart sights, to no avail.
December 3, 2025	Lithuania	Belarus	Vilnius airport operations were temporarily shut down at evening for the tenth time in two months after another suspected incursion of weather balloons from Belarus.
December 4, 2025	France	Unknown	2025 European drone sightings: The French naval base at Île Longue, Finistère, Brittany, home of the four Triomphant-class nuclear submarines, was overflown by five unidentified drones. There were reports of naval troops firing at the intruders. Defence Minister Catherine Vautrin confirmed that the drones were "intercepted" by personnel at the base, though she didn't mention whether they were shot down, jammed or neutralized in another way.
December 15, 2025	Turkey	Russia	An out-of-control drone was shot down by a Turkish Air Force F-16 over the Black Sea near Çankırı on December 15, after it entered Turkish airspace. Two other drones were found crashed on 19 and 20 December in Kocaeli and Balıkesir, respectively. Turkey's interior minister identified the drone found at Kocaeli as a Russian-made Orlan-10.
December 25, 2025	Poland	Belarus	According to Poland's National Security Bureau, dozens of objects, four of them identified as smuggling balloons, entered Polish airspace from Belarus, in a move described by Polish officials as "a provocation disguised as a smuggling operation".

=== 2026 ===
Date	Non‑combatant country	Committed by	Nature of violation
February 25, 2026	Romania	Russia	2026 drone incidents in Romania: A Russian drone entered Romanian airspace minutes before 6 pm over Sfântu Gheorghe, tens of kilometres from the Romanian-Ukrainian border, and left it about 20 minutes later over Sulina, continuing to voyage over the Romanian Exclusive Economic Zone. Residents of Tulcea County were advised through the RO-Alert system to pay attention to objects falling from the sky. The drone penetrating Romanian airspace from over the Black Sea comes two weeks after fragments of a Russian drone drifted ashore near Mamaia, Constanța County.
February 26, 2026	Sweden France	Russia	Øresund drone incident: The Swedish Navy patrol boat HSwMS Rapp neutralized a Russian drone by jamming it over the Öresund, after the unmanned aircraft was launched from the Russian intelligence-gathering ship Zhigulevsk, which had been tracked by the Swedish vessel. The incident was classified as a "serious security alert" by the authorities. According to them, the Swedish ship "took countermeasures to disrupt the drone". The interception took place 7 miles (11 km) away from the French aircraft carrier Charles de Gaulle, at the time in a stopover at Malmö and apparently the target of the reconnaissance drone.
February 26–27, 2026	Romania	Russia	2026 drone incidents in Romania: In the course of Russian airstrikes on Ukraine Danube ports, the Romanian Air Force scrambled F-16 fighter jets from Fetești Air Base when a Russian drone briefly travelled through Romanian airspace. The incident triggered an air alert in Tulcea County, but the drone eventually crossed the Romanian border to reenter Ukraine. The following day. a Russian drone flying towards Romania was downed by a Ukrainian missile 100 metres from the Romanian village of Chilia Veche. Once again, F-16 fighters took off from Fetești to monitor the airspace, while specialized teams were put on alert to search for fragments of the drone that could have fallen on Romanian soil.
March 13, 2026	Romania	Russia	2026 drone incidents in Romania: A Russian drone was caught on camera by a resident of Pardina while flying low over the Romanian village. An alert was previously triggered for the Chilia Veche-Vylkove area of the Romanian-Ukrainian border, with a high possibility of drone impacts on Romanian territory. Two Romanian F-16s, followed by two German Eurofighters, were scrambled to monitor the airspace.
March 17, 2026	Moldova	Russia	A Russian Geran-2 fell near the village of Tudora, Ștefan Vodă district, close to the state border. Moldova summoned the Russian ambassador for a meeting and delivered a formal protest note.
March 18, 2026	Estonia	Russia	The Estonian Defense Forces reported on March 19 that a Russian Su-30 fighter jet violated Estonian airspace over the Gulf of Finland near Vaindloo Island on March 18. The Russian aircraft had no published flight plans and no two-way radio contact with Estonian air traffic control.
March 21, 2026	Poland	Belarus	Polish authorities reported on March 21 that they found five balloons across Podlaskie Voivodeship along Poland’s eastern border with Belarus.
March 23, 2026	Lithuania	Ukraine	2026 drone incursions into the Baltic states and Finland: Night-time security camera footage shows a drone that had entered the country’s airspace crashing into the frozen Lake Lavysas, some 20 km (12 miles) from the border with Belarus, and exploding. According to a Lithuanian army spokesperson, given the proximity of the border, the unmanned aircraft likely came from Belarus. On March 24, Lithuanian Prime Minister reported that it was a Ukrainian drone aimed to Russia that strayed its flight path. She added that "This is not a local incident, this is a part of ‌wider security picture. Russian aggression against Ukraine creates additional risks for the whole region".
March 25, 2026	Estonia Latvia	Ukraine	2026 drone incursions into the Baltic states and Finland: A drone coming from Russia's airspace hit a chimney of the Auvere power plant in Estonia, near Narva, while another, also from Russia, crashed in Latvia. The incidents occurred the same day that Ukrainian forces carried out a massive drone attack on the Russian oil export hub of Ust-Luga, in the Baltic Sea. The drones could have been deflected or actively redirected by Russian GPS jammers.
March 26, 2026	Romania	Russia	2026 drone incidents in Romania: A Russian drone entered Romanian airspace at 00:44 and crashed four kilometres into Romanian territory, near the village of Parcheș. No victims or material damage was reported despite the drone detonating.
March 29, 2026	Finland	Ukraine	2026 drone incursions into the Baltic states and Finland: Several unidentified drones violated Finland’s airspace near its southeastern border with Russia, with at least two crashing near Kouvola; Finnish authorities launched an investigation and scrambled F/A-18 Hornet jets to identify the objects. The following day, Ministry of Foreign Affairs of Ukraine spokesperson Georgiy Tykhyi confirmed the drones were Ukrainian and that they had apologised to Finland for the incident. Prime Minister Petteri Orpo tied the events to Ukrainian operations against nearby Russian targets, noting that the drones may have strayed into Finland’s airspace due to Russian electronic countermeasures.
April 16–17, 2026	Romania	Russia	2026 drone incidents in Romania: In the course of a wave of Russian drone attacks on Ukraine, a Russian drone was picked up by a military radar violating Romanian airspace over the border village of Chilia Veche.
April 25, 2026	Romania	Russia	2026 drone incidents in Romania: On the morning of April 25, Romanian radar detected Russian drones flying close to the border during an attack on Ukrainian ports. As a result, two RAF Eurofighter Typhoons on Air Policing missions based at the 86th Air Base were ordered to take off by the Combined Air Operations Centre Torrejón and local anti-air defences were placed in firing positions. Ground radar tracked 15 drones in Ukrainian airspace over Reni. The British fighters also picked up a radar contact over Ukrainian territory some 1.5 kilometres (0.93 mi) from Reni and received authorisation to neutralise the target, but came back to the base without engaging. Subsequently, one drone continued flying at low altitude over Lake Brateș and hit a house and a power pole in the Bariera Traian quarter of Galați. This was the first occasion that a Russian drone incident results in damage of property in Romania. Fragments of another drone were also found in Văcăreni, Tulcea County. In both cases, the civilian population in the areas was evacuated before the remains were removed by specialist teams and safely disposed off. The Russian ambassador was summoned by the Minister of Foreign Affairs in the aftermath. A second drone with explosives on board was identified near Văcăreni on April 26. It was destroyed by an SRI pyrotechnics team.
May 3, 2026	Romania	Unknown	2026 drone incidents in Romania: An drone without explosives fell about 20 km (12 mi) away from the border with Ukraine, near the village of Șerbăuți in Suceava County. A local discovered it and called the authorities. It was the third time since the start of the conflict that Romanian airspace was violated via the north section of the border with Ukraine.
May 3, 2026	Finland	Unknown	Two unidentified drones entered briefly Finland's airspace from Russia over the municipalities of Virolahti and Hamina. Finnish Air Force quick-reaction fighter jets took off to face the treat, and the airspace was closed for three hours.
May 7, 2026	Latvia	Ukraine	2026 drone incursions into the Baltic states and Finland: An undetermined number of drones entered Latvian airspace from Russia, one of them hitting an oil storage facility at Rezekne, setting it on fire and damaging four empty tanks. At least another drone crashed on Latvian soil. French military aircraft took off to face the threat. Shortly after the incident, the Russian Defense Ministry claimed Ukraine used Latvian airspace to conduct drone strikes on civilian targets in Saint Petersburg. A later Russian report added that six drones were picked up by Russian air defences over Latvian territory, and that one of them, a Ukrainian An-196 Liutyi long-range attack drone, was shot down when entering Russian airspace. The other five disappeared over Rezekne. Ukrainian Foreign Minister Andrii Sybiha later claim that Ukrainian drones had entered Latvia as a result of Russian electronic jamming that redirected the unmanned aircraft to Latvian airspace. Lithuanian military expert Vaidotas Malinionis said that Russia was taking advantage of the stray drone issue to put pressure on NATO by claiming that the Baltic states were allowing Ukrainian drones to transit through their airspaces. According to Malinionis, the Russian Army could just disrupt the unmanned aircraft direction by jamming and then leverage the incidents “to create some kind of pressure on us and to make us feel uneasy”.
May 8, 2026	Poland	Russia	A Russian reconnaissance drone fell on Polish soil near the village of Oseka, Warmian-Masurian Voivodeship, shortly after flying undetected over the border with the Russian region of Kaliningrad. Military Gendarmerie, firefighters, and bomb disposal teams inspected the unmanned aircraft and determined it posed no threat. The drone was fitted with cameras and was marked with Russian inscripts.
May 16, 2026	Turkey	Ukraine	On the morning of May 16, an UAV crashed into in the city of Samsun, damaging two buildings. No injuries were recorded and residents initially thought the impact of the drone was a natural gas explosion. Local authorities collected the drone remains for technical examination. Reports following the incident noted the drone was a Ukrainian Maya decoy drone which likely suffered a technical malfunction.
May 17, 2026	Lithuania	Ukraine	2026 drone incursions into the Baltic states and Finland: Two drones that crashed in Lithuania's soil, one of them on May 17, the other in March, were of Ukrainian origin, reported on May 21 Lithuanian defense Minister Robertas Kaunas. The minister declared to the news agency ELTA that “Their targets were in Russia”, and that “The most likely reason for their deviation is the impact of Russian electronic warfare systems. The investigation into the recovered drones is continuing, assessing other possible causes.” The drone that fell in March was found in the district of Varena, while the second drone was recovered in Samané, Utena district. Explosives were neutralized in situ in the later case.
May 17, 2026	Latvia	Unknown	Latvian armed forces issued an air alert along the border with Russia, where residents were urged to take shelter. NATO aircraft were scramble to search for the threat, but the drone eventually left Latvia's airspace.
May 19, 2026	Estonia	Ukraine	2026 drone incursions into the Baltic states and Finland: A Ukrainian drone was shot down by a Romanian F-16 fighter jet. Two Romanian jets from the Carpathian Vipers detachment on the Baltic Air Policing mission over Estonia were scrambled by the Combined Air Operations Center Uedem before the decision was taken to shoot down the drone. It was the first time that a drone was shot down in Estonia by NATO aircraft. The drone had entered the southeastern part of the country after crossing Russia under conditions of heavy Russian electronic warfare, and was tracked by NATO surveillance equipment. The Ukrainian Minister of Defence issued an apology in the aftermath. A drone also supposedly crossed into Latvian airspace the same day. The incident disrupted local operations—halting train services, pausing ninth-grade exams, and closing shops. Latvian authorities later said no evidence that a drone had entered national air space was found.
May 20, 2026	Lithuania	Unknown	Lithuania issued a "red" (highest) air warning after a drone violated the country's airspace. It was for first time from the restoration of Lithuanian state. Due to air raid warning, air traffic at Vilnius Airport, train services around the capital, and working of supermarkekts were temporarily suspended. In some parts of Lithuania, people were asked to go to the shelter or other safe place using wireless emergency alert system (cell broadcast technology). NATO jets has been used to try to shoot the drone, but did not succeed.
May 21, 2026	Latvia Lithuania	Unknown	Drone alerts were issued in some parts of Lithuania and Latvia; NATO aircraft took off to face the threat.
May 23, 2026	Latvia	Unknown	A drone plummeted into Lake Drīdzis in Kombuliai rural municipality and exploded on impact. A search operation was launched involving a drone of the State Police, a boat of the State Fire and Rescue Service, and members of the National Armed Forces. Wreckage purportedly from the drone was recovered.
May 23, 2026	Lithuania	Belarus	Lithuania border guards manning a border post at Purvėnai, in the Šalčininkai District, brought down a homemade drone coming from Belarus after receiving an alert from the Lithuanian Air Force. The drone, believed to belong to smugglers, was neutralized when approaching the border post at Eišiškės and fell near the village of Dumblé. A report from Lithuania's State Border Guard Service reveals that 18 unmanned aerial vehicles carrying smuggled goods from Belarus have been downed by the authorities since early 2026, compared to 59 cross-border drones intercepted in 2025. On May 26, 2026, Ursula von der Leyen visited Lithuania in due to violations of EU airspace by drones. She met leading politicians from all of the Baltic countries.
May 27, 2026	Finland	Russia	Finland's defence forces reported that a Russian aircraft violated Finland's airspace while taking a safe route during a thunderstorm off the coast of Porkkala, in the Gulf of Finland. The Finnish Air Force launched an "operational flight" in order to deal with the incident.
May 28, 2026	Romania	Unknown	2026 drone incidents in Romania: A drone without explosives was found in the area of Băsești, Maramureș County.
May 29, 2026	Romania	Russia	2026 Galați drone incident: During a Russian attack on Ukraine's internal ports, radars detected several drones near the Romanian border; two jets and one helicopter of the Romanian Air Force sortied in response at 1:19 am. A Geran-2 drone entered Romanian airspace shortly before 2:00 am and visual contact was reported, but later lost. Minutes later, a huge explosion was reported in Galați, the eighth largest city of the country, which was instantly attributed to the drone as its sound and subsequent fire mushroom was caught on camera by several people. The stray drone hit the roof of an apartment building, right above an apartment which was destroyed and set on fire by the explosion. Its residents, a woman and her son, were injured but managed to self-evacuate, as did 70 other people. Several apartments suffered damage, as well as five cars right next to the building. Diplomatic response came almost immediately. Foreign Minister of Romania, Oana Țoiu, summoned the Russian ambassador and handed him a note of protest, calling the incident ”a grave and reckless escalation.” Interim Prime Minister Ilie Bolojan cut short a visit to Moldova and returned to Romania later that same day. President Nicușor Dan convened a meeting of the Supreme Council of National Defence and ordered the closure of the Russian consulate in Constanța, active since 1947, as well as the expulsion of the consul, which was also declared persona non-grata by the Romanian state. In turn, Russia closed the Romanian consulate in Saint Petersburg. Spokeswoman of the Ministry of Foreign Affairs of the Russian Federation, Maria Zakharova, denounced the accusations of the Romanian state regarding the origin of the drone as ”unfounded and baseless”. President Vladimir Putin, speaking at a summit in Astana, Kazakhstan, claimed that the drone was Ukrainian and asked the Romanian authorities to hand the wreckage of the drone over to Russia for an analysis. The request was denied by Romania, which confirmed the Russian origin of the drone the same day, based on an inscription in the Cyrillic alphabet on a drone flap, standard for Russian Geran-2 drones. International leaders expressed solidarity with Romania following the incident, including Ursula von der Leyen, President of the European Commission, Mark Rutte, Secretary General of NATO, Volodymyr Zelenskyy, Maia Sandu and most of the European leaders. President Nicușor Dan thanked the international community for its support, as well as later confirming the full coverage of the damage by the Romanian state and a new jurisdiction for the defence of the national airspace. He later stated that, shall such incidents happen again, Romania will shut down the Russian embassy in Bucharest.
June 8, 2026	Moldova	Undisclosed	An UAV with Ukrainian marks, which Ukraine argued was Russian bearing false insignia , crashed and exploded near the village of Lopatna, 55 kms northeast of Chișinău and right next to the Dniester river separating Moldovan-controlled territory from the secessionist pro-Russian state of Transnistria. The incident came only hours after President Maia Sandu stated that Moldova should reinforce its anti-drone systems and attract military investments.
June 8, 2026	Latvia	Ukraine	2026 drone incursions into the Baltic states and Finland: A drone was shot down by a Dassault Rafale fighter of the French Air Force of the Baltic Air Policing mission over the village of Berzgale, in eastern Latvia. The Latvian army did not specify the origin of the drone, however it was mentioned that it had entered Latvian airspace from Russia as a result of Russian electronic warfare. The drone was identified as a Ukrainian Maya decoy drone.
July 12, 2026	Moldova	Russia	The Moldovan Ministry of Defense reported that a Russian Geran-2 crashed and exploded in Copanca, roughly 25 kilometers from the Moldovan-Ukrainian border, after the Russian drone entered Moldovan airspace.
July 24, 2026	Romania	Russia	2026 drone incidents in Romania: On the morning of July 24, Romanian radars detected an aerial target 20 km off Sulina, flying on a Sulina-Brăila-Fetești-Buzău route. Two Italian Eurofighters from the 57th Air Base, two Romanian F-16s from the 86th Air Base and an IAR 330 SOCAT helicopter were scrambled in response. The drone was visually identified as a Shahed-type. One of the Italian fighters attempted to engage the drone, but the missile missed its target. Subsequently, the UAV was shot down by a Romanian F-16 near Padina, Buzău. This event marked the first time a drone was shot down in Romanian airspace, and the second time a drone was shot down by Romanian F-16s over NATO airspace. The Prosecutor General's Office confirmed the drone was a Russian Shahed (Geran-2) the next day after analyzing the remains.
July 25, 2026	Romania	Russia	2026 drone incidents in Romania: On July 25, another drone was destroyed by a Romanian F-16 over Romania. At 6:21 am, a group of drones was identified by radar northwest of Snake Island during an attack on Ukrainian infrastructure, and two F-16s took off in response. At 8:22, one drone was detected inside Romanian airspace. Eleven minutes later, the same pilot who engaged the first drone the previous day shot it down over Sfântu Gheorghe, Tulcea, close to the border with Ukraine.
July 26, 2026	Romania	Russia	2026 drone incidents in Romania: On July 26, a third drone was shot down by a Romanian F-16. The drone was destroyed over Romania's territorial waters, 12 km North-East off Sulina, 5 minutes after it had entered into Romanian airspace. Romania's Foreign Minister summoned the Russian ambassador after the third airspace violation in three days. Following the three incidents, the Romanian ambassador to Moscow was recalled and a staff member of the Russian embassy in Romania was declared persona non grata on July 27. Romania will further present information regarding the drones shot down over its territory in a North Atlantic Council meeting taking place in August.
July 27, 2026	Romania	Russia	2026 drone incidents in Romania: Another Russian drone briefly entered Romanian airspace on July 27, and quickly returned to Ukraine before it could be intercepted.
July 30, 2026	Poland	Russia	A Russian cruise missile crossed the border into Poland and hit a field close to the village of Tarnawa-Kolonia, 100 km away from the border with Ukraine, detonating on impact. The missile tore a 33 feet (10 m) wide and 16 ft (4.9 m) crater into the ground just outside the settlement. According to Prime Minister Donald Tusk, the missile was likely a Russian Kh-101. Previously, a missile was detected close to the Poland–Ukraine border but it turned back. Subsequently, another missile was detected inside Polish airspace and an F-16 was sent to intercept, but the cruise missile disappeared from radar a few minutes after. An Mi-24 helicopter was also sent to the area before the missile crashed. Air warning sirens sounded in Lublin, Krasnytaw and across the Lublin Voivodeship. Polish authorities later officially identified the missile as a Russian Kh-101. Poland will present information regarding this incident in a North Atlantic Council meeting.
August 2, 2026	Romania	Russia	2026 drone incidents in Romania: A drone flew over Romania's territorial waters, then along the Sulina branch of the Danube for about 20 minutes before passing to Ukraine where it was shot down by the Ukrainians. Drone wreckage fell in a field near Periprava, Tulcea county, 1 km from the border.
August 3, 2026	Turkey	Unknown	An UAV was discovered in the village of Örhenli. Teams dispatched to the area inspected the wreck and removed it for further analysis. Authorities determined that the drone crashed after losing communication with its operator.
August 4, 2026	Germany	Russia	2026 Leipzig Airport drone incidents: A home-made quadrocopter drone carrying 800 gr of explosive was found in a cargo area of Leipzig airport, near a Ukrainian cargo plane. The unmanned aerial vehicle was flying at a very low alttitude, and was brought down by an airport bus driver, according to Christian Democratic Union lawmaker Detlef Seif. A detonator mishap prevented the explosion of the bomb. Another unidentified object, presumably a second drone, collided 400 m over Leipzig airport with a DHL cargo plane which was attempting to land. The aircraft had to abort its landing at Leipzig and climbed off for another location. The American intelligence community blames Russia for the incidents.
August 7, 2026	Germany	Russia	Two drones overflew a German military base in Mechernich, close to the border wih Belgium; Euskirchen police department opened an investigation of the incident. The Bundeswehr facilities in Mechernich house a heavily fortified subterranean depot for defense gear and machinery components. Additionally, the base serves as a hub for technicians tasked with servicing American Patriot missile defense units.
August 8, 2026	Bulgaria Romania	Ukraine	Bulgarian Prime Minister Rumen Radev announced that a drone crossed into Bulgarian airspace from Romania and exploded in a field near the Kardam border crossing, just 100 metres (330 ft) inside Bulgarian borders. Neither country detected the drone on radar. The drone went off 200 metres (660 ft) from a compressor station in Romania and 1,000 metres (3,300 ft) from a second compressor of the Trans-Balkan pipeline in Bulgarian territory. The incident resulted in no casualties or damage. Romanian border police recorded the drone's sound before a Bulgarian patrol spotted black smoke coming from a sunflower field after a loud explosion. Later, a Bulgarian border police unit specialized in drone detection and electronic countermeasures was moved from the border with Turkey to the border with Romania. According to the preliminary analysis of the wreckage, the drone was likely a Ukrainian Maya decoy drone. Ukrainian officials denied to have intentionally targeted Bulgaria. Bulgarian Defence Minister Dimitar Stoyanov stated that Bulgaria would raise the issue regarding the incident in a planned North Atlantic Council meeting. Poland and Romania were also to provide information regarding their own incidents with Russian missiles and drones.
August 9, 2026	Moldova	Russia	A Russian drone crashed and exploded near the village of Crocmaz. The explosion broke windows of several nearby houses and triggered a vegetation fire which caused damage on an 800 m (2,600 ft) radius. Preliminary reports showed that the drone might have been an S8000 Banderol cruise missile, the first of which to be identified in Moldova. The head of the Government of Moldova condemned the war in Ukraine and declared that "we all know who the aggressor is." Moldova further recalled its ambassador from Moscow for consultations on August 10. In response, a statement from the Russian Embassy in Chișinău accused Moldova of using the drone explosion in Crocmaz as a pretext for deteriorating bilateral relations. According to the Moldovan Ministry of Defense, as of 28 July 2026, 60 incidents of airspace violations by Russian missiles and drones were registered, steadily increasing from 5 incidents in 2022 to 21 incidents in 2025, and 15 incidents in the first seven months of 2026.
August 10, 2026	Moldova	Russia	Another drone entered Moldovan airspace during an attack on the Odesa Oblast. The drone was detected flying from Stepanivka and passed into Moldovan airspace near Priozerna before returning to Ukraine one minute later, at 23:42. The authorities determined that the drone was a Geran-3 (Shahed 238).
August 11, 2026	Germany	Unknown	An unidentified drone, which could neither be tracked nor jammed, appeared at Hanover Airport, causing flight delays. The authorities suspect a link to several Russian drones in Germany that were spotted a week earlier.
August 13, 2026	Romania	Russia	2026 drone incidents in Romania: Three Russian drones violated Romanian airspace within twelve hours without reported crashes. The first was reported at 1:27 am and flew over Romanian territory for ten minutes. The second was reported at 9:02 AM and flew for two minutes, and the third was reported at 3:17 pm and flew for twelve minutes. Romanian F-16s were scrambled for the first two incidents and Spanish F-18s were scrambled for the third incident.
August 14, 2026	Latvia	Ukraine	2026 drone incursions into the Baltic states and Finland: An unmanned aerial vehicle entered Latvian airspace in the Balvi region as a result of Russian electronic warfare during an attack on Russian ports. Two Italian Eurofighter Typhoons from Šiauliai and two Turkish F-16s from Ämari on the NATO Baltic Air Policing mission were scrambled in response, and the drone was shot down at high altitude near Rugāji by an Italian Eurofighter. During these events, Finland also restricted its airspace in the eastern Gulf of Finland.
August 14, 2026	Romania	Russia	2026 drone incidents in Romania: A Russian drone entered Romanian airspace shortly after 11 am and crashed on a field near Luncavița, close to the cities of Brăila and Galați and right next to a stone quarry. The crash and subsequent explosion caused a vegetation fire which was quickly extinguished. The drone was not detected by radars as it cruised at low altitude. Later that day, wreckage of another drone of unknown origin was found in Plauru, right next to the border.
August 16, 2026	Moldova Romania	Russia	2026 drone incidents in Romania: A Russian Geran-2 drone which flew over Moldovan airspace in the early morning passed into Romanian airspace and was shot down by a Spanish F-18. The drone entered Moldova over the Etulia village and left near Slobozia Mare. It entered Romanian airspace, approximately 24 km (15 mi) north of Galați. Two Spanish F-18s on Quick Reaction Alert based at Mihail Kogălniceanu were preemptively scrambled and subsequently one fighter shot down the drone in an area between Băleni and Cudalbi.
August 17, 2026	Moldova	Russia	A Russian cruise missile crashed in Moldova 3 km (1.9 mi) away from the village of Talmaza in the afternoon of August 17. Police and emergency crews arrived on scene and quickly extinguished the fire triggered by the explosion. According to a Telegram post of the Ukrainian Air Force, the S8000 Banderol missile was tracked as it flew northwest past Odesa and crossed into Moldova. The Moldovan Defense Ministry confirmed that a missile was detected by radar as it entered the airspace, yet did not link it to the one tracked in Ukraine. The airspace over Sectorul Centru was closed for 15 minutes until the missile disappeared from radar near Talmaza. Just before the incident took place, Moldovan President Maia Sandu had stated in an interview with Teleradio-Moldova that she believed some of the Russian drones enter Moldovan airspace intentionally, to test the response of Moldova and other countries.
August 17, 2026	Turkey	Unknown	A stray drone crashed and exploded in the yard of the Arsin District Police Department in the Trabzon Province. No casualties were registered, but four vehicles were damaged and windows were broken at the police station and nearby buildings. Social media footage indicates the explosion was characteristic of a lighter FPV drone rather than the larger detonations usually caused by fixed-wing drones.
August 20, 2026	Romania	Russia	2026 drone incidents in Romania: A group of drones was detected near the border with Ukraine during the night, at 2:23 am. Two Spanish F-18s and a Romanian IAR 330 were scrambled. A drone subsequently entered Romanian airspace 13 km (8.1 mi) from Galați, and the crew of the Romanian helicopter reported that it crashed in a field, 4 km (2.5 mi) from Grindu, Tulcea, at 3:24 am. The remains of the drone were determined to not pose a threat and were taken by the Romanian Border Police for further inspection.
August 20, 2026	Moldova	Russia	On the same day as the Romanian incident, a Russian Geran-2 flew over Moldova from Kotlovyna in Ukraine to Etulia. The drone left the Moldovan airspace at 3:22 am. Also on the same day, a fire started by the explosion of a drone in Ukraine 150 m (490 ft) from the Giurgiulești-Reni border crossing at around 3:45 am, extended to an area of 70–100 m² on Moldovan territory. The fire was contained by firefighters at around 4:30 am. Wreckage of another Geran-2 drone was also discovered 1 km (0.62 mi) away from the border in Giurgiulești.
August 24, 2026	Moldova Romania	Russia	2026 drone incidents in Romania: A drone with no explosives on board entered Romanian airspace and crashed into a walnut tree, 5 m (16 ft) away from a household in the village of Ciușlea, Vrancea County. Villagers heard the UAV, but discovered it only after reporting a strong smell of fuel. Authorities evacuated an area of 300 m (980 ft) until they confirmed the drone did not carry any explosives. According to the Romanian MoND, it is possible that the drone was the same one detected in Moldovan airspace and it flew into Romania in the direction of Târgu Bujor. Two F-16s and an IAR 330 SOCAT were sent to monitor the area before the drone disappeared from radar near Furcenii Noi, Galați County.
August 27, 2026	Moldova	Russia	In the early hours of Moldova's national day, marking 35 years since Moldova declared its independence from the Soviet Union, as many as five Russian drones entered Moldovan airspace, one of which crashed near Chișinău where it was found by a local who alerted the authorities. The incident came amid Romanian President Nicușor Dan and Ukrainian President Volodymyr Zelenskyy's announced presence in Chișinău for the Moldovan Independence Day parade later the same day.
September 1, 2026	Romania	Unknown	2026 drone incidents in Romania: A damaged drone was discovered on a field in Viișoara, Vaslui County, 30 km (19 mi) from the border with Moldova. The authorities determined the drone contained explosives and isolated the area. The drone was destroyed by anti-terror specialists of the Romanian Intelligence Service. The Prosecutor's Office from Iași was notified to continue the investigation to determine where the drone came from.
September 2, 2026	Finland	Russia	2026 drone incursions into the Baltic states and Finland: A Russian civilian-type Geoscan 701 surveillance drone was found in Porvoo, southern Finland. Finnish Defense Minister Antti Häkkänen later disclosed that Russia had informed Finland of the stray drone just before the discovery.
September 8, 2026	Moldova Romania	Russia	2026 drone incidents in Romania: A Russian Geran-4 jet-powered drone which departed from Crimea entered Moldovan airspace shortly after 16:00 over Transnistria, heading southwest before taking a drastic turn towards Chișinău. The drone arrived near the Moldovan capital right as a plane carrying Ukrainian President Volodymyr Zelenskyy, the alleged target of the drone, was taking off from Chișinău International Airport for Norway. The drone then took another turn, flew over Nisporeni and entered Romanian airspace. The drone penetrated about 120 km deep into Romanian territory before making a 180° turn over Târgu Neamț and flying over several Romanian cities, including Iași, the third largest city in the country. Five counties, Botoșani, Iași, Neamț, Suceava and Vaslui were put on high alert, their residents being notified through the RO-Alert EAS system to seek shelter. The drone then re-entered Moldovan airspace and crashed in a sunflower field near Mihăileni, Rîșcani District, starting a fire. Moldovan authorities later confirmed the risk of the plane carrying Zelenskyy being dangerously close to be hit by the drone. In Romania, the Iași International Airport was shut down for several hours, delaying flights and diverting those meant to land there to nearby airports in Moldova and the rest of Romania. During the violation, two Spanish F-18 jets were scrambled to monitor the situation, but did not make visual contact with the drone. Additionally, eleven other NATO aircraft who were conducting an exercise over the Black Sea did not detect the drone either.
September 12, 2026	Romania Moldova	Russia	2026 drone incidents in Romania: The Romanian Ministry of National Defence reported that a drone crashed in a cornfield near Botoșanița Mare, Suceava County. The drone had previously crossed the airspace of Moldova, being first detected between Vasilcău and Băxani before reappearing near Cuconeștii Noi then entering northeastern Romania. Two Romanian F-16s took off from 86th Air Base Borcea to track the intruder. A RO alert was issued to take shelter for Botoșani County. No casualties were reported.
September 15, 2026	Lithuania	Russia	2026 drone incursions into the Baltic states and Finland: An unidentified drone entered Lithuanian airspace from Belarus travelling west, and was shot down by an Italian Typhoon fighter jet from Šiauliai over the village of Pratkūnai, Kaišiadorys district, between Vilnius and Kaunas. President Gitanas Nauséda later confirmed that the drone was Russian, of the Gerbera-2 type, and was likely aimed at Ukraine.
September 23, 2026	Poland	Russia	An Mi-8 helicopter from Kaliningrad briefly crossed into Polish airspace and stayed 42 seconds north of Braniewo, Warmian–Masurian Voivodeship. The helicopter was picked up by radar at 11:08 and Polish fighter jets were scrambled in response.
September 24, 2026	Moldova	Russia	At least four Russian drones entered Moldovan airspace on the morning of September 24 coming from the Vinnytsia, Odesa, and Chernivtsi regions. Moldova closed its airspace in the northern regions. Explosions were reported in the Florești and Șoldănești Districts.
September 24, 2026	Romania	Russia	2026 drone incidents in Romania: Also during the morning of September 24, another drone which was detected by Romanian radar over Ukraine near the Botoșani county, entered Romanian airspace and crashed near Solca, Suceava County after flying for four minutes in Romania. Two F-16s were scrambled in response but could not catch the drone before it crashed. Earlier in the night, two Spanish F-18s were scrambled to monitor the airspace along the southern border.
September 30, 2026	Moldova	Unknown	A drone of unknown origin entered Moldovan airspace at 5:34 am and crashed near the village of Hîrbovăț, Anenii Noi District. The impact caused an explosion that was recorded by a surveillance camera on a house in the village. The incident happened during a massive attack on Ukraine by Russia.
October 3, 2026	Romania	Russia	2026 drone incidents in Romania: A drone fell near the village of Plauru in Tulcea County at 5:00 am, amid an intense wave of Russian drone attacks on neighbouring Ukraine. A fire broke out at the site of the impact, but was quickly put out by a fire truck. The explosion left a crater in the spot. The location was sealed off by military authorities. No RO alert was issued to local residents of the area, and the unmanned aircraft was not picked up by the radars of the Romanian Ministry of Defense. No damage or casualties were reported.
October 3, 2026	Moldova	Russia	During the morning, six unauthorized overflights were reported by the authorities in several Moldovan raions, who later reported at least five explosions within 22 minutes. In all the instances, no victims were reported, but in Crocmaz, Ștefan Vodă District, a wildfire was ignited and a farm reported substantial infrastructure damage. Moldovan President Maia Sandu condemned the incident, saying that Russia represents a danger for Europe and must be stopped. The Russian Ambassador to Moldova, Oleg Ozerov, was handed a note of protest. The Moldovan Ministry of Internal Affairs later reported that at least three aerial objects responsible for the explosions were Banderol missiles.
October 5, 2026	Moldova	Russia	A Russian projectile struck the border checkpoint on the Palanca Moldovan-Ukrainian crossing, injuring one Moldovan border guard and damaging a passenger bus and a control booth.
October 14, 2026	Romania	Russia	A brief drone incursion into Romanian airspace was registered by a Romanian Ministry of Defense radar near Sulina, prompting the scrambling of two Romanian F-16 fighters; the unmanned aircraft reentered Ukrainian airspace, where it was shot down by local air defenses.
October 16/17, 2026	Moldova	Russia	In less than 24 hours during October 16–17, five Russian drones crashed in the northern and eastern districts. One person was injured and minor damage was caused by the drones. The Moldovan Foreign Ministry condemned Russia in the aftermath.
October 17, 2026	Romania	Russia	2026 drone incidents in Romania: A group of aerial contacts was detected flying near Snake Island in the late afternoon on October 17. Two F-16s were subsequently scrambled from the Borcea Air Base. At 17:59, one drone entered Romanian airspace and was shot down by one of the fighters two minutes later. Another drone entered Romanian airspace and was shot down by the other F-16 at 18:05. Both drones, identified as jet-powered Geran types, were destroyed over Romania's territorial waters.
October 18, 2026	Lithuania Poland	Ukraine	2026 drone incursions into the Baltic states and Finland: An unidentified drone entered Lithuanian airspace from Poland and exploded over the northern Lithuanian village of Juodzionys, where wreckage was found. NATO aircraft were scrambled to face the threat, but cloudy weather prevented them from making contact with the object. Residents in northern and central areas had to seek shelter for an hour after an alert was issued in the morning. Lithuanian president Gitanas Nausedas stated that "Russia's war of aggression against Ukraine is spilling over onto the Eastern flank of NATO and EU." Ukraine's foreign ministry regretted the incident, attributing it to Russian electronic warfare. Polish authorities were in close contact with Lithuanian officials over the incident. The Polish military was also investigating the purported violation of its airspace, even if no object was picked up by their radars.
October 31, 2026	Moldova Romania	Russia	2026 drone incidents in Romania: Two drones, identified as Russian Gerberas, entered Romanian airspace in the evening, flying from Moldova. They were first noted by the Moldovan Ministry of Defence as flying from the direction of the Odesa and Vinnytsia Oblasts, during a Russian attack. In Moldova, the authorities restricted the airspace over the northern regions of the country. After the drones passed into Romania in the north-east region, two F-16s were scrambled from the 86th Air Base, followed by another two F-16s from the 71st Air Base, as well as an IAR 330 SOCAT helicopter. Alerts were issued for several counties and the airspace was restricted, temporarily closing Iași Airport and diverting some passenger flights. One drone left the Romanian airspace, while the other disappeared from radar between Vaslui and Bacău counties. Restrictions were lifted at 19:19.
November 10/11, 2026	Estonia Latvia Lithuania Poland	Unknown	2026 drone incursions into the Baltic states and Finland: On the night of November 10/11, multiple drones and weather balloons were reported flying close to the Baltic airspace over the night. Three UAVs were detected in Belarusian airspace moving towards Latvia, two of which briefly entered Latvian airspace and left quickly. A fourth drone entered Lithuanian airspace from Belarus after briefly passing through Polish airspace. Italian Eurofighters were scrambled to engage the drone in response. One missile was fired but failed to hit the drone, and a second attempt was called off as the fighter experienced technical difficulties and returned to base. The drone continued flying into Latvia, then to Estonia and subsequently returned to Russian airspace. The origin of the drone and whether or not it was carrying explosives could not be established. A separate incident during the night involved around 10 weather balloons sighted on radar. Belarusian authorities also warned about the flight of the balloons over their country. The reported balloons disrupted airport operations in Lithuania.
November 13/14, 2026	Romania	Russia	2026 drone incidents in Romania: Four merchant vessels were hit and lightly damaged by drones within Romanian territorial waters over two consecutive days offshore the port of Sulina; in a separate incident, two Romanian F-16s were directed to an aerial target detected east of Snake Island. The first ship to be hit was the Palau-flagged Larissa 1 on November 13, while the others were the Eviapetrol V (Greece), Marsol (Saint Kitts and Nevis), and Ali Najafov (Saint Kitts and Nevis) on November 14. The incidents occurred amid Russian drone attacks on Ukrainian targets. The fires aboard the vessels were extinguished by their crews and no casualties were reported.
November 20, 2026	Poland	Russia	Three Russian Kh-101 cruise missile hit Poland's soil. One landing in a field near Nowy Lipowiec, Lublin Voivodeship, in southeastern Poland, some 50 kilometres (31 mi) from the Ukrainian border, according to Defence Minister Wladyslaw Kosiniak-Kamysz. Two struck areas near Rudnik nad Sanem, west of Nowy Lipowiec, and Mołodycz. Kosiniak-Kamysz dubbed the incident a "provocation", and Prime Minister Donald Tusk hints at a Russian show of force aimed at the British-French led exercise Koalicja 2026, part of the Coalition of the Willing, rather than strayed ordnance.
November 21, 2026	Finland	Russia	2026 drone incursions into the Baltic states and Finland: Finnish Minister of Defense, Antti Hakkanen, reported that a Russian helicopter is suspected of violating Finland's airspace off the town of Loviisa. The incursion seems to be related to the rescue operations carried out by Finnish forces after a Russian flagged transport ship was damaged by aerial drones in the Gulf of Finland.

== See also ==
- Aerial warfare in the Russo-Ukrainian war
- Russian hybrid warfare
- Russian sabotage operations in Europe
- Swedish submarine incidents
- Nord Stream pipelines sabotage
- 2023 Black Sea drone incident
- 2024 Baltic Sea submarine cable disruptions
- Incendiary incidents in Europe 2024
- 2025 Russian railway sabotage in Poland
