= 2026 drone incursions into the Baltic states and Finland =

Violation of Baltic states airspace by drones

- Part of the violations of non-combatant airspace during the Russo-Ukrainian war (2022–present)
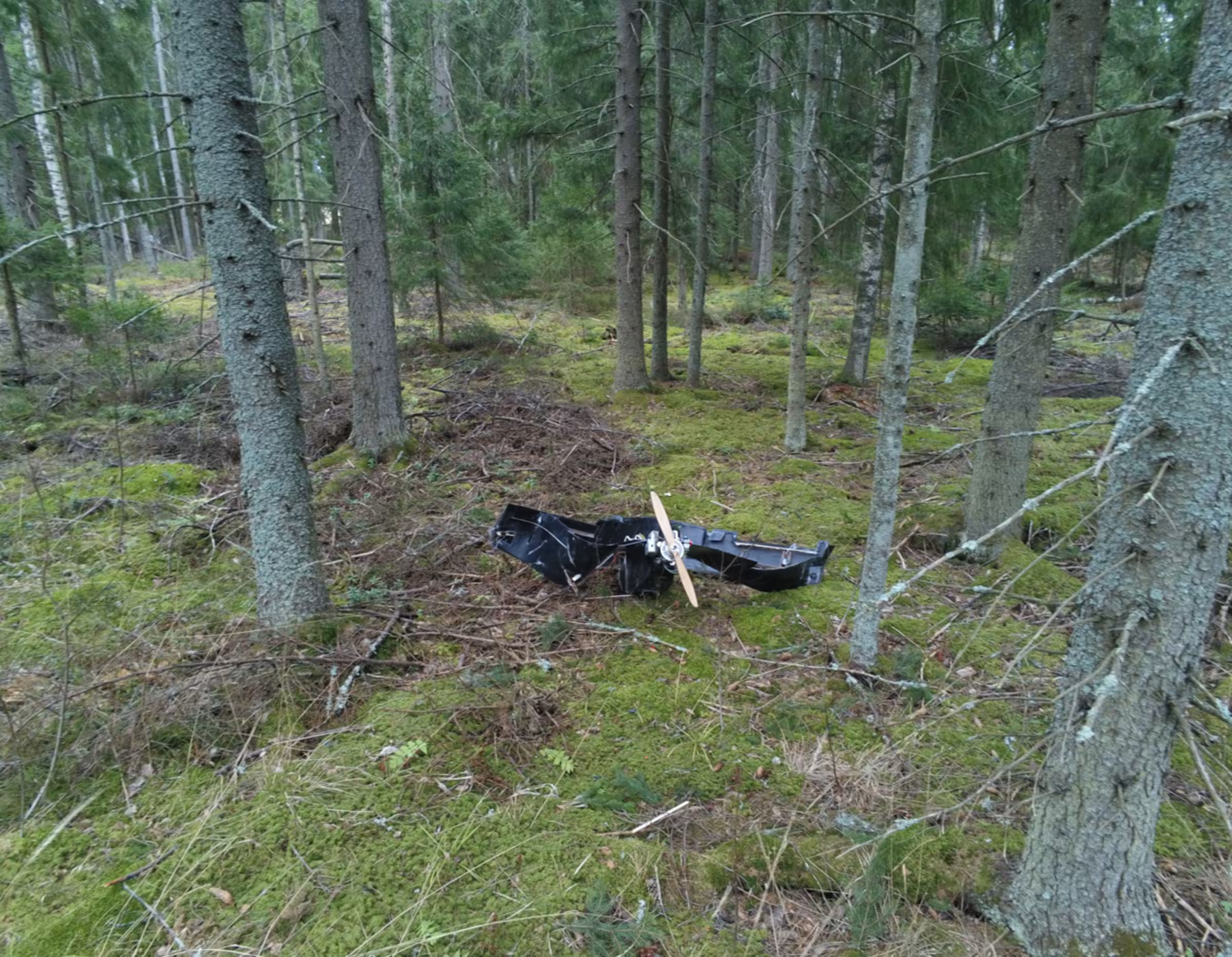
- Remains of an An-196 Liutyi drone in Kouvola, Finland on 29 March
Date	23 March 2026 – present
Location	Lithuania, Latvia, Estonia and Finland
Result	Several Ukrainian or suspected Ukrainian drones crashed in NATO airspace after crossing from Russia

Belligerents
Ukraine	Russia	NATO; Estonia; Finland; Latvia; Lithuania; Romania (Note: The Romanian Air Force shot down a suspected Ukrainian drone over Estonia on 19 May.); France (Note: The French Air and Space Force shot down a suspected Ukrainian drone over Latvia on 8 June.); Italy (Note: The Italian Air Force shot down a suspected Ukrainian drone over Latvia on 14 August and Russian drone over Lithuania on 15 September.)

Casualties and losses
3 drones shot down	1 drone shot down	1 power station damaged 1 oil storage facility damaged

In March and May 2026, several Ukrainian or suspected Ukrainian military drones entered the airspace of NATO member states in the Baltic region, including the Baltic states and Finland, after crossing from Russia during Ukrainian long-range attacks on Russian targets in the Baltic Sea region. The incidents occurred during a wider Ukrainian campaign against Russian oil export infrastructure, including repeated drone strikes on the ports of Ust-Luga and Primorsk. Additionally, Russian drones have also crashed into NATO territory. The first such incident took place in Finland, where a Russian civilian-type Geoscan 701 surveillance drone was discovered in September 2026.

The first known incident in the series was reported in Lithuania on 23 March, followed by further crashes in Latvia and Estonia on 25 March. On 7 May, two suspected stray Ukrainian drones entered Latvia from Russia, one of them exploding at an oil storage facility in Rēzekne. The Baltic governments treated the incursions as security incidents linked to Russia's war against Ukraine, while rejecting Russian accusations that their territories or airspace had been used for Ukrainian attacks on Russia.

Several sources, among them Finnish Prime Minister Petteri Orpo, claim that the drones were presumably driven off course into NATO countries by Russian electronic jamming.

== Background ==
In March 2026, Ukraine intensified long-range drone attacks on Russian oil refineries and export infrastructure. Reuters reported that the attacks on Ust-Luga and Primorsk, two major Russian export terminals on the Baltic Sea, were among the largest Ukrainian strikes on Russian oil export facilities during the war. On 25 March, the ports suspended crude oil and oil product loadings after drone attacks caused fires, with smoke visible from Finland.

Ukraine's Security Service of Ukraine (SBU) said its drones had struck targets in Ust-Luga, damaging oil loading stands and a tank park containing crude oil and petroleum products. Reuters reported that Ust-Luga and Primorsk had briefly resumed exports after earlier attacks before the 25 March strikes again disrupted operations.

On 31 March, Reuters reported that Ukrainian drones had struck Ust-Luga for the fifth time in ten days, with industry sources saying that Transneft crude oil loading facilities had been hit. Authorities said the port had been attacked on 22, 25, 27, 29 and 31 March, forcing suspensions of export operations.

== March incursions ==
=== Lithuania ===
On 23 March 2026, a Ukrainian drone crashed near Lake Lavysas in the Varėna district of Lithuania. The Centre for Eastern Studies reported that the drone likely veered off course during an attack on the Russian oil terminal in Primorsk, possibly as a result of Russian electronic warfare measures. Reuters reported on 25 March that the Lithuanian incident had preceded the crashes in Latvia and Estonia.

=== Latvia and Estonia ===
On 25 March, two Ukrainian military drones entered the airspace of Latvia and Estonia from Russia. According to Reuters, the drones were believed by Latvian and Estonian authorities to have been part of a wider Ukrainian attack on Russia and landed around the same time that Russian officials reported a Ukrainian drone strike on oil facilities at Ust-Luga and Primorsk.

In Estonia, one drone struck the chimney of the Auvere power station, about 2 km from the Russian border. The Estonian government said there were no injuries and no damage affecting the station's operation. According to the Centre for Eastern Studies, the incident did not disrupt energy transmission, and the intended target may have been Ust-Luga.

In Latvia, a drone crashed in the village of Dobročina in Krāslava Municipality. The Centre for Eastern Studies said the Latvian and Estonian incidents were likely caused by similar factors and that the drones may also have been intended for Ust-Luga.

On 31 March, Estonia and Latvia detected foreign drone activity near their borders with Russia. Reuters reported that the incidents occurred as further drone activity unsettled NATO's eastern flank, while Finnish border guards also found a drone near Finland's border.

=== Finland ===
On 29 March 2026, Finnish authorities reported a suspected territorial violation by unmanned aerial vehicles in the southeast of the country. The Finnish Air Force identified one of the drones as a Ukrainian AN-196, while two drones fell in eastern Finland near Kouvola.

The following day, Reuters reported that the Ukrainian drone found north of Kouvola had carried an unexploded warhead, which Finnish authorities destroyed in a controlled detonation. Ukraine apologised for the incident and said that no Ukrainian drones had been directed towards Finland, attributing the deviation to likely Russian electronic interference.

== May incursions ==
=== Finland ===
A further suspected airspace violation was reported in southeastern Finland on 3 May, when an unmanned aerial vehicle was observed near Virolahti and left Finnish airspace towards Russia. Finnish public broadcaster Yle said the incident occurred as Ukraine attacked the Russian oil port of Primorsk, although the drone's model and origin had not initially been identified.

=== Latvia ===
On 7 May 2026, two suspected stray Ukrainian drones entered Latvia from Russia and crashed on Latvian territory. Latvian Defence Minister Andris Sprūds said they had probably been launched by Ukraine against targets in Russia and had fallen accidentally on the wrong side of the border.

One drone exploded at an oil storage facility in Rēzekne, about 40 km from the Russian border. Police and firefighters said four empty oil tanks were damaged and possible drone debris was found at the site. No casualties were reported. Latvian Public Media reported that at least one more drone was believed to have crashed on Latvian territory, probably in the Viļāni area west of Rēzekne, and that the total number of drones that may have overflown Latvia had not yet been established.

Latvian authorities issued drone alerts to residents near the Russian border between 4:09 a.m. and 8:51 a.m. local time, asking them to remain indoors. Schools were closed in several municipalities near the border. French military aircraft from NATO's Baltic Air Policing mission were scrambled during the alert. LSM reported that flight restrictions were imposed up to an altitude of about six kilometres in Latvia's eastern border region and were lifted later that day.

Latvian officials said the drones had entered Latvian airspace from Russia, but the origin of the drones had not been definitively confirmed. LSM reported that officials did not rule out several possibilities during the investigation, including that captured Ukrainian drones could have been used by Russia as a provocation.

On 17 May, the Latvian National Armed Forces reported that an unmanned vehicle had entered Latvian airspace near the Russian border, prompting warnings in five border municipalities and the activation of air-defence units and NATO Baltic Air Policing aircraft. The drone later left Latvian territory.

On 19 May, concurrently with the shooting down of a drone in Estonia, a drone entering the Latvian airspace from Russia triggered an air alert in the border region with Russia. Railway traffic was brought to a halt, exams for ninth-grade school students were suspended and shops were closed down. It was unclear whether the drone was the same eventually shot down in Estonia.

On 21 May, Latvia and Lithuania both issued further drone alerts and scrambled NATO fighter jets. Lithuania's military was searching for two drones, while Latvia's armed forces said at least one drone had entered Latvian airspace from Belarus. The Latvian National Armed Forces later said the drone had either left Latvian airspace or crashed at an unknown location, as technical systems had recorded neither its departure nor its crash.

On 23 May, LSM reported that a drone had crashed into Lake Drīdzis in Krāslava Municipality at around 08:00 and detonated on contact with the water. No injuries were reported; police and the National Armed Forces were deployed to inspect the crash site, while the armed forces said their sensors had not detected the drone entering Latvian territory and therefore no mobile warning had been issued.

=== Lithuania ===
On 17 May, Lithuanian authorities reported that a drone had crashed in a field near Samanė village in the Utena district, with initial assessments suggesting that it was a Ukrainian military aircraft. The drone had not been detected by Lithuanian military radar and was reported by local residents; emergency services activated the Skydas response plan and warned the public not to approach the wreckage.

On 20 May, Lithuania issued an air warning after a drone violated the country's airspace, prompting the temporary suspension of air traffic at Vilnius Airport, train services around the capital, and working of supermarkekts. This was the first air raid alarm that was issued after restoration of Lithuania. Lawmakers and ministers in the Lithuanian parliament were moved to an underground shelter, while schools and kindergartens were instructed to take children to shelters; Defence Minister Robertas Kaunas said NATO Air Policing aircraft had been activated to target the drone, which had reportedly entered Lithuania from Latvia before disappearing from radar.

Similar situation happened also one day later, on 21 May. In Utena County, there were issued an air warning alert. Some trains were stopped because of two objects detected by radards. NATO fighter jets were involved in the operation.

In an ancillary incident on 23 May, a homemade drone flying in from Belarus was forced down by Lithuanian border guards in the Šalčininkai District after air force radar flagged the incoming threat. The aerial vehicle, tracking toward the Eišiškės border post, was neutralized by authorities before crashing near the village of Dumblé. Smugglers are heavily suspected of operating the craft. An official report from the State Border Guard Service reveals that authorities have knocked out 18 cargo-bearing drones from Belarus so far in 2026, compared to the 59 cross-border incursions thwarted over the course of 2025.

=== Estonia ===
On 19 May, a Romanian Air Force F-16 fighter jet, operating under NATO's Baltic Air Policing mission, intercepted and destroyed a suspected Ukrainian drone over Estonia. This marks the first time an unmanned aerial vehicle has been downed in Estonian territory by NATO aircraft since the conflict began. The aircraft had crossed into the southeastern region from Russia amidst intense Russian electronic warfare. Although it was tracked by monitoring systems prior to its neutralization, officials waited to act until they could ensure the safety of civilians and local infrastructure. The drone crashed in a field near Kablaküla, Põltsamaa Municipality. Estonia, as well as Latvia, whose airspace was violated by another drone on the same day, put the blame on Russia for the incidents, while conceding that Ukraine has the right to hit targets inside Russia to diminish Russia's ability to wage war.

== June incursions ==
=== Latvia ===
On 8 June, a French Air Force Dassault Rafale fighter, deployed on the Baltic Air Policing mission, intercepted and destroyed a drone above the eastern village of Berzgale. While the Latvian military refrained from identifying the drone's exact origin, they noted it had crossed into Latvian airspace from Russia due to Russian electronic warfare interference.

== August incursions ==
=== Latvia ===
Aircraft from NATO's Baltic Air Policing patrol shot down a "foreign drone" on 14 August over eastern Latvia. Two Italian Eurofighter aircraft took off to face the threat from Šiauliai, Lithuania, supported by two Turkish F-16s from Ämari, Estonia. The UAV was eventually shot down by an Italian fighter over the village of Rugaji, in Balvi Municipality. Finland simultaneously limited air traffic over the eastern part of the Gulf of Finland during this incident. According to Latvian military sources, the drone entered Latvian airspace as a consequence of Russian electronic warfare.

== September incursions ==
=== Finland ===
On 2 September, a drone was discovered on the shores near the city of Porvoo, southern Finland. Two days later, the Finnish Border Guard announced that the drone was a Russian-made Geoscan 701. According to Finnish Defense Minister Antti Häkkänen, Russia had notified the country about the loose drone a few days before it was found. He also added that the drone is primarily used by civilians.

=== Lithuania ===
A Russian drone from Belarus was shot down by a NATO Italian Eurofighter Typhoon jet over the village of Pratkunai, near Kaunas. A drone warning was previously broadcast for the capital, Vilnius, and the nearby area. President Gitanas Nausėda later confirmed the drone was a Gerbera-2 targeted at Ukraine.

== November incursions ==
=== 11 November 2026 ===
Baltic Airspace incidents - 11 November 2026

On 11 November 2026, amid a Ukrainian drone attack on the Baltic port of Ust-Luga in Russia, air alerts were raised across the Baltic States, with NATO Baltic Air Defence jets scrambled.

In Estonia, air threat alerts were raised in Lääne-Viru, Ida-Viru, Jõgeva, Viljandi, Tartu, Valga, Põlva and Võru counties. Defence Minister Martin Herem reported at least one drone had briefly entered Estonian airspace from the direction of Latvia, before continuing towards Russia. Several drones additionally briefly entered Estonian airspace in the Gulf of Finland.

In Latvia, yellow and orange warnings were raised in Ludza, Krāslava, Augšdaugava, Balvi, Aizkraukle, Jēkabpils, Madona, Cēsis, Smiltene and Gulbene municipalities.

In Lithuania, warnings were received about possible weather balloons and/or drones, resulting in temporary closures to airports in Vilnius and Kaunas. Further disruptions occurred with the detection of drones. During the second incident, a drone was believed to have entered Lithuania from Belarus in the direction of Druskininkai, flying through Marijampolė, Kaunas, Panevėžys, and Pasvalys, before entering Latvian airspace. Baltic Air Defence jets had attempted to shoot a drone down in the vicinity of Biržai. Three additional drones had been directed in the direction of Belarus, but none entered Lithuanian airspace. Air alerts were raised in Radviliškis and Lazdijai.

=== 21 November 2026 ===
Alexander Stubb
(@alexstubb)
tweeted:

The events aboard the Sparta II in the Gulf of Finland are serious.

I have been in close contact with Finland’s foreign and security policy leadership, the Finnish Defence Forces and the Border Guard, and have informed our key partners and allies of what has happened. I thank our authorities for their professional and decisive action.

Finland’s security is being safeguarded.

22 November 2026

On 21 November 2026, air alerts were raised in the area of the Baltic Sea by Finland and Estonia amid a Ukrainian drone attack. Estonian Defence Forces raised a drone alert for Lääne-Viru County and Ida-Viru County, resulting in the scrambling of Turkish Baltic Air Defence F-16 fighter jets. Temporary aviation restrictions were also imposed in Finnish airspace south of Kotka. Shortly after, Finnish and Estonian officials reported that the Russian merchant cargo vessel MV Sparta II bound for Kaliningrad had been damaged by Ukrainian drones. The incident was confirmed by the Russian Governor of Leningrad Oblast Alexander Drozdenko, who stated that the ship had been attacked by two UAVs in the international corridor of the Gulf of Finland, near Loviisa. According to the Finnish Border Guard, the damaged vessel had drifted into Finnish territorial waters following the attack.

Later in the day, the Finnish Ministry of Defence reported that a Russian helicopter had entered its airspace. In total, a number of Russian, Finnish and Estonian vessels and aircraft rendered assistance to the stricken vessel. Finnish authorities reported that the ship would be towed out of its territorial waters and returned to Russia, and an exclusion zone had been set up surrounding the ship.

Finnish authorities stated that the attack had likely been carried out by Ukraine, with Prime Minister Petteri Orpo stating that the conflict was "spilling into our surrounding areas".

Later, Alexey Besprozvannykh, the governor of the Russian exclave of Kaliningrad Oblast, reported that an air raid alert had been raised in Nemansky District, from the direction of Lithuania.

== Reactions ==
The Centre for Eastern Studies wrote after the March incidents that the governments of the Baltic states were emphasising Russia's responsibility as the aggressor rather than blaming Ukraine, which they viewed as acting in self-defence. It also said the incidents were prompting Lithuania, Latvia and Estonia to strengthen their ability to detect and counter foreign unmanned aerial vehicles.

Finland Prime Minister Petteri Orpo said the incidents appeared to be linked to Ukrainian attacks on Russian targets near Finland and suggested that Russian electronic jamming may have caused the drones to drift into Finnish airspace.

Russian officials also suggested that the Baltic states may have allowed Ukrainian drones to use their airspace for attacks on Russian targets. On 31 March, Kremlin spokesman Dmitry Peskov said Russia would respond if other countries provided their airspace for what he called hostile activity against Russia.

On 10 April, the foreign ministers of Estonia, Latvia and Lithuania issued a joint statement rejecting Russian allegations that the Baltic states had allowed their territory or airspace to be used for Ukrainian drone attacks against Russia. The ministers said the claims were part of a Russian disinformation campaign and stated that the Baltic states had formally refuted the allegations to Russian diplomatic representatives in late March.

Following the 7 May incident, Latvia and Lithuania called on NATO to strengthen air defence in the Baltic region. Sprūds said that Baltic airspace was shared NATO airspace and that military units were needed in the region. Lithuanian Defence Minister Robertas Kaunas said NATO should place particular emphasis on strengthening anti-drone defence, saying that drones crashing on NATO territory were a real rather than theoretical threat. The same day, Latvia summoned Russian chargé d'affaires Dmitry Kasatkin and handed him a protest note over the incident. The Foreign Ministry stated that the war in Ukraine was creating security risks for the entire region and reiterated that Latvia had never allowed its airspace to be used for drone strikes against Russian targets. Ukrainian Foreign Minister Andrii Sybiha later stated that Ukrainian drones had entered Latvia as a result of Russian electronic warfare systems.

Latvian Prime Minister Evika Siliņa said that, regardless of the drones' origin, the incident was a consequence of Russia's war against Ukraine and that Latvian society should be prepared for further incidents. She also criticised delays in the issuing of mobile phone warnings and asked the Defence Ministry to clarify the matter. Latvian Defence Minister Andris Sprūds said that he was prepared to take responsibility for the failure to safely shoot down the drones and expressed readiness to resign, subsequently submitting his resignation. Due to Sprūds hailing from a coalition partner party, this dismissal has eventually precipitated the fall of the entire Siliņa cabinet.

According to Lithuanian military specialist Vaidotas Malinionis, Russia is using stray drones as a tool for political leverage against NATO by accusing Baltic states of aiding Ukrainian flight paths. He believes the Russian Army simply interferes with the aircraft via jamming to provoke these incidents, aiming to generate a sense of insecurity and apply pressure on neighboring countries.

On 22 May, the foreign ministers of Denmark, Estonia, Finland, Iceland, Latvia, Lithuania, Norway and Sweden issued a joint statement rejecting Russian and Belarusian allegations concerning airspace violations in the Nordic and Baltic region and condemning Russian threats to use force against Latvia and other regional states. The ministers described the incursions as a direct consequence of Russia's invasion of Ukraine and said Moscow was seeking to intimidate NATO allies.

== See also ==
- 2025 Russian drone incursion into Poland
- 2026 drone incidents in Romania
- 2026 Leipzig Airport drone attack
- Øresund drone incident
