= Kiwala =

Kiwala could refer to:

- Andrzej Kiwala, Polish film technician, winner of the 2009 Amanda Committee's Golden Clapper; see List of Amanda Award winners
- Kazimierz Kiwała, Polish fighter in World War II
- Kinga Kiwała, Polish philosopher
- Kiwala (hill), a hill in Uganda
- Pushpa (ship), crude oil tanker
- Sophie Kiwala, Canadian politician
