= Zamość, Kuyavian-Pomeranian Voivodeship =

Zamość
- Village
- Location within Poland
- Coordinates: 53°4′20″N 17°48′37″E
- Country: Poland
- Voivodeship: Kuyavian-Pomeranian
- County: Nakło
- Gmina: Szubin
- Population: 1,083

Zamość (Polish pronunciation: [ˈzamɔɕt͡ɕ]) is a village in the administrative district of Gmina Szubin, within Nakło County, Kuyavian-Pomeranian Voivodeship, in north-central Poland.

A Kh-55 missile with a ballast warhead, launched over Belarus on 16 December 2022, diverted course and fell in Poland, in a forest in Zamość 15 km west of Bydgoszcz (NATO Joint Force Training Centre headquarter) after having crossed around 500 km of Polish territory. According to Polish PM Mateusz Morawiecki, it was detected by Polish and allied radars, however the missile was accidentally found only on 22 April 2023 and the incident was revealed a couple of days later. It is not clear, if its fall in Poland, near aviation repair works in Bydgoszcz, engaged in military aid for Ukraine, was caused by a technical failure of an old missile, or was a provocation.

== See also ==
- Violations of non-combatant airspaces during the Russian invasion of Ukraine
  - 2022 Ukrainian missile explosion in Poland
  - 2025 Russian drone incursion into Poland
