= Pushpa (ship) =

Ship built in 2007

History

Benin
- Name: Boracay (current); Kiwala; Pushpa; Varuna; Odysseus; P. Fos; Virgo Sun; Pacific Apollo
- Owner: Baaj Shipping Ltd (since March 14, 2025)
- Identification: IMO number: 9332810

Pushpa, also known as Boracay, Kiwala, Varuna, and P. Fos (IMO number: 9332810), is a crude oil tanker built in 2007. The ship claims to be sailing under the flag of Benin, although the flag status is recorded as FALSE in the International Maritime Organization's database GISIS. The vessel was first registered in March 2007 with a gross tonnage of 59,164, and is 244 meters long and 42 meters wide.

Alleged to be a part of Russia's shadow fleet, the European Union, Canada, Switzerland, New Zealand, and the UK have placed sanctions on the ship, according to OpenSanctions. The United Nations have not placed any sanctions on the ship.

== Detention ==
In September 2025, the ship was suspected to have played a part in the launching of drones in Danish airspace, leading to delays and flight cancellations at Danish airports.

On September 28, French authorities boarded the vessel. Ambassador of Russia to Denmark, Vladimir Barbin, has dismissed the possibility of Russian involvement in the drone incidents, which are described as "hybrid attacks" by Danish authorities and prime minister Mette Frederiksen.

On October 2, the tanker left a port in western France.
