= Øresund drone incident =

Russian-Sweden military interaction

Coordinates: 55°36′27″N 12°51′39″E

Öresund drone incident
- Part of the violations of non-combatant airspace during the Russo-Ukrainian war (2022–present)
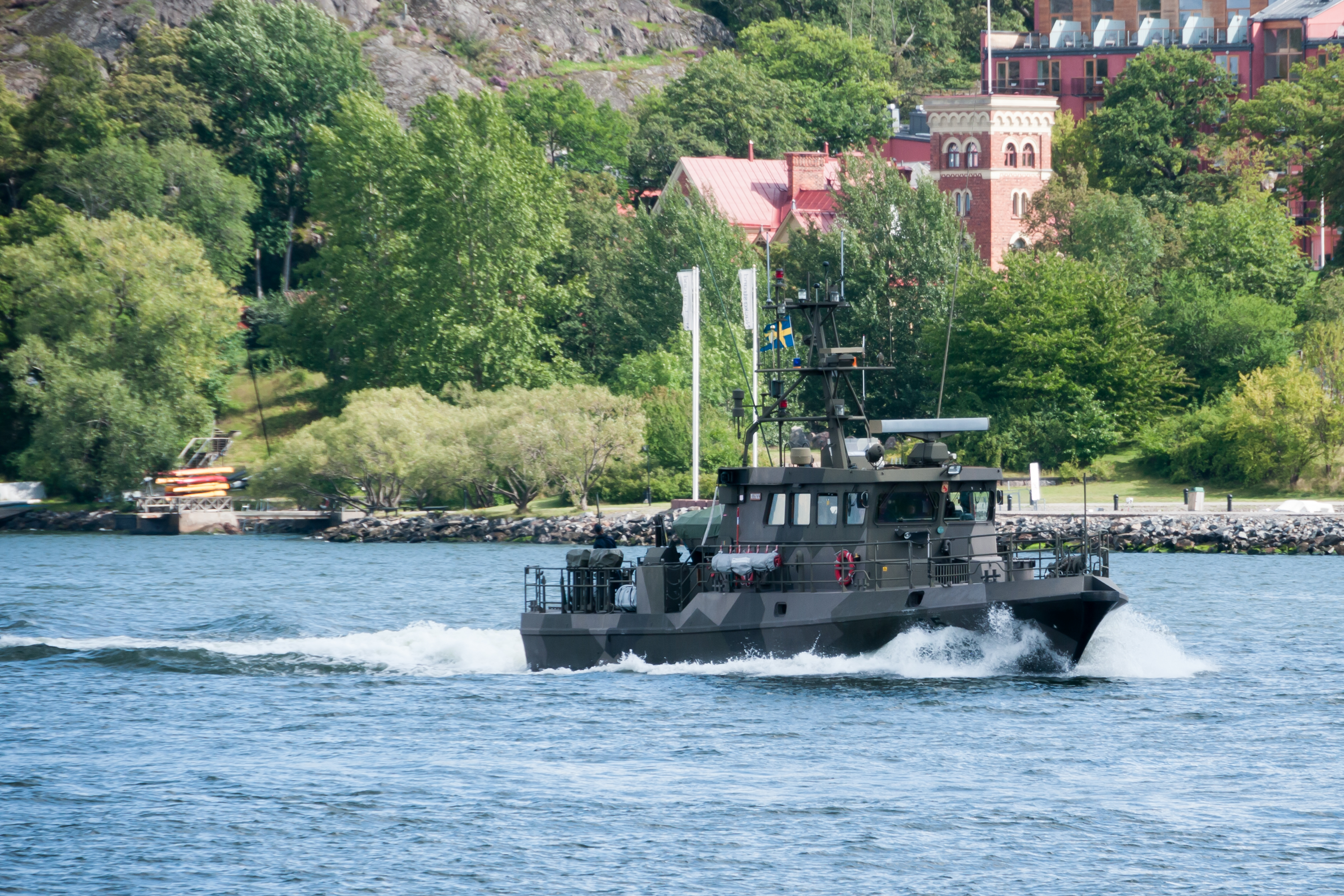
- A Tapper-class patrol boat
Date	26 February 2026
Location	Öresund
Result	Swedish victory • Russian recce mission disrupted

Belligerents
Sweden	Russia

Strength
1 patrol boat	1 ELINT vessel 1 unmanned aerial vehicle

Casualties and losses
None	One drone neutralized

On 26 February 2026, the Swedish Navy patrol boat HSwMS Rapp spotted an unmanned aerial vehicle launched from the Russian Baltic Fleet's intelligence-gathering vessel Zhigulevsk, which had been tracked by the Swedish ship while sailing on the Öresund. The drone was approaching the port of Malmö, where the nuclear powered French aircraft carrier Charles de Gaulle was at anchor at the time. The Swedish naval vessel jammed the drone, disrupting its flight pass and causing it to fade out from the radar, either flying back to the Russian ship or crashing into the sea.

== Background ==
Russian military or intelligence services are accused by Western governments and intelligence agencies of systematic covert attacks on European infrastructure since the late 2010s, intensifying after the 2022 invasion of Ukraine. The operations include arson, assassination attempts, railway damage, vandalism and electronic interference such as GPS jamming as part of a hybrid war across Europe aimed at destabilizing countries that support Ukraine. Officials report that the number of suspected Russian sabotage incidents increased in 2023–2024, targeting critical infrastructure including gas pipelines and communication cables. As part of this strategy, Russia has violated the airspace of NATO members 18 times during 2025 alone using drones, aircraft and missiles. Notable incursions involve a Russian UAV that traveled roughly 100 kilometres (62 mi) into Poland undetected by radar before going down near Osiny. Similarly, another drone spent four hours navigating through several Romanian districts before eventually crashing in Vaslui. Furthermore, a significant wave of 21 drones over Poland on 9–10 September disrupted commercial aviation, resulting in the temporary shutdown of major airports in Warsaw, Rzeszów, and Lublin. Up to four drones were shot down by NATO fighters.

== The action ==
The nuclear powered French aircraft carrier Charles de Gaulle departed from the naval base of Toulon on 27 January for Malmö to take part of the multinational exercise "Lafayette 26", a NATO mission aimed to improve deterrence capabilities, defend Europe's borders and strengthen maritime security in the North Atlantic and the Mediterranean. The French carrier made a stopover regarded as "historic" by the Swedish Armed Forces, since it was the first time a French flagship docked in the port, reinforcing links between France and the newest Nordic NATO members.

After its arrival, the aircraft carrier was protected by an integrated security perimeter. On 26 February, as part of the defensive detail, the Swedish patrol boat HSwMS Rapp spotted the Russian signals intelligence ship Zhigulevsk entering Swedish territorial waters while patrolling the Öresund Strait. Zhigulevsk is a Project 503R surveillance vessel, belonging to the 72nd Separate Division of Special Purpose Ships of the Baltic Fleet Intelligence Center, usually on station in Baltic waters. The Russian trawler was not initially challenged as it was exercising its right of free passage.

Shortly after, Rapp's sensors detected the launch of an unmanned aerial vehicle, and, once it was determined it was flying without authorisation, the Swedish vessel used its electronic warfare equipment to neutralize the drone. The drone was presumably a fixed-wing Orlan-10. The interception took place between 9.7 kilometres (6 mi) to 11 kilometres (7 mi) away from Charles De Gaulle, moored at Malmö. The drone eventually disappeared from radar, presumably either flying back to the Russian ship or sent crashing into the waters after being jammed. Rapp shadowed Zhigulevsk out of Swedish territorial waters into the Baltic Sea. According to French military spokesman Guillaume Vernet, the security system "showed it is robust, and this event had no impact on the activity of the aircraft carrier battle group". The incident was notwithstanding classified as a "serious security alert" by the authorities as the Russian ship violated maritime laws regarding Swedish passage.

== Aftermath ==
Sweden's Defence Minister Pål Jonson reported that "technical data" confirmed the drone was launched from Zhigulevsk, noting also that the incident "constitutes a breach of Sweden's access regulations and a violation of Swedish airspace". French Foreign Minister Jean-Noël Barrot, while visiting Charles de Gaulle along with Swedish Prime Minister Ulf Kristersson, stated that the security of the aircraft carrier was not compromised, and that the incident was "a ridiculous provocation". Russian government spokesperson Dmitri Peskov said that "it’s quite absurd” to claim that the drone was Russian just because a Russian vessel was nearby. Thomas Nilsson, head of the Swedish military intelligence, had reported a week earlier that Russia was increasing its activities around Swedish territory. Western officials believe the Russian aim is not only to hamper European assistance to Ukraine, but also to identify exposed flanks in NATO defences and force them to divert resources.

This was one of the first instances where Western militaries both identified a drone threat to their facilities in real time and neutralized it before it could reach its target. The shift from using shadow fleet ships to military vessels for drone launches highlights an escalation in Russian provocations. Ultimately, these activities serve as a key indicator of potential military preparation against European NATO members.

== See also ==
- Violations of non-combatant airspace during the Russo-Ukrainian war (2022–present)
- 2025 Russian drone incursion into Poland
- 2026 Ukrainian drone incursions into Baltic States
- 2026 drone incidents in Romania
- 2026 Leipzig Airport drone incidents
