= 2022 missile explosion in Poland =

2022 explosions in Poland

- Part of the violations of non-combatant airspace during the Russo-Ukrainian war (2022–present)
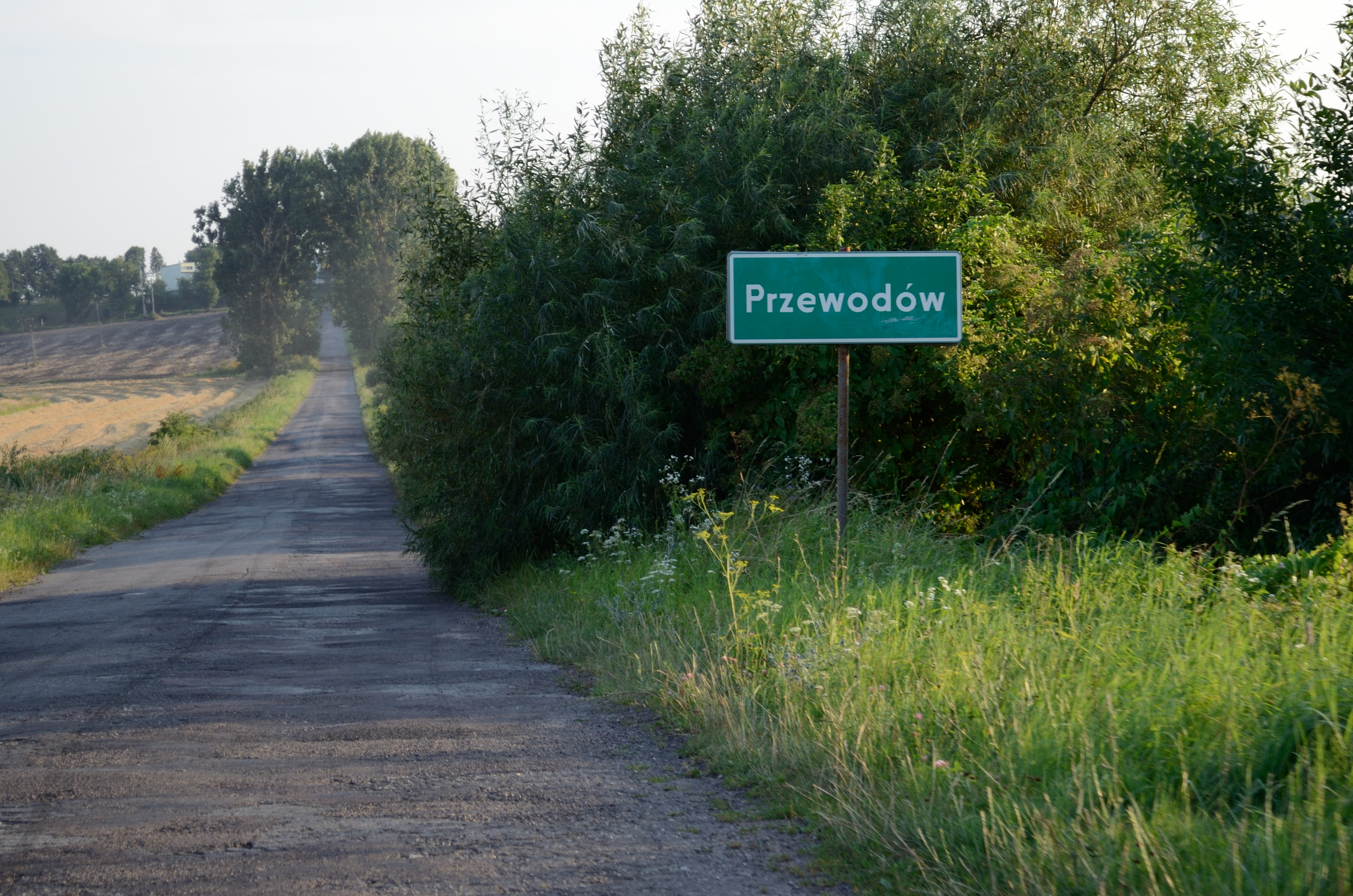
- Przewodów, the village where the explosion occurred
- Location: 50°28′28.5″N 23°55′22.9″E; Village Przewodów, Gmina Dołhobyczów of Hrubieszów County in Lublin Voivodeship, Poland
- Date: 15 November 2022; ~15:40 (UTC+1)
- Attack type: Missile
- Deaths: 2 (Bogusław Wos and Bogdan Ciupek)

On 15 November 2022, a Ukrainian S-300 air defense missile struck Polish territory, in the village of Przewodów near the border with Ukraine, killing two people. The incident occurred during attacks on Ukrainian civilian infrastructure by Russia. It was the first incident of a foreign missile (as opposed to prior UAV incursion) hitting NATO territory during the Russian invasion of Ukraine. Initially Ukraine accused Russia of striking Poland, while the United States claimed that the missile was likely to have been an air defence missile fired by Ukrainian forces at an incoming Russian missile. This was later confirmed in September 2023 by the Polish Prosecutor's Office, which stated that the explosion was caused by an out of control air-defence Ukrainian S-300 missile.

== Background ==
The explosion happened on a day when the Russian military extensively bombarded infrastructure all over Ukraine, the largest-scale attack so far. According to the Ukrainian Air Force Command, the Russian military launched 96 pieces of various types of weapons at Ukraine on 15 November. These included air and sea cruise missiles (Kh-555 and Kh-101, and Kalibr), Kh-59 guided missiles, Geran-1 and -2 attack drones, and Orlan-10 and Orion UAVs. According to Forbes, one Kalibr alone costs $6.5 million, and the Kh-101 missile costs $13 million. The Economic Pravda or Epravda (Ukrainian: Економічна правда) calculated that Russia had spent between half a billion and a billion U.S. dollars' worth of weaponry in the 15 November 2022 attack on Ukraine.

== Explosion ==
Polish media reported that two people (Bogusław Wos and Bogdan Ciupek) were killed in an explosion at a grain dryer. Polish officials stated that the cause of the explosion was unknown. Polish radio station Radio ZET reported that two stray rockets fell on the village, causing the explosion, although later reports indicated that there was only one missile. NATO members started to review the evidence soon after the explosion was reported.

== Investigation ==
After the meeting of the Polish National Security Bureau on 15 November, the government spokesman said: "The services will work all night to sort things out".

Conflicting reports emerged regarding the origin and nature of the explosion(s) shortly after the incident. Poland's Ministry of Foreign Affairs stated that the projectile was "Russian-produced". Andrés Gannon, a security expert at the think tank Council on Foreign Relations, speculated that the missiles could be from S-300 systems. S-300s were used by both combatants during the invasion both as surface-to-air and surface-to-surface missiles, primarily by Ukraine and Russia respectively. Mariusz Gierszewski, a Polish reporter for Radio ZET, reported sources claiming the missile was the remains of a downed rocket. U.S. president Joe Biden, speaking from the G20 summit in Bali, said that it was "unlikely" that the missile was fired from Russia.

According to US intelligence officials, initial assessments suggest that the missile was probably launched by Ukrainian forces at an incoming Russian missile.

On 17 November, Head of the Polish International Policy Bureau Jakub Kumoch gave a similar explanation that an air defence missile failed to shoot down the Russian target it sought to intercept; then "[t]he self-destruct system did not work, and this missile led to a tragedy."

Also on 17 November, Polish officials stated that Ukrainian investigators were likely to be granted access to the site of the explosion.

On 21 November, it was reported that Ukraine will not be granted access to the investigation by the Polish prosecutor's office.

On 26 September 2023, Rzeczpospolita reported that Ukrainian state did not cooperate in the investigation and did not provide any useful material to Poland. The Polish Prosecutor's Office stated that the air-defence missile S-300 5-W-55, fired by the Ukrainian army, went out of control and hit Polish territory.

== Reactions ==
=== Poland ===
After the explosion, Prime Minister of Poland Mateusz Morawiecki called an urgent meeting of a committee for national security and defence affairs. A government spokesperson said that Poland was raising the alert level of some of its military units after the conclusion of the meeting. He also stated that Polish President Andrzej Duda spoke to Secretary General of NATO Jens Stoltenberg regarding the possibility of activating Article 4 of the NATO charter.

The same day, Polish foreign minister Zbigniew Rau reportedly summoned the Russian ambassador and demanded "immediate detailed explanations".

Polish president Andrzej Duda stated late on 15 November 2022 local time that there was no evidence of who fired the missile. The next day, Duda described the incident as a "tragic accident", adding that he "understood" Zelenskyy's expressed belief that the crashed missile had been Russian.

On 28 September 2023, two days after the Polish Prosecutor's Office published its results concluding that the explosion had been caused unintentionally by a Ukrainian anti-air defence missile attempting to intercept a Russian missile, Polish Justice Minister Zbigniew Ziobro confirmed these findings, expressing regret over the lack of cooperation from the Ukrainian side in the investigation; nevertheless, the explosion clearly had been an accident.

In a 1 September 2025 interview with journalist Bogdan Rymanowski, Duda (former President of Poland since 6 August 2025), was asked whether Zelenskyy had pressured him to state the missile was Russian, and replied "you could say that", adding that he viewed it as an attempt to involve Poland in the war.

=== International ===
==== Russia ====
The Russian defence ministry denied reports that Russian missiles had hit Poland, labeling it as "deliberate provocation aimed at escalating the situation".

The next day, it said that Russian strikes on Ukraine had been at least 35 kilometres (22 mi) away from the border with Poland, and that photos of the site published in Poland had been "identified by Russian defence industry specialists as elements of an anti-aircraft guided missile of the S-300 air defence system of the Ukrainian air force". Later that day, the Russian foreign ministry summoned the Polish ambassador.

==== Ukraine ====
President Volodymyr Zelenskyy blamed Russia for the incident in his nightly video address that day, saying that "Russian missiles hit Poland" and describing it as an infringement upon "collective security" and as a "significant escalation". Around the same time, foreign minister Dmytro Kuleba labeled the suggestion of the missile being fired by Ukrainian air defense as a "conspiracy theory" promoted by Russia.

The next day, Ukraine's presidential adviser Mykhailo Podolyak had tweeted that European countries should "close the sky" over Ukraine after the blast. Oleksiy Danilov, the secretary of the National Security and Defense Council of Ukraine, claimed that Ukraine had evidence of a "Russian trace" in the explosion, without giving any details. Zelenskyy also said that he had "no doubt that it was not our missile" and that Ukraine should be given access to the site of the explosion.

On 17 November, Zelenskyy said: "I don't know what happened. We don't know for sure. The world does not know. But I am sure that there was a Russian missile, I am sure that we fired from air defense systems".

==== NATO officials and member countries ====
Rather than making accusations and hasty decisions, Polish civil and military authorities took the time to find out what exactly happened. Then they aligned their collective response with their NATO allies. After the Polish authorities completed their investigation, the North Atlantic Council held an emergency meeting. There, the NATO member states concluded there was no indication this had been a deliberate attack by Russia. A Ukrainian air defence missile, fired to defend Ukrainian territory, had somehow veered off course. Nevertheless, NATO Secretary General Stoltenberg made crystal clear that this accident was not Ukraine's fault, and that Russia bore the ultimate responsibility for this tragic loss of human life.

— Rob Bauer (Chair of the NATO Military Committee, 2021–2025)

Due to this incident, compounded with the closure of the Druzhba pipeline, the Hungarian government led by Prime Minister Viktor Orbán also called an emergency meeting with its Defence Council on the same night, and Defense Minister Kristóf Szalay-Bobrovniczky had a telephone conversation with NATO Secretary General Jens Stoltenberg.

Shortly after the alleged strike, the United States Department of Defense acknowledged reports that two Russian missiles struck a location inside Poland near its Ukrainian border, though it could not confirm them. Bob Menendez, Senate Foreign Relations Chair, expressed the hope that Russia would "apologize quickly for the loss of life and express that it wasn't intentional", and warned of "all sorts of consequences", including the possibility of invoking Article 5, if the strike was intentional.

Poland requested a NATO meeting on Wednesday, 16 November, on the basis of Article 4. NATO diplomats said that the alliance would act cautiously and needed time to verify exactly how the incident happened.

Estonian Minister of Foreign Affairs Urmas Reinsalu responded to the reports by tweeting that Estonia was ready to defend "every inch" of NATO territory. Belgian Prime Minister Alexander De Croo responded to the reports by saying "We stand with Poland." Czech Prime Minister Petr Fiala tweeted that if the strikes were confirmed to be an intentional act, "it would "be a further escalation by Russia." Romanian President Klaus Iohannis tweeted that Romania stands "in full solidarity with our friend and ally Poland" and that "we are in contact with our partners and allies".

Stoltenberg stated that Russia bears the blame, although the missile was most likely a Ukrainian air defense system or missile.

==== Others ====
- President of the European Council Charles Michel stated that he was "shocked" by the reports of the incident, adding that "we stand with Poland", which is a member of the European Union (EU).
- The Ministry of Foreign Affairs and European Integration of Moldova expressed solidarity with Poland after the explosions and said that it was in contact with the Polish authorities. Moldovan foreign minister Nicu Popescu sent to Zbigniew Rau, his Polish counterpart, condolences for the families of the victims. An event similar to the missile strike in Poland had occurred in the Moldovan village of Naslavcea earlier on 31 October, when as a result of another wave of Russian missiles against Ukraine, one of them was taken down by Ukrainian air defence systems and it crashed into the village, causing material damages but no casualties.

== Related incidents ==
On 5 December 2022, as Russia launched a wave of targeted missile strikes against Ukraine, a missile fell within the territory of Moldova, near the city of Briceni. Russian military expert Alexei Leonkov claimed that this and the incident at Przewodów were similar and that the missile in both cases originated from a S-300 missile system. A third missile fell into the Moldovan village of Larga on 14 January 2023 and a fourth missile fell in the same village on 16 February 2023. On 25 September, a missile crashed into Chițcani, for the first time in Moldovan territory controlled by Transnistria. On 11 February 2024, fragments of a Russian drone were found in the Moldovan village of Etulia. This happened again on 17 February in Etulia Nouă and on 4 April again in Etulia.

In April 2023, the wreck of a Russian missile, likely a Kh-55 missile launched over Belarus on 16 December 2022, was discovered in forests near Bydgoszcz in Poland, after having crossed around 500 kilometres (310 mi) of Polish territory.

On 29 December 2023, during that day's bombardment of Ukraine by Russia, a Russian missile travelled through Polish airspace for about 40 kilometres (25 mi) before turning back towards Ukraine.

At 04:23 CET on 24 March 2024, a Russian missile spent 39 seconds passing through Polish airspace, travelling about one to two km in Poland before entering Ukrainian airspace.

== See also ==
- Violations of non-combatant airspaces during the Russian invasion of Ukraine
- 2022 Zagreb Tu-141 crash – Military drone crash in Zagreb, Croatia
