= OpenSanctions =

Financial crime database

OpenSanctions is a database of sanctioned entities, politically exposed persons, and subjects of financial crime enforcement actions, maintained by a company based in Berlin, Germany. It was created in 2015 by Friedrich Lindenberg, while he was building data tools for the Organized Crime and Corruption Reporting Project. The source code is published as open-source software.

The Global Investigative Journalism Network described OpenSanctions as providing "reporters quick access to potential leads on global persons of interest". The database was used by the International Consortium of Investigative Journalists as part of their methodology for the Cyprus Confidential investigation, and is listed in the Bellingcat investigation toolkit.
