= Tapper-class patrol boat =

Swedish Navy class

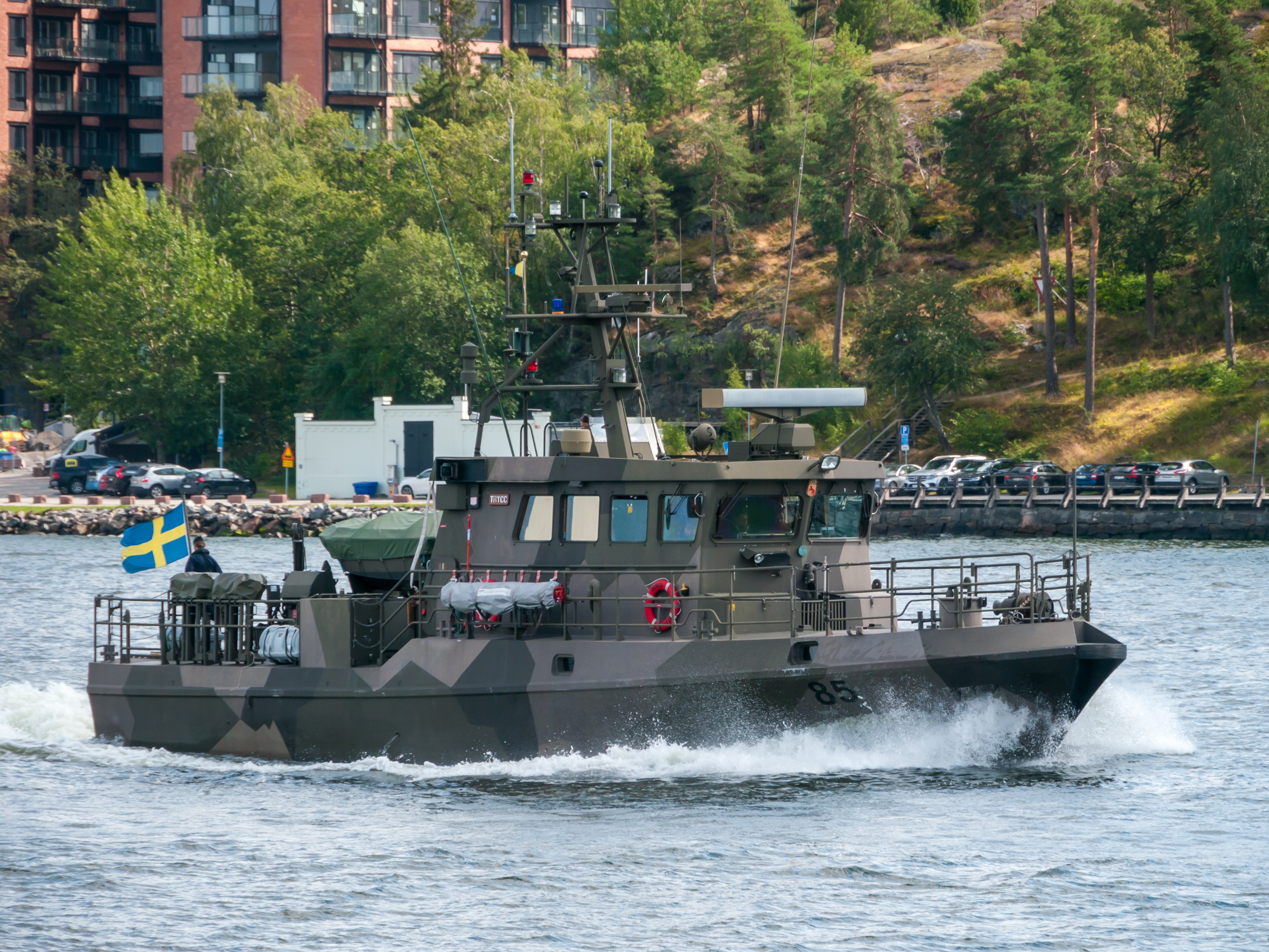
- HMS Trygg at Stockholm

Class overview
- Builders: Djupviks varv
- Operators: Swedish Navy
- In commission: 1993–present
- Planned: 12
- Completed: 12
- Active: 11

General characteristics
- Type: Patrol boat
- Displacement: 62 tons
- Length: 23 m (75 ft 6 in)
- Beam: 5.4 m (17 ft 9 in)
- Draught: 1.9 m (6 ft 3 in)
- Propulsion: 2 diesel engines, 2 × 1,200 hp (890 kW)
- Speed: 25 knots (46 km/h; 29 mph)
- Complement: 8
- Sensors & processing systems: Kongsberg Maritime sonar
- Electronic warfare & decoys: Drone-jamming equipment
- Armament: 2 × 12.7 mm heavy machine guns; Mines and depth charges; 4 Elma ASW-600 anti-submarine rocket launchers

The Tapper class are a class of patrol boats in service with the Swedish Navy since the 1990s (the word tapper means "brave" in Swedish).

== Design ==
Tapper-class boats' first function is to protect and patrol the Swedish coastal waters. Their armament includes two 12.7 mm heavy machine guns, four Elma ASW-600 anti-submarine rockets, six depth charges and naval mines.

Because of their small size of 22 metres (72 ft 2 in) and displacement of 62 tons. these patrol boats can operate in extremely shallow water.

These patrol boats have a crew of eight sailors - consisting of four officers and four ratings. Further, they can accommodate ten passengers.

== History ==
From 1993 to 1999 a total of twelve ships were constructed and entered service with the Swedish Navy and amphibious corps. The class was set to be retired in 2014 but after the Russian intervention in Ukraine and Russian military build-up in the Baltic Sea, it was decided that the boats would remain in service and be modified as well.

In 2020 the first six boats of the class had a comprehensive overhaul and upgrade program in which they were equipped - among other things - with the Kongsberg Maritime sonar for anti-submarine warfare.

== Ships in class ==
Number	Ship name	English translation	Commissioned	Status
PBR81	HSwMS Tapper	"Brave"	1993	Retired in 2011
PBR82	HSwMS Djärv	"Bold"	1993	Active
PBR83	HSwMS Dristig	"Audacious"	1994	Active
PBR84	HSwMS Händig	"Dextrous"	1994	Active
PBR85	HSwMS Trygg	"Dauntless"	1995	Active
PBR86	HSwMS Modig	"Courageous"	1995	Active
PBR87	HSwMS Hurtig	"Smart"	1995	Active
PBR88	HSwMS Rapp	"Quick"	1996	Active
PBR89	HSwMS Stolt	"Proud"	1997	Active
PBR90	HSwMS Ärlig	"Sincere"	1997	Active
PBR91	HSwMS Munter	"Cheerful"	1998	Active
PBR92	HSwMS Orädd	"Fearless"	1999	Active

== See also ==
- MHV900-class patrol boat
- Øresund drone incident
