= Koalicja 2026 =

First joint military exercise of the Multinational Force – Ukraine

- Type: multi-lateral joint forces exercises
- Location: Poland, Romania, Black Sea
- Objective: Deployment of forces, train the Multinational Force – Ukraine (MNF-U), winter training
- Date: 9 November – 22 November 2026
- Executed by: UK, France, Poland and 7 european states and Turkey

Koalicja 2026 (official military designation: KOALICJA 26.2) was the first joint military exercise of the Multinational Force – Ukraine (MNF-U). It is formed by forces of the so-called Coalition of the Willing, the alliance of European states formed to help secure a potential ceasefire or peace agreement in Ukraine.

The exercise will take place from November 9 to 22, 2026 at the Nowa Dęba military training ground in southeastern Poland, with the participation of 11 nations.

On November 20, 2026 the very day when defense ministers of Poland, France, Great Britain, Lithuania, and Estonia were visiting the military exercise, Russian cruise missiles and drones struck near the training grounds in Poland.

== Purpose and Mandate ==
The exercise focused on the formation and operational readiness of the Multinational Force – Ukraine (MNF-U).

Training activities included the rapid deployment of troops by land, sea, and air; the provision of fuel and supplies; air patrols; and mine clearance. In the event of a ceasefire, the force is intended to be stationed in Ukraine at the invitation of the Ukrainian government to support the reconstruction of the Ukrainian armed forces and to help secure the peace.

The maneuver took place explicitly outside of NATO command structures. No offensive combat operations were practiced.

== Exercise ==
The primary focus is on the Nowa Dęba military training ground in southeastern Poland, not far from the Ukrainian border. Concurrently, exercises are taking place in the airspace over Romania and in the western Black Sea.

The maneuver is being jointly led by France and Great Britain, with Poland serving as the host nation and providing logistical support. In total, approximately 2,800 troops supplemented by about 2,000 Polish support personnel from eleven countries are participating:

- Belgium
- Germany; approximately 10 staff officers serving in multinational command staffs, as well as up to two German Air Force Airbus A400M aircraft deployed primarily for air transport and aerial refueling over Romania and the western Black Sea.
- Estonia
- France; a command post in Lyon coordinates the simulated air and naval operations. Command of the land component lies with the 1st Armored Division (1re division blindée). On the ground in Nowa Dęba, the 7th Armored Brigade (7e brigade blindée), led by Brigadier General Maxime Do Tran is conducting the primary training exercises with approximately 700 soldiers, 200 vehicles, and a specialized unit for drone operations and counter-drone defense (comprising about 50 UAVs).

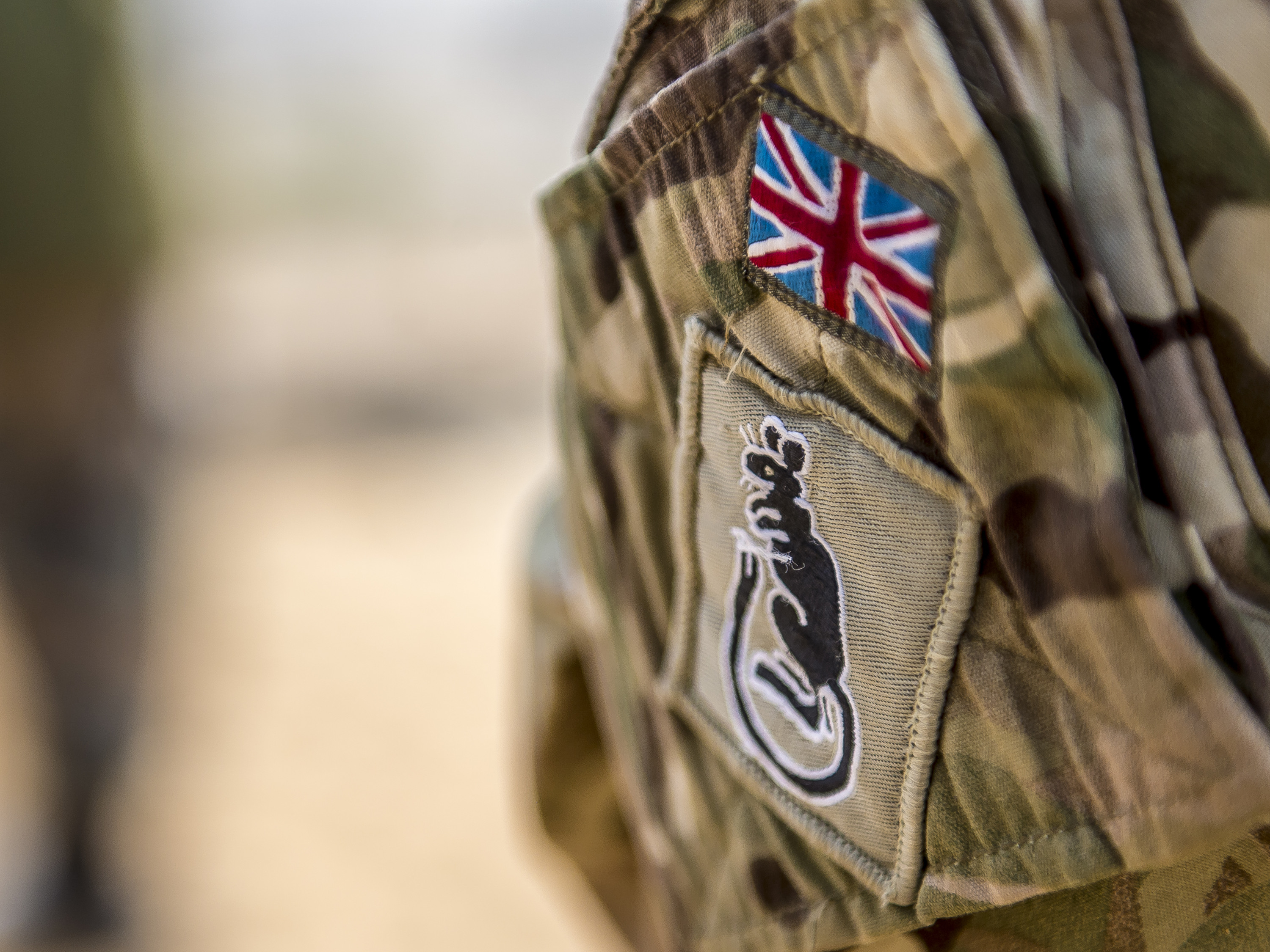
Tactical recognition flash of "Desert Rats", 7th Armoured Brigade of UK

- Great Britain; the core of the British contingent is the 7th Light Mechanised Brigade (“Desert Rats”), commanded by Brigadier James Leask. The Royal Air Force is contributing Eurofighter Typhoon combat aircraft, as well as an RAF Voyager tanker aircraft for in-flight refueling.
- Lithuania, an army sub-unit (infantry/reconnaissance platoon), also under the tactical command of the British brigade.
- the Netherlands
- Poland
- Sweden
- Spain
- Turkey, participates primarily via a maritime command center in Istanbul, from which mine-clearing and naval operations for the Black Sea are coordinated and simulated.

== Political background ==
On November 20, 2026 the very day that the defense ministers of Poland, France, Great Britain, Lithuania, and Estonia were visiting the military exercise in Nowa Dęba debris from Russian cruise missiles and drones struck near the training grounds.

Polish Defense Minister Władysław Kosiniak-Kamysz interpreted this as a deliberate show of force by Russia and a targeted attempt to intimidate and undermine European unity during the exercise.

== See also ==
- Coalition of the willing (Russo-Ukrainian war)
- European Union Advisory Mission Ukraine
- European Union Military Assistance Mission in support of Ukraine
