= Crocmaz =

Crocmaz Крокмаз (Russian) Крокмаз (Ukrainian)
- Village
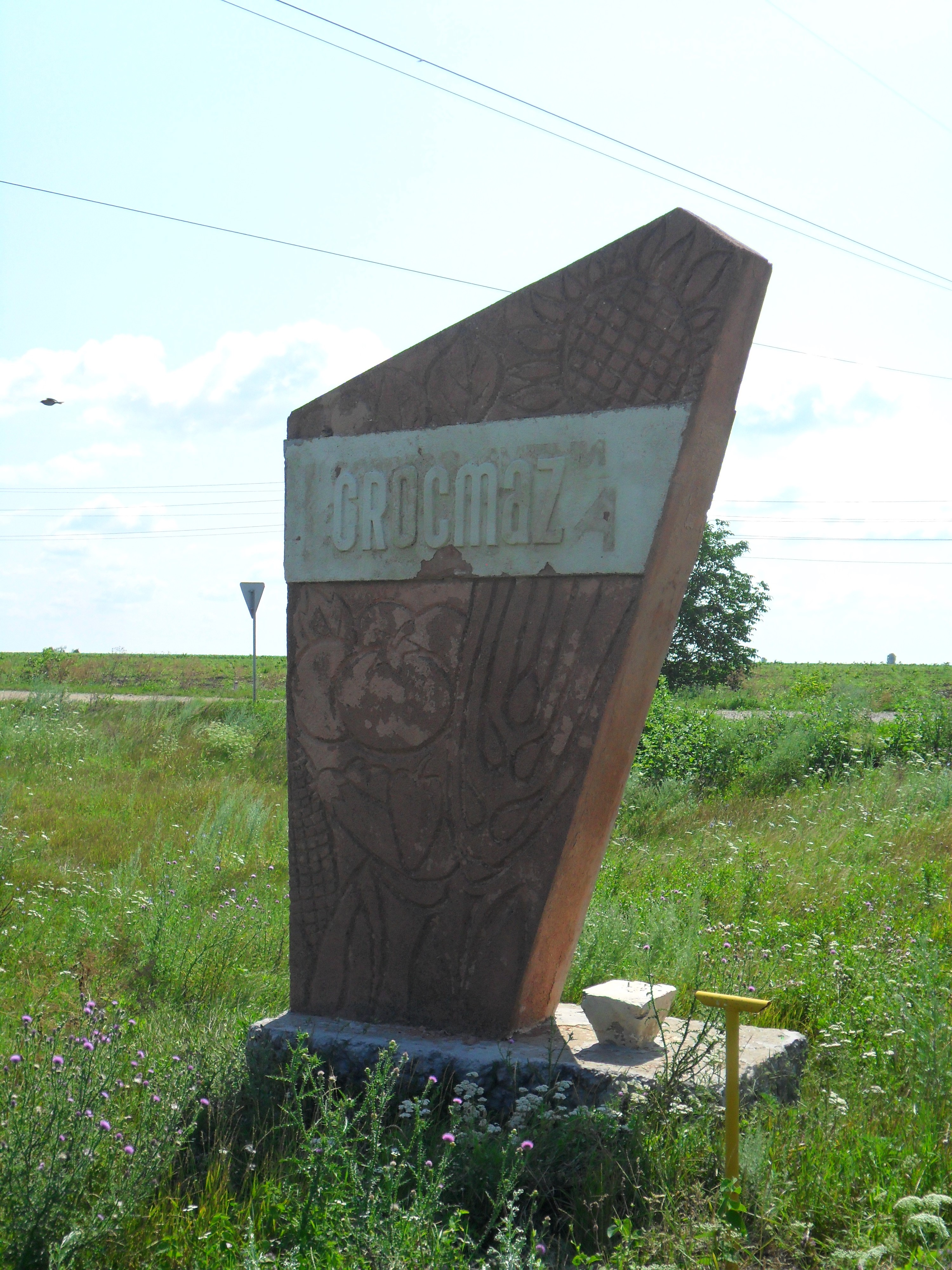

- Location within Moldova
- Coordinates: 46°27′18″N 29°59′09″E
- Country: Moldova

Government
  - Mayor: Ion Veleșco (PLDM)

Area
  - Total: 47.91 km^{2} (18.50 sq mi)
- Elevation: 41 m (135 ft)

Population (2014 census)
  - Total: 2,629
- Time zone: UTC+2 (EET)
  - Summer (DST): UTC+3 (EEST)
- Postal code: MD-4218

Crocmaz is a village in Ștefan Vodă District, Moldova.
