= 2025 European drone sightings =

Sightings of drones near multiple airports in Denmark

- 2025 European drone sightings (Denmark) Reported sites of drone activity and related closures (22–28 September 2025)
- Date: 22–28 September 2025
- Time: Evenings and nights (local) (CEST)
- Duration: Several nights over a 6-day period
- Location: Primarily Denmark
- Type: Disruption of civil aviation and surveillance of military sites by unidentified unmanned aerial vehicles
- Cause: Under investigation
- Motive: Unknown
- Outcome: Undetermined; Temporary shutdown at Copenhagen Airport (near four hours, 22–23 September); NATO increased vigilance/presence in the Baltic Sea region, including deployment of FGS Hamburg in Copenhagen
- Countries and organisations: Denmark; Rigspolitiet (National Police); Danish Defence Command; Norway (Note: Parallel, separate closure at Oslo Airport on 22–23 September.); NATO (Note: Alliance announced increased ISR and naval air-defence presence in the Baltic Sea region.); Sweden (Note: Offered anti-drone equipment support for events in Copenhagen.); Germany (Note: Deployed an air-defence frigate to Copenhagen ahead of EU meetings.); Belgium; Netherlands; Ireland; France

The 2025 European drone sightings are a series of unexplained unmanned aircraft observations reported starting 22 September 2025 over European civilian airports and military installations. All incidents took place in the evening or at night.

The first major incident forced a near four-hour suspension of flights at Copenhagen Airport (CPH) on the evening of 22 September after two to three large drones were repeatedly seen inside controlled airspace; Oslo Gardermoen (OSL) in neighbouring Norway also briefly closed its airspace that night following a separate sighting. Danish authorities characterized the activity as a likely hybrid operation intended to unsettle the public and disrupt critical infrastructure. Prime Minister Mette Frederiksen called the events “the most serious attack on Danish critical infrastructure to date.”

In the following days, Aalborg Airport (AAL), which also hosts a military air base, was twice affected (24–25 and 25–26 September), and police received additional reports near Esbjerg and Sønderborg airports and at Flyvestation Skrydstrup, the main base of Danish F-16 and F-35 jets. The National Operative Staff (NOST), Denmark's central inter-agency crisis management body, escalated to its highest readiness and the Danish National Police raised its nationwide preparedness to heightened readiness (a level not employed since the 2015 Copenhagen terrorist attacks). The Defence Command stated that it supported police with undisclosed counter-UAS measures.

On 27 September, the Defence Command stated that drones had again been observed at several military facilities, and police confirmed activity near Air Base Karup. NATO announced it would increase its presence in the Baltic Sea region, deploying intelligence assets and the FGS Hamburg, an air-defence frigate. As of 28 September 2025, Danish authorities had not publicly identified perpetrators; officials acknowledged they were investigating multiple hypotheses, characterized the operator as a "capable actor" and did not rule out drones being launched from a maritime vessel.

The incidents unfolded while Denmark held the rotating presidency of the Council of the European Union (July–December 2025) and days before an informal European Council meeting in Copenhagen (early October). Authorities imposed a temporary nationwide no-fly zone for drones as a security measure around the summit.

== Events ==
=== 22 September ===
Both Copenhagen and Oslo airports were closed temporarily on 22 September due to drones being sighted near both, causing disruptions lasting into the following day.

Danish Prime Minister Mette Frederiksen said it was "most serious attack so far" on the countries' critical infrastructure, and the government were not ruling out any possibilities.

Copenhagen police Chief Jens Jespersen said "several large drones" had flown over Copenhagen airport Monday evening, forcing a shutdown. Police decided not to shoot down the drones for safety reasons. Jespersen also said that the site the drones were being controlled from was unknown, that it could be kilometres away, possibly "from a ship". He said "[t]he number, size, flight patterns, time over the airport. All this together... indicates that it is a capable actor. Which capable actor, I do not know," and "[i]t was an actor that had the capacity, the will and the tools to make their presence known."

On 25 June 2026, the Copenhagen Police held a press conference where Chief Inspector Søren Thomassen announced the conclusions of their extensive investigation. The Police have been unable to prove or deny that there were drones over Copenhagen Airport on 22 September 2025. Asked about previous statements regarding a hypothetical "capable actor" behind the incident, Søren Thomassen replied that "we were not clear enough with our reservations".

=== 23 September ===
Copenhagen and Oslo airports reopened early on 23 September.

=== 24 September ===
Aalborg and Billund airports closed temporarily due to drone sightings. The Aalborg sighting began at 21:44 CEST. A few minutes later, police received reports of drones near the airports at Sønderborg, Esbjerg and Skrydstrup.

=== 25 September ===
The Billund airport was closed for an hour due to a drone sighing in the early hours of Thursday. By 03:00 CEST, all drones sighted from the previous night to this morning were gone.

During the night of September 25 to 26, drone formations were spotted over critical infrastructure in the northern German state of Schleswig-Holstein. According to an internal government memo, shortly after 9 p.m. on Thursday, September 25, two small drones were initially seen hovering over the premises of Thyssenkrupp's marine division. Shortly thereafter, a “drone formation with a mother drone” was spotted above the University Medical Center Kiel. Later, a large stationary drone and several small flying objects were observed above the Kiel Fjord. The state police observed that the drone formations flew in parallel paths to survey the facilities on the ground, including a power plant and the Schleswig-Holstein state parliament. Large parts of the Kiel Canal were also flown over from east to west. Federal Interior Minister Dobrindt spoke of drones with a wingspan of up to eight meters. On the same day, suspicious drones were sighted over the German Armed Forces base in Sanitz in Mecklenburg-Vorpommern.

=== 26 September ===
Kastrup Airbase was the site of another sighting starting at 20:15 CEST and lasting several hours. Civil airspace above the base was closed briefly, but no civil flights were scheduled. The Danish Defence Ministry said other bases had similar sightings, but did not specify which ones.

=== 27 September ===
Drones were reported to have been seen by police and armed forces within a space of two and a half hours at Norway's Ørland Main Air Station, the main Royal Norwegian Air Force air base, also important for NATO.

=== 28 September ===
Police in Norway reported having captured footage of up to five to six possible drones at the same time hovering over restricted airspace at Brønnøysund Airport.

=== 29 September ===
The Danish Defence Ministry was reported to have begun mobilising reservists, according to leaks given to the press.

=== 2 October ===
Due to drones of unknown origin, flight operations at Munich Airport were suspended for several hours in the evening. Numerous flights were canceled or had to be diverted to neighboring airports such as Nuremberg or Stuttgart. At least 17 flights were grounded and around 3,000 passengers were affected.

Authorities in Belgium were investigating sightings of 15 drones above the Elsenborn military site near the German border. After the sighting, the drones reportedly flew from Belgium to Germany, where they were also observed by the police in the town of Düren.

=== 3 October ===
For the second time in 24 hours, flight operations at Munich Airport had to be suspended due to several drone sightings in the nearby airspace. In a statement on Friday evening, the airport said that flights were stopped at 21:30 local time, with around 6,500 passengers affected.

=== 31 October ===
After sightings of unidentified drones, flights were suspended for almost two hours at Berlin Brandenburg Airport.

=== 2 November ===
German Police stated flight operations were temporarily suspended at Bremen Airport after an unidentified drone was sighted near the area.

Several drones have been observed flying over Kleine Brogel Air Base in Belgium near the Dutch border. A helicopter was deployed to the base after the drones were spotted, and they then flew off towards the Netherlands. Drones were also seen flying over other military air bases, including Leopoldsburg in central Limburg province and Marche-en-Famenne in south-east Belgium.

=== 6 November ===
Drone sightings were reported over Gothenburg-Landvetter International Airport, Sweden, causing flights to be redirected to Copenhagen, Denmark. Brussels International Airport also temporarily closed after drone sightings. Drones were also spotted over Antwerp’s port area

=== 9 November ===
Liège Airport had to close temporarily after several drone sightings. Air traffic at the airport, one of Europe's largest cargo airports, was suspended for just under an hour in the evening.

A total of three drones were spotted above the Doel Nuclear Power Station in Belgium.

The United Kingdom announced it will join France and Germany in sending personnel and equipment to help Belgium counter drone incursions around sensitive sites.

=== 22 November ===
The Dutch Ministry of Defence says the Dutch military opened fire at drones over Volkel Air Base, where nuclear weapons are stored, but that no wreckage was recovered.

=== 1 December ===
During the landing approach of Ukrainian President Zelensky's government plane, which landed at Dublin Airport at around 11 p.m. for his official visit to Ireland, the crew of the Irish naval vessel LÉ William Butler Yeats spotted several unknown drones north of Dublin. The navy observed the large drones flying directly in front of Howth over the Irish Sea.

=== 4 December ===
Five unidentified drones were spotted flying over the Île Longue naval base in France in the evening. This base serves as the operational hub for France's fleet of nuclear-powered ballistic missile submarines. Although soldiers fired a jammer, no drones were shut down and no pilots were identified.

== See also ==
- 2024 drone sightings
- 2025 Russian drone incursion into Poland
- 2026 Leipzig Airport drone incidents
- Russian sabotage in Europe
