= Lake Drīdzis =

Lake in Latvia

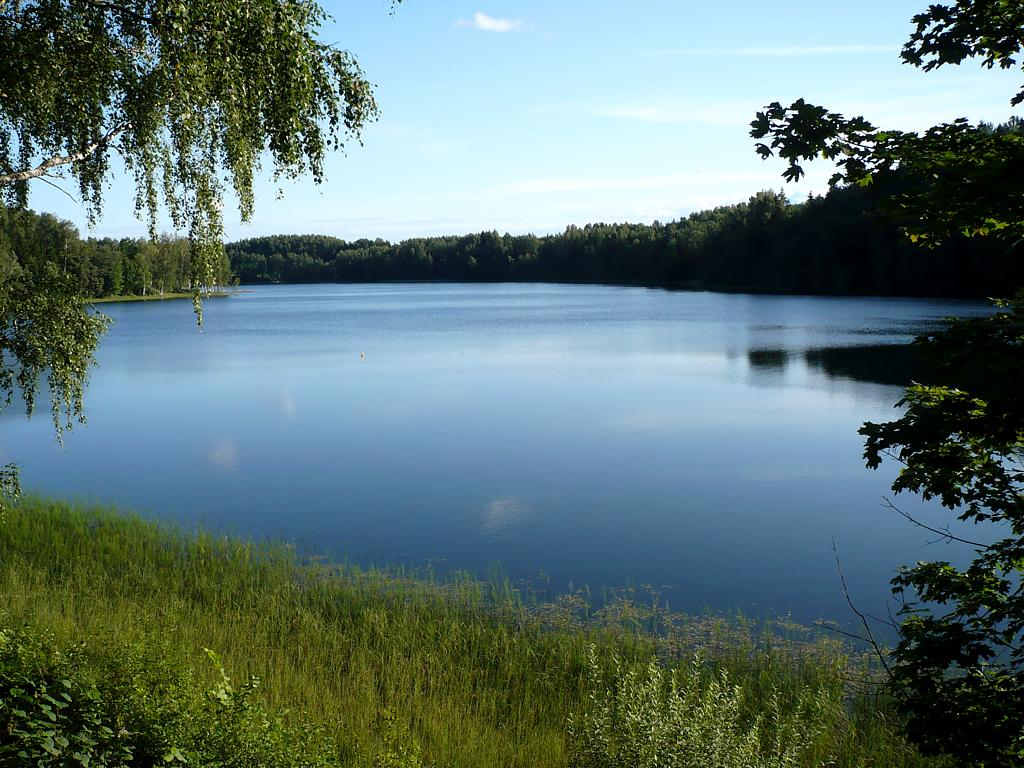

- Location within Latvia
- Location: Krāslava Municipality, Latvia
- Coordinates: 55°58′N 27°16′E
- Primary outflows: Kovšika
- Catchment area: 34 km^{2} (13 sq mi)
- Basin countries: Latvia
- Max. length: 9.8 km (6.1 mi)
- Surface area: 7.532 km^{2} (2.908 sq mi)
- Average depth: 12.8 m (42 ft)
- Max. depth: 66.2 m (217 ft)
- Surface elevation: 159.2 m (522 ft)
- Islands: 9

Lake Drīdzis (Dreidzs in local dialect) is the deepest lake in Latvia, with a maximum depth of 66.2 meters. Its depth was originally measured at 65.1 meters in 1998, but it was measured again at 63.1. However, the University of Daugavpils measured it in 2020 at its final depth of 66.2 meters. The lake's bed is sandy and silty.

The lake is near the Lake Drīdzis Nature Park, which has been protected since 1977.
