= Electronic Warfare Troops of the Russian Federation =

Troops of Electronic Warfare of the Russian Federation
- Войска радиоэлектронной борьбы Вооружённых сил Российской Федерации
- Great emblem of Russian Electronic warfare troops
- Active: 1991-present
- Country: Russia
- Branch: Russian Armed Forces
- Type: Electronic warfare
- Role: Electronic warfare
- Part of: Ministry of Defense
- Engagements: Russo-Ukrainian war

Commanders
- Current commander: Lieutenant General Yuri Illarionovich Lastochkin

Electronic Warfare Troops of the Armed Forces of the Russian Federation is a structural department of electronic warfare (EW) of the special troops of the Armed Forces of the Russian Federation.

Units of the electronic warfare forces carry out measures to gain dominance on the airwaves, protect their military and weapons control systems from deliberate interference by the enemy, as well as disrupt the operation of enemy command and control systems, and reduce the effectiveness of their combat assets.

== History ==
The world's first public mention of electronic warfare dates back to January 1902 in a report by the Russian Maritime Technical Committee. Two years later, the Russian army had to put the new knowledge into practice during the Russo-Japanese War.

During World War I, radio interference was used to disrupt communications between army, corps, and division headquarters, as well as between warships. Conventional radio communications were used to create interference, and only the German army had special radio interference stations.

On December 15, 1942, the first specialized electronic warfare units were created within the Red Army. The reason for their appearance was a memo from Lavrentiy Beria, sent to Stalin.

The first means of radio interference (dipole and angle radio reflectors, training jamming transmitters) of industrial production entered the army use by 1950. During 1950s a special electronic warfare service was being created in the Soviet army.

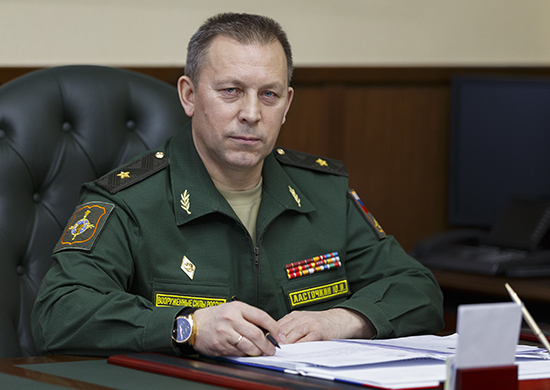
Chief of the Electronic Warfare Troops Lieutenant General Yuri Lastochkin

According to a study by the Royal United Services Institute (RUSI), Russia has increased the effectiveness of its electronic warfare forces during the armed conflict in Ukraine. Its electronic warfare systems were mainly focused on the destruction of unmanned aerial vehicles and were located every ten kilometers of the front. This allowed Russian electronic warfare forces to destroy about 10,000 Ukrainian drones per month. It is also noted that the means of electronic warfare of the Russian Federation, apparently, were able to intercept and decode 256-bit encryption of the enemy's Motorola walkie-talkies.

== Structure ==
The electronic warfare troops of the Armed Forces of the Russian Federation are organizationally composed of formations and military units of Combat arms of the Armed Forces of the Russian Federation, military districts, as well as a set of formations and military units of electronic warfare of central subordination.

== Leadership ==
The central body of EW troops the Office of the Chief of the Electronic Warfare Troops of the Armed Forces of the Russian Federation. Chiefs of the Electronic Warfare Troops of the Russian Armed Forces:

- Major General Ivanov, Oleg Anatolyevich (2008-July 2011);
- Colonel Doskalov, Mikhail Valerievich (2013-2014);
- Lieutenant General Lastochkin, Yuri Illarionovich (2014—present)

== See also ==
- Russian Radio-Technical Troops
