= Przewodów =

- Village
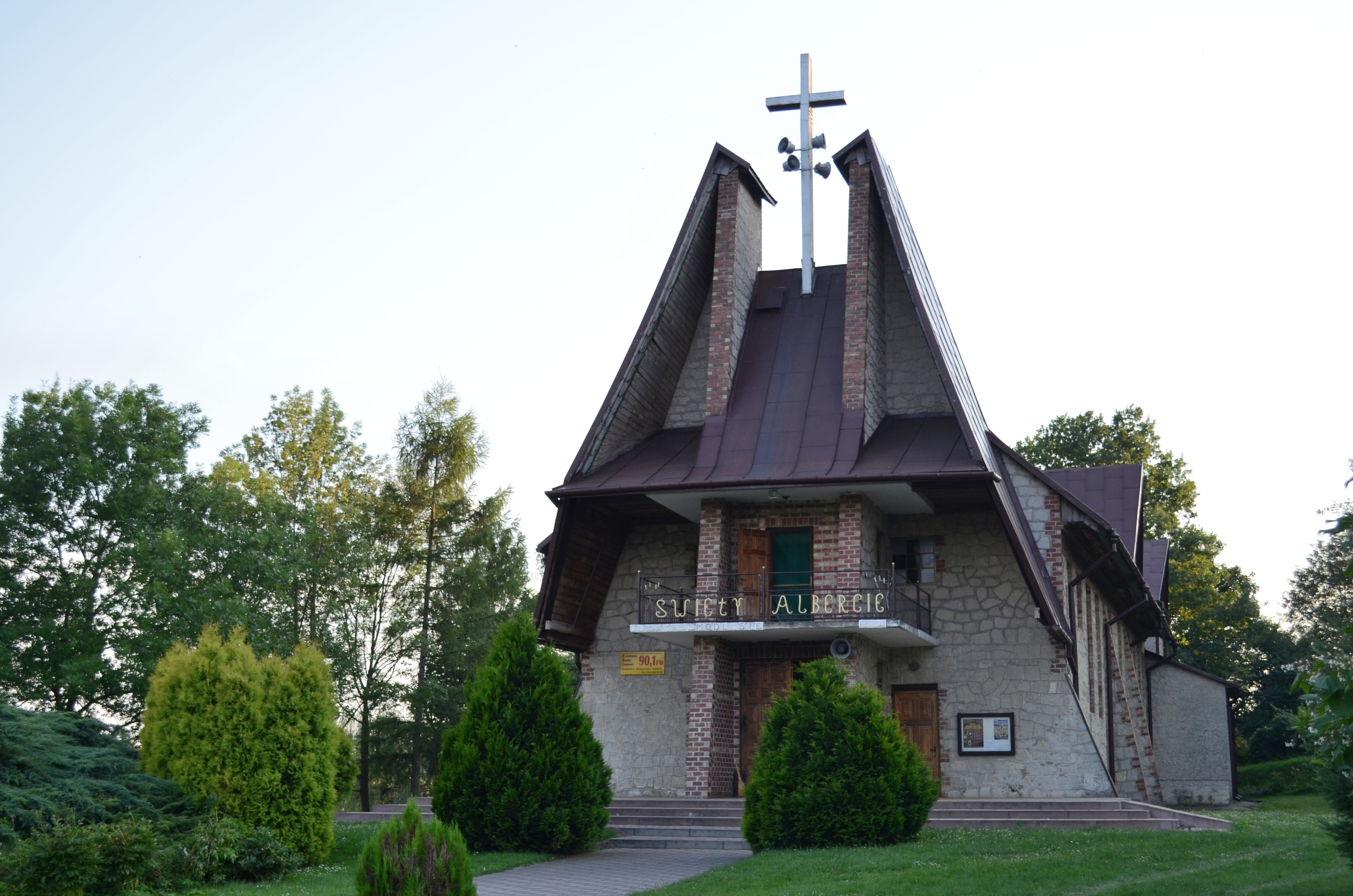
- Saint Albert Chmielowski Church in Przewodów

- Location within Poland
- Coordinates: 50°28′28″N 23°55′39″E
- Country: Poland
- Voivodeship: Lublin
- County: Hrubieszów
- Gmina: Dołhobyczów
- Elevation: 236 m (774 ft)
- Population (2021): 413
- Time zone: UTC+1 (CET)
  - Summer (DST): UTC+2 (CEST)
- Vehicle registration: LHR

Przewodów ([pʂɛˈvɔduf]) is a village in the administrative district of Gmina Dołhobyczów, within Hrubieszów County, Lublin Voivodeship, in southeastern Poland, close to the border with Ukraine. The village is located in the historical region of Galicia.

== History ==
=== Missile strike ===
On the evening of 15 November 2022, the village was hit by a stray missile of Ukrainian origin as a result of the ongoing Russian invasion of Ukraine, killing two people. 24 hours after the hit, access to the settlement was blocked for non-residents and journalists by the Policja.
