= Wyryki (disambiguation) =

Wyryki ([vɨˈrɨki]) may refer to:

- villages in Włodawa County, Lublin Voivodeship, eastern Poland:
  - Wyryki-Kolonia (until December 31, 2019 Wyryki)
  - Wyryki-Adampol
  - Wyryki-Połód
  - Wyryki-Wola
- Gmina Wyryki, rural gmina (administrative district) in Włodawa County, Lublin Voivodeship, eastern Poland

== See also ==
- Wyrzyki (disambiguation)
