= 2025 Russian drone incursion into Poland =

Violation of Polish airspace by drones

- Part of the violations of non-combatant airspace during the Russo-Ukrainian war (2022–present)
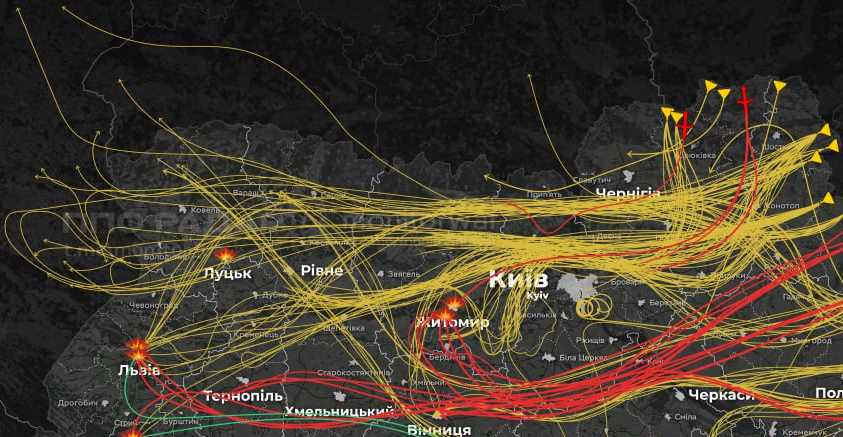
- Visualisation of the drone incursion into Poland (drone flight paths in yellow)

- 2025 Russian drone incursion into Poland (Poland) Locations of drone hits and falls, and associated debris
- Date: 9–10 September 2025
- Time: 23:30–06:45 (CEST)
- Duration: 7 hours 15 minutes
- Location: Eastern, central and northern Poland
- Type: Airspace intrusion by military drones
- Motive: Unknown
- Outcome: Up to 4 of over 30 drones shot down by allied forces.; One house damaged.; Poland invokes Article 4 of the North Atlantic Treaty.; Poland restricts the airspace along its eastern border.; Operation Eastern Sentry begins.
- Countries involved: Poland; Russia; NATO (Note: Poland also is a NATO member.); Italy (Note: Italy provided early warning aircraft.); Germany (Note: Germany utilised Patriot systems.); Netherlands (Note: The Netherlands contributed F-35 fighters, originally stationed in Estonia, and shot down the majority of the drones.); Belgium (Note: Belgium refuelled F-35 aircraft in flight with kerosene.)

On 9 September 2025, at about 11:30 p.m. CEST, over 30 unarmed military drones entered Poland's airspace after allegedly being launched from Russia. The incursion triggered a Quick Reaction Alert; the Polish Air Force and other NATO militaries scrambled aircraft. Up to four drones were confirmed to have been shot down, most by the Dutch Air Force. Poland's prime minister Donald Tusk said that the drones "posed a direct threat". The airspace over Warsaw International Airport, Warsaw Modlin Airport, Rzeszów–Jasionka Airport, and Lublin Airport was closed while the Russian drone fleet was in Polish airspace.

Shortly thereafter, the Polish government invoked Article 4 of the NATO treaty. Polish deputy prime minister Radosław Sikorski said, "We are dealing with an unprecedented case of an attack not only on the territory of Poland but also on the territory of NATO and the EU". After the incident, Russia and Belarus conducted joint military exercises, the largest since the start of the Russian invasion of Ukraine. In response to the drone incursion, NATO launched Operation Eastern Sentry on 12 September.

== Incursion and defence ==
Polish newspaper Rzeczpospolita claimed that the number of Russian drones was around 23; they entered Poland via Belarus. Belarus warned Poland and Lithuania before the incursion that several drones affected by electronic warfare in Ukraine passed through Belarusian territory.

Several NATO countries also took part in the operation to shoot down the drones, aiding the Polish F-16s. The deployment included Dutch F-35 Lightning II, Italian airborne early warning and control aircraft, and a Belgian Airbus A330 MRTT aerial tanker. German MIM-104 Patriot surface-to-air systems in Poland were placed on high alert and tracked the path of the drone wave. Of the drones that were neutralized, most were shot down by Dutch F-35 aircraft. The last interception occurred at 06:45 CEST. Poland's Prime Minister Donald Tusk, among other sources, reported that up to four drones were destroyed by allied forces, and he did not rule out the possibility that more had been brought down. These actions marked the first time Poland, or any NATO country, engaged and downed Russian assets in its airspace since the beginning of Russia's full-scale invasion of Ukraine in 2022.

Locations of drones and debris included several sites near the Polish eastern border (Bychawka Trzecia, Cześniki, Czosnówka, Krzywowierzba-Kolonia, Wielki Łan, Wohyń, Wyhalew, Wyryki-Wola, Zabłocie-Kolonia, and near Rabiany), several in south-eastern Poland (Czyżów, Smyków, Sobótka), as well as a field near Mniszków and the town of Nowe Miasto nad Pilicą in central Poland, and Oleśno in northern Poland. An AIM-120 AMRAAM missile fired at a drone by a Polish F-16 fighter went stray and struck a residential building in Wyryki-Wola, Lublin Voivodeship, destroying the roof of the house, but did not explode. Damage on civilian property was also reported at Czosnówka, while another drone fell on an undisclosed military base.

Debris from an air-to-air missile was found more than a week later in Choiny, some 70 kilometres from the Ukrainian border; almost at the same time that Latvian authorities recovered fragments from a Russian drone on a beach near the western village of Varve, Ventspils district, thought to belong to a drone shot down over Poland. On 20 September a drone made of styrofoam was discovered by a farmer in a marsh at Korsze, Kętrzyn County, Warmian-Masurian Voivodeship, likely the last Russian drone that entered the country during the night of 9–10 September. The type of drone was identical to the one found at Oleśno. A Gerbera drone was found as late as March 12th 2026 in a lignite mine near Galczyce, Greater Poland Voivodeship, some 170 kilometres (110 mi) west of Warsaw.

The next day, a drone and debris from other two drones were recovered from different locations; in Masovian Voivodeship, mushroom collectors came upon fragments of a drone in the village of Wodynie, Siedlce County, while a similar finding of debris was made almost at the same time in a forest near the village of Biała Góra, Białobrzegi County. Another drone appeared in a forest in Sulmice, Zamość County, Lublin Voivodeship. A fragment from a missile used by the NATO fighters to engage the drones was found as late as April 10th 2026 in the village of Jarosławiec, Lublin Voivodeship. By the end of September, an F-35A from the 313th Squadron of the Royal Dutch Air Force received a kill mark for the successful action against the Russian drones in Poland.

=== Related incidents ===
Similar incidents involving drones linked to the Russian invasion of Ukraine continued to occur in neighbouring NATO member states. In May 2026, three Ukrainian drones targeting Russia entered Latvian airspace after reportedly being affected by signal jamming, contributing to a political crisis that led to the resignation of Latvian Prime Minister Evika Siliņa.

== Analysis ==
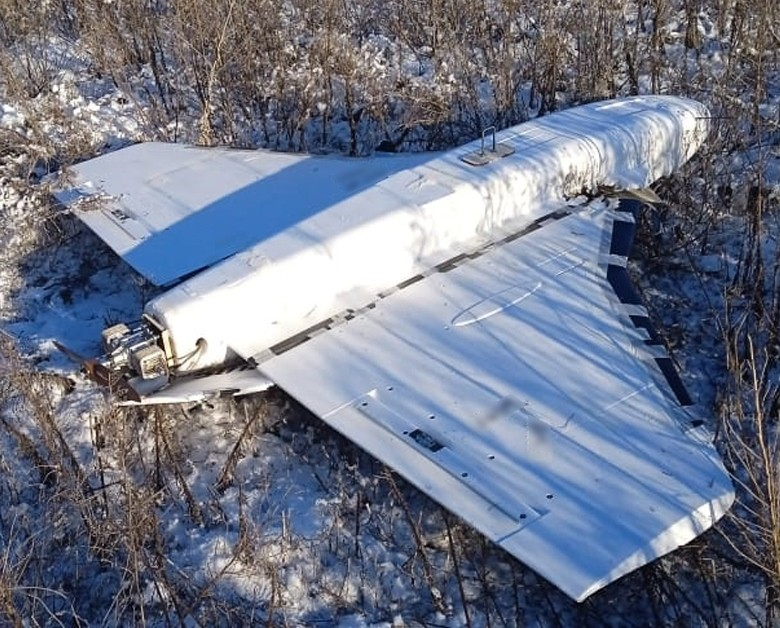
A Gerbera-type drone such as those used in the Russian incursion into Polish air space

At least some of the drones used in the incursion were of the Gerbera type. Others were made of polystyrene rather than plywood. The Regional Prosecutor's Office in Lublin said that the recovered drones were not armed and did not contain explosive materials; it described them as "decoy drones". According to analysts Justin Bronk of RUSI and Justin Crump of the risk and intelligence company Sibylline quoted by BBC Verify, "...the scale of the incursion suggests it was almost certainly a deliberate act on Russia's part." Some of the drones had Polish SIM cards inserted to control them.

Following the 9–10 September incursion, Rzeczpospolita stated that modernisation of the "SkyCTRL" anti-drone system in Poland had been delayed for eighteen months by the Polish Ministry of Defence (MON) due to lack of funds, and that the system was effectively inactive. Rzeczpospolita stated its expectation that MON would find the needed funding, but that several months would be needed for implementation.

As of 12 September 2025, the wrecks of 17 drones have been identified. Marcin Przydacz, the Polish presidential advisor on international affairs, confirmed that 21 drones crossed into Polish airspace during the incursion. According to final findings of the Polish Prosecutor's Office, there were "over 30" drones, which fell in 27 locations, three of which remained undisclosed.

The damaging of the residential building in Wyryki caused a scandal domestically, with Prime Minister Donald Tusk being accused of attempting to cover up that the damage was caused by a Polish missile; furthermore, President Karol Nawrocki and the National Security Bureau had allegedly not been informed of the Polish origin of the missile.

== Polish briefing to United Nations Security Council ==
On 12 September 2025, Poland gave an emergency briefing to the UN Security Council on the incident. The UN Under-Secretary-General for Political and Peacebuilding Affairs Rosemary DiCarlo stated that Poland had reported that during the night of 9 September, 19 Russian drones had entered Polish airspace reportedly causing damage in residential areas of two Polish villages, Wyryki and Czosnówka; no casualties were reported. Belarus had warned Poland as some of the drones approached its airspace. Belarus reported it had intercepted several drones over its territory, stating the drones had been deflected by Ukrainian counter-drone measures causing them to overfly its territory.

A number of representatives to the UN present at the briefing made statements, often on the broader issues of the Russo-Ukrainian War rather than specifically on the drone incursion. No vote took place at this briefing meeting.

The French representative stated that one drone had reached the Gdańsk region, more than 700 km (430 mi) from the Ukrainian border. (Note: However Google Maps shows that the city of Gdańsk is 450 km (280 mi) in a straight line from the closest part of Ukraine's border, and the furthest part of the region only 580 km (360 mi) away from the border.) The Russian Federation representative stated that the Polish authorities had acknowledged that they had not found any explosive warheads on the drones. He stated that the range of drones used in the attack on Ukrainian military targets that night had not exceeded 700 km (430 mi) which made it impossible for them to have reached Polish territory, and Russia was willing to engage in professional discussions with the Polish MOD to understand what had taken place. The Polish representative stated that Polish territorial integrity had been purposely violated by Russian drones on an unprecedented scale, and Poland knew that it was not a mistake.

== Diplomatic reactions ==
- Poland – Prime minister Donald Tusk requested the invocation of Article 4 of the North Atlantic Treaty.
- Russia – Andrey Ordash, Russia's chargé d'affaires in Poland, stated that the accusations of the incursion were groundless.
- Belarus – Intercepted purportedly stray drones. Pavel Muraveiko, the Chief of the General Staff of the Armed Forces of Belarus, said that Belarus had informed Poland and Lithuania ahead of time about drones being out of control due to electronic jamming. He added that "The Republic of Belarus will continue to fulfill its obligations within the framework of the exchange of information on the air situation with the Republic of Poland and the Baltic countries".
- Belgium – Defense minister Theo Francken said "Russian violations of NATO airspace are unacceptable". He also expressed solidarity and support with Poland.
- Bulgaria – President Rumen Radev wrote on X, stating that "Violating the airspace of sovereign Poland leads to a dangerous escalation of tension between Russia and NATO". Prime Minister Rosen Zhelyazkov said "Our position is clear and aligned with that of our allies. We express the Alliance's determination to take all necessary measures foreseen by the treaty".
- European Union – President Ursula von der Leyen stated that the EU stood "in full solidarity with Poland". The High Representative of the Union for Foreign Affairs and Security Policy and Security Policy/Vice-president Kaja Kallas had also released a statement in support of Poland and condemnation of Russia.
- Finland – Prime minister Petteri Orpo condemned Russia's actions and expressed "full support to Poland."
- France – President Emmanuel Macron called the incursion "unacceptable".
- Germany – Defense minister Boris Pistorius said "[t]hese drones were quite obviously deliberately directed on this course—in order to fly into Ukraine". He also expressed support for Poland's requested Article 4 consultations.
- Hungary – Prime minister Viktor Orbán expressed full solidarity with Poland, calling the violation of Poland's territorial integrity "unacceptable".
  - Orbán's statement was rebuffed by Poland's Sikorski, who called Hungary to condemn Russian aggression, approve stronger sanctions against Russia and unblock the disbursement of EU funds for defence and the start of Ukraine's EU accession negotiations. Orbán's message came at a moment of diplomatic crisis between Hungary and Poland, being thus regarded as exceptional by many as Euronews described.
- Italy – Prime minister Giorgia Meloni expressed full solidarity with Poland for the "serious and unacceptable violation" of its airspace.
- Moldova – President Maia Sandu condemned the attack on Ukraine and the violation of Polish airspace, noting that Moldova had suffered similar incidents. She called for greater support for Ukraine and investments in stronger air defense in Europe.
- Norway – Norway's Foreign Minister, Espen Barth Eide, stated his belief that the incident was a Russian attempt to probe NATO during a period of heightened tension.
- Romania – President Nicușor Dan and defense minister Ionuț Moșteanu both declared that Romania stands in full solidarity with Poland. President Dan further added that "Russia must be stopped and pressured to come to the negotiation table". Romania furthermore scrambled fighter jets to monitor a group of Russian drones near its border, though no drones entered Romanian airspace.
- Spain – Prime Minister Pedro Sánchez wrote on X "Russia's violation of European airspace is unacceptable. We express our complete solidarity with Poland, which can always count on Spain in the defense of our common peace and security.". Minister of Foreign Affairs José Manuel Albares said on X "I just spoke with my Polish counterpart. I conveyed Spain's solidarity with him in the face of Russia's flagrant violation of Polish airspace. Europeans and allies are united. We protect the peace and security of Europe and the people of Europe.".
- Ukraine – President Volodymyr Zelenskyy released a statement in which he stated that the incursion could not be called an "accident".
- United Kingdom – Prime Minister Keir Starmer described the drone incursion as "deeply concerning" and as "an extremely reckless move" by Russia. The UK Defence Secretary, John Healey, described it as "a new level of hostility against Europe." He also stated that he had asked the UK armed forces to "look at options to bolster NATO's air defence over Poland," adding, "We see what Putin is doing. Yet again he is testing us. Yet again we will stand firm."
- United States – Ambassador to NATO Matthew Whitaker said "We stand by our [NATO] Allies in the face of these airspace violations and will defend every inch of NATO territory." President Donald Trump posted on Truth Social, "What's with Russia violating Poland's airspace with drones? Here we go!".

== Aftermath ==
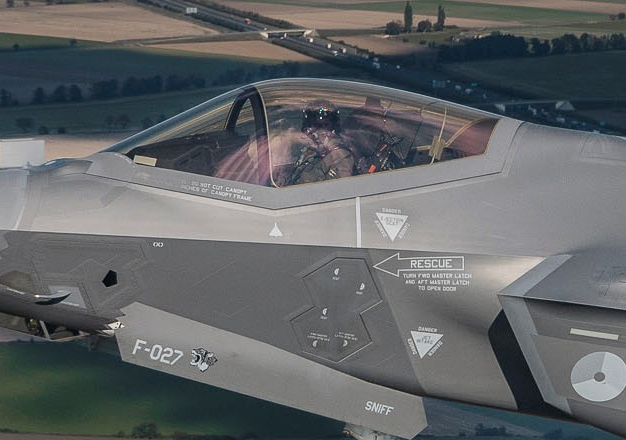
A Dutch F-35 sporting a drone victory marking

=== Military support for Poland ===
A number of countries have pledged military support for Poland following the drone incursion:

- Czech Republic has sent a special operations team consisting of three Mi-171Sh helicopters and around 100 soldiers.
- France has deployed three Dassault Rafale fighters to Poland to assist in defending their airspace.
- Netherlands supplied Patriot, NASAMS systems, and counter-drone equipment, as well as 300 soldiers.
- Norway is planning to send F-35 fighters to Poland as part of Operation Eastern Sentry.
- Sweden urgently sent more Gripen fighters and air defense systems to Poland.
- Ukraine will provide Poland with anti-drone training.
- United Kingdom is considering re-deploying up to six Eurofighter Typhoon fighters to Poland.

=== Polish-Belarusian border closure during Zapad 2025 exercise ===
On 9 September 2025, Polish Prime Minister Donald Tusk announced that Poland would close its border with Belarus at midnight on 11 September, citing national security concerns over aggressive military tactics that were to take place near the Polish border during the Zapad 2025 exercises. Polish Interior Minister Marcin Kierwiński said the border would only be reopened when the government was certain that there was no longer a threat to Polish citizens. NATO and neighbouring countries like Lithuania have also strengthened their border security in response to the exercises. Relations between Poland and Belarus have been increasingly strained since the Russian invasion of Ukraine in 2022, with both countries recently arresting each other's nationals on espionage charges, further escalating tensions. Belarus condemned the closure, describing it as an "abuse" of Poland's geographic position. The border was closed on 12 September and reopened on 25 September.

The border closure blocked the China-Europe Railway Express freight route (also known as New Eurasian Land Bridge) which uses the now-closed Małaszewicze border crossing. The route carries about 3.7% of EU-China trade, which will have to switch to slower routes or air freight. China's Foreign Ministry spokesperson said "We hope Poland will take effective measures to ensure the safe and smooth operation of the Express and the stability of international industrial and supply chains."

Until December 9th, Poland also banned drones and restricted small and recreational aircraft near its eastern borders with Belarus and Ukraine, from about 26 to 46 km (16 to 29 mi) inland, and up to flight level FL095 (9,500 feet (2.9 km)) so it would not generally affect commercial air flights. Crewed aircraft with a flight plan, transponders and two-way communications would be permitted in daylight hours.

=== Operation Eastern Sentry ===
On 12 September 2025, NATO Secretary General Mark Rutte announced that action to protect the alliance's eastern borders would begin in the following days, involving military forces from Denmark, France, the United Kingdom, Germany, and others under the name of Eastern Sentry. Rutte said that "Russia's recklessness in the air, along our eastern flank, is increasing in frequency" and that the mission would be "flexible and agile". The operation's assets will include two F-16s and a Danish anti-air frigate, along with three Rafale jets from France and four Eurofighters from Germany. Rutte added that "Although the immediacy of our focus is on Poland, this situation transcends the border of one nation. What affects one ally affects us all." Eastern Sentry is based upon the already ongoing Baltic Sentry, an initiative launched in response to the sabotage of cables in the Baltic Sea.

=== "Drone Wall" ===
At a European meeting in Brussels on 15 October, Sikorski said that all Putin had done was to consolidate Western opinion against him, and that the incursion was "tactically stupid and unproductive". He also pointedly remarked that "He's [Putin's] been at war with us, but we didn't acknowledge it because it seemed too preposterous and too strange". On 23 October EU leaders were expected to endorse a strategy to protect Europe from a foreign invasion by 2030, the drone defence elements of which were expected to be rebranded given the initial simplistic nomenclature.

== See also ==
- Violations of non-combatant airspaces during the Russian invasion of Ukraine
- 2022 missile explosion in Poland – 2022 explosions in Poland
- 2024 drone sightings
- 2025 Russian railway sabotage in Poland
