= History of archaeological research in Poland =

The history of archaeological research in Poland encompasses the development of antiquarian studies, prehistoric investigations, archaeological excavations, and academic archaeology in the territory of present-day Poland. Interest in the material remains of the past developed before archaeology became an established academic discipline. The establishment of universities and research institutions, the development of prehistoric chronology, and the growth of field archaeology contributed to the formation of archaeology as a distinct discipline.

== Early Antiquarian Interest ==
Interest in the material remains of earlier periods in Polish lands preceded the establishment of archaeology as a scientific discipline. Coins, ancient artefacts, burial places, and architectural remains were collected and described in antiquarian and historical contexts. Over time, the investigation of such objects increasingly involved questions of chronology, cultural change, and the reconstruction of past societies from material evidence. Medieval chroniclers such as Wincenty Kadłubek, Dzierzwa, and Jan Długosz constructed origin narratives that connected the Poles with biblical and classical antiquity.

During the Renaissance, the Sarmatian-origin theory became a core element of Polish-Lithuanian political ideology. It presented the nobility as descendants of the ancient Sarmatians and encouraged interest in antiquities, genealogy, and the remote past. Archaeological excavations resembling modern archaeological investigations are documented by the late 14th and early 15th centuries, including digs commissioned by Louis I of Brzeg in 1390 and Władysław Jagiełło in 1416.

== 19th century ==
Following the Partitions of Poland (1772–1795) by the Russian, Prussian, and Austrian Empires, archaeological activity became linked with the search for national identity and Slavic origins. Polish scholars established scientific societies to document material heritage across divided territories.

=== 1816 – Royal University of Warsaw ===
The foundation of the Royal University of Warsaw in 1816 provided an early institutional setting for the study and collection of antiquities. A Numismatic Cabinet was established in the same year, followed by a Cabinet of Ancient Curiosities in 1826.

The university was closed by the Russian authorities in 1831 following the November Uprising. This interruption affected the development of its scholarly institutions. Antiquarian and numismatic activities subsequently resumed within the educational institutions established in Warsaw, including the Main School of Warsaw, founded in 1862. The Main School was closed in 1869 and replaced by the Imperial University of Warsaw.

=== Mid-19th century – Archaeology and university teaching in Kraków ===
The development of university archaeology in Kraków was associated with the Jagiellonian University and the work of Józef Łepkowski (1826–1894). Łepkowski contributed to the institutional recognition of archaeology as a university discipline and helped establish archaeological collections at the university. His teaching and scholarly activities encompassed prehistory, art history, the conservation of monuments, and auxiliary historical sciences.

=== Late 19th century – Development of prehistoric chronology ===
During the second half of the nineteenth century, research mainly focused on establishing the chronology of prehistoric settlements, burials, and artefacts. Archaeologists compared pottery, metal objects, burial customs, and other material evidence to distinguish archaeological periods and cultural groups.

== 20th century ==
=== 1918–1939 – Institutional development ===
Following the restoration of Polish independence in 1918, universities and museums became educational centres for archaeological teaching, fieldwork, and the study of prehistoric material. Archaeologists developed research programmes on prehistoric settlement, burial practices, and the cultural chronology of the region. Leading figures included Erazm Majewski, Włodzimierz Antoniewicz, Włodzimierz Demetrykiewicz, Piotr Bieńkowski, and Józef Kostrzewski.

The University of Poznań became a centre for prehistoric archaeology. Józef Kostrzewski (1885–1969), appointed professor of prehistory at the university in 1919, became associated with research into the prehistory of Polish lands and the excavations at Biskupin. His work contributed to the development of prehistoric archaeology as an institutionalised academic discipline in interwar Poland.

=== 1933–1939 – Excavations at Biskupin ===
In 1933, local teacher Walenty Szwajcer informed Józef Kostrzewski about archaeological remains exposed near Biskupin in the Greater Poland region. Systematic excavations began in 1934 under Kostrzewski and his colleagues, including Zdzisław Rajewski. The investigations uncovered a fortified settlement with substantial timber structures preserved in waterlogged deposits.

The settlement was associated with the Lusatian culture. Dendrochronological research subsequently established that much of the timber used in its construction came from trees felled during the winter of 738/737 BC. The preservation of wooden structures and the scale of the excavations made Biskupin an important site for the study of settlement organisation and construction during the Late Bronze Age and Early Iron Age.

=== 1939–1945 – Archaeology during the Second World War ===
The Second World War disrupted archaeological fieldwork, academic teaching, and the operation of research institutions in Poland. Archaeologists faced persecution, the destruction or displacement of collections, and the interruption of scholarly activities.

Archaeological work at Biskupin was interrupted by the war, and investigations resumed after 1945. The experience of occupation and the destruction caused by the war shaped the subsequent reconstruction of Polish archaeological institutions and the priorities of post-war research.

=== 1948–1970 – The Millennium research programme ===
After the war, Polish archaeologists undertook extensive research into the beginnings and development of the early Polish state. The programme commonly known as the Millennium research programme began in 1948–1949 and continued into 1970. It was connected with preparations for the commemorations of the millennium of the Polish state and the baptism of Mieszko I, celebrated in 1965–1966.

The programme involved archaeological investigations of early medieval settlements, strongholds, and other sites associated with the Piast dynasty. Research was conducted at multiple centres, including Poznań, and received state financial and organisational support. Its priorities were influenced by contemporary historiography and the political context of post-war Poland.

In 1959, Michałowski established the Polish Centre of Mediterranean Archaeology (PCMA) at the University of Warsaw, accompanied by its permanent station, the Research Centre in Cairo. PCMA became the institutional framework enabling generations of Polish teams to conduct excavations across North Africa, the Levant, Cyprus, and the Persian Gulf.

== Major International Projects and Discoveries ==
- Edfu (Egypt, 1937–1939): Early joint Franco-Polish excavations at Tell Edfu laid the operational foundations for Polish field methods in the Near East.
- Faras Cathedral (Sudan, 1961–1964): As part of the international UNESCO Campaign to Save the Monuments of Nubia before the flooding of Lake Nasser, Michałowski's team discovered the submerged 8th–12th century Cathedral of Faras. Archaeologists salvaged over 100 early medieval Christian Nubian wall paintings (now housed in the National Museum in Warsaw and the National Museum of Sudan in Khartoum).
- Deir el-Bahari (Egypt, 1961–Present): Long-term architectural conservation and epigraphic recording at the Temple of Hatshepsut. Polish conservators rebuilt the temple's upper terrace, Third Portico, and Sanctuary of Amun.
- Alexandria / Kom el-Deka (Egypt, 1960–Present): Long-running excavations uncovered Egypt's only Roman-era theater, a complex of 22 late-antique lecture halls (an early academic campus), and extensive imperial baths.
- Palmyra (Syria, 1959–2011): Excavations at the Sanctuary of Baalshamin, the Camp of Diocletian, and the recovery of the famous Lion of Al-lāt statue.
- Paphos (Cyprus, 1965–Present): Excavation of the House of Aion and Villa of Theseus, revealing Roman floor mosaics dating to the 4th-century AD.
- Tell el-Farkha (Nile Delta, Egypt, 1998–Present): Discoveries of Predynastic administrative complexes, early golden statues of regional rulers, and trade outposts predating the unification of Ancient Egypt.

== Twenty-first Century ==
Polish archaeology has become increasingly interdisciplinary, with collaboration between archaeologists, physical anthropologists, historians, geologists, palaeoenvironmental specialists, and other researchers in the 21st century. Scientific analyses of human skeletal remains, animal bones, botanical material, and ancient construction techniques have broadened the scope of archaeological investigations. Digital documentation and non-invasive survey methods have also contributed to the identification, recording, and preservation of archaeological sites.

In January 2026, an authorised metal detectorist discovered a well-preserved Cross of Military Merit of the Order of St. George in the Chełm State Forests, eastern Poland. The artefact is a 4th Class silver cross, bearing the serial number 195685, and was originally awarded to Nikolai Nesterovich Mikheev, a rifleman serving in the 3rd Life Guards Rifle Regiment of the Imperial Russian Army under Nicholas II.

In February 2026, researchers from the Historical and Archaeological Museum in Ostrowiec Świętokrzyski, in collaboration with the Relicta Foundation, reported the results of archaeological surveys at Gawroniec Hill, near Ćmielów in the Świętokrzyskie Voivodeship, southern Poland. The investigation covered approximately 7.5 hectares and combined airborne laser scanning (LiDAR) with magnetic surveys. Researchers identified several thousand archaeological features, including settlement pits and industrial structures, with concentrations reaching approximately 100 features per hectare.

In February 2026, researchers from Poland's Relicta Foundation confirmed the location of the medieval town of Stolzenberg, concealed beneath woodland near the settlement of Zagrody, close to Sławoborze in West Pomerania. The town was probably established during the late 13th or early 14th century and functioned as an urban settlement for a relatively short period before being abandoned. Although its existence had been mentioned in historical documents and 19th-century German publications, its precise location had remained uncertain.

In February 2026, archaeologists reported the results of investigations at a previously undocumented early medieval stronghold concealed within the marshland and woodland of the Włodawa Forests, near Kaplonosy Kolonia in Wyryki Commune, eastern Poland. The site was initially identified in 2016 through aerial photography and LiDAR analysis conducted by G. Mączka of the Lublin Voivodeship Office for the Protection of Monuments. Subsequent field surveys in 2024 and 2025 confirmed that the site was a fortified settlement dating from the 10th to 13th centuries CE.

In March 2026, archaeologists from the University of Warsaw presented new findings concerning the origins and development of the Mazovian Centre of Metallurgy, one of the largest ancient iron-production regions in Central Europe. Research conducted as part of the multidisciplinary Terra Ferrifera project focused particularly on the archaeological landscape around Zaborów, west of Warsaw, near Kampinos National Park. Radiocarbon dating of botanical remains recovered from iron-smelting furnaces indicates that organised iron production in the region began during the late 4th or 3rd century BCE, approximately a century earlier than previously assumed.

In April 2026, archaeologists in north-western Poland investigated a forest near Zdanów, historically known as Zankhof, in West Pomerania, uncovering the remains of a German soldier from the Second World War. The investigation was prompted by a local legend claiming that a German officer had been buried in the forest, possibly with personal valuables. Archaeological fieldwork and examination of the recovered remains instead established that the individual was a German serviceman, challenging the longstanding account.

In April 2026, members of the Pilica Line Fortification Society uncovered a previously unknown metal hoard in woodland near Spała, within the administrative district of Gmina Inowłódz, Łódź Voivodeship, central Poland. The discovery was made by a metal-detecting group led by Bartosz Koperkiewicz. After identifying the objects, the team reported the find to the relevant authorities in Łódź and obtained official permission before conducting a controlled excavation. The assemblage contained several spiral-shaped armlets, fragments of greaves made from bronze and iron, a knife and a bracelet. Researchers also identified smaller objects that may contain gold, although their composition has not yet been confirmed. The spiral ornaments are difficult to date based on their form alone, as similar designs occur across different archaeological periods and geographical regions.

In November 2026, archaeologists and members of the DRACO Żmigród Association of History Explorers reported the recovery of two elaborately decorated metal fittings from the moat surrounding the historic palace at Pielaszkowice, in Lower Silesia. The investigation forms part of an ongoing project examining archaeological material associated with the palace and its history, particularly objects believed to have been discarded during the final stages and immediate aftermath of the Second World War. The investigation also recovered numerous additional fragments and objects, although their full identification has not yet been published.

== See also ==
History of Poland
