= Operation Eastern Sentry =

NATO operation in Central and Eastern Europe since 2025

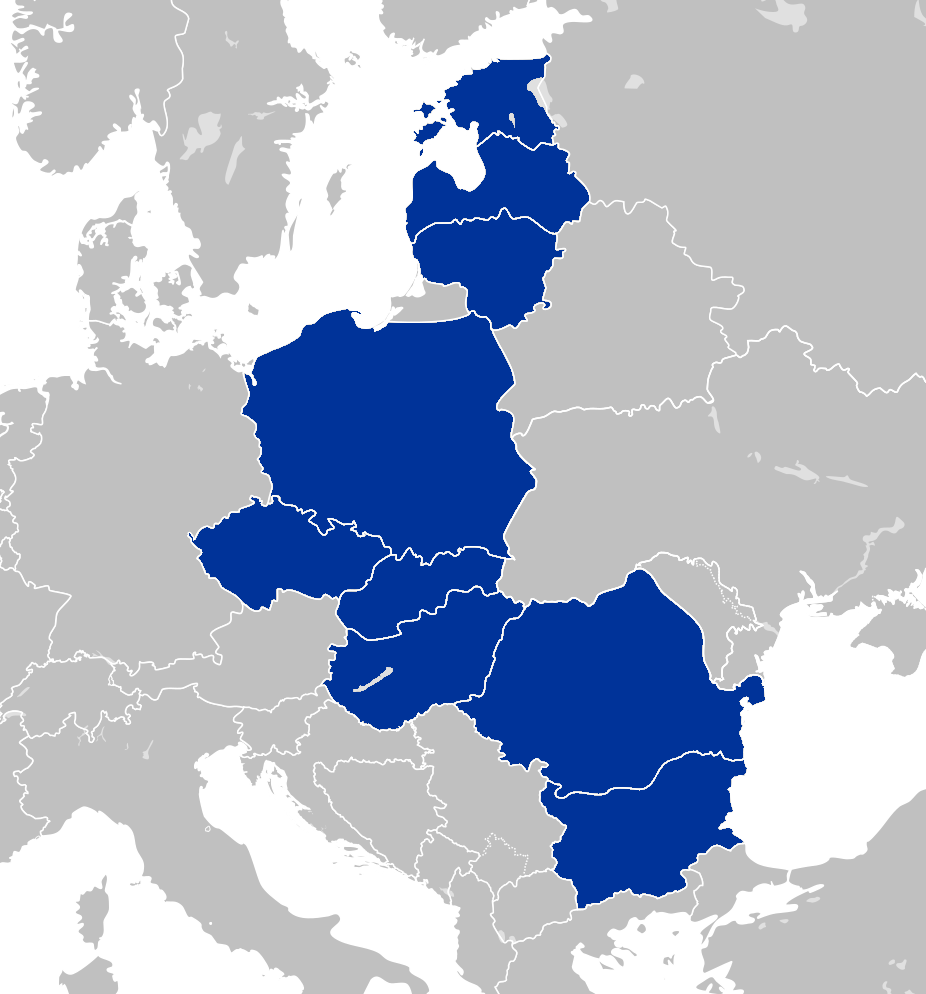
- Operational scope: NATO's deterrent and defence operation to protect Europe's eastern flank.
- Location: Central and Eastern Europe
- Planned by: NATO
- Date: 12 September 2025 – present

Operation Eastern Sentry (or Eastern Sentinel) is a NATO operation to protect territory along NATO's eastern flank, made in response to an Article 4 declaration by the Polish government in response to a Russian drone incursion into Poland on 9–10 September 2025. Operation Eastern Sentry was launched two days later on 12 September 2025, without a stated end date. The primary purpose of the operation is to increase NATO's capacity—in the air, at sea, and on the ground—to counter military threats posed by Russia, in particular to intercept Russian drones violating the airspace of NATO member states. Whereas this responsibility was previously carried out by the individual member states, Eastern Sentry established a collective policy and conduct for aerial defence on NATO's eastern flank.

== Background ==
On 14 January 2025, NATO had already launched Baltic Sentry in order "to enhance NATO's military presence in the Baltic Sea and improve Allies' ability to respond to destabilizing acts."

Prime Minister Donald Tusk of Poland stated that the Russian drone incursion of Polish airspace had brought Poland "the closest to an armed conflict since the Second World War." Stating that the Russian drone incursion was still being investigated, NATO Secretary General Mark Rutte said:

Whilst this was the largest concentration of violations of NATO airspace that we have seen, what happened on Wednesday was not an isolated incident. Russia's recklessness in the air along our eastern flank is increasing in frequency. We have seen drones violate our airspace in Romania, Estonia, Latvia, and Lithuania. Whether intentional or not, it is dangerous and unacceptable. (...) Allies expressed full solidarity with Poland, and denounced Russia's reckless behaviour. (...) [W]e are prepared and ready to defend every inch of Allied territory. We stood up Baltic Sentry at the beginning of this year, to help safeguard critical infrastructure from reckless behaviour in the Baltic Sea. And today, General Grynkewich and I are here to announce that NATO is launching Eastern Sentry, to bolster our posture even further along our eastern flank."

— Mark Rutte, Secretary General of NATO, Press Conference, 12 September 2025

== Support ==
=== Support by Country ===
Czechia
Czechia immediately deployed three modernized Mi-171Sh helicopters to Poland on 14 September 2025, only a few days after the drone incursion. These were swapped out by four UH-1Y Venom helicopters in March 2026. Then again in June 2026, the UH-1Ys were replaced by two AH-1Z Viper attack helicopters. Following the crash of a Czech UH-1Y Venom on 23 July 2026, all H-1 helicopters (UH-1Y and AH-1Z) were grounded immediately, including those deployed in Poland at the time. The AH-1Zs resumed operations in August after the H-1 family was cleared.
Denmark
Two F-16s, one Iver Huitfeldt class frigate
France
Three Dassault Rafales
Germany
Four Eurofighters
Italy
Two F-35As, one SAMP/T in Estonia
Spain
One Eurofighter
Slovakia
Slovakia approved a decision to send 101 soldiers with new ELM 2084 M-MMR radars to Poland and Romania to protect their airspace and to familiarize themselves with the new radars as they enter service.
United Kingdom
Two Eurofighters were deployed to Poland.

== See also ==
- 2022 missile explosion in Poland
- Bucharest Nine, an organization consisting of nine post-Soviet NATO members created to counter Russian aggression
- Øresund drone incident
- Violations of non-combatant airspaces during the Russian invasion of Ukraine
- Zapad 2025, Russian-Belarusian joint strategic military exercise, conducted in Belarus on 12–16 September 2025
- List of NATO operations
