= Siedliska, Włodawa County =

Siedliska
- Village
- Location within Poland
- Coordinates: 51°38′35″N 23°21′20″E
- Country: Poland
- Voivodeship: Lublin
- County: Włodawa
- Gmina: Wyryki
- Time zone: UTC+1 (CET)
  - Summer (DST): UTC+2 (CEST)
- Vehicle registration: LWL

Siedliska [ɕɛdˈlʲiska] is a village in the administrative district of Gmina Wyryki, within Włodawa County, Lublin Voivodeship, in eastern Poland.
