= Suchawa, Lublin Voivodeship =

Suchawa
- Village
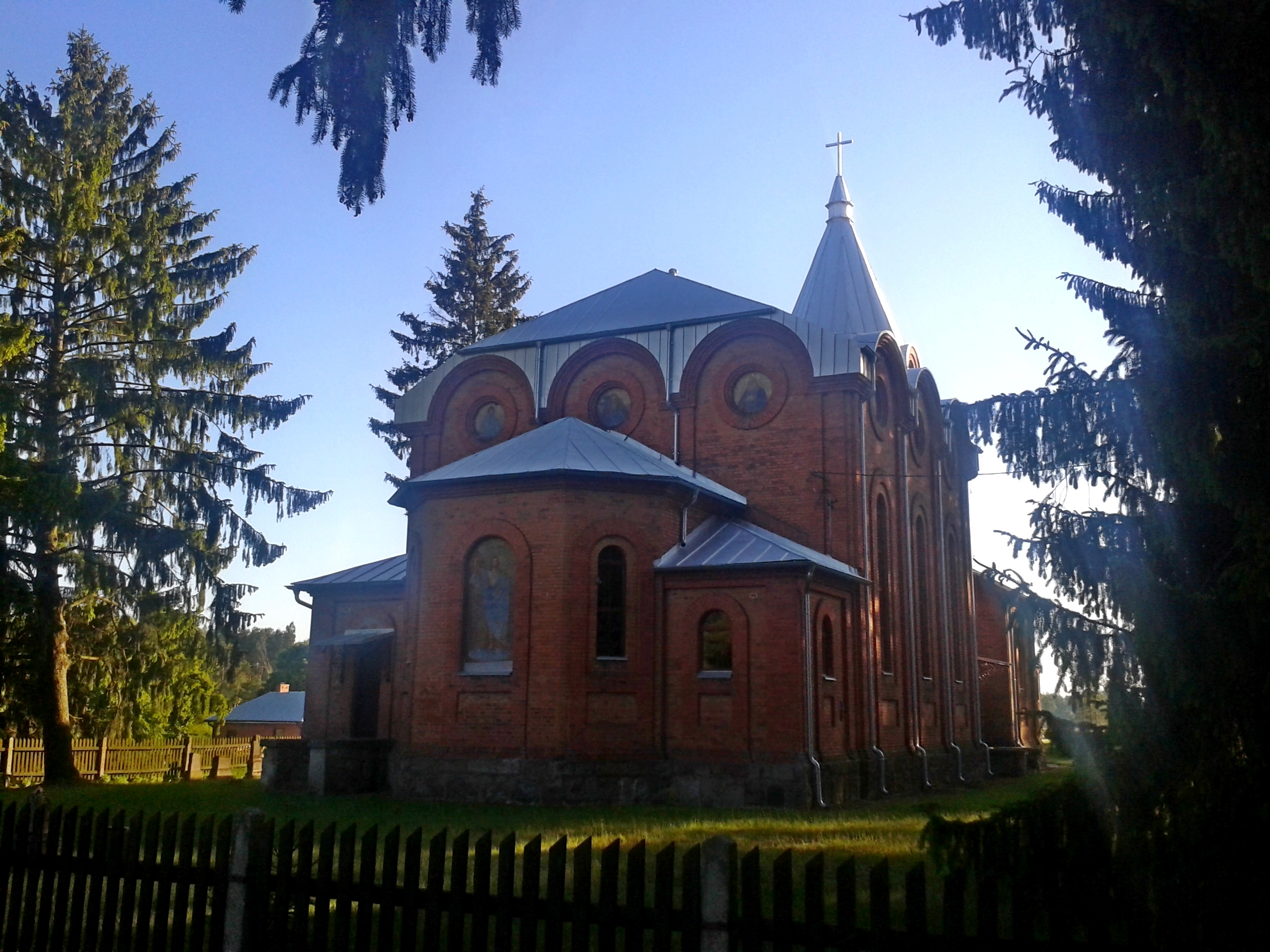
- Church in Suchawa

- Location within Poland
- Coordinates: 51°30′N 23°25′E
- Country: Poland
- Voivodeship: Lublin
- County: Włodawa
- Gmina: Wyryki
- Time zone: UTC+1 (CET)
  - Summer (DST): UTC+2 (CEST)
- Vehicle registration: LWL

Suchawa [suˈxava] is a village in the administrative district of Gmina Wyryki, within Włodawa County, Lublin Voivodeship, in eastern Poland.
