= Zahajki, Włodawa County =

Zahajki
- Village
- Location within Poland
- Coordinates: 51°36′N 23°17′E
- Country: Poland
- Voivodeship: Lublin
- County: Włodawa
- Gmina: Wyryki

Zahajki [zaˈxai̯ki] is a village in the administrative district of Gmina Wyryki, within Włodawa County, Lublin Voivodeship, in eastern Poland.
