= Wyrzyki =

Wyrzyki may refer to:

- Wyrzyki, Łosice County in Masovian Voivodeship (east-central Poland)
- Wyrzyki, Pułtusk County in Masovian Voivodeship (east-central Poland)
- Wyrzyki, Podlaskie Voivodeship (north-east Poland)

== See also ==
- Wyryki (disambiguation)
