= Adampol, Lublin Voivodeship =

Adampol
- Village
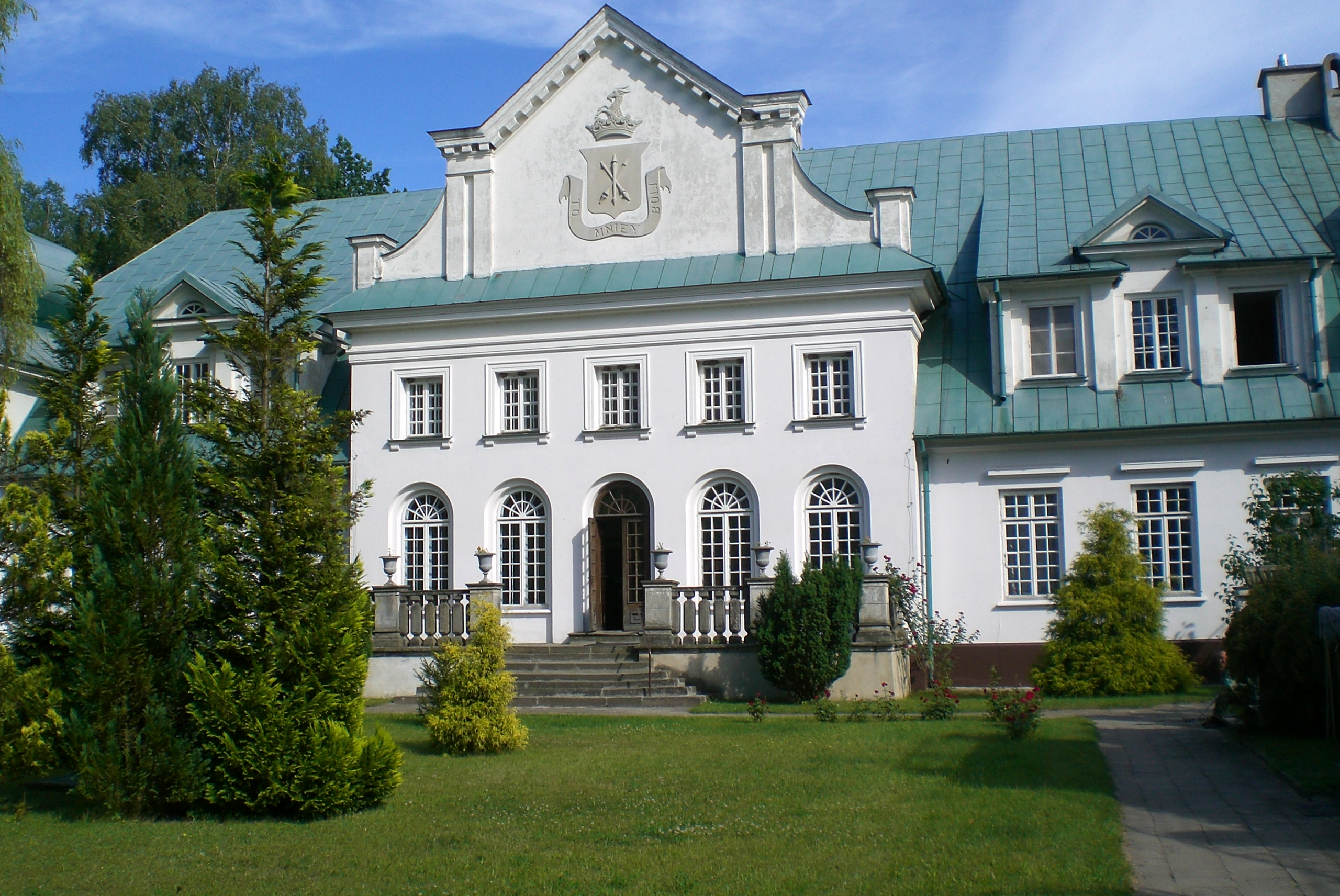
- Zamoyski Palace in Adampol

- Location within Poland
- Coordinates: 51°32′57″N 23°27′53″E
- Country: Poland
- Voivodeship: Lublin
- County: Włodawa
- Gmina: Wyryki
- Time zone: UTC+1 (CET)
  - Summer (DST): UTC+2 (CEST)
- Vehicle registration: LWL

Adampol [aˈdampɔl] is a village in the administrative district of Gmina Wyryki, within Włodawa County, Lublin Voivodeship, in eastern Poland.

== History ==
During World War II Adampol was occupied by Germany from 1939 to 1944. It was the site of an Arbeitslager, a slave-labor subcamp of the Sobibor extermination camp nearby. Jewish partisans rescued several Jewish girls from a farm at Adampol, where they were being kept hostage 'for the pleasure of German officers'. Adamow Labor Camp was liquidated on 13 August 1943.

There is a memorial to the Jews who were murdered in Adampol at the entrance to the estate where the Nazis were headquartered, paid for by the Pomeranc and Blaichman families. In 2016, Dr. Caroline Sturdy Colls uncovered evidence of mass graves in Adampol.
