= Victory marking =

Decoration applied to military aircraft and vehicles

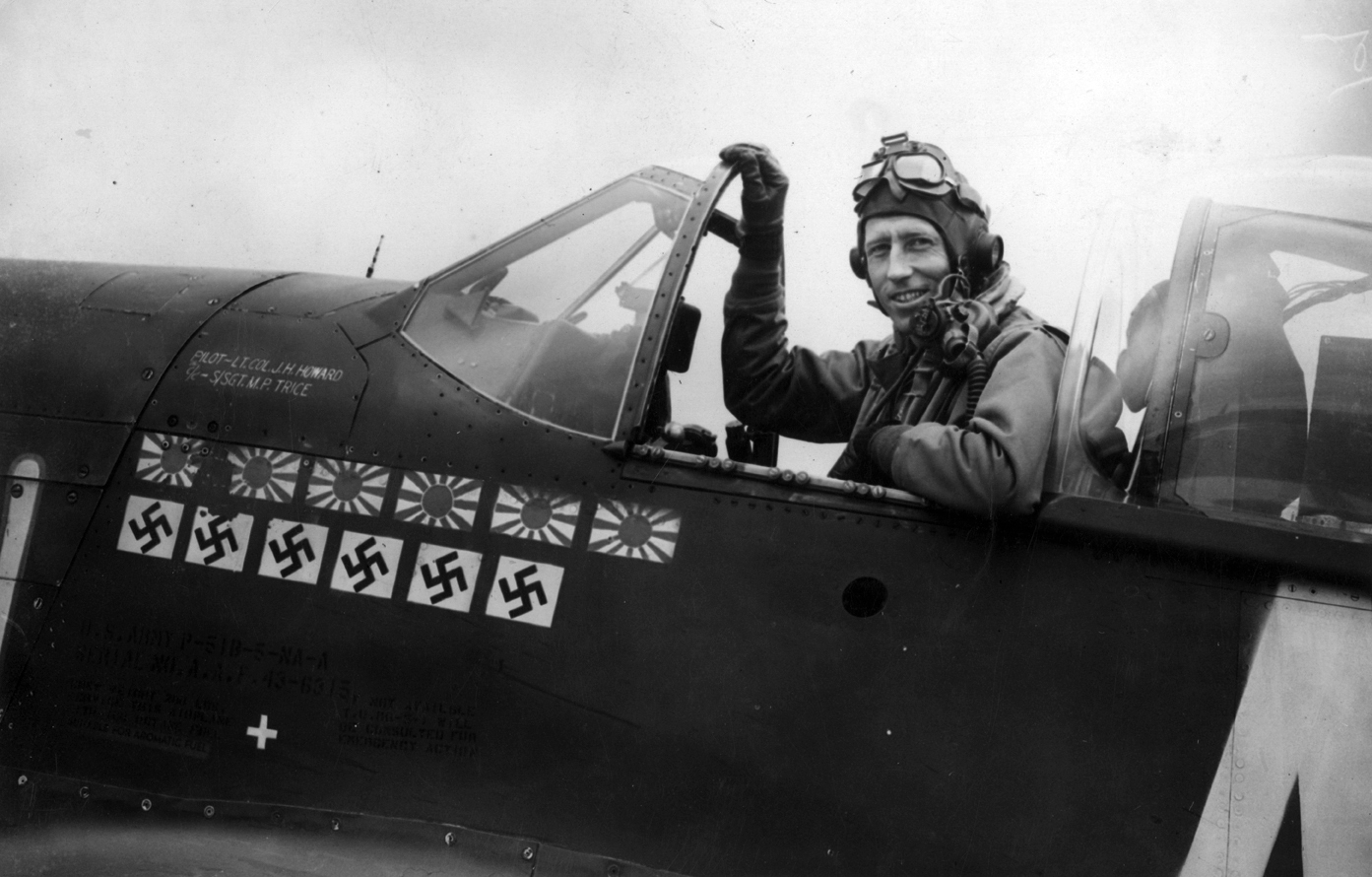
Lt Col James H. Howard's P-51 Mustang with 12 kill marks for aerial victories over German and Japanese pilots

A victory marking (also called a victory mark, kill marking, or kill mark, or mission symbol) is a symbol applied in stencil or decal to the side of a military aircraft, ship or ground vehicle to denote a victory achieved by the pilot or crew against an aerial target. The use of victory markings originated during World War I, burgeoned during World War II and frequently took the form of the roundel or national flag of the nationality of the military target defeated. Sometimes damaged targets also included, but the mark will be slightly different to distinguish them from those targets that are destroyed. These enemy targets can be planes, trains, ships and sea mines in World War II, which later also include helicopters, cruise missiles and drones in subsequent conflicts. The manner of destruction that qualify for a victory mark also varies, from bombs and cannons by planes, deck guns by ships to torpedoes by submarines.

In 2012, a German Eurofighter was spotted with a kill mark denoting a simulated victory over a U.S. Air Force F-22 Raptor, achieved in a dogfight during a training exercise.

In the United States Air Force, as of 2010, victory markings are applied in the form of six-inch (150 mm) green stars set within a black border with the type of aircraft defeated stencilled inside the star in white lettering.

In the Russo-Ukrainian War, Ukrainian anti-air defenses such as Flakpanzer Gepards and Patriot Missile systems are decorated with victory markings for successfully shooting down Russian aerial targets, missiles and Iranian Shahed drones.

== Mission symbol ==
Victory marks have been applied to aircraft for reasons other than aerial victories. During the period of its use for astronaut recovery, the U.S. Navy's Helicopter 66 bore victory marks showing a space capsule silhouette, with one mark added for each recovery in which it participated.

== Gallery ==
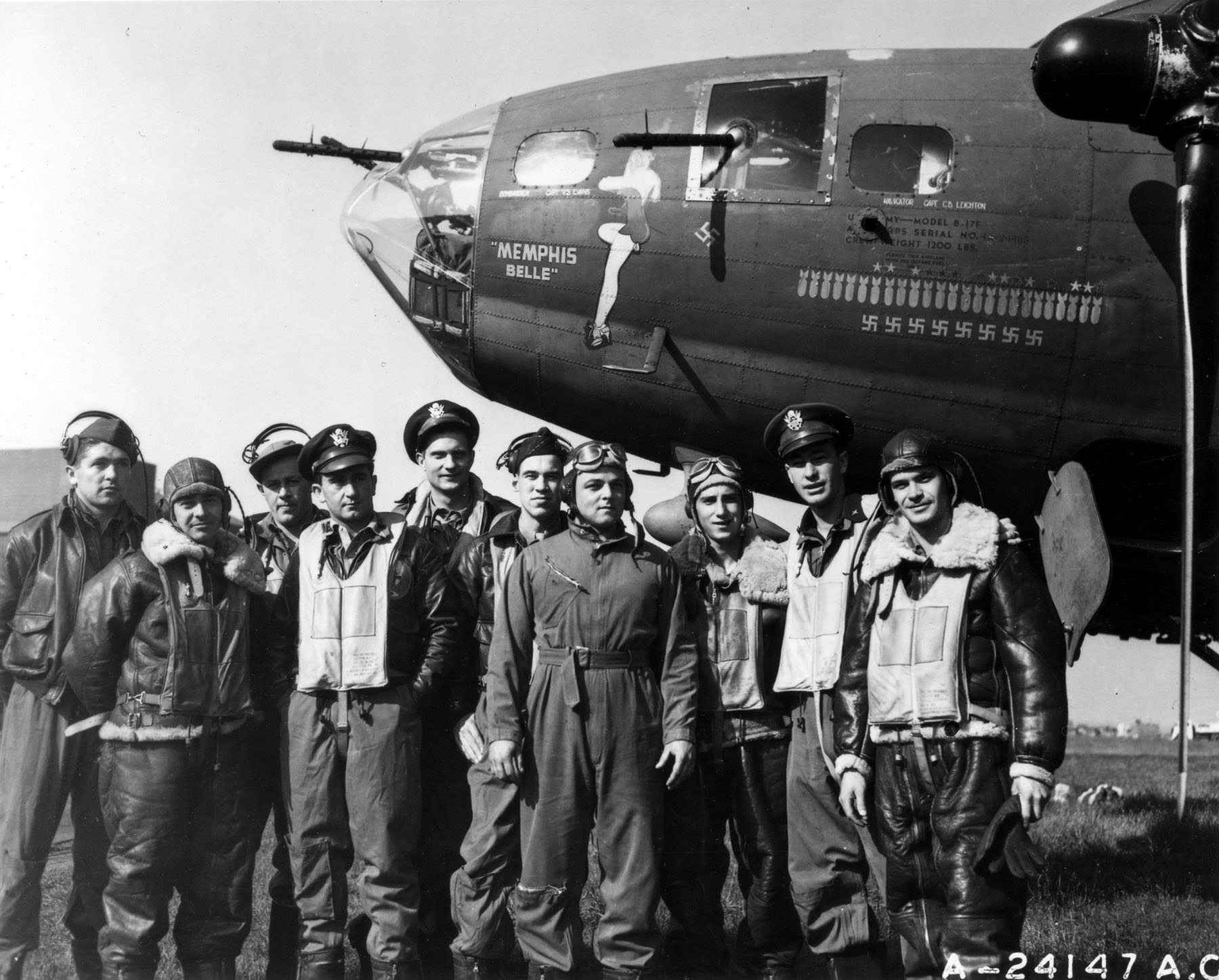
Boeing B-17 Flying Fortress Memphis Belle with victory markings signifying 25 bombing missions and 8 fighter kills.

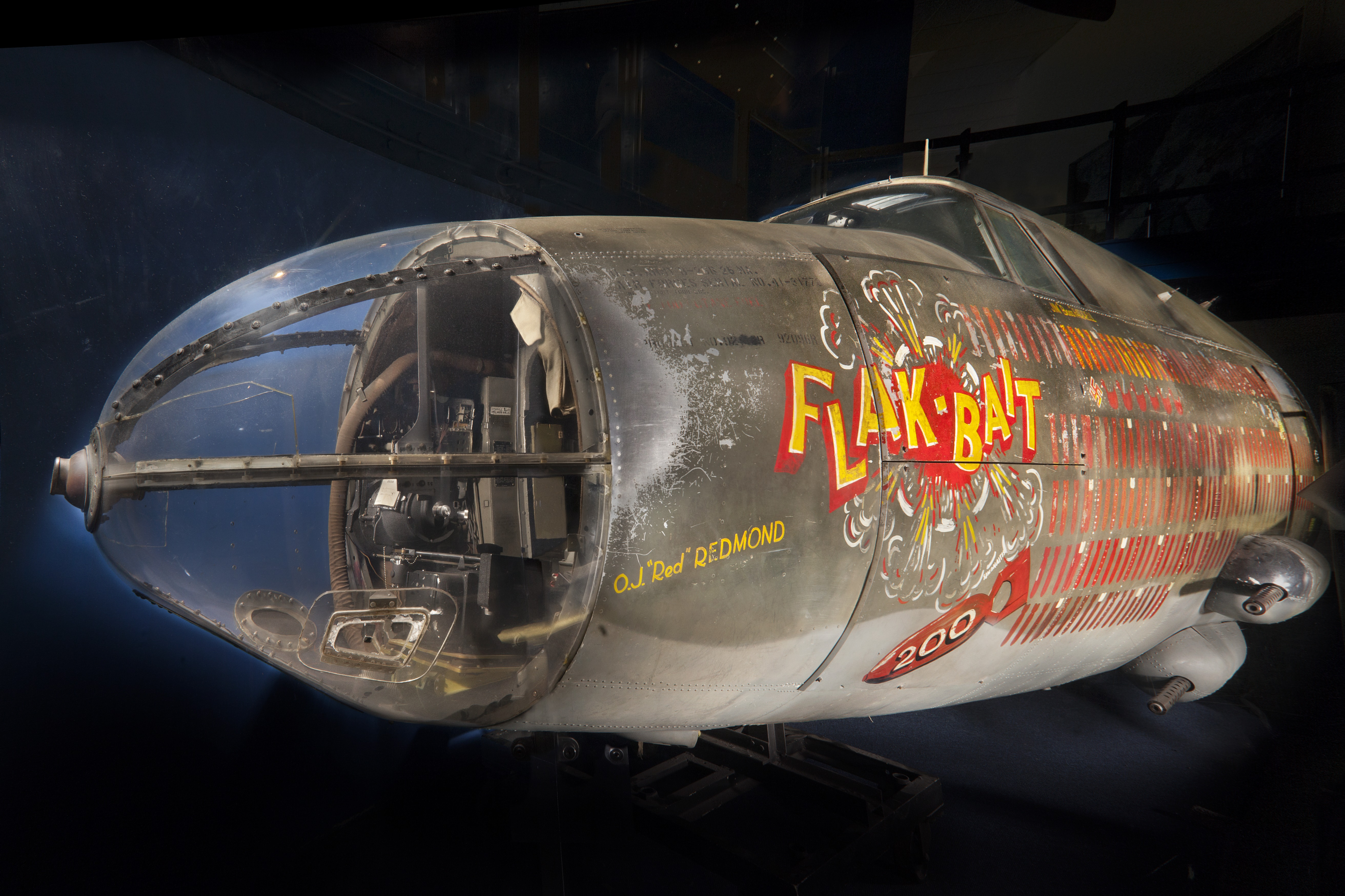
Nose section of Martin B-26 Marauder Flak-Bait (serial no. 41-31773), showing the large number of victory marks from its 207 missions over Europe during World War II.

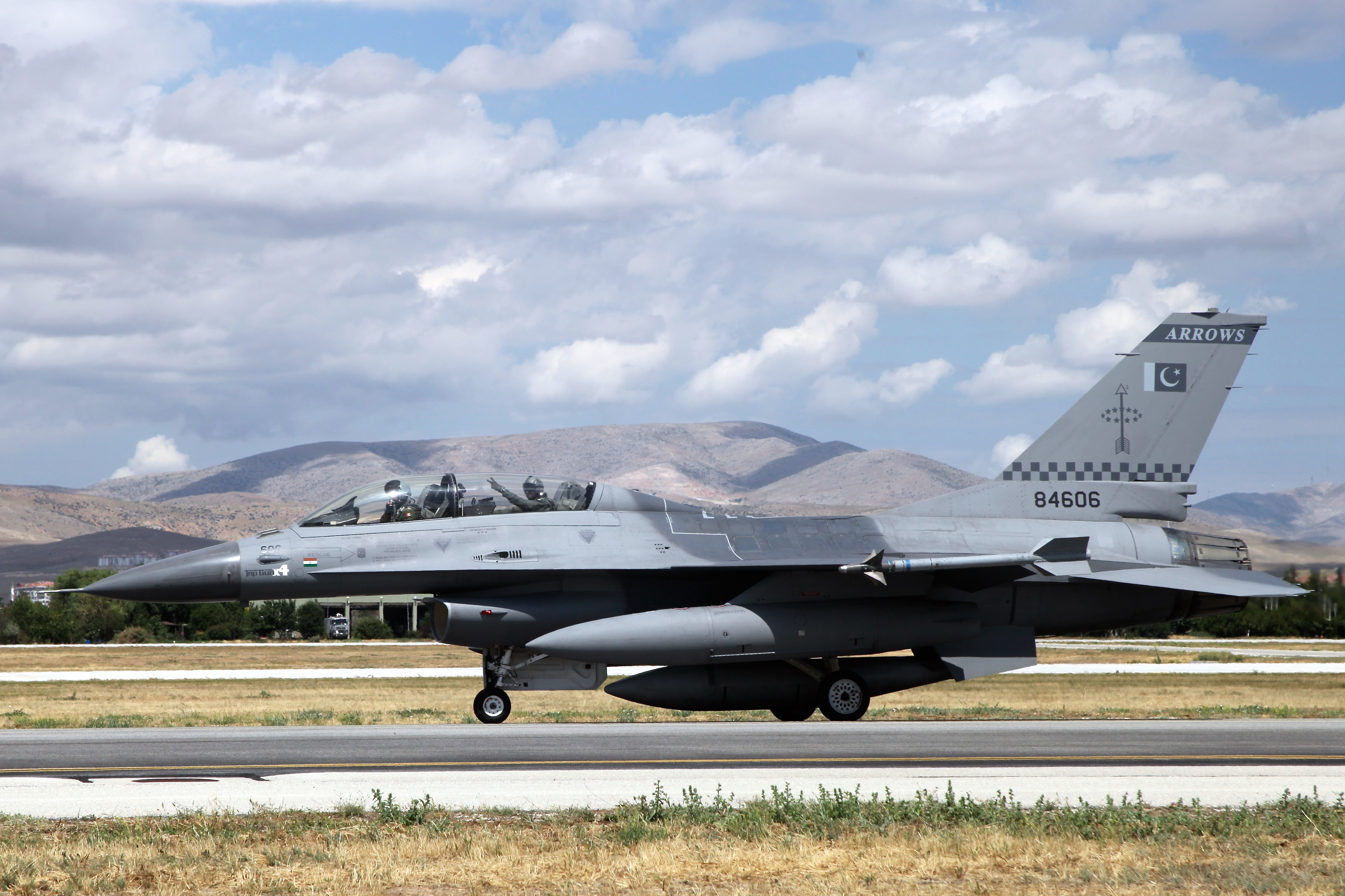
An F-16BM (serial no. 84606) from the No. 11 Squadron 'Arrows' of the Pakistan Air Force with an Indian flag on its nose as a kill mark signifying its shoot-down of an Indian Air Force MiG-21 during Operation Swift Retort in 2019.

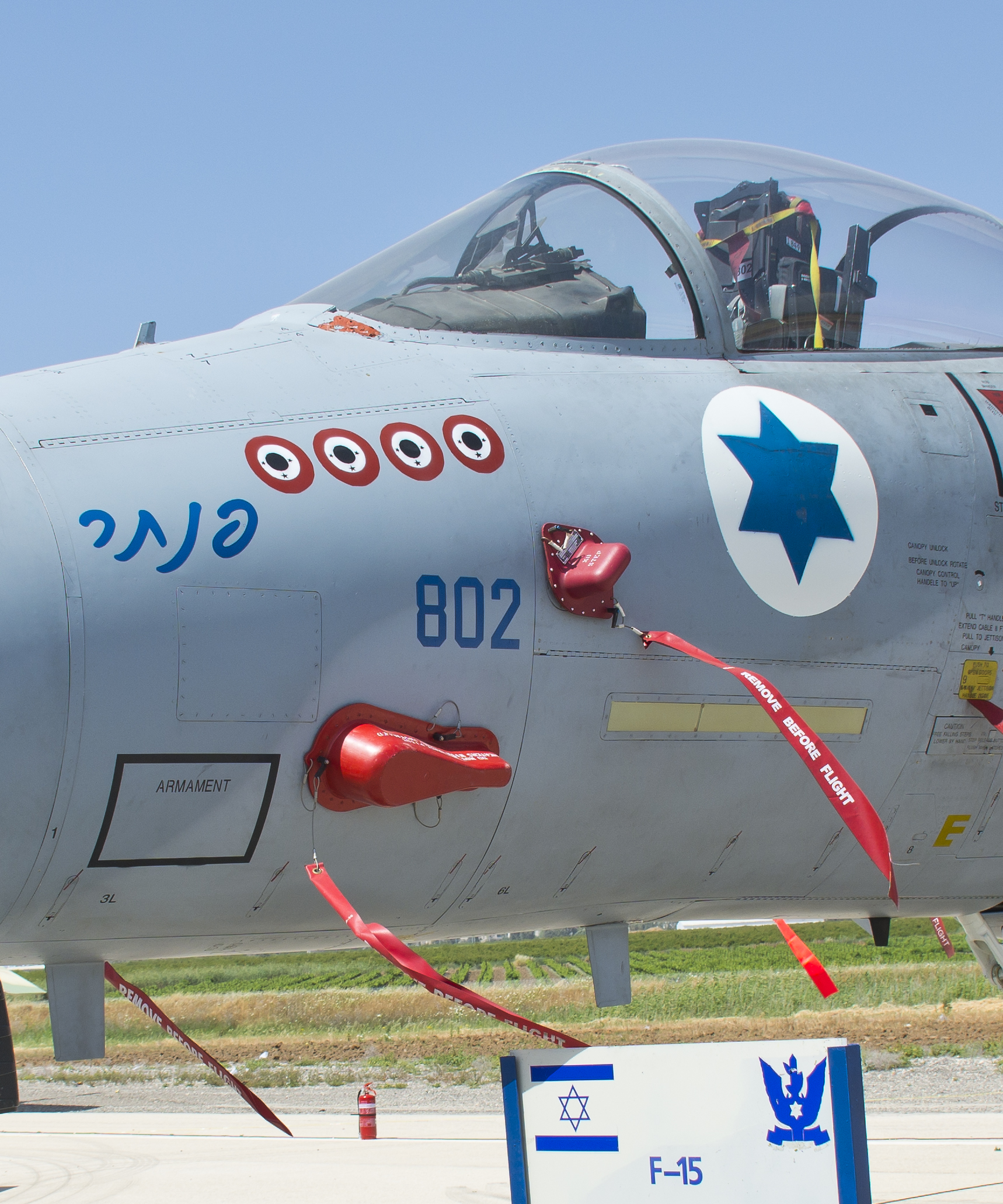
McDonnell Douglas F-15 Eagle of the Israeli Air Force showing 4 kill marks for aerial victories over Syrian pilots in the 1982 Lebanon War.

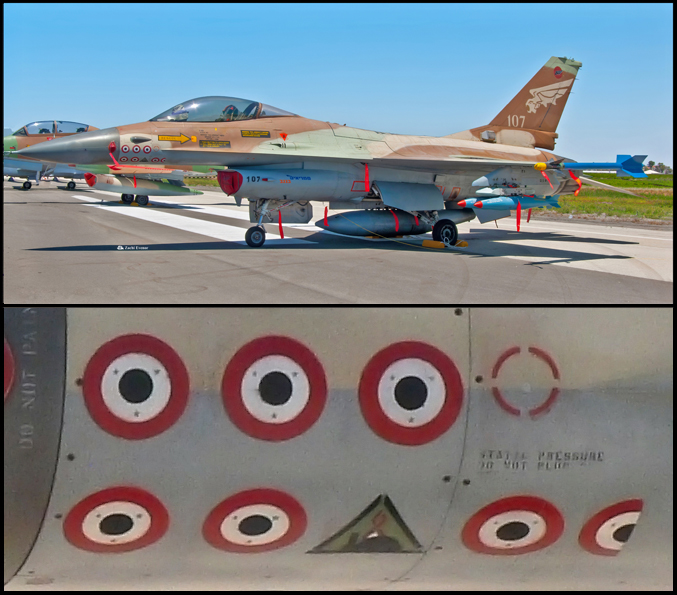
F-16A Netz 107 of the Israeli Air Force. Netz 107 has an unmatched combat record in the IDF: it destroyed the Iraqi Osirak nuclear reactor as part of Operation Opera in 1981, and was credited with 6.5 enemy aircraft kills in 1982 (one was a joint interception with another Israeli fighter).

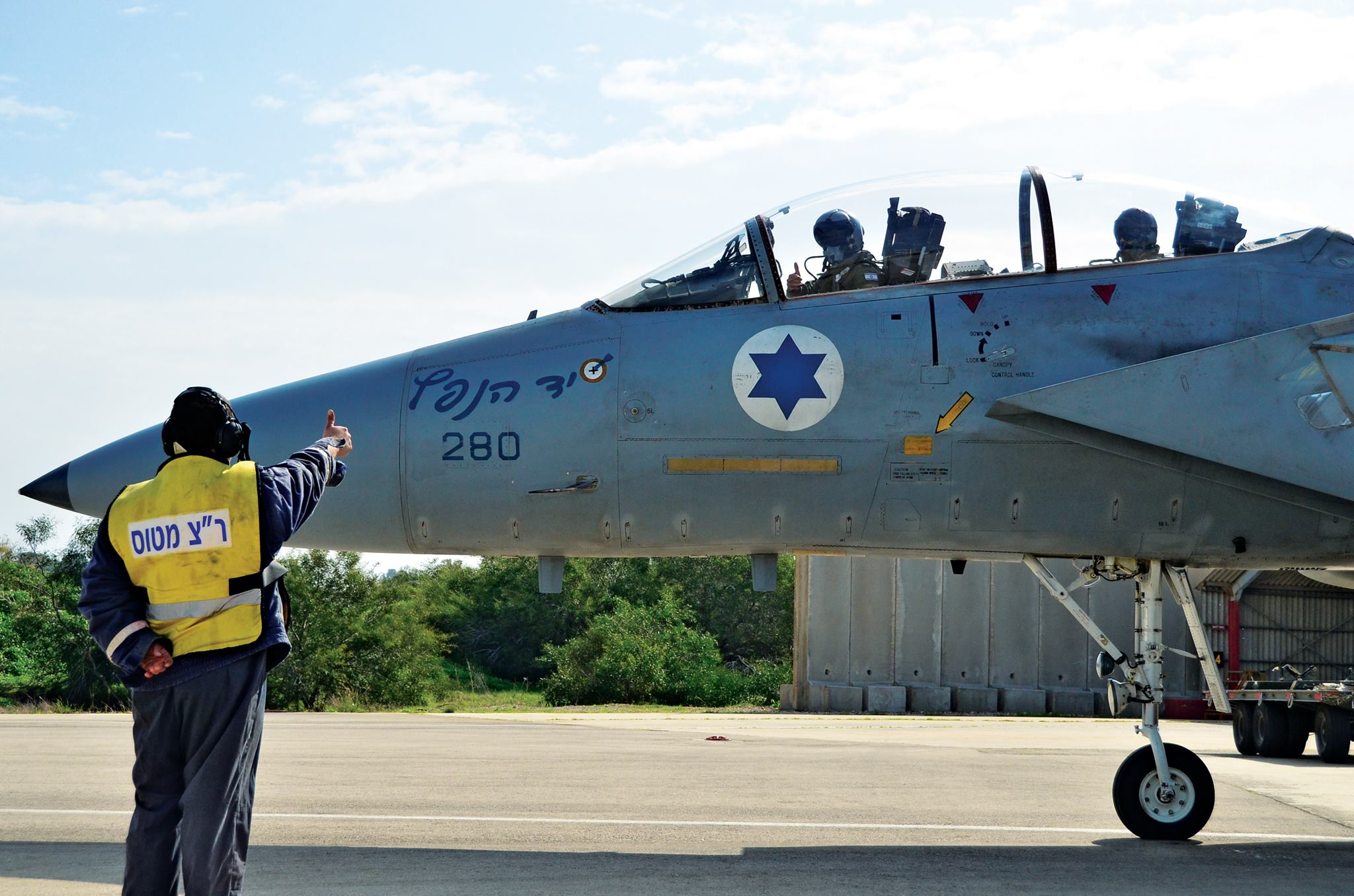
IAF McDonnell Douglas F-15D Yad Ha Nefetz (Shatterhand) with Operation Wooden Leg success marking

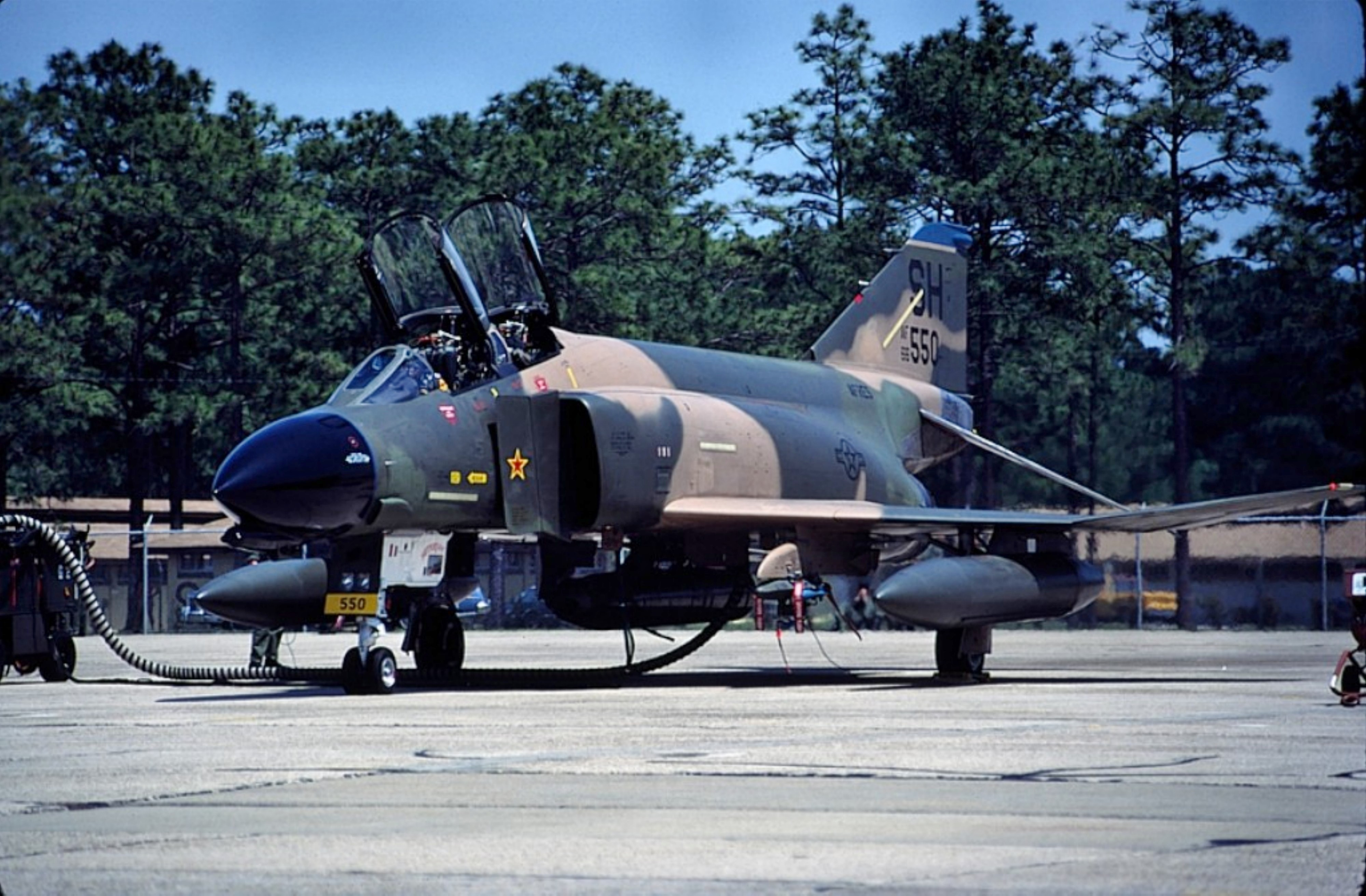
An U.S. Air Force McDonnell Douglas F-4 Phantom II pictured at Tinker Air Force Base. On its intake splitter-plate is a kill mark in the form of a red star, signifying an aerial victory achieved during the Vietnam War.

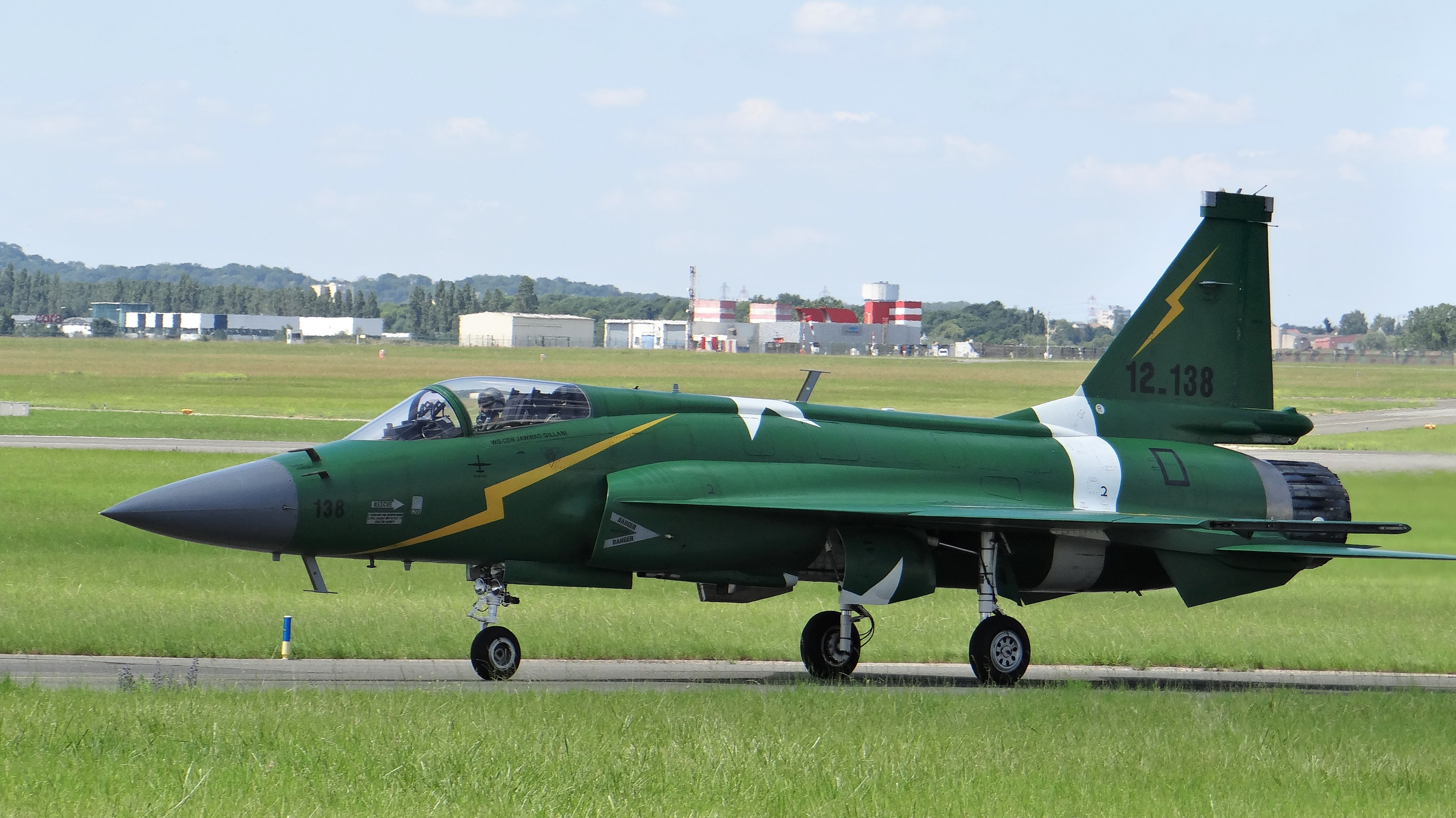
A Pakistan Air Force demo team JF-17 Thunder with an Iranian drone kill mark on the nose which it shot down in 2017.

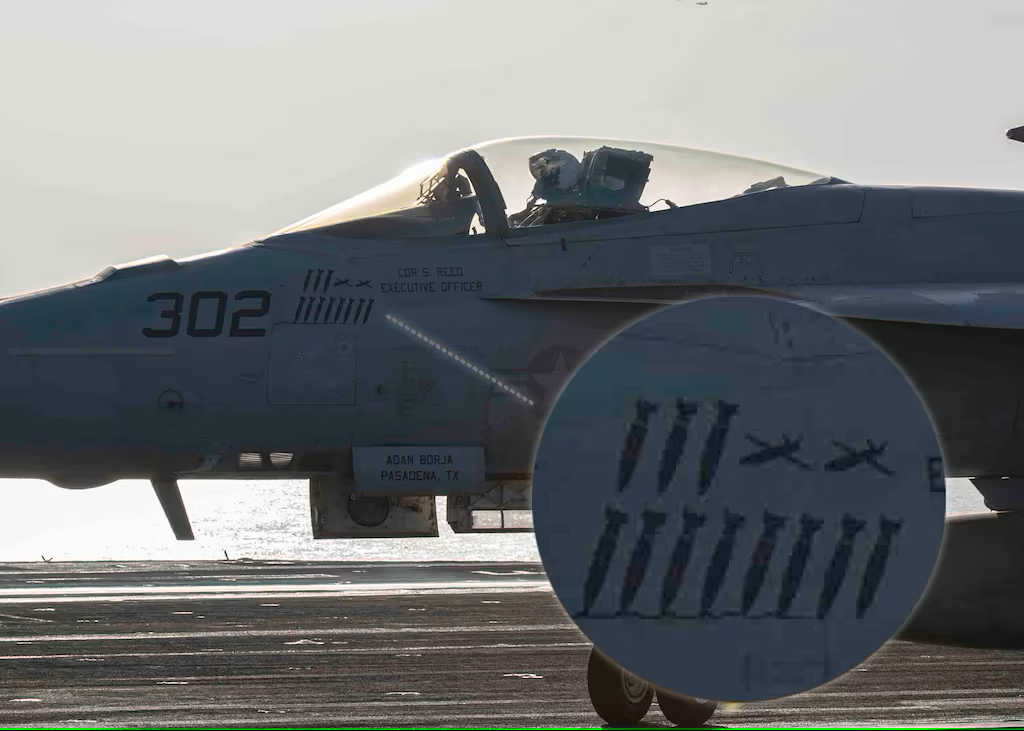
Drone kill victory marks on an F/A-18 Hornet against Houthi rebels in Yemen on the USS Dwight D. Eisenhower

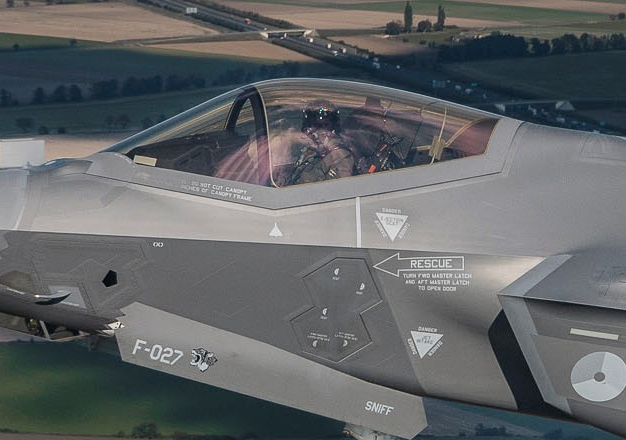
A Shahed-type drone shot down during the Russian drone incursion into Poland marked on a Dutch Air Force F-35 Lightning II

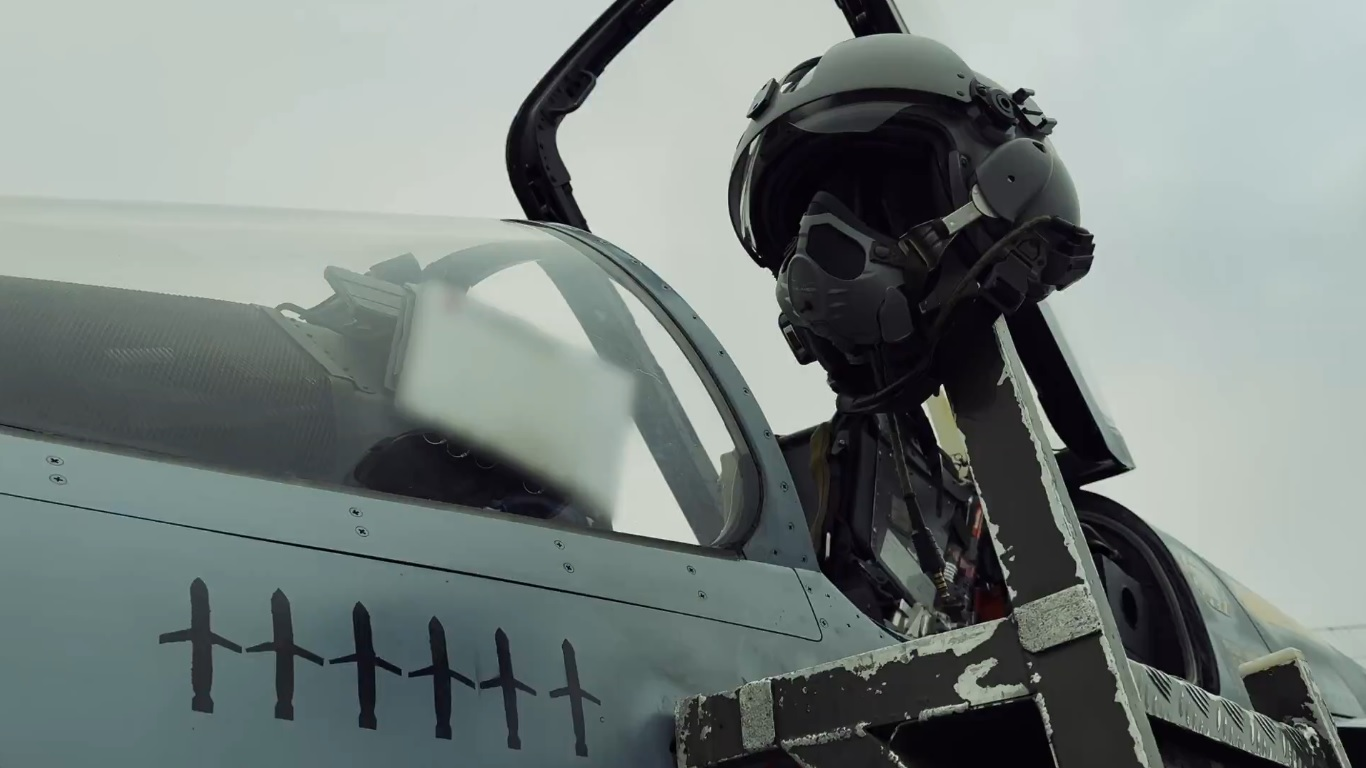
Six Kh-101 cruise missile kill victory marks on a Ukrainian Air Force Mirage 2000-5F

== See also ==
- Flying ace
- Nose art
- A feather in your cap
