= Kaplonosy =

- Village
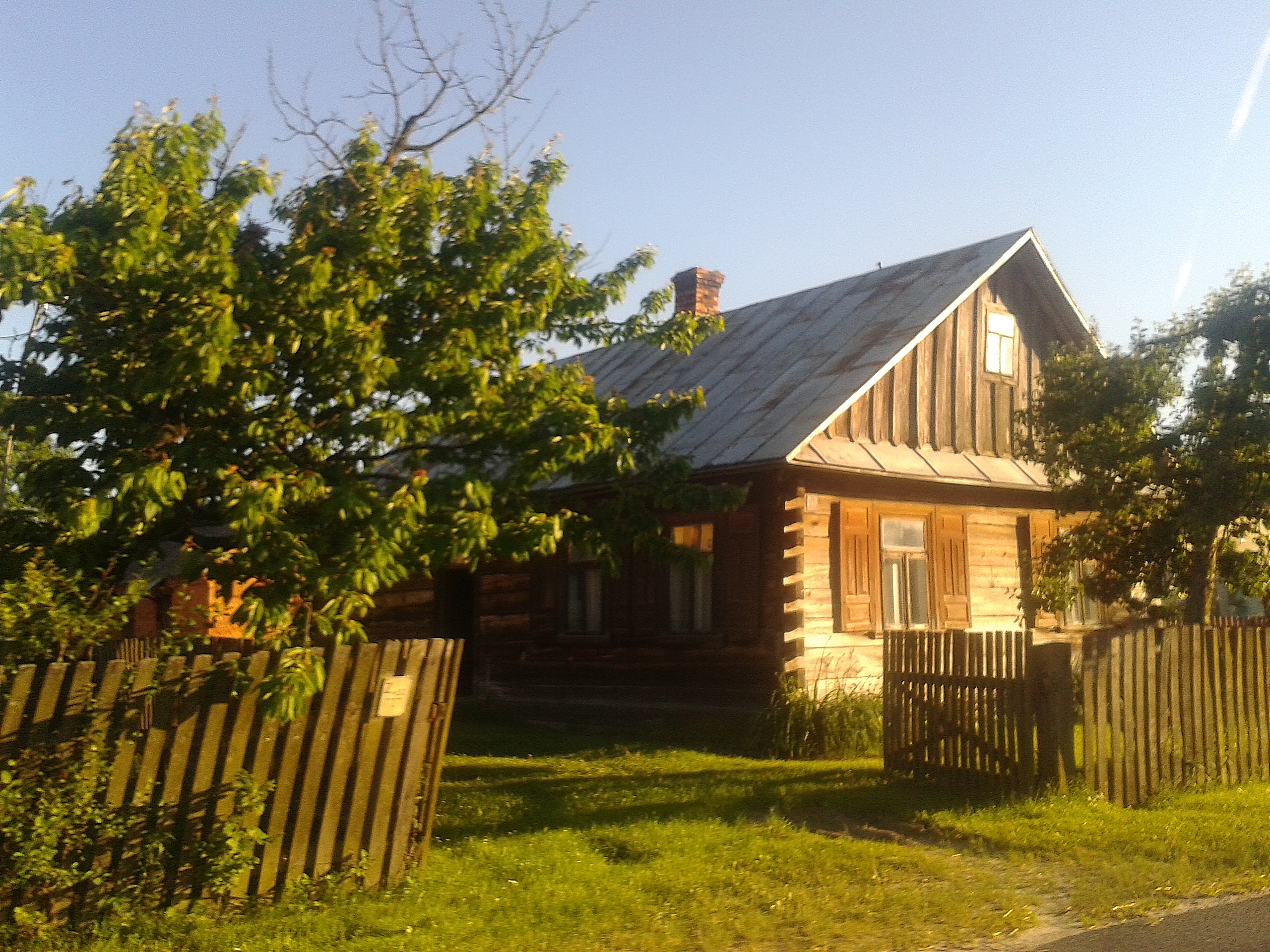
- Wooden house in Kaplonosy

- Location within Poland
- Coordinates: 51°36′N 23°21′E
- Country: Poland
- Voivodeship: Lublin
- County: Włodawa
- Gmina: Wyryki

Population
  - Total: 301
- Time zone: UTC+1 (CET)
  - Summer (DST): UTC+2 (CEST)
- Vehicle registration: LWL

Kaplonosy [kaplɔˈnɔsɨ] is a village in the administrative district of Gmina Wyryki, within Włodawa County, Lublin Voivodeship, in eastern Poland.
