= Battle of Cześniki =

- Part of the Invasion of Poland
Date	September 21–22, 1939
Location	Cześniki, Lublin Voivodeship, Poland 50°42′18″N 23°26′29″E
Result	Tactical Polish victory

Belligerents
Germany	Poland

Commanders and leaders
(Nazi Germany) Wilhelm List (Nazi Germany) Friedrich Bergmann	(Second Polish Republic) Stefan Dąb-Biernacki (Second Polish Republic) Bruno Olbrycht

Strength
27th Infantry Division; 4th Light Division	39th Infantry Division

Casualties and losses
~200 killed ~600 wounded 100 captured 150 vehicles captured	~200 killed 600 wounded

The Battle of Cześniki took place on 21 and 22 September 1939 during the German and Soviet invasion of Poland, around the village of Cześniki near Zamość. It was an armed engagement between the Polish reserve 39th Infantry Division and a large German detachment of the 14th Army, comprising the 27th Infantry Division and 4th Light Division.

== Outcome ==
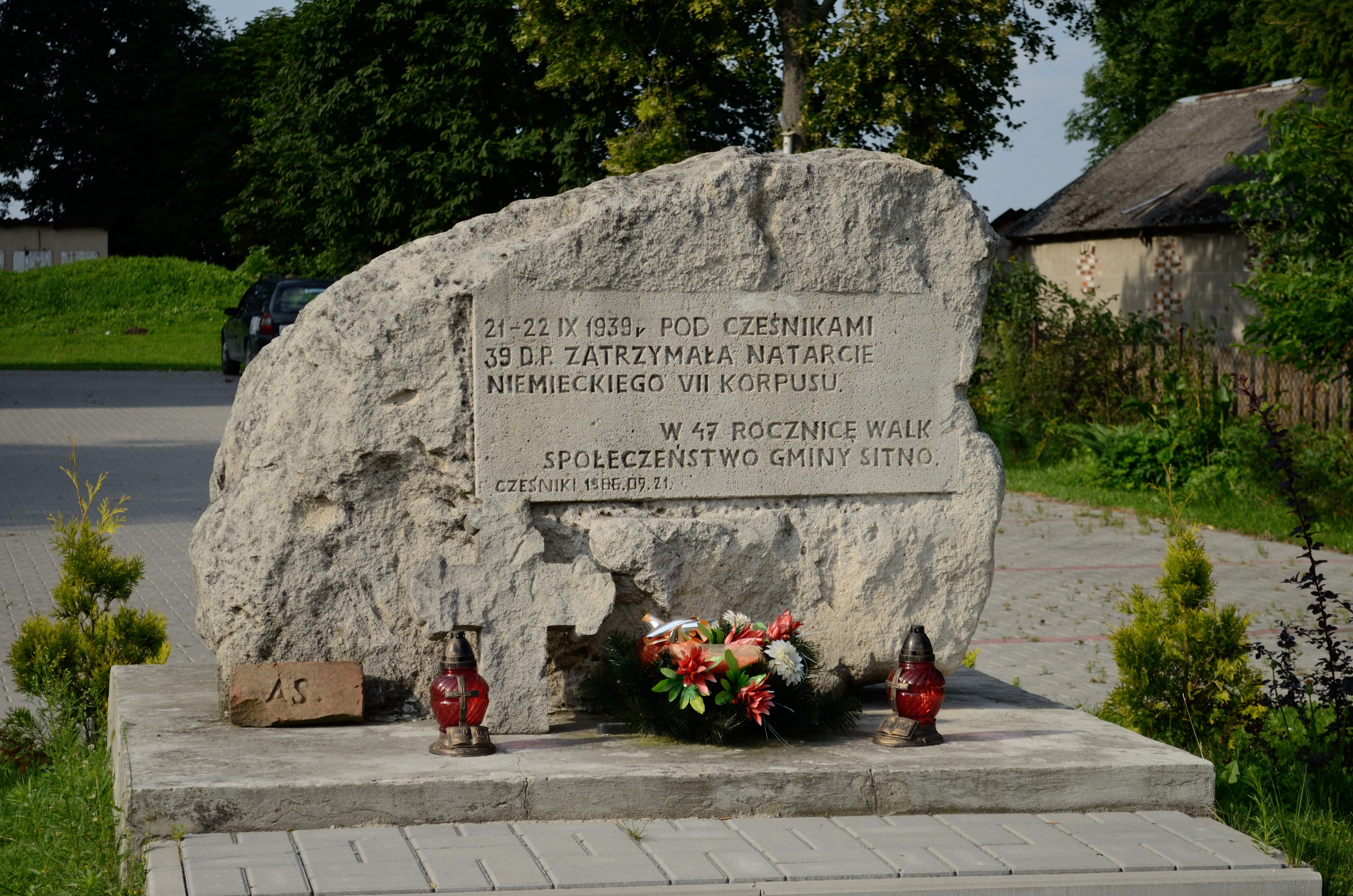
Cześniki monument to battle

The result of the battle was inconclusive, though the Polish units successfully forced the Germans to retreat and broke through on their way from Zamość towards the Hungarian border. However, instead of breaking through towards Hungary, the division was ordered to attack towards the besieged city of Lwów. The 39th Division reached Tomaszów Lubelski but was destroyed in the Second Battle of Tomaszów several days later.

Both sides suffered similar losses: approximately 200 killed and 600 wounded. The Poles took some 100 Germans prisoner and captured about 150 motor vehicles and motorcycles.

== See also ==
- List of World War II military equipment of Poland
- List of German military equipment of World War II
