= Czosnówka =

- Village
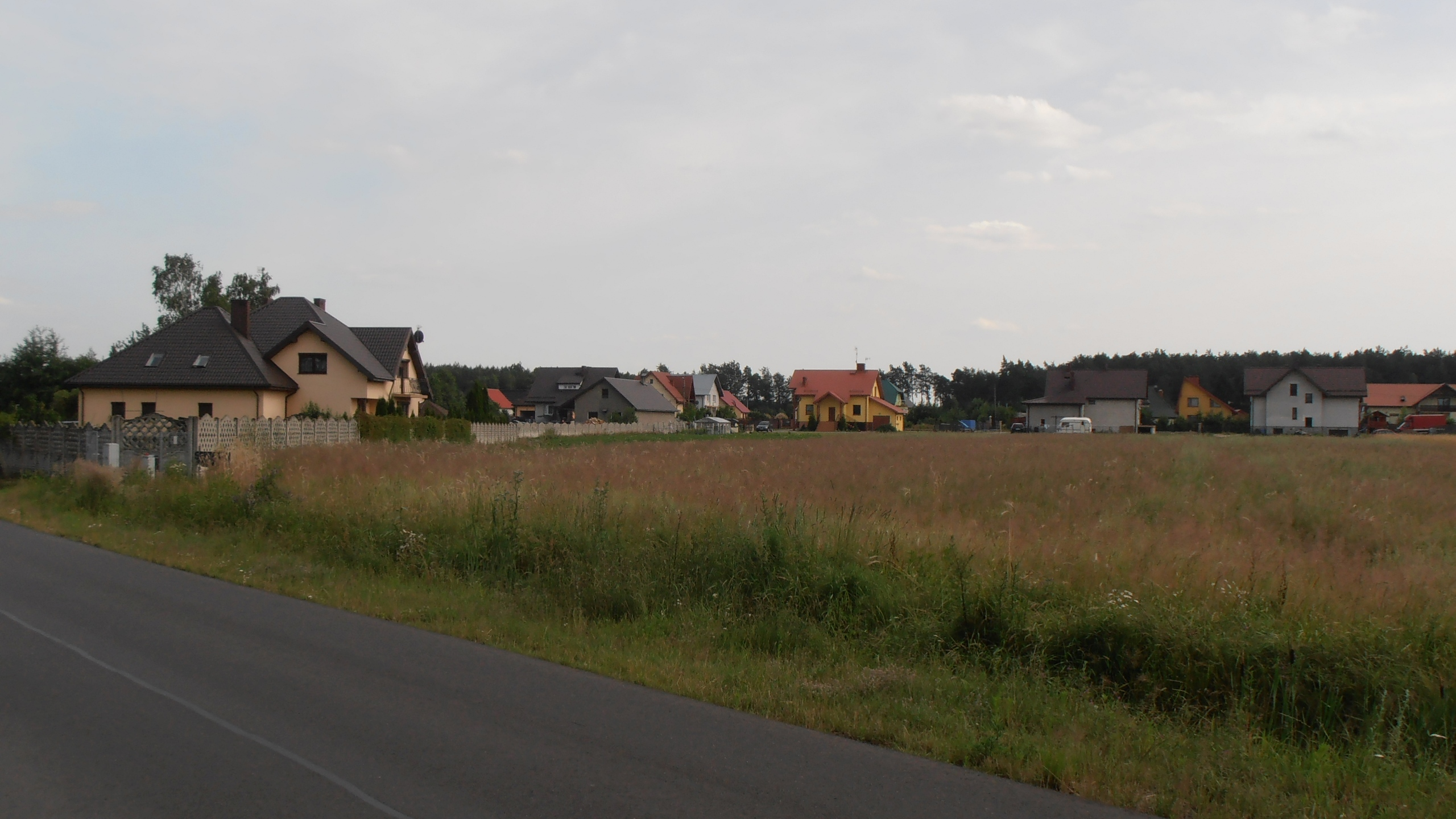
- View of the village in 2014

- Location within Poland
- Coordinates: 52°0′N 23°13′E
- Country: Poland
- Voivodeship: Lublin
- County: Biała
- Gmina: Biała Podlaska
- Elevation: 140 m (460 ft)

Population
  - Total: 700
- Time zone: UTC+1 (CET)
  - Summer (DST): UTC+2 (CEST)
- Postal code: 21-500
- Vehicle registration: LBI

Czosnówka [t͡ʂɔsˈnufka] is a village in the administrative district of Gmina Biała Podlaska, within Biała County, Lublin Voivodeship, in eastern Poland.

== History ==
In 1827, the village had a population of 161.

In the interwar period, it was administratively located in Gmina Sidorki in the Biała Podlaska County in the Lublin Voivodeship of Poland. According to the 1921 census, the village with the adjacent manor farm had a population of 282, entirely Polish by nationality.

Following the German-Soviet invasion of Poland, which started World War II in September 1939, the village was occupied by Nazi Germany until 1944. The German occupying administration operated a forced labour camp for Jews in the village.
