= Wyryki-Adampol =

- Village
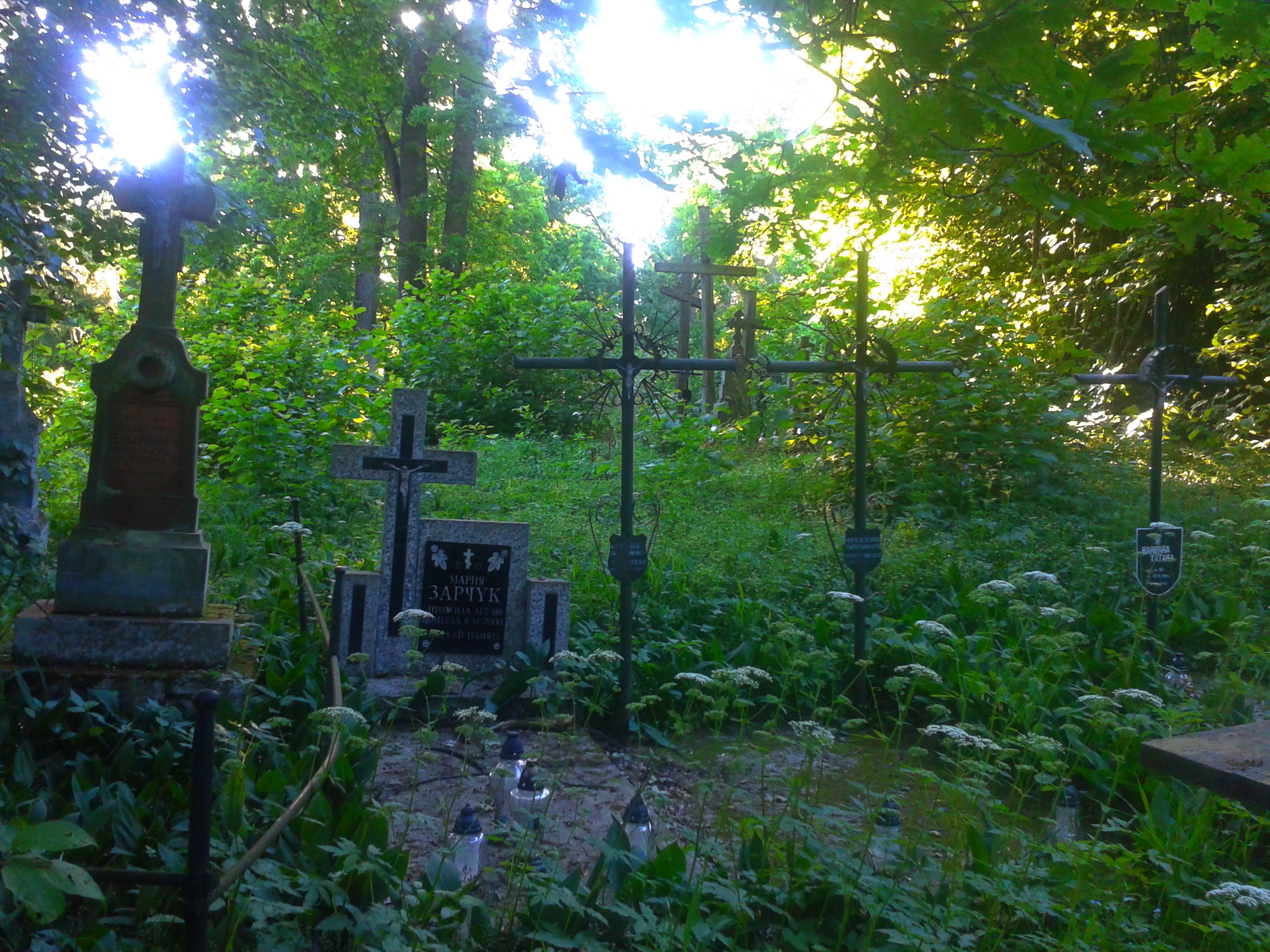

- Location within Poland
- Coordinates: 51°33′40″N 23°23′47″E
- Country: Poland
- Voivodeship: Lublin
- County: Włodawa
- Gmina: Wyryki
- Time zone: UTC+1 (CET)
  - Summer (DST): UTC+2 (CEST)
- Vehicle registration: LWL

Wyryki-Adampol [vɨˈrɨki aˈdampɔl] is a village in the administrative district of Gmina Wyryki, within Włodawa County, Lublin Voivodeship, in eastern Poland.

== History ==
Following the German-Soviet invasion of Poland, which started World War II in September 1939, the village was occupied by Nazi Germany until 1944. The German occupying administration operated a forced labour camp for Jews in the village.
