= Krzywowierzba-Kolonia =

- Village
- Location within Poland
- Coordinates: 51°36′N 23°08′E
- Country: Poland
- Voivodeship: Lublin
- County: Parczew
- Gmina: Dębowa Kłoda

Krzywowierzba-Kolonia [kʂɨvɔˈvjɛʐba kɔˈlɔɲa] is a village in the administrative district of Gmina Dębowa Kłoda, within Parczew County, Lublin Voivodeship, in eastern Poland.
