= Zapad 2025 =

Russian–Belarusian joint strategic military exercise

- Part of Russian military presence and Cooperation in Belarus during the Belarusian involvement in the Russo Ukrainian war (Current phase)
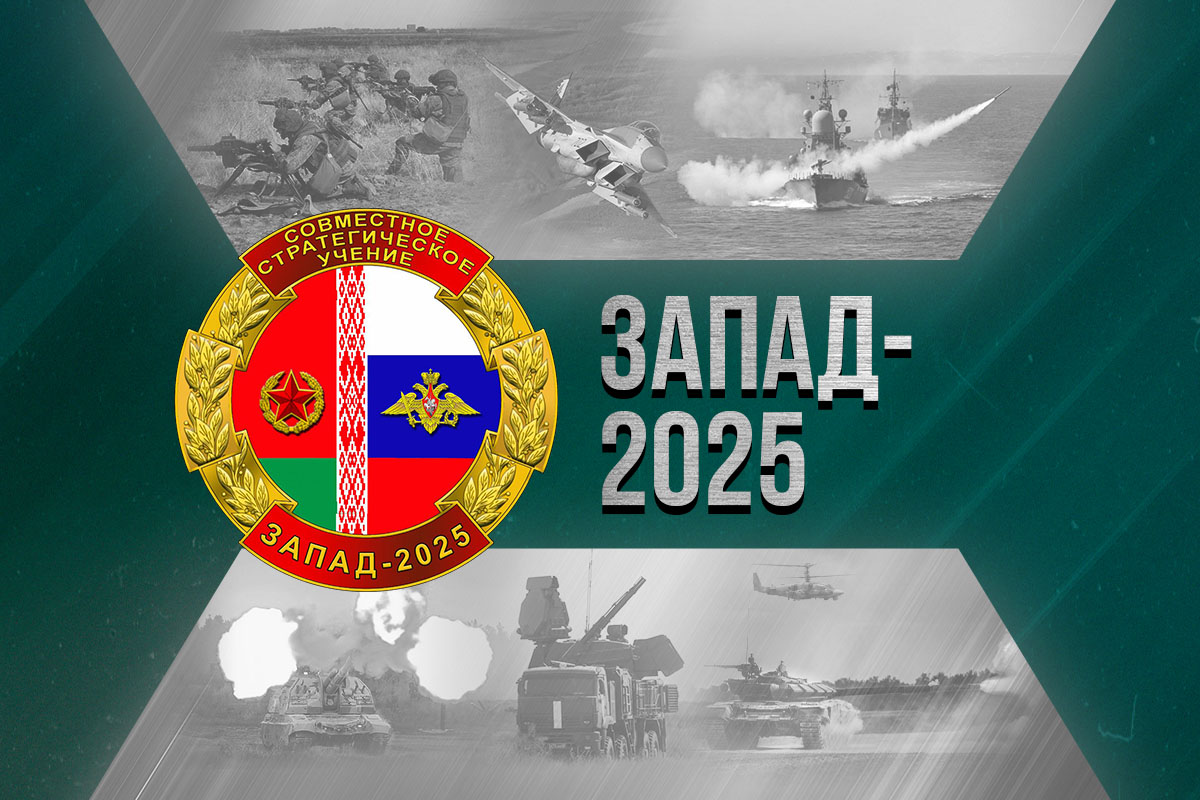
- Date: September 12–16, 2025 (final phase)
- Location: Belarus, Russia

Number
~13,000	

Zapad 2025 (Russian: Запад-2025, Belarusian: Захад-2025, romanized: Zakhad-2025, lit. 'West 2025') was a Russian-Belarusian joint strategic military exercise, that took place in Belarus on 12–16 September 2025. Belarus has said the drills will test the Union State's defensive readiness, with main activities staged at central training areas near Barysaw and a reciprocal movement of units between the two states. It was the first Zapad exercise since Russia's full-scale invasion of Ukraine in 2022; authorities described a scaled-down format and locations deeper inside Belarus.

Belarus has indicated an official participation figure of roughly 13,000 personnel, substantially fewer than the ~200,000 claimed for Zapad 2021. Analysts noted that headline figures in past iterations sometimes understate the true scale and dispersal of activity; some commentaries anticipated higher effective numbers across parallel events. The exercises were conducted on multiple bases in Belarus and Russia, including the Kaliningrad oblast enclave.

Belarusian officials said the exercise would include training related to nuclear weapons employment and practice involving Russia's Oreshnik missile system, described as nuclear-capable and slated for delivery to Belarus by late 2025.

Minsk stated that it had invited all 56 states under the OSCE Vienna Document to observe, plus additional partners, including NATO countries and accredited military attachés, with responses requested by 20 August 2025. Military observers from three NATO member states participated in the exercises. The United States were represented by two military observers, while Turkey and Hungary, also NATO members, each sent their respective representatives.

== Participants ==
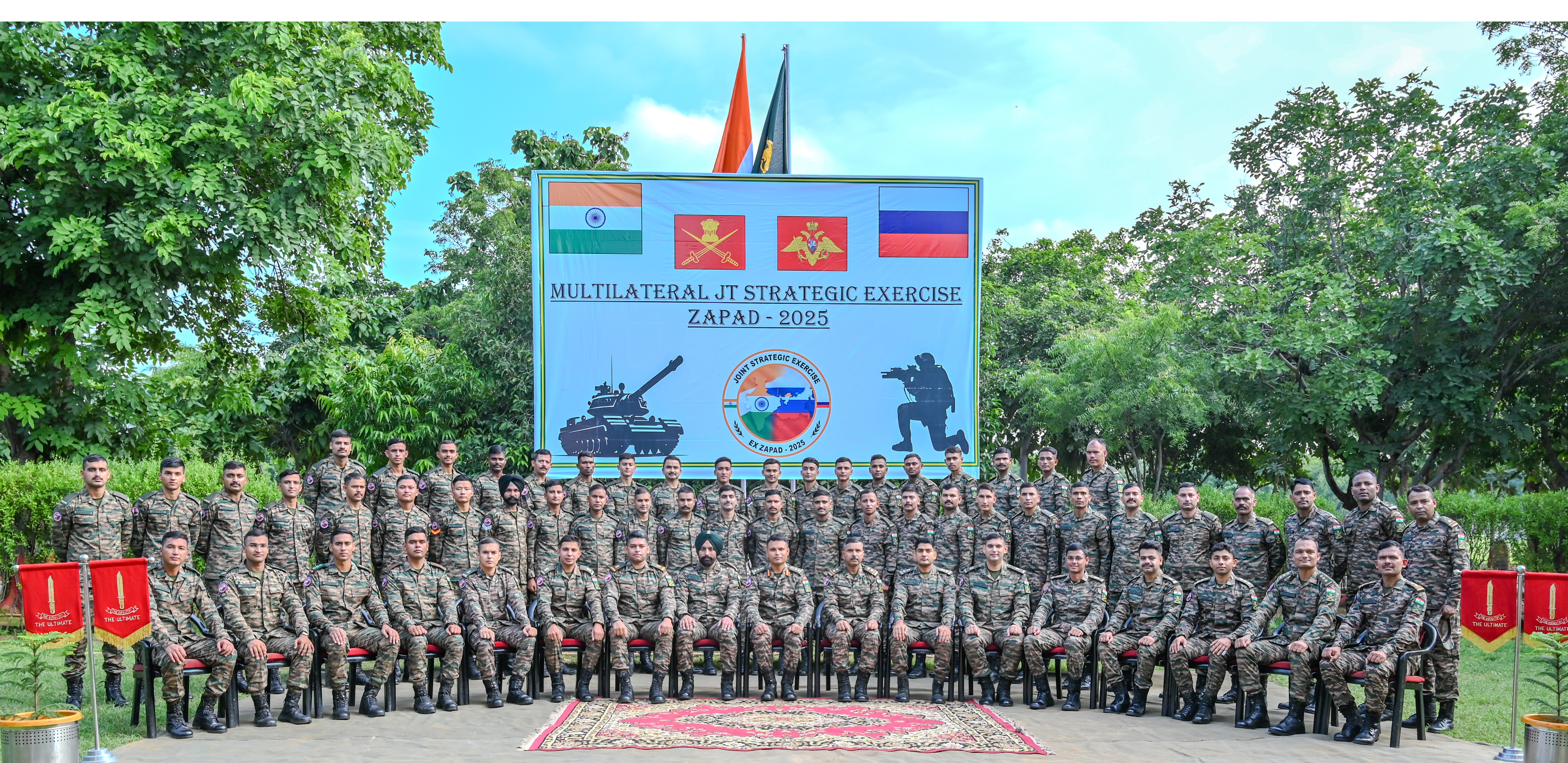
Indian personnel departs to participate in Zapad 2025 military exercise

The edition of the exercise saw the participation of over twenty countries including, besides Russia and Belarus, Bangladesh, Burkina Faso, Congo, Mali, India, Iran, Niger and Tajikistan. Among the observers were Cambodia, China, Cuba, Kazakhstan, Mongolia, Myanmar, Nicaragua, North Korea, Pakistan, Serbia, Thailand, the UAE and Uzbekistan.

A 65-member contingent from the Indian Armed Forces was participating in the exercise, and on 9 September 2025, it departed to Mulino Training Ground, Nizhniy Novgorod, Russia. A 57 personnel team of the Indian Army was led by a battalion from the Kumaon Regiment, the Indian Air Force and the Indian Navy was represented by seven and one personnel, respectively. The exercise focused on company-level cooperation in an open and plain terrain.

== Reactions ==
EU analysts warned Zapad-2025 could be used to apply pressure near NATO's eastern flank or serve as cover for escalation, even if the exercise is officially presented as defensive. Some commentary also highlights the recurring pattern of public participant counts hovering near thresholds that would otherwise compel mandatory observation under the Vienna Document.

On 9 September 2025, Polish Prime Minister Donald Tusk announced that Poland would close its border with Belarus at midnight on 11 September, citing national security concerns over aggressive military tactics that were to take place near the Polish border during the Zapad-2025 exercises. Polish Interior Minister Marcin Kierwiński said the border would only be reopened when the government was certain that there was no longer a threat to Polish citizens. NATO and neighboring countries like Lithuania have also strengthened their border security in response to the exercises. Relations between Poland and Belarus have been increasingly strained since the Russian invasion of Ukraine in 2022, with both countries recently arresting each other's nationals on espionage charges, further escalating tensions. Belarus condemned the closure, describing it as an "abuse" of Poland's geographic position. The border was closed on 12 September.

Lithuania closed the airspace near the border with Belarus, and Latvia closed the airspace near the border with Belarus and Russia, in connection with the Zapad exercises. Polish airspace adjacent to the Belarusian border was subject to flight restrictions on September 10. Airspace closures were partly caused by the Russian drone incursion into Poland.

On 11 September, the day before of the exercises, Lukashenko released and deported to Lithuania 52 political prisoners after negotiations with the Trump administration, including one of the Belarusian opposition leaders Mikola Statkevich, who refused the deportation. Nathan Hodge of CNN notes that "against the background of Zapad and its attendant saber-rattling, Lukashenko may be playing good cop to Putin's bad cop".

== European exercises ==
Simultaneously with Zapad 2025, the Joint Expeditionary Force running its own military exercise in the Baltic sea, TARASSIS, in which eleven countries participate. Poland is running the "Iron Defender" exercises which involves more than 30 thousand Polish personnel near the Polish-Belarusian border; Lithuania run their "Perkūno Griausmas 2025" ("Thunder of Perkūnas 2025") exercises with more than 17 thousand personnel involved; and Latvia runs its "Namejs 2025" exercises with more than 12 thousand people involved.

== See also ==
- List of Zapad exercises
- Russian military presence in Belarus
- 2025 Russian drone incursion into Poland
- Belarus–European Union border crisis
- Belarus–Poland border barrier
