= Wyryki-Wola =

- Village
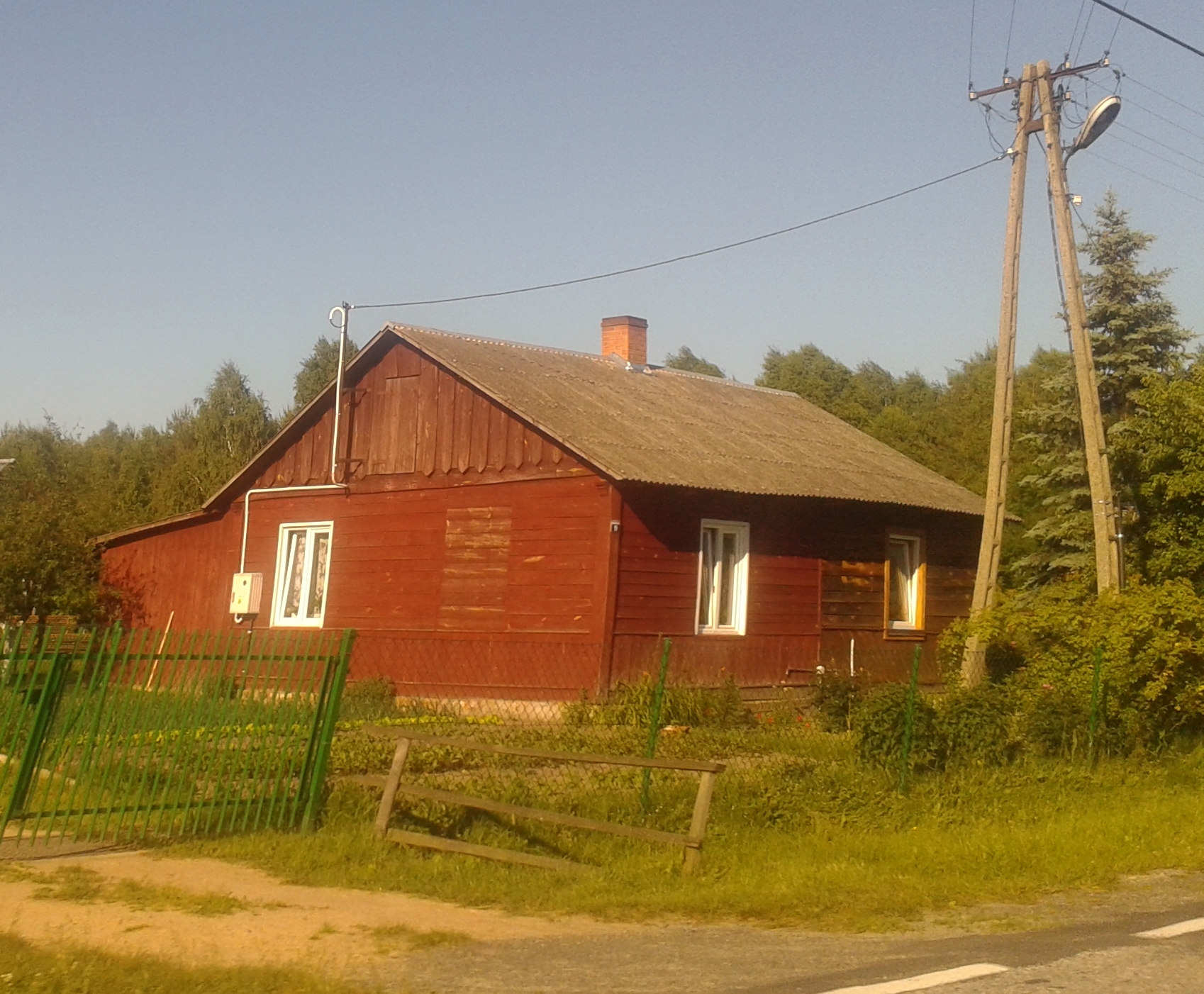
- Wooden house in Wyryki-Wola

- Location within Poland
- Coordinates: 51°33′44″N 23°21′52″E
- Country: Poland
- Voivodeship: Lublin
- County: Włodawa
- Gmina: Wyryki
- Time zone: UTC+1 (CET)
  - Summer (DST): UTC+2 (CEST)
- Vehicle registration: LWL

Wyryki-Wola [vɨˈrɨki ˈvɔla] is a village in the administrative district of Gmina Wyryki, within Włodawa County, Lublin Voivodeship, in eastern Poland.

In September 2025, an AIM-120 AMRAAM missile fired at a Russian Gerbera drone by a Polish F-16 fighter went astray and struck a residential building which destroyed the roof in Wyryki-Wola, during the Russian drone incursion into Poland.
