= Cześniki =

- Village
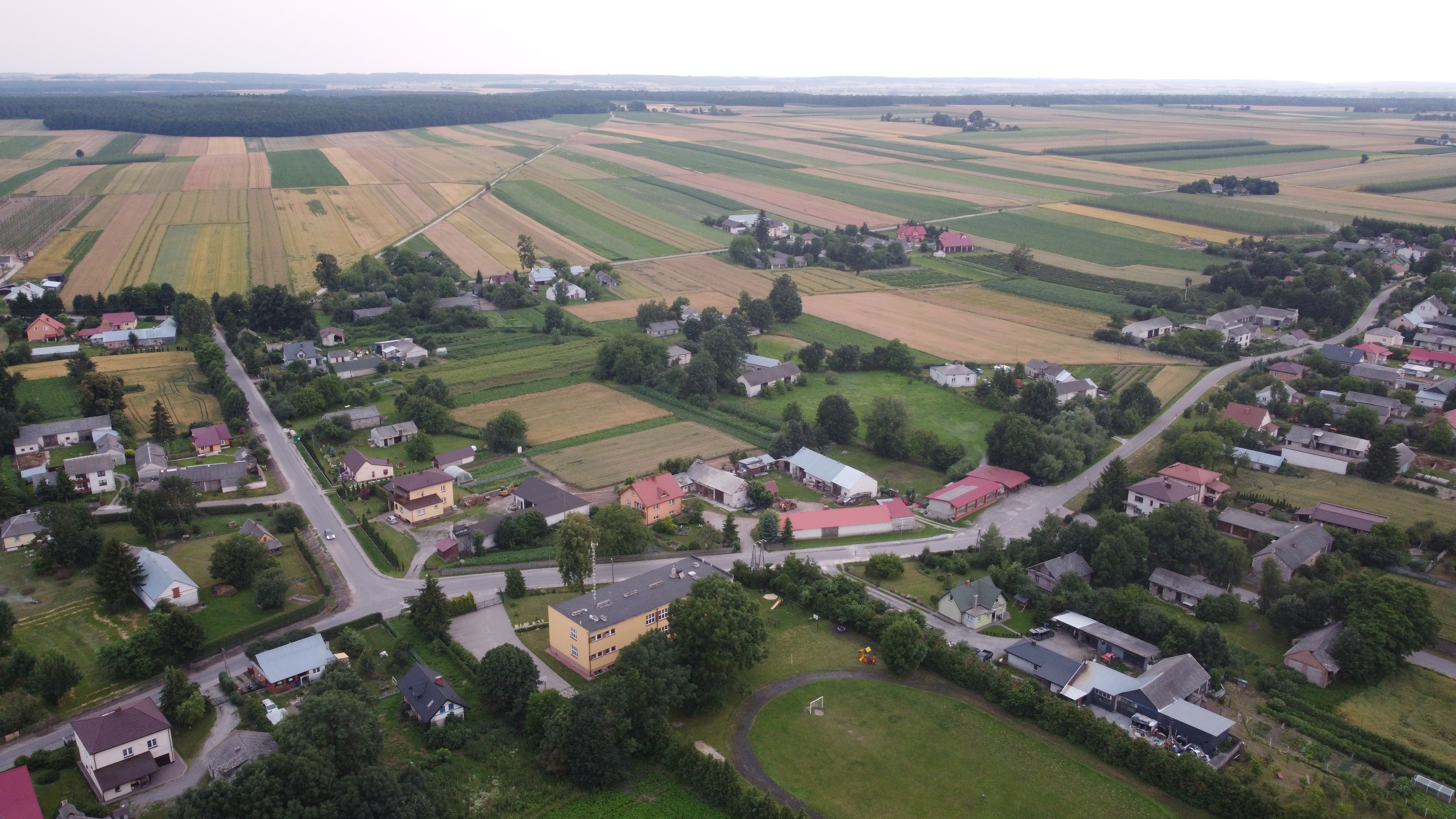
- Aerial view of Cześniki

- Location within Poland
- Coordinates: 50°43′N 23°27′E
- Country: Poland
- Voivodeship: Lublin
- County: Zamość
- Gmina: Sitno

Population
  - Total: 1,460
- Time zone: UTC+1 (CET)
  - Summer (DST): UTC+2 (CEST)
- Vehicle registration: LZA

Cześniki [t͡ʂɛɕˈniki] is a village in the administrative district of Gmina Sitno, within Zamość County, Lublin Voivodeship, in eastern Poland.

== History ==
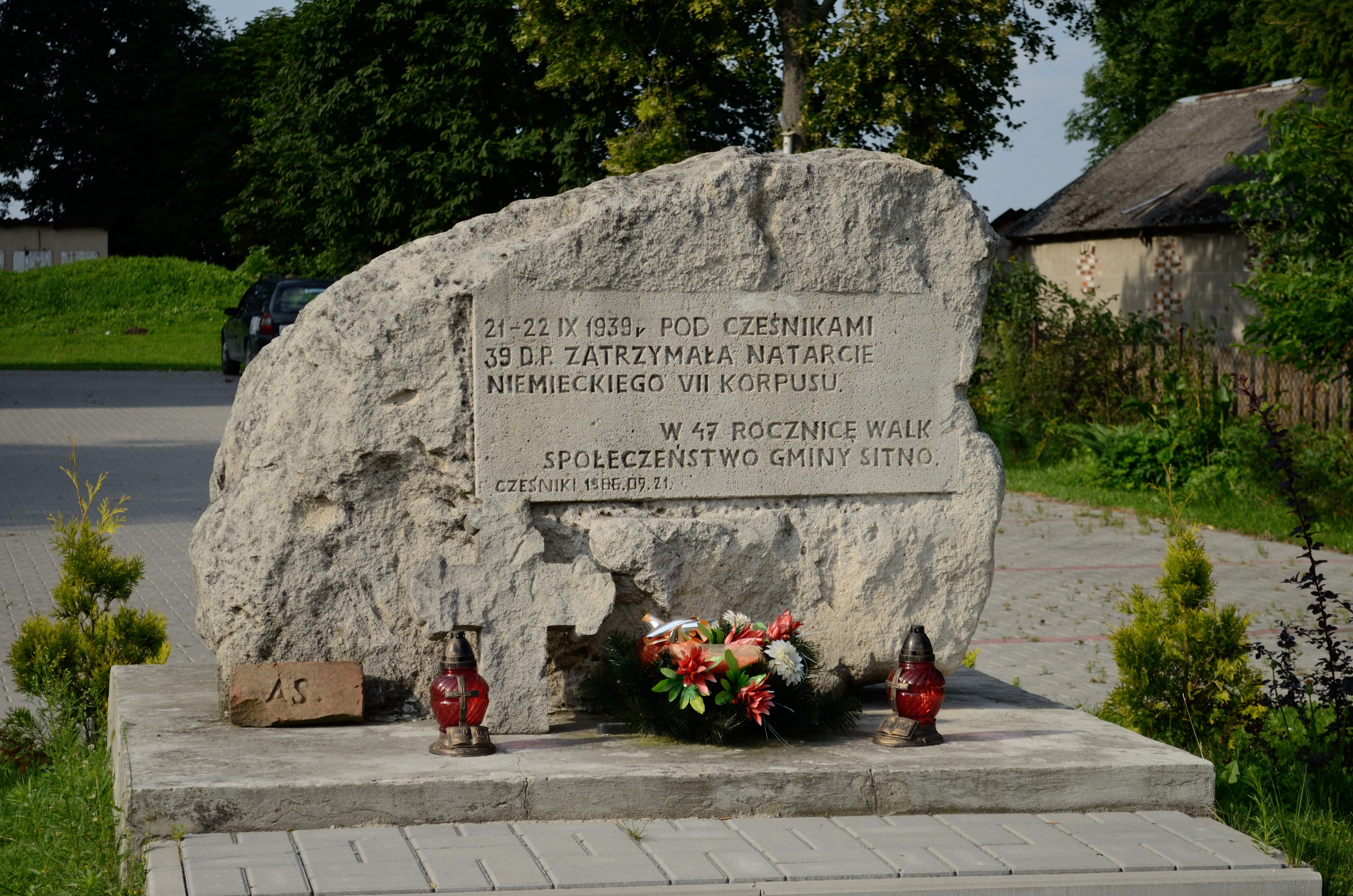
War memorial

During the German-Soviet invasion of Poland at the start of World War II, on 21–22 September 1939, it was the site of the Battle of Cześniki, which ended in a tactical Polish victory against the German invaders. Two Polish citizens were murdered by Nazi Germany in the village during World War II.
