= Wyryki-Połód =

- Village
- Location within Poland
- Coordinates: 51°33′N 23°23′E
- Country: Poland
- Voivodeship: Lublin
- County: Włodawa
- Gmina: Wyryki

Population
  - Total: 397
- Time zone: UTC+1 (CET)
  - Summer (DST): UTC+2 (CEST)
- Vehicle registration: LWL

Wyryki-Połód [vɨˈrɨki pɔˈwud] is a village in Włodawa County, Lublin Voivodeship, in eastern Poland.. It is the seat of the gmina (administrative district) called Gmina Wyryki
