= Wyryki-Kolonia =

- Village
- Location within Poland
- Coordinates: 51°34′N 23°23′E
- Country: Poland
- Voivodeship: Lublin
- County: Włodawa
- Gmina: Wyryki

Population
  - Total: 68
- Time zone: UTC+1 (CET)
  - Summer (DST): UTC+2 (CEST)
- Vehicle registration: LWL

Wyryki-Kolonia [vɨˈrɨki kɔˈlɔɲa] (until December 31, 2019 Wyryki) is a village in Włodawa County, Lublin Voivodeship, in eastern Poland.
