= Gmina Wyryki =

Gmina Wyryki Wyryki Commune
- Gmina
- Interactive map of Gmina Wyryki
- Coordinates (Wyryki): 51°34′N 23°23′E
- Country: Poland
- Voivodeship: Lublin
- County: Włodawa
- Seat: Wyryki-Połód

Area
  - Total: 219.52 km^{2} (84.76 sq mi)

Population (2006)
  - Total: 2,822
  - Density: 12.86/km^{2} (33.30/sq mi)

Gmina Wyryki is a rural gmina (administrative district) in Włodawa County, Lublin Voivodeship, in eastern Poland. Its seat is the village of Wyryki-Połód, which lies approximately 12 kilometres (7 mi) west of Włodawa and 67 km (42 mi) north-east of the regional capital Lublin.

The gmina covers an area of 219.52 square kilometres (84.8 sq mi), and as of 2006 its total population is 2,822.

== Villages ==
Gmina Wyryki contains the villages and settlements of Adampol, Horostyta, Horostyta-Kolonia, Ignaców, Kaplonosy, Kaplonosy-Kolonia, Krzywowierzba, Lipówka, Lubień, Siedliska, Suchawa, Wyryki-Kolonia, Wyryki-Adampol, Wyryki-Połód, Wyryki-Wola, Zahajki and Zahajki-Kolonia.

== Neighbouring gminas ==
Gmina Wyryki is bordered by the town of Włodawa and by the gminas of Dębowa Kłoda, Hanna, Hańsk, Podedwórze, Sosnówka, Stary Brus and Włodawa.
