= Triton =

Triton commonly refers to:

- Triton (mythology), a Greek god
- Triton (moon), a satellite of Neptune

Triton may also refer to:

== Biology ==
- Triton cockatoo, a parrot
- Triton (gastropod), a group of sea snails
- Triton, a synonym of Triturus, a genus of newts

== Characters and mascots ==
=== Characters ===
- King Triton, a character in The Little Mermaid
- Luke Triton, a character in Professor Layton
- Thomas Triton, a character in The Deptford Mice

==== Mascots ====
- Triton, mascot of Eckerd College
- Triton, mascot of Edmonds College
- Triton, mascot of Pacifica High School (Oxnard, California)
- Triton, mascot of Mariner High School (Cape Coral, Florida)
- Triton, mascot of San Clemente High School (San Clemente, California)
- Triton, mascot of the University of California, San Diego
- Triton, mascot of the University of Guam
- Triton, mascot of the University of Missouri–St. Louis

== Companies ==
- Triton, a bass boat manufacturer
- Triton (fashion), a Brazilian fashion brand owned by Colcci
- Triton Airlines, a Canadian airline operating from 1993 to 1994
- Triton Digital
- Triton Energy Limited, an American oil and natural gas exploration and production company
- Triton Media Group, owner of radio stations
- Triton Showers, the UK's largest manufacturer of electric showers
- Triton Submarines, an American manufacturer of private submarines
- Triton Systems, a manufacturer of automated teller machines

== Film and television ==
- Triton (1961 TV series), a BBC television adventure series
- Triton (1968 TV series), a BBC television adventure series, remake of the earlier show

== Fountains ==
- Fontana del Tritone, Rome
- Fountain of the Tritons, Rome, completed in 1715
- Triton Fountain (Malta), Valletta, Malta, created in 1959

== Literature ==
- Triton (collection), a 1949 collection of fantasy short stories by L. Ron Hubbard
- Triton (Marvel Comics), a Marvel Comics character
- Triton of the Sea, a 1969 Japanese manga by Osamu Tezuka
- Triton (novel), a 1976 novel by Samuel R. Delany
- Tritón (magazine), a Mexican magazine dedicated to swimming, diving and water polo

== Military and government ==
- HMS Triton, various Royal Navy vessels
- Triton-class submarine or T-class, a class of British vessels
- USS Triton, various US Navy vessels
- HDMS Triton, various Danish Navy vessels
  - HDMS Triton (F358), a Danish Navy frigate
  - HDMS Triton (1790), an earlier Danish frigate
- RV Triton, a trimaran vessel used by the Australian Custom Service, and formerly by the Royal Navy for research
- USCGC Triton, a list of US Coast Guard vessels
  - USCGC Triton (WPC-116), a US Coast Guard patrol boat commissioned in 1934
- Northrop Grumman MQ-4C Triton, a US Navy unmanned aerial vehicle
- Triton, a World War II encryption network using the Enigma machine
- RHS Triton (Y 5), a Protefs-class submarine of the Royal Hellenic Navy
- Triton, a Type 209 submarine of the Hellenic Navy
- Triton-class diving support vessel, a class of Dutch diving support vessels
- Ocean Aero Triton, an autonomous underwater and surface vehicle

== People ==
- Tritón (wrestler) (born 1987), Mexican luchador enmascarado

== Places ==
- Triton Point, a point on the east coast of Alexander Island, Antarctica
- Triton, Newfoundland and Labrador, a village in Canada
- Triton Bay, an Arctic waterway in Qikiqtaaluk Region, Nunavut, Canada
- Triton River, a river flowing into Lake Copais, Greece
- Triton Bay, Kaimana, West Papua, Indonesia
- Triton Island, a Paracel Island in the South China Sea

== Schools ==
- Triton High School (disambiguation)
  - Triton Regional High School (New Jersey), a high school in Runnemede, New Jersey
- Triton College, Illinois, US
- Triton Regional School District, a school district in Massachusetts, US

== Sport ==
- UC San Diego Tritons, an athletic sports team for the University of California, San Diego
- Tampa Bay Tritons, a defunct professional roller hockey team
- Triton Financial Classic, a golf tournament on the Champions Tour from 2003 to 2009
- UMSL Tritons, University of Missouri–St. Louis athletic squad
- White Rock Tritons, a youth baseball team in South Surrey, British Columbia, Canada
- Seigneurie du Triton, a hunting and fishing club in Quebec, Canada
- Triton Poker Series, a series of poker tournaments

== Technology ==
- Triton (content delivery), a digital delivery and digital rights management service until 2006
- Triton (programming language), a language for writing compute kernels for graphics processing units
- Triton disk drive, a product that allows 2.8-inch floppy disks to be read on various home computers
- E Ink Triton, an electronic paper technology
- Korg Triton, a music workstation synthesizer
- Triton chipset, an Intel Pentium chipset
- Triton X-100, a nonionic surfactant
- TRITON, a SODAR system for measuring sound wave scattering
- AIM Triton, a version of the AOL Instant Messenger software
- Triton, a line of GPS receivers manufactured by Magellan Navigation
- Triton (malware), used to attack the Triconex control system at a power plant

== Vehicles ==
=== Air ===
- Sikorsky S-61T Triton, a helicopter
- Sud-Ouest Triton, a jet aircraft
- Micronautix Triton, a 4-6 place flight experience aircraft
- Triton, the Super Constellation airliner involved in the KLM Flight 633 crash

=== Land ===
- Mitsubishi Triton, a pickup truck
- Triton motorcycle, a hybrid Triumph–Norton motorcycle of the 1960s-1970s
- Ford Triton engine

=== Sea ===
- Triton (steamboat), a vessel that operated on Lake Washington in the first part of the 20th century
- MV Coral, formerly Triton, a cruise ship from 1991 to 2004
- Pearson Triton, a sailboat
- Triton 22, an American sailboat design
- Triton 24 sailing yacht, a sloop manufactured in Sydney, Australia, throughout the 1980s
- Triton 25, an American sailboat design
- Ocean Aero Triton, an autonomous underwater and surface vehicle

== Other uses ==
- Triton (physics), the nucleus of tritium, an isotope of hydrogen
- Triton (chamber music society), a chamber music society founded in Paris 1932 by Pierre-Octave Ferroud
- Triton (demogroup), a demo group active in the PC demoscene from 1992 to about 1996
- Triton (Dungeons & Dragons), a fictional species in the Dungeons & Dragons fantasy role-playing game
- Triton (fairy chess piece), a combined Rook and Locust
- Ford Triton engine, a series of car engines produced by Ford
- Energy-Quest Triton Expedition, a deep sea voyage
- Operation Triton, a border security operation in the Mediterranean Sea
- Triton X-100, a wetting agent
- Triton Knoll, a proposed offshore wind farm off the coast of Lincolnshire, England, UK
- Triton Light, a navigational beacon on the seawall of the US Naval Academy, US
- Triton Museum of Art, a museum in Santa Clara, California, US
- Triton City, a concept for a floating city proposed by Buckminster Fuller

== See also ==
- Benzyltrimethylammonium hydroxide or Triton B
- Tritone (disambiguation)
- Tritones (disambiguation)
- Tritonia (disambiguation)
- Tri-toon, a type of boat
- Tritton
- Tryton, a general purpose computer application platform
