= Triton (ship) =

Many vessels have been named Triton or Tryton, after Triton, the son of Poseidon and Amphitrite, and the personification of the roaring waters:

- HDMS Triton (F358), a Danish Navy frigate
- HMS Triton, several Royal Navy vessels
- British T-class submarine, also known as the Triton class, diesel-electric submarines
- USCGC Triton, several U.S. Coast Guard vessels
- USS Triton, several U.S. Navy vessels
- RV Triton, a trimaran vessel used by the Australians Custom Service, and formerly by the Royal Navy
- MV Coral, a cruise ship named Triton from 1991 to 2004
- Triton (steamboat), a vessel that operated on Lake Washington in the first part of the 20th century
- Triton 24, a sloop manufactured in Sydney, Australia, throughout the 1980s
- Pearson Triton, an American 1958 sailboat design
- Triton (East Indiaman); four vessels bearing the name Triton have sailed for the British East India Company.
- Triton (1815 ship) was launched at Calcutta and sold shortly thereafter to Spanish owners. She was sailing from Bengal to Cadiz when an American-built and outfitted privateer with a letter of marque from the patriotic forces in Buenos Aires captured her in January 1817.
