= Acoustic signature =

Characteristic combination of sound emissons

The term acoustic signature is used to describe a combination of acoustic emissions of sound emitters, such as those of ships and submarines. In addition, aircraft, machinery, and living animals can be described as having their own characteristic acoustic signatures or sound attributes, which can be used to study their condition, behavior, and physical location.

== Military use ==
The analysis of acoustic signatures is an important adjunct to passive sonar used to track naval warships and weapons. Similar methods have been used to identify aircraft, especially before the development of sophisticated radar tracking.

=== Sound characteristics ===
The acoustic signature is made up of a number of individual elements. These include:

- Machinery noise: noise generated by a ship's engines, propeller shafts, fuel pumps, air conditioning systems, etc.
- Cavitation noise: noise generated by the creation of gas bubbles by the turning of a ship's propellers.
- Hydrodynamic noise: noise generated by the movement of water displaced by the hull of a moving vessel.

These emissions depend on a hull's dimensions, the installed machinery and ship's displacement. Therefore, different ship classes will have different combinations of acoustic signals that together form a unique signature.

=== Targeting ===
Hydrophones and sonar operating in passive mode can detect acoustic signals radiated by otherwise invisible submarines, and use these signals to target attacks.

Modern naval mines and torpedoes such as the CAPTOR mine can be programmed to distinguish the acoustic signatures of different vessels, leaving friendly vessels unmolested and attacking high-value targets when faced with multiple possible targets, e.g. distinguishing an aircraft carrier from its escorts.

=== Countermeasures and acoustic quieting ===
Warship designers aim to reduce the acoustic signature of ships and submarines just as much as they aim to reduce the radar cross sections and infra-red signals. For submarines, as a prime factor in how they can be detected the reduction of the acoustic signature is a primary goal.

The acoustic signature can be reduced by

- fitting of machinery with the best possible mechanical tolerances and designed to produce a minimum of noise.
- decoupling the machinery from the hull by mounting machinery on rubber mounting blocks.
- designing propellers to reduce cavitation, this led to the development of large slow turning propellers, today there is a preference now for pump-jet propulsors over propellers.
- the fitting of anechoic tiles to the hull, however ill fitting and loose anechoic tiles can themselves be a source of noise.
- hydrodynamic efficiency to minimise the perturbation of water.
- care in minimising protrusions from the hull.

=== Trimaran warships ===
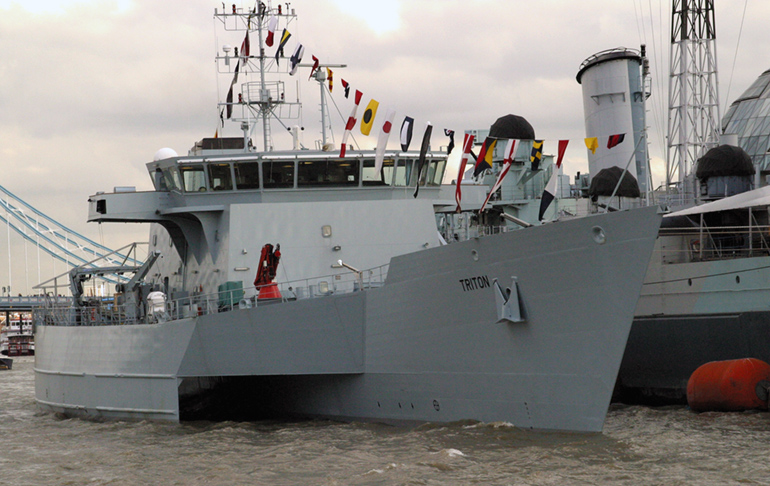
The RV Triton

For a time Britain's Royal Navy toyed with the idea of the trimaran hulled Future Surface Combatant. These would have had a very low acoustic signature. With three blade-like hulls, these ships would have cut through the water with a minimum of hydrodynamic noise. Radiated mechanical noise would also be minimised by using propulsors powered by a diesel-electric power plant, with the diesels being placed in the superstructure to mechanically isolate them from the water. This project got as far as the construction of the research ship RV Triton to test the principle of a large-scale trimaran design.

== See also ==
- Sonar
- Underwater acoustics
- Stealth ship
- Type 45 destroyer
- Anti-submarine warfare
- Submarine warfare
- Type 212 submarine
- Teardrop hull
- Spectrogram
