= Ocean Aero Triton =

- Triton AUSV during tests with the United States Pacific Fleet at San Diego, 2024

Class overview
- Name: Triton
- Builders: Ocean Aero
- Cost: $2.5 million - $3 million
- Built: c. 2022 – present

General characteristics
- Type: Autonomous underwater and surface vehicle
- Displacement: 350 kg (770 lb)
- Length: 4.5 m (14 ft 9 in)
- Beam: 0.8 m (2 ft 7 in)
- Draft: 1.5 m (4 ft 11 in)
- Installed power: Solar and wind power
- Propulsion: Electric thrusters and wind propulsion
- Speed: Surfaced: 5 kn (9.3 km/h; 5.8 mph); Submerged: 2 kn (3.7 km/h; 2.3 mph)
- Endurance: Surfaced: 30+ days; Submerged: 10+ days
- Test depth: 100 m (328 ft 1 in)
- Sensors & processing systems: Solstice 3000 sonar; SPRINT-Nav Mini acoustic-inertial navigation system

The Triton is an autonomous underwater and surface vehicle (AUSV) developed and manufactured by the US-based Ocean Aero company. As of 2026, it is the only type of naval drone capable of operating autonomously both on the surface and underwater. It relies on solar and wind power for propulsion and is designed for long-duration missions.

== Background ==
The Triton is the flagship product of Ocean Aero, a company backed by Teledyne, Lockheed Martin, and, since 2026, by James Fisher & Sons. It is described as the "world's first autonomous underwater and surface vehicle" (AUSV). It can function as either a sail-powered unmanned surface vessel or as a submerged craft for surveillance and reconnaissance.

=== Development and production ===
Development of the Triton started due to a need to create an uncrewed vessel capable of operating autonomously to patrol vast ocean areas. At the same time, the vehicle also had to avoid aerial surveillance and human-operated vessels. Thus, the development of the dual-mode surface and underwater vehicle began around 2013.

Production of the Triton began circa 2022, and Ocean Aero further established a new facility in Gulfport, Mississippi in 2023. As of 2025, the factory could manufacture 12 Tritons per year, with a maximum production output of 360 units per year at the American facility. Additionally, Ocean Aero also established a facility in Constanța, Romania, with a planned output of 100 Tritons per year, and an expected readiness in June 2027. Each naval drone costs between $2.5 million and $3 million, and 54 Tritons have been sold by 2026.

== Characteristics ==
Triton AUSV next to the USCGC Emlen Tunnell in the Persian Gulf, 2022

The Triton has a length of 4.5 m (15 ft), width of 0.8 m (2.6 ft), draft of 1.5 m (4.9 ft), and weighs around 350 kg (770 lb). Its sail mast extends to 3 m (9.8 ft) above the waterline. On the surface, the drone uses a hybrid propulsion method with its sail element for wind-assisted propulsion as well as an electric motor powered by the solar panels mounted on the deck and sail, which can generate up to 740 watts. For nighttime and underwater operation, the Triton features a solar-powered battery pack with a 13.2 kWh capacity.

The maximum speed on the surface is 5 kn (9.3 km/h; 5.8 mph), and while using its underwater thrusters, it can reach up to 2 kn (3.7 km/h; 2.3 mph). The AUSV can operate on the surface for more than 30 days and can stay submerged for over 10 days. It can also dive to a maximum depth of 100 m (328 ft 1 in).

The drone operates autonomously using waypoint navigation with AI-based obstacle and threat avoidance. The onboard systems include the Solstice 3000 multi-aperture sonar and the SPRINT-Nav Mini hybrid acoustic-inertial navigation system, provided by Forcys and its technology partners Sonardyne and Wavefront Systems. Additionally, to upload data, the Triton uses Iridium and Starlink satellite communications as well as cellular and mesh radios. The standard sensor suite further includes GPS/GNSS systems, meteorological sensors, an inertial navigation system, and at least five EO/IR cameras for 360° situational awareness.

Beyond the standard payload, the Triton can carry another 23 kg (50 lb) of extra sensors depending on the mission; thus it can be used for defense, scientific research, or industrial applications. For military missions, the drone could be used in intelligence, surveillance and reconnaissance, or force protection roles.

== Operational history ==
Turnover ceremony at the Philippine's Naval Operating Base Subic

The US Navy began experiments with Triton AUSVs around 2022/2023, operating in the Persian Gulf with Task Force 59 of the United States Naval Forces Central Command. These exercises were carried out with several Tritons as part of as part of maritime situational awareness experiments. The US Navy further studied the integration of Tritons in the Mediterranean Sea and the Gulf of Guinea.

Starting in May 2025, Triton AUSVs have been deployed for continuous subsea surveillance at the port of Gulfport, location of the Naval Construction Battalion Center. Further experiments were done for minesweeping capabilities of the Triton. In late 2025, the Triton was also used for the first autonomous unmanned system hydrographic survey, carried out in cooperation with the Maritime Hydrographic Directorate of the Romanian Naval Forces.

The United States government provided the Philippines Navy with four units of the Triton amidst the South China Sea dispute. The Triton was delivered on 23 June 2026.

Following an incident on 5 June 2026 involving jammed Ukrainian naval drones in Romanian territorial waters and in the port of Constanța, the Romanian Coast Guard acquired two Ocean Aero Triton AUSVs and started tests for detecting drones and potential threats to ports, pipelines and submarine cables. By August, the two systems became operational and began conducting surveillance missions outside the port of Constanța.

== Triton Next Gen ==
In 2026, Ocean Aero unveiled the Triton Next Gen, a redesign of the previous Triton AUSV. The Next Gen Triton features a new hull design, with a length of 4.5 m (15 ft), width of 1 m (3.3 ft), and draft of 0.75 m (2.5 ft). The new Triton also uses a larger battery pack of 35 kWh, and its solar panels can generate up to 1250 watts. The weight and payload capacity were further increased as well, with a total weight of 680 kg (1,500 lb) and a payload capacity of 160 kg (350 lb). Additionally, the AUSV can tow up to 500 kg (1,100 lb). According to Ocean Aero, two such vessels were already delivered in December 2025, and the company expects around 50 more to be ordered by the US Navy.

On 14 April 2026, the Australian company OCIUS Technology filed a complaint at the District of Delaware for patent infringement against Ocean Aero. OCICUS alleges that the American company copied several patents from its Bluebottle USV for the Triton Next Gen, including the specific center-mast sail design.

== Operators ==
- Philippines
  - Philippine Navy - 4 Tritons
- Romania
  - Romanian Coast Guard - 2 Tritons
- United States
  - United States Navy
