= Triton class =

Triton class may refer to:

- The Royal Navy's T class (or Triton class) of diesel-electric submarines designed in the 1930s to replace the O, P and R classes.
- A proposed but ultimately un-built class of United States Navy nuclear-powered radar picket submarines, numbering between four and eight units, with USS Triton (SSRN-586) serving as the intended lead ship and ultimately was the only ship of her type to be authorized for construction.
- Triton-class container ship, a class of large container ships.
- Triton-class cruise ship, and upcoming class of ships for Disney Cruise Line
