= Tritone (disambiguation) =

Tritone may refer to:

- Tritone (music), or augmented fourth, a dissonant interval of two pitches
- Tritone (telephony), or special information tones (SIT), a sequence of three tones played to indicate that a call did not go through
- Tritone (printing), an image printing method
- An image reproduced using three colors
  - RGB color model
  - Color television
  - Digital camera
  - Color printing
- Newt, a group of amphibians

== See also ==
- Tritones (disambiguation)
- Triton (disambiguation)
- Tritonia (disambiguation)
