= Tritones =

Tritones may refer to:

- Tritones (mythology)
  - Triton (mythology)
  - Daimones of the sea, see daemon (classical mythology)

== See also ==
- Tritone (disambiguation)
- Tritons, several
- Triton (disambiguation)
- Tritonia (disambiguation)
