= HDMS Triton =

At least five ships of the Royal Danish Navy have borne the name HDMS Triton:

- HDMS Triton (1790) a 30 gun frigate designed by E.W.Stibolt
- HDMS Triton (1913)
- HDMS Triton (1915) an Æger-class submarine launched in 1915 and sold for scrapping in 1946.
- HDMS Triton (F347) a Triton-class corvette launched in 1954 and decommissioned in 1981.
- HDMS Triton (F358) a Thetis-class frigate launched in 1990.
