= Trito =

Trito may refer to:

- Trito (Proto-Indo-European mythology), a warrior in Proto-Indo-European mythology
- Tritogeneia or Trito, an epithet of Athena in Greek mythology
- Lake Tritonis or Trito, a lake in Greek mythology

== See also ==
- Triton (disambiguation)
