= Triton-class container ship =

Series of container ships

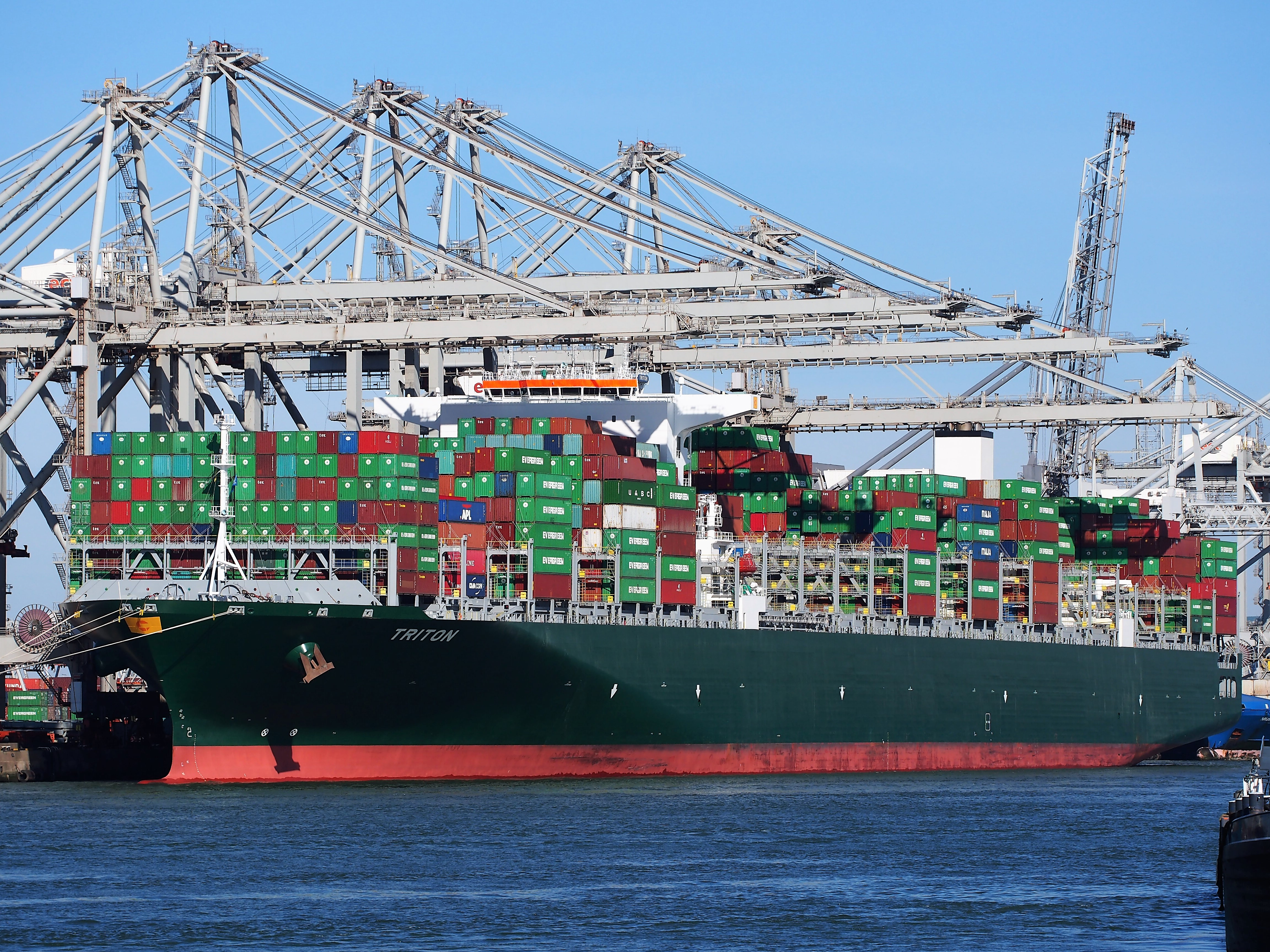
- Triton in the Port of Rotterdam

Class overview
- Builders: Samsung Heavy Industries
- Operators: Evergreen Marine
- In service: 2016–present
- Planned: 5
- Building: 0
- Completed: 5
- Active: 5

General characteristics
- Type: Container ship
- Tonnage: 149,210 GT
- Length: 369 m (1,211 ft)
- Beam: 51 m (167 ft)
- Draught: 15.8 m (52 ft)
- Propulsion: MAN Diesel & Turbo B&W 11S90ME-C9&10
- Capacity: 14,424 TEU

The Triton class is a series of five container ships built for Costamare and operated by Evergreen Marine. The ships have a maximum theoretical capacity of 14,424 TEU. The ships were built by Samsung Heavy Industries in South Korea.

== List of ships ==
Ship name	Yard number	IMO number	Delivered	Status	Ref.
Triton	2121	9728916	3 May 2016	In service	
Titan	2122	9728928	13 June 2016	In service	
Talos	2123	9728930	5 September 2016	In service	
Taurus	2124	9728942	4 October 2016	In service	
Theseus	2125	9728954	24 October 2016	In service	

== See also ==
- Evergreen G-class container ship
- Thalassa Hellas-class container ship
