= Romanian Border Police =

Romanian Border Police Poliția de Frontieră Română
- Coat of arms of the Romanian Border Police

- Racing stripe
- Abbreviation: PF; PFR
- Motto: PATRIA ET HONOR; Motherland and Honour

Agency overview
- Formed: 1999-06-04
- Preceding agency: Romanian Border Guard

Jurisdictional structure
- National agency: ROU
- Operations jurisdiction: ROU
- General nature: Civilian police
- Specialist jurisdiction: National border patrol, security, integrity

Operational structure
- Headquarters: Bucharest
- Sworn members: Yes
- Agency executive: Chestor șef de poliție Liviu Bute, Inspector-general
- Parent agency: Ministry of Internal Affairs

Website
- (in Romanian) Poliția de Frontieră

The Romanian Border Police (Romanian: Poliția de Frontieră) is the structure of the Romanian Ministry of Internal Affairs responsible for the border security and passport control at border crossing points, airports and ports.

== Structure ==
Since 2001 multiple restructures and improvements occurred in order to align the service to the European counterparts. Currently it is composed of the Border Police General Inspectorate which is the central structure, subordinated to the Ministry of Internal Affairs, while the second tier is composed of the 5 Territorial Inspectorates (Giurgiu, Timișoara, Oradea, Sighetu Marmației, Iași) and the Coast Guard. The latter was formed in 2011 when the County Inspectorates of Constanța and Tulcea were reorganized into the newly formed Coast Guard.

== Ranks ==
The Border Police uses the same ranking system as the Romanian Police, with different colors. (see Romanian Police)

Before 2002, the Border Police had military status and a military ranking system, within the Ministry of Internal Affairs (see Romanian Armed Forces ranks and insignia). In June 2002 it became a civilian police force, together with the National Police (the first police service in Eastern Europe to do so) and its personnel was structured into two corps:

- Corpul ofițerilor de poliție (Police Officers Corps) - corresponding to the commissioned ranks of a military force, to the ranks of Inspector, Superintendent and Commissioner in a British-style police force or to the both Corps de conception et de direction and Corps de commande et d'encadrement in the French National Police (Police Nationale).

Rank	Shoulder insignia	Translated as	Military rank equivalent	French police rank equivalent	British Metropolitan Police rank equivalent
Chestor-șef de poliție		Police Chief-Quaestor	General	Directeur des services actifs	Commissioner
Chestor-șef adjunct de poliție		Police Deputy-Quaestor	Lieutenant General	Inspecteur général	Assistant Commissioner
Chestor principal de poliție		Police Principal Quaestor	Major General	Contrôleur général	Deputy Assistant Commissioner
Chestor de poliție		Police Quaestor	Brigadier General	Contrôleur général	Commander
Comisar-șef de poliție		Police Chief-Commissioner	Colonel	Commissaire divisionnaire	Chief Superintendent
Comisar de poliție		Police Commissioner	Lieutenant Colonel	Commissaire de police	Superintendent Grade I
Subcomisar de poliție		Police Sub-Commissioner	Major	Commandant	Superintendent
Inspector principal de poliție		Police Principal Inspector	Captain	Capitaine	Chief Inspector
Inspector de poliție		Police Inspector	Lieutenant	Lieutenant	Inspector
Subinspector de poliție		Police Sub-Inspector	Second Lieutenant	Lieutenant intern	Temporary/Probationary Inspector

- Corpul agenților de poliție (Police Agents Corps) - corresponding to the non-commissioned ranks of a military force, to the Corps de maîtrise et d'application in the French National Police or to the ranks of Constable or Sergeant in a British-style police force.

Rank	Shoulder insignia	Translated as	Military rank equivalent	French police rank equivalent	British Metropolitan Police rank equivalent
Agent-șef principal de poliție		Police Principal Chief Agent	Sergeant Major	Brigadier-major	Station Sergeant
Agent-șef de poliție		Police Chief Agent	Master Sergeant	Brigadier-chef	Station Sergeant
Agent-șef adjunct de poliție		Police Deputy Chief Agent	Sergeant First Class	Brigadier	Sergeant
Agent principal de poliție		Police Principal Agent	Staff Sergeant	Gardien de la paix	Acting Sergeant
Agent de poliție		Police Agent	Sergeant	Gardien de la paix stagiare	Constable

== Equipment ==
=== Land ===
Passenger cars
Model	Type	Image	Notes
Dacia	Duster		
Dacia	Logan		
Ford	Ranger Raptor		A number of surveillance vehicles are equipped with thermal imaging.
Ford	Transit		Equipped with night surveillance post.
Iveco	Massif		
Mitsubishi	L200		50 special vehicles for transporting dogs.
Volkswagen	Passat Variant		
Minibuses
Volkswagen	Transporter Kombi		
ATVs
Dinli	Centhor 700		
Snowmobiles
Ski-Doo	Expedition		

=== Aircraft ===
Following the concluded protocols, the Romanian Border Police is supported by the General Aviation Inspectorate and the National Police.

=== Naval ===
==== Current fleet ====
- 1 OPV 950 class: 950 tons built by Damen Group, at the Galați shipyard.
  - MAI 0201 Ștefan cel Mare (ex MAI 1105)
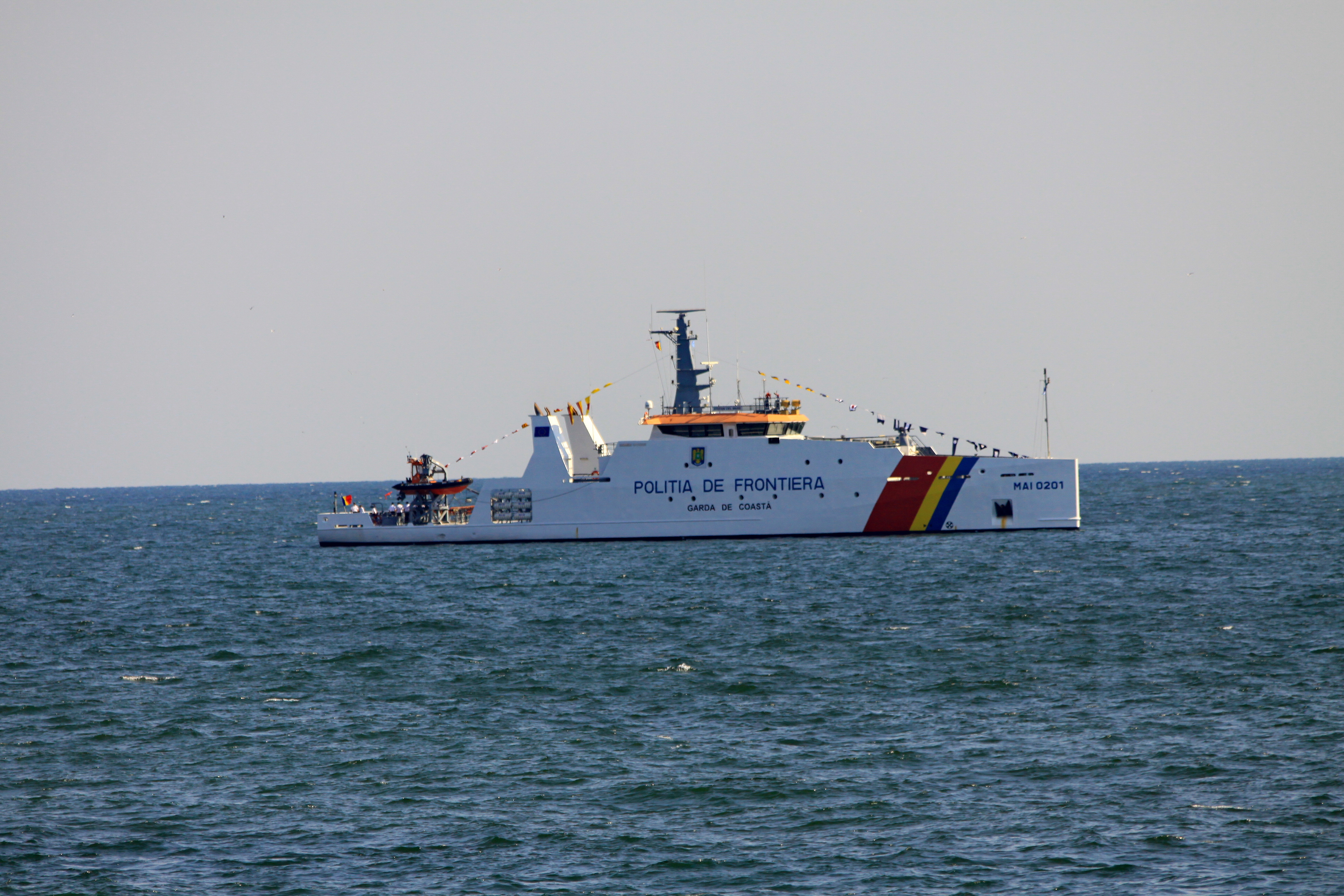
    MAI 0201 Ștefan cel Mare at the Romanian Navy Day 2018
- 2 FCS 4008 class: 300 tons built by Damen Group, at the Damen Shipyards Antalya
  - MAI 1106, 1107
- 4 Neustadt class patrol boat: 218 tons ex-German Federal Border Guard, built by Lürssen shipyard in Bremen-Vegesack, Germany.
  - MAI 1101, 1102, 1103, 1104 (ex BG-12 Bad Bramstedt, BG-15 Eschwege, BG-16 Alsfeld, BG-17 Bayreuth)
- 2 Bigliani class patrol boat: 90 tons ex-Guardia di Finanza, built by Intermarine, Italy.
  - MAI 2113, 2114 (ex G.80 Bigliani, G.81 Cavaglià)
- 3 Shaldag Mk IV class patrol boat: 72 tons built by Israel Shipyards in Haifa, Israel.
  - MAI 2110, 2111, 2112

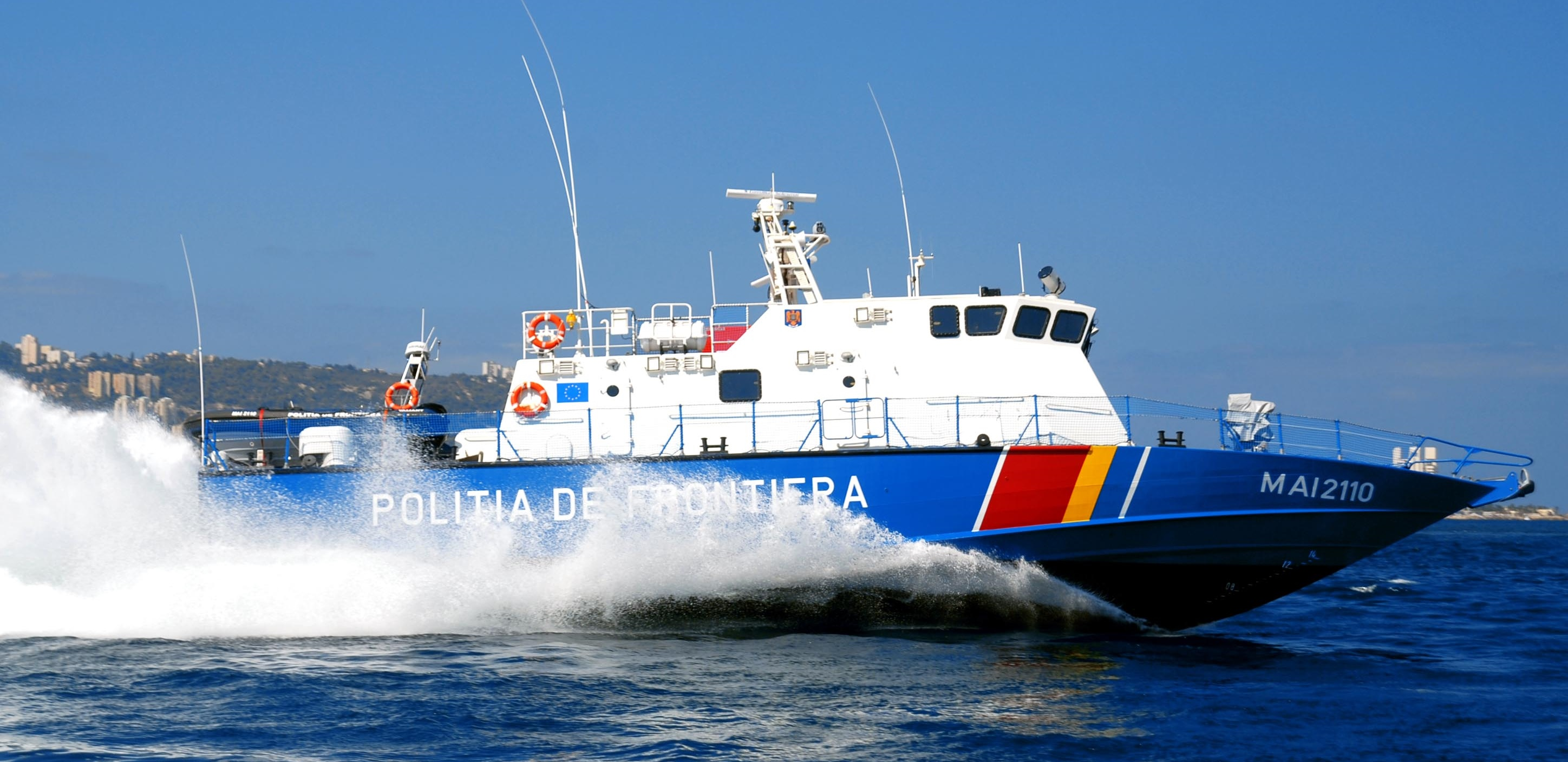
Shaldag Mk IV patrol vessel

- 5 Patrol 1850 boat: 30 tons built by Kewatec Finland.
  - MAI 3063, 3064, 3065, 3066, 3067
- 5 SNR-17 class patrol boat: 25 tons built by Istanbul Shipyard, Turkey.
  - MAI 3057, 3058, 3059, 3060, 3061
- various small coastal and riverine vessels, hovercraft, pontoons, etc.

==== Historic ships ====
- VG-10 class patrol boat: built by the Brăila shipyard (now part of VARD) between 1953 and 1954.

=== Drones ===
==== UAVs ====
- Schiebel Camcopter S-100 - made available by the European Maritime Safety Agency (EMSA)
- ALTI Transition Advanced Raptor - 5 thermal engine drones, allowing continuous flight of up to 8 hours, with a range of 150 km.

==== USVs ====
- Ocean Aero Triton - Autonomous Underwater and Surface Vehicle used by the Coast Guard

== See also ==
- Romanian Police
- Romanian Gendarmerie
- Ministry of Internal Affairs
