= Coat of arms of the Romanian Border Police =

- Shield: green shield, a silver landmark which has, in its upper part, two crossed golden swords, and, in its lower part, a black anchor. The landmark is leant by, on both sides, by two golden lions with red tongues
- Motto: Latin: PATRIA ET HONOR

The Coat of Arms of the Romanian Border Police consists of the following elements: a large blue shield with a crusader golden eagle, with its head turned to the right, a red peak and claws, open wings, and holding a silver sword in its right claw; the green olive branch, symbolizing peace and order, replacing the mace from the coat of arms of the country. The small green shield, placed on the eagle's chest, has a silver landmark which has in its upper part two crossed golden swords, and in its lower part a black anchor. Two golden lions with red tongues lean on both sides of the landmark. At the bottom of the external shield, on a white scarf, the motto of the ministry is written in black: Latin: PATRIA ET HONOR.

The landmark with the anchor and the crossed swords evokes the idea of guarding and control, as well as the appearance of inviolable Romanian borders. The crossed swords symbolize the capacity of judging and of separating the guilty from the innocent. The lions symbolize vigilance, nobleness, heroism, power, authority, force, wisdom, and energy in the service of good.
