= OCIUS Technology =

Australian maritime robotics company

Ocius Technology
- Formerly: Solar Sailor
- Founded: 1999
- Key people: Robert Dane (CEO)
- Products: Bluebottle uncrewed surface vessel
- Website: ocius.com.au

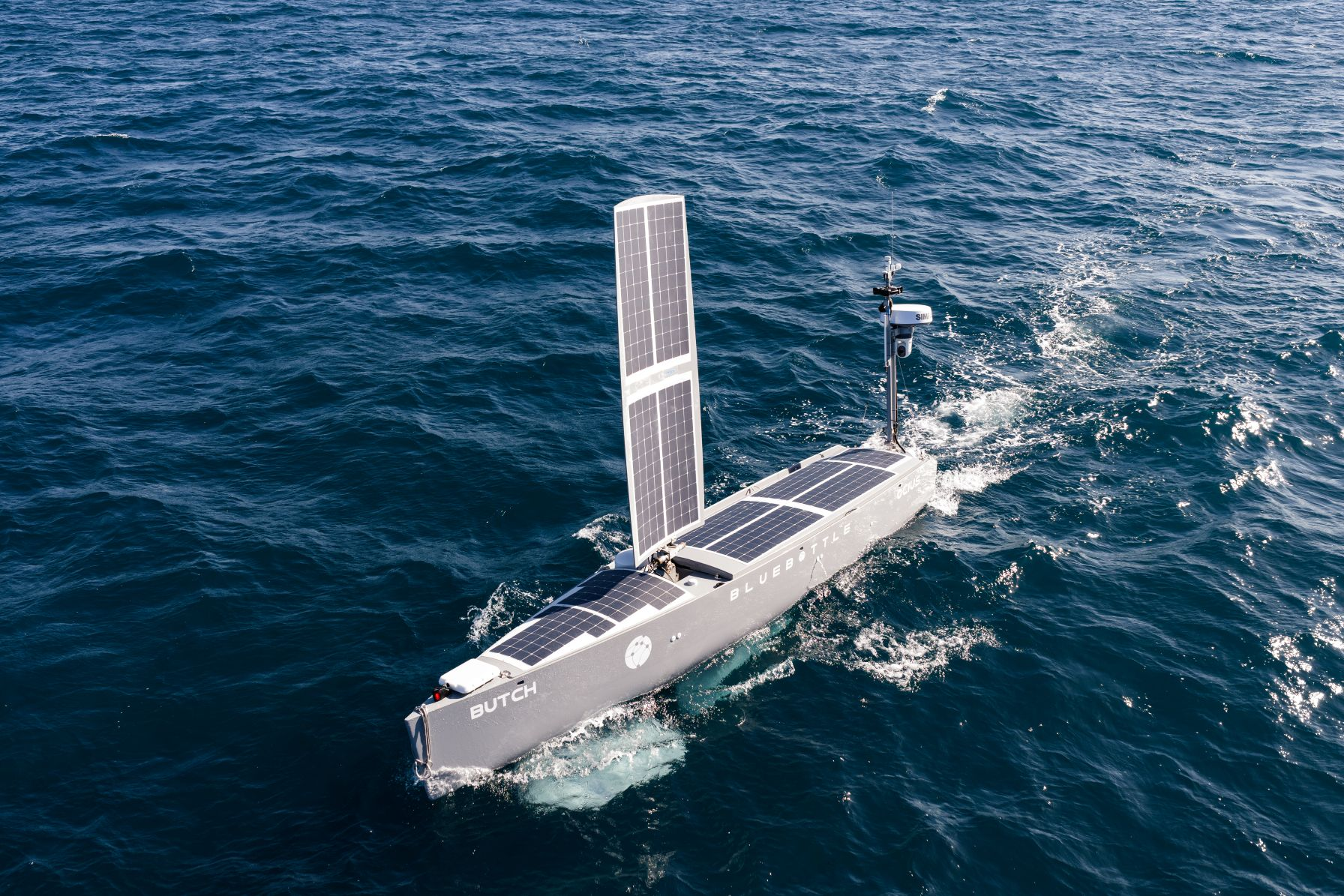
Bluebottle - Uncrewed Surface Vessel

OCIUS, formerly known as Solar Sailor, is an Australian maritime robotics company that develops and operates uncrewed surface vessels for maritime surveillance and monitoring. The company is based in Sydney, Australia.

Ocius is known for its Bluebottle uncrewed surface vessel, a platform designed for long‑duration maritime operations. Bluebottle vessels are in use by the Royal Australian Navy and Royal New Zealand Navy as well by ThayerMahan in the United States.

== History ==
=== 1999–2014: As Solar Sailor ===
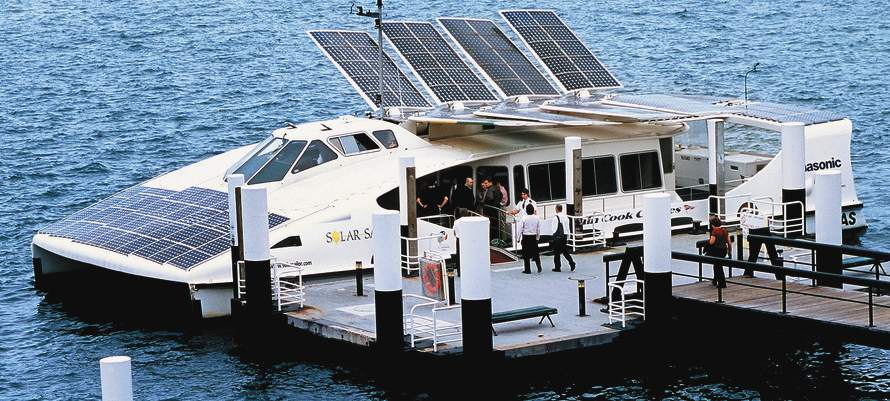
Solar Sailor Ferry docking in Sydney harbour

Ocius was formerly known as Solar Sailor, an Australian company established in 1999. The company was founded by a number of people including Robert Dane, who is the current CEO of Ocius Technology; it operated a ferry with Captain Cook Cruises. Former Australian Prime Minister Bob Hawke AC was chairman of Solar Sailor from 2001 to 2013.

=== 2014–present: Ocius Technology ===
In 2014, Solar Sailor changed its name to Ocius Technology, stating that Ocius is Latin for "fleet"; the Latin word "Ocius" translates to "fleet" in the sense of "more quickly, more speedily", rather than meaning "a group of ships".

The patent for the Bluebottle's sail design was first filed in 2016. According to Dane, the first Bluebottle was designed by Sydney naval architect company One2Three Naval Architects.

From 2022, Ocius supported the Australian Government’s Operation Resolute program through delivery and operation of the Bluebottle.

In 2024 the Australian Government named the Bluebottle as a platform it would acquire, under the Defence Integrated Investment Program.

In December 2024, Ocius officially launched the first of two uncrewed surface vessels, known as Bluebottles, for the New Zealand Defence Force. The first of the vessels adopted by the New Zealand Navy were christened Tahi and Rua, after the Maori words for 'one' and 'two'.

In March 2026, the Royal Australian Navy announced $176 million contract for Ocius to deliver 40 new Australian designed and built Bluebottle uncrewed surface vessels.

On April 14th, 2026, Ocius Technology filed a complaint against Ocean Aero, a U.S. based maritime robotics company, for alleged infringements of Bluebottle patents in Ocean Aero's Next Gen Triton AUSV.

== Products and Technology ==
Ocius develops maritime robotics systems; the company is primarily focused on the Bluebottle platform, an autonomous surface vessel designed to operate for extended periods using renewable energy sources.

The Bluebottle vessel is 7.4m fiberglass-hulled uncrewed vessel. The Bluebottle is entirely powered by renewable energy, using a combination of solar, wind and wave energy sources. The Bluebottle Hybrid variant carries a diesel generator to support operations in low-light conditions or to support payloads with high power requirements.

The Bluebottle can carry a variety of surface sensors, including radar, as well as electro-optic, infra-red and other sensors. The Bluebottle keel stores a winch that deploys a thin line towed array for underwater acoustic monitoring. The primary use case for Bluebottle is to support anti-submarine warfare operations. The vessel also performs surface surveillance and underwater communications tasks. The Bluebottle Hybrid has been used for hydrography.

Though the Bluebottle remains the primary product of Ocius Technology, the company was involved in the creation of the iDrogue prototype in collaboration with the University of New South Wales and the Australian Maritime College.

== Customers ==
The Bluebottle has been procured by the Royal Australian Navy as part of maritime surveillance initiatives including Operation Resolute and is named for major acquisition in the 2024 Australian Government Defence Integrated Investment Program.

Internationally, Ocius Bluebottle vessels operate in the United States where they are owned by US defence prime contractor ThayerMahan, fitted with ThayerMahan acoustic monitoring systems and sold under the brand Outpost. The Royal New Zealand Navy also operates the Bluebottle to support maritime domain awareness.

Bluebottle USVs have been used by other Australian government agencies for maritime monitoring and security tasks, scientific applications such as whale monitoring, training, and bathymetry.

== Ocius and AUKUS ==
The Bluebottles developed by Ocius have been flagged as potentially having a key role to play in the Aukus security partnership between Australia, the United States and the United Kingdom.
