= Triton (East Indiaman) =

At least four ships that have borne the name Triton, named for Triton (in Greek mythology the messenger of the sea), have made voyages for the British East India Company (EIC):

- Triton (1750 EIC ship) - 499, or 668 tons (bm), launched on 3 November 1750 by Wells & Stanton, Deptford; she made four voyages for the EIC between 1751 and 1761. She was sold for breaking up in 1762.
- Triton (1766 EIC ship) - 637 tons (bm), launched on 19 September 1766 by West, Deptford; she made four trip for the EIC between 1766 and 1777. In September 1777 the Admiralty purchased her for use as an armed escort ship and named her HMS Nabob. In 1780 the Royal Navy converted her to a hospital ship. She was sold on 10 April 1783 for breaking up.
- Triton (1787 EIC ship) - 800 tons (bm), launched in 1787; she made three voyages for the EIC before the French privateer Robert Surcouf captured her in Balasore Roads on 29 January 1796. The British Royal Navy recaptured her.
- Triton (1787 EIC ship) - a ship that the EIC chartered for three trips between 1800 and 1802; she retained her name after her recapture. She continued to trade until c.1809.
