= Triton Showers =

British manufacturer of showers

Triton Showers is a British manufacturer of showers based in Warwickshire.

== History ==
It was incorporated on 6 May 1975 as Triton (Aquatherm) Limited. It became Triton plc on 2 July 1982. Under the Companies Act 1985, it re-registered as a public limited company in June 1986. The name Triton refers to the Greek god Triton, who was depicted as being half-human and half-fish, and carried a trident.

Triton Showers received two awards, the "Best of British" and "Best Bathroom Supplier" trophies, at the Daily Express Home and Living Awards in 2017.

In May 2024 Triton won a King's Award for Enterprise.

In November 2024, UK rival Kohler Mira won a patent infringement case against Triton parent Norcros, alleging that Triton's DuElec range infringed on a Mira patent.

=== Ownership ===
Triton has been owned by Norcros Holdings since September 1987.

=== Product range ===
Triton produces a range of mixer and electric showers. The company also produces ancillaries including shower enclosures, handwash water heaters and taps.

== Structure ==
The company is situated on Shepperton Park in Nuneaton and as of 2017 employed about 350 people.

== Sports sponsorship ==
Triton has sponsored sports teams, with the England men's hockey team at the EuroHockey Indoor Nations Championship in February 1991 in Birmingham.

In June 1991, it sponsored a main event at the Royal International Horse Show, held in Birmingham, won by Paul Darragh.

In July 1992, it sponsored an event in the 1992 World Sportscar Championship. It sponsored the Lurgan Park Rally, a motorsport rally in Northern Ireland, from 2003 to 2005.

In 2010, the company sponsored the football ground of Nuneaton Town F.C., being known as the Triton Showers Community Arena.

The company's Irish distributor finances a national rallying contest in Ireland, known as the Triton Showers National Rally Championship.
