= Triton High School =

Triton High School may refer to:

- Triton Junior–Senior High School, Bourbon, Indiana
- Triton Regional High School (Massachusetts), Byfield, Massachusetts
- Triton Senior High School, Dodge Center, Minnesota
- Triton Regional High School (New Jersey), Runnemede, New Jersey
- Triton High School (North Carolina), Erwin, North Carolina
