= USCGC Triton =

USCGC Triton may refer to:

- Triton was a 165-foot cutter which operated from Coast Guard Base 15 at Biloxi, Mississippi during what was referred to at the time as "the Prohibition War"—with operations against alcohol smugglers during Prohibition in the United States.
- USCGC Triton (WPC-116), was a patrol boat commissioned in 1934 and served until 1967

== See also ==
- USS Triton
- HMS Triton
