= Bluebottle (uncrewed surface vessels) =

Autonomous vessel

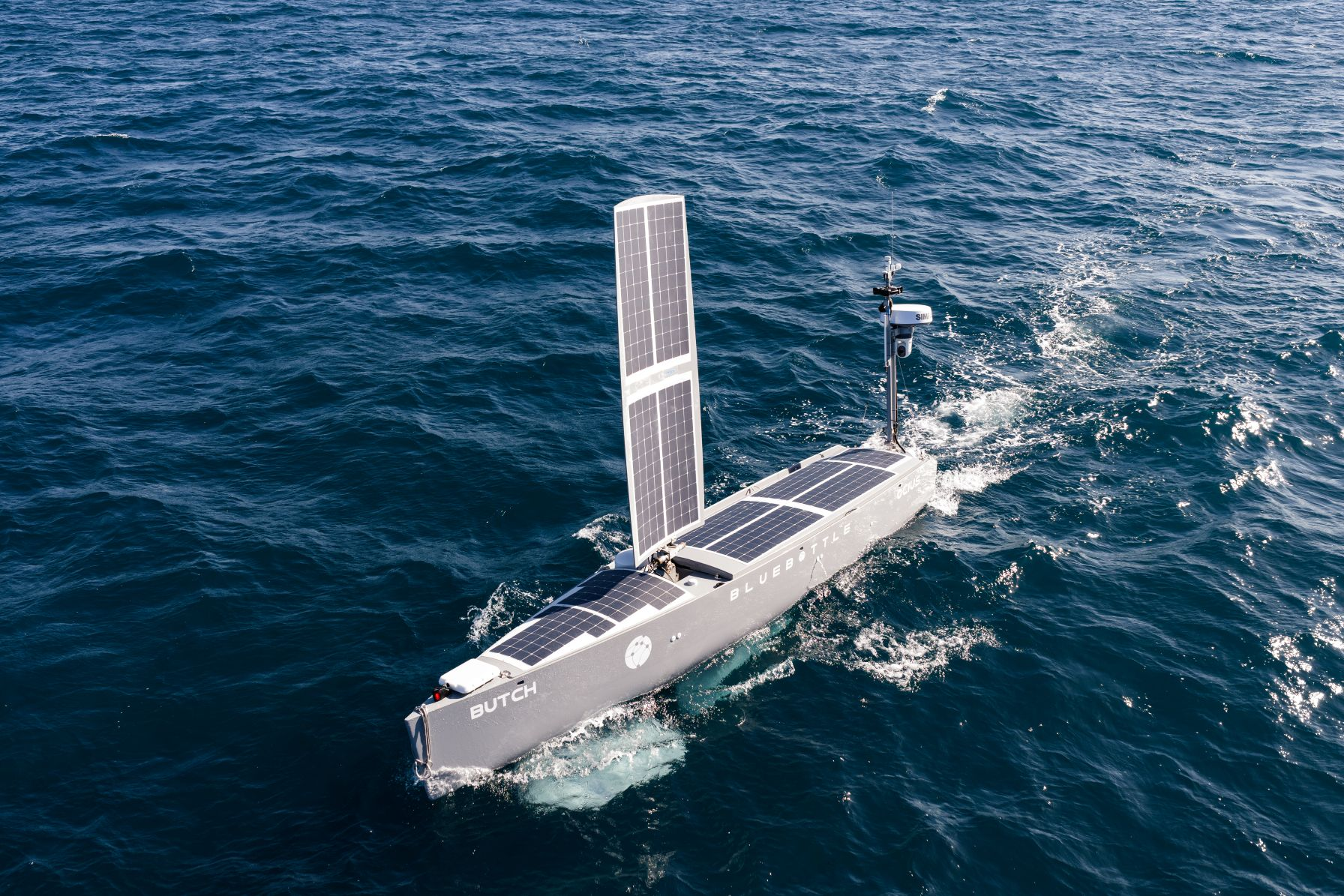
- Ocius Bluebottle

Class overview
- Builders: OCIUS Technology
- Operators: Royal Australian Navy; Australian Border Force; Royal New Zealand Navy
- Built: mid‑2010s–present
- In commission: 2022–present
- Planned: 57
- On order: 40
- Completed: 17

General characteristics
- Type: Autonomous underwater vehicle
- Length: 7.4 m (24 ft 3 in)
- Notes: Information on the design specifics has not been publicly released.

The Bluebottle is an Australian long-range, extra-large unmanned surface vehicle being jointly developed by OCIUS Technology and the Australian Department of Defence (DoD) for the Royal Australian Navy (RAN). 15 have been developed and used by the Royal Australian Navy from 2022–2026 with an additional 40 ordered in March 2026.

== Project history ==
In March 2026, a $176 million contract was signed for an additional 40 Bluebottles for the Royal Australian Navy, which would bring the total amount in service to 55.

The Royal New Zealand Navy had two Bluebottles as of August 2025.

It was announced in October 2026 that the Australian Government was gifting an unspecified number of Bluebottles to Fiji, with the USVs to be delivered in 2027.

== See also ==
- Future of the Royal Australian Navy
