= HMS Triton =

Eight vessels of the Royal Navy have been named HMS Triton or HMS Tryton, after Triton, the son of Poseidon and Amphitrite, and the personification of the roaring waters:

- HMS Tryton (1702) was a 42-gun fifth rate, originally the French ship Triton, captured by the British in 1702 at the Battle of Vigo Bay, and sold in 1709.
- HMS Tryton (1741) was a sloop in commission in 1741.
- HMS Tryton (1745) was a 24-gun sixth-rate frigate launched in 1745 and burned on 28 April 1758 to avoid capture by the French.
- HMS Triton (1773) was a 28-gun sixth-rate frigate launched in 1773. She served with Rear Admiral Sir Samuel Hood's fleet off Nevis on 25 January 1782. She was broken up in 1796.
- HMS Triton (1796) was a 32-gun fifth-rate frigate launched in 1796. She served in the French Revolutionary and Napoleonic Wars and was broken up in 1820.
- HMS Triton (1846) was an iron paddle sloop launched in 1846 and sold in 1872.
- HMS Triton (1882) was a paddle survey vessel launched in 1882. She was a school ship at Gravesend from 1919, and was broken up in 1961.
- HMS Triton (N15) was a T-class submarine launched in 1937 and sunk in 1940.

== See also ==
- HMS Tryton Prize was a 28-gun sixth rate, formerly the French privateer Royal. She was captured in 1705 by HMS Tryton and was sold in 1709.
- RV Triton was an experimental trimaran operated by the Royal Navy in the early 2000s before being sold to the Maritime and Coastguard Agency in 2005 as a survey vessel. She was not commissioned however and did not carry the HMS prefix.
