= USS Triton =

USS Triton may refer to:

- USS Triton (YT-10), a tug in commission from 1889 to 1930
- USS Triton (ID-3312), a tug that served briefly during 1918
- USS Triton (SS-201), a submarine commissioned in 1940 and sunk in 1943
- USS Triton (SSRN-586), later SSN-586, a submarine in commission from 1959 to 1969

== See also ==
- USCGC Triton
