= Triton 24 =

^{Specifications}

Number of crew	2-3
LOA	7.543m 24 ft
LWL	6.48m
Draft	1.447m
Beam	2.678m
Hull weight (with fittings)	1.954 tonnes
Main Sail Area	141 ft²
No 1 Genoa	218 ft²
No 2 Genoa	163 ft²
Spinnaker	460 ft²

The Triton 24 sailing yacht is an inshore masthead sloop designed by John C Alsop and manufactured in Sydney, Australia, by the Triton Boat Company throughout the 1980s.
