= HDMS Triton (1790) =

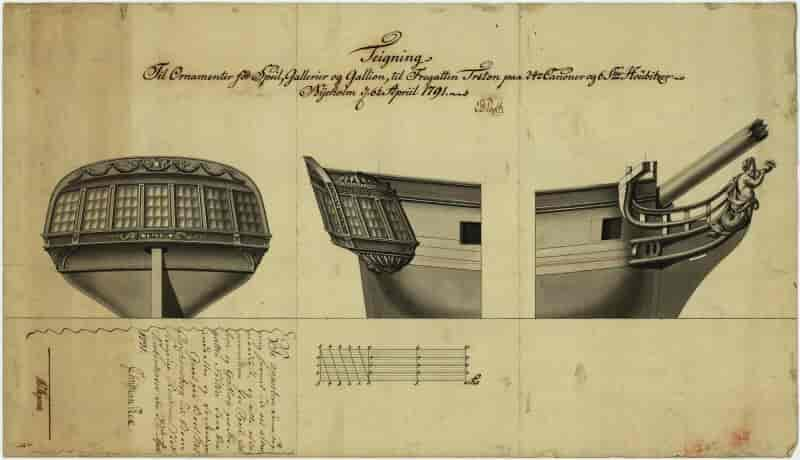

History

Denmark
- Name: Triton
- Builder: Stibolt of Nyholm, Copenhagen
- Launched: 7 August 1790
- Commissioned: 1793
- Notes: "Embargoed" by the British in 1801 in the Mediterranean; Captured at the Battle of Copenhagen (1807) and burnt soon thereafter.

General characteristics
- Displacement: 456½ Lst
- Length: 130 ft (40 m)
- Beam: 34 ft (10 m)
- Draught: 14 ft 10 in (4.52 m)aft; 13 ft 8 in forward
- Sail plan: Frigate
- Complement: 263 men
- Armament: 24 × 12-pounder cannon, 6 × 12-pounder howitzers

HDMS Triton was a frigate of the Royal Dano-Norwegian Navy launched in 1790 which operated in Dano-Norwegian home waters and in the Mediterranean in the protection of Denmark-Norway's merchant fleet. The period in which it operated was fraught with political and practical difficulties (see First League of Armed Neutrality and its successors) which led to two battles at Copenhagen (1801 and 1807) and other, less significant, actions.

== Ship design ==
Triton was a Stibolt-built frigate designed to have versatile weapon-aiming capabilities. Not only did it have a conventional broadside of twelve cannon, but the foremost gun could be manoeuvred to fire forwards. The six howitzers could also be moved to aim aft or to the sides. (Note: Design plans can be found by following the reference and clicking "vis")

== Ship's career ==
1793

Triton was commissioned and served in the home squadron, but also convoyed, as far as Cape Finisterre, merchant ships bound for China. Her captain at this time was George Albrecht Koefoed. (Note: In March 1800 G A Koefoed, now a commodore, was ordered to assume command over all the Danish naval units in the Mediterranean (relieving Steen Andersen Bille) and took passage with Triton from Copenhagen to that station where he transferred to Thetis as his command ship in July 1800, reporting in September 1800 from Tunis Bay of his successful peace negotiations and the release of Danish/Norwegian prisoners)

In 1794 Triton was with the home squadron and in 1795, commanded by senior Lieutenant Denis Christian Bagge, served with a joint Swedish/Danish squadron operating in protection of trade.

Mediterranean

Commanded by Captain Althon Günther von Ellbrecht, Triton arrived at Malaga (which was used as the main Danish base in the Mediterranean) on 20 June 1797 to join Steen Andersen Bille's squadron, too late for the action of 16 May 1797. Captain Ellbrecht was credited with being an energetic and efficient officer and once came into conflict with the British authorities in Gibraltar when Triton fired at two British privateers who had taken a Danish prize, Kjærligheden, which Triton recaptured.

In April 1799, a lightning strike on the main mast caused a fire that took four hours to bring under control. Triton returned to Copenhagen on 5 October 1799.

From 1800 to 1802 under Captain-Lieutenant Johan Hartvig Ernst von Berger Triton was active in the Mediterranean squadron, but from 15 February 1801 was detained in Mahón by the British. On 16 February the Danish brig Glommen was also detained. Both ships were held until 3 July 1801. Back on duty, the ship was caught by a severe storm whilst in Livorno harbour in November 1801 and lost four anchors but was saved by grounding on a mudbank.

In the spring of 1802 one of Triton's officers, senior Lieutenant Hans Emanuel Wulff, developed eye problems similar to a cataract and was landed at Pisa for treatment. Much improved, he returned on board on 14 May 1802. The ship returned to Copenhagen on 10 December 1802.

Home waters

In August 1803 Triton was at Christiansand where Captain-Lieutenant Andreas Nissen was inspecting a number of laid-up ships. and was again in Norway in 1804.

1807

Triton was fetched from Christiansand to Copenhagen (see Jørgen Conrad de Falsen ) and captained by Carl Adolf Roth in May 1807, not long before the Battle of Copenhagen where she was seized, along with the rest of the fleet, by the British but abandoned and burnt on Saltholm or nearby Swedish coast.

== Gallery ==
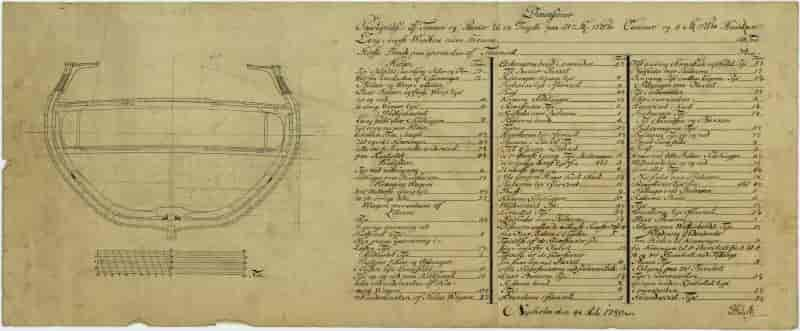

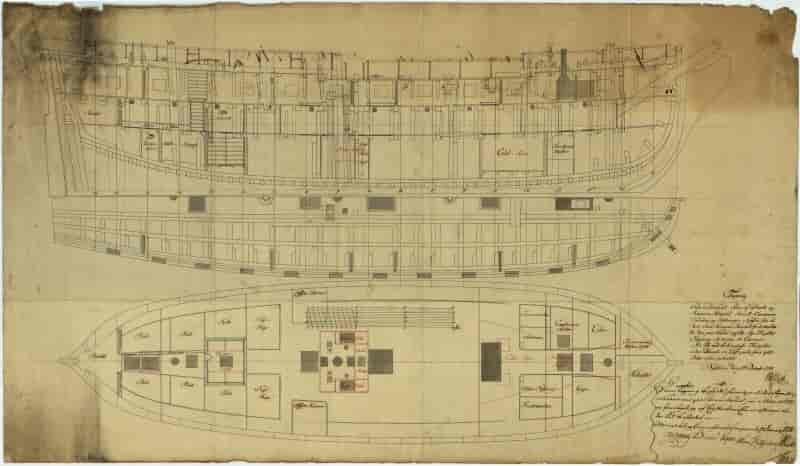

== Citations ==
- Royal Danish Naval Museum - List of Ships - Triton
- Royal Danish Naval Museum – Skibregister - Record card for Triton (1790)
- (in Danish)T. A. Topsøe-Jensen og Emil Marquard (1935) “Officerer i den dansk-norske Søetat 1660-1814 og den danske Søetat 1814-1932“. Two volumes. Download here.
