= Tritonia =

Tritonia may refer to:

- Tritonia (plant)
- Tritonia (gastropod)
- Tritonia Academic Library
- in musical scale analysis, possessing tritones
- in Greek mythology, an epithet for Athena
- The first practical atmospheric diving suit, developed in 1922 as the first in the JIM suit series
- a radio show hosted by the electronic music group Tritonal
