= HDMS Triton (F358) =

Thetis-class frigate

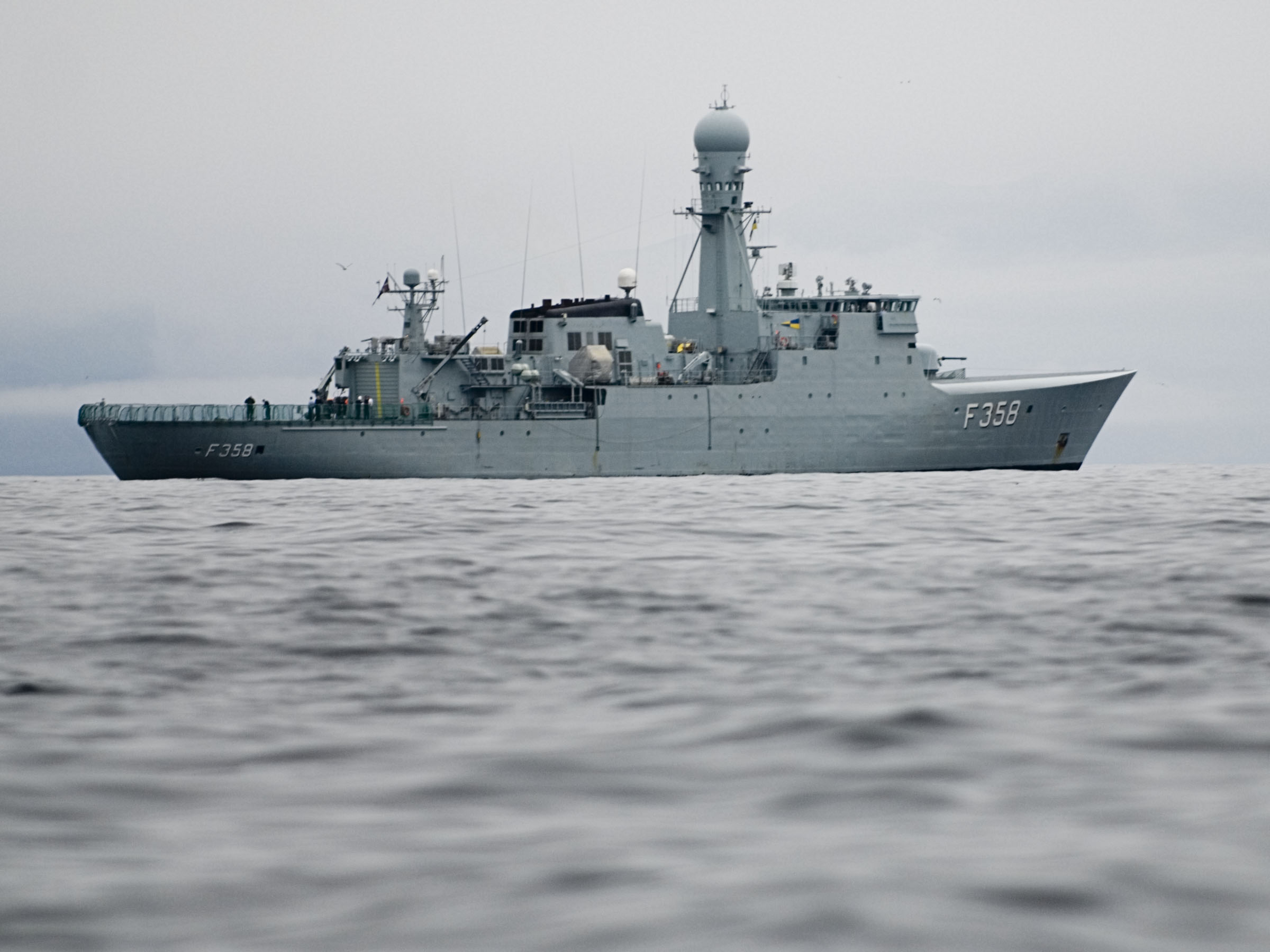
- HDMS Triton (F358)

History

Kingdom of Denmark
- Name: Triton
- Namesake: Triton
- Owner: Royal Danish Navy
- Builder: Svendborg Shipyard Ltd
- Laid down: 7 August 1989
- Launched: 16 March 1990
- Commissioned: 2 December 1991
- Identification: MMSI number: 219523000; Callsign: OUEV
- Status: In active service

General characteristics
- Class & type: Thetis-class frigate
- Type: Ocean patrol frigates
- Displacement: 3,500 tons, standard
- Length: 112.3 m (368 ft 5 in)
- Beam: 14.4 m (47 ft 3 in)
- Height: 37.0 m (121 ft 5 in)
- Draft: 6.0 m (19 ft 8 in)
- Installed power: 3 × Detroit Diesel GM 16V 7163-7305 at 460; 1 × Detroit Diesel 6L-71N 1063-7005 at 120 kW (EMG)
- Propulsion: 3 × MAN B&W Diesel 12v28/32A-D at 2940 kW (3990 hk), single shaft; 1 × Brunvoll azimuth thruster (800 kW); 1 × electrical Brunvoll bow thruster (600 kW)
- Speed: 21.8 kn (40.4 km/h)
- Range: 8,700 nmi (16,000 km) at 15 kn (28 km/h)
- Endurance: 60 days
- Boats & landing craft carried: 2 x 7 m (23 ft) RHIBs
- Complement: 47-60 depending on role + aircrew etc.
- Sensors & processing systems: 1 × Terma Scanter Mil 009 navigational radar; 1 × Furuno FR-1505 DA surface search radar; 1 × Plessey AWS-6 air search radar; 1 × SaabTech Vectronics 9LV 200 Mk 3 fire control system; 1 × SaabTech CTS-36 hull-mounted sonar; Thales TMS 2640 Salmon variable depth sonar; FLIR Systems AN/AAQ-22 SAFIRE thermal imager
- Electronic warfare & decoys: 1 × Thales Defense Ltd Cutlass radar warning receiver; 1 × Thales Defense Scorpion radar jammer; 2 × Sea Gnat launchers (for chaff and flares)
- Armament: 1 × 76 mm 62-cal. OTO Melara Super Rapid DP; 7 × 12.7 mm heavy machine guns; 4 × 7.62 mm light machine guns; 1 × depth charge rack and MU90 Advanced Lightweight Torpedo for anti-submarine warfare
- Aircraft carried: 1 x Westland Lynx Mk.90B helicopter. From approx. 2016: MH-60R
- Aviation facilities: Aft helicopter deck and hangar
- Notes: Int'l Call Sign: OUEV

HDMS Triton is a Thetis-class frigate belonging to the Royal Danish Navy. It is being used to exercise the Danish sovereignty over the waters around Greenland and the Faroe Islands.

== History ==
On 19 December 2006, the Triton participated in the rescue operation of the crew of the cargo ship Wilson Muuga after it ran aground south of Sandgerði on the Reykjanes peninsula. During the operation, eight sailors from the Triton went into the sea after their rigid inflatable boat overturned in rough seas. Seven of the men were rescued by Icelandic Coast Guard helicopter TF-LÍF while one died.
