= RV Triton =

Research vessel launched in 2000

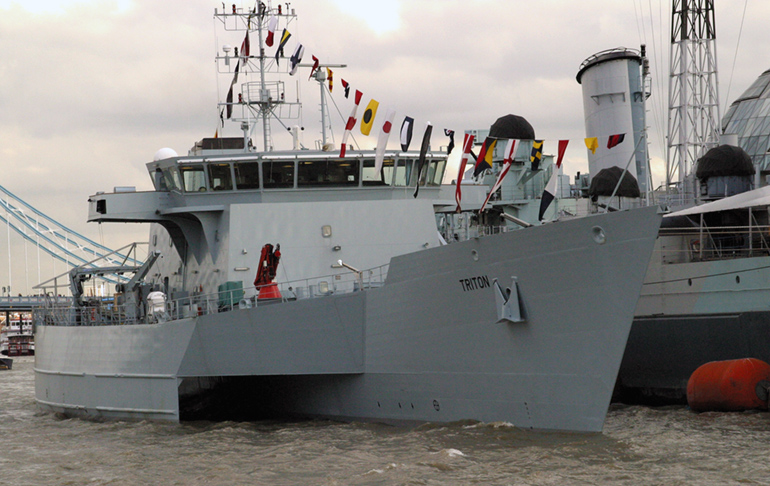
- RV Triton berthed alongside HMS Belfast in the Pool of London

History

United Kingdom
- Name: RV Triton
- Namesake: Triton
- Ordered: August 1998
- Builder: VT Group
- Cost: c. £20m (incl. £13.5m from VT)
- Launched: 6 May 2000
- Acquired: August 2000
- Fate: Sold to Gardline Marine Sciences, 2005; Leased to Australian Customs and Border Protection Service, December 2006, sold 2015 and laid up in UK.
- Status: She is currently moored in Portland Port, UK, having been moved from Hull in July 2024

Australia
- Name: ACV Triton
- Acquired: December 2006
- Decommissioned: 2015
- In service: 2006–2015
- Identification: IMO number: 4906551; MMSI number: 235114368; Callsign: 2JAU7
- Fate: Sold and returned to UK
- Status: Laid up as of 2017

General characteristics
- Tonnage: 2,236 GT
- Length: 318 ft 3 in (97.00 m)
- Beam: 73 ft 8 in (22.45 m)
- Draught: 10 ft (3.0 m)
- Propulsion: Diesel-electric propulsion, single shaft
- Speed: 20 knots (37 km/h; 23 mph)
- Range: 3,000 nmi (5,600 km; 3,500 mi) at 12 knots (22 km/h; 14 mph)
- Complement: 14 crew and up to 28 customs officers (Australian service)
- Armament: 2 × .50 calibre heavy machine guns (Australian service)

The research vessel Triton is a trimaran vessel owned by Gardline Marine Sciences Limited and a former prototype British warship demonstrator for the UK's Defence Evaluation and Research Agency (later QinetiQ). She was built as a technology demonstrator ship for the Royal Navy's Future Surface Combatant, and has been used to both prove the viability of the hull-form and as a trials platform for other QinetiQ innovations. The ship was used by the Australian Border Force's Marine Unit, and was for a time moored in the River Fal near the King Harry chain ferry. Up until July 2019 she was moored on the River Yare, Great Yarmouth in Norfolk, England.

The genus for the Triton was investigative work undertaken in the 1990s by Professor Douglas Pattison RCNC and then Professor David Andrews RCNC, with researcher Jun Wu Zhang at University College London. The Future Escort project Chief Constructor Simon Rusling RCNC determined that a two-third scale demonstrator would be required to demonstrate that a trimaran should be considered as a viable option. The concept was supported by Captain Philip Wilcocks at the Directorate of Operational Requirements (Sea Systems). Chris Stonehouse RCNC at the Defence Evaluation and Research Agency created a business case for the construction of a demonstrator.

== Construction ==
In August 1998, the UK Ministry of Defence (MoD) awarded a contract to Vosper Thornycroft to construct the trimaran, at a cost of £13.5m. RV Triton was launched at Woolston in May 2000 and delivered in August 2000. Triton then began a two-year risk reduction trials programme for the UK MoD and the US Department of Defense.

The vessel's three parallel hulls are reflected in her name which refers to the maritime god Triton who carried the three-pronged spear, the trident. The outriggers are thinner and much shorter than the dominant central hull.

== Operational history ==
=== DERA and QinetiQ ===
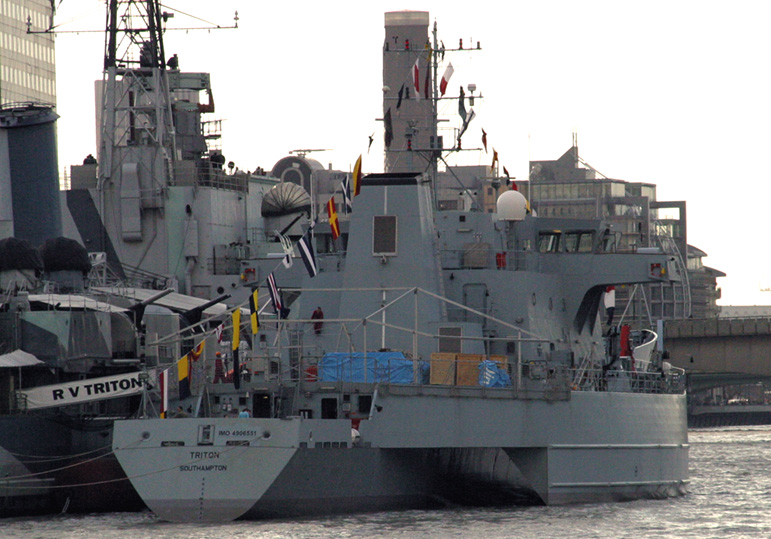
QinetiQ RV Triton

Triton was designed as a demonstrator to prove that the trimaran concept would work successfully in a large warship. Following her launch in 2000, the ship began an extensive series of trials in 2001, which covered general ship handling, performance, sea-keeping behaviour, but also areas more specific to its design for which the Royal Navy had no experience. For example, a series of docking manoeuvres were undertaken by the pilot boats of HMNB Portsmouth to determine the problems of docking a large trimaran, and the ship underwent underway replenishment alongside HMS Argyll and the tanker RFA Brambleleaf to ascertain the characteristics of a trimaran and a monohull replenishing at the same time. Triton also undertook the first helicopter take off and landing on a trimaran.

=== Gardline Marine Sciences ===
In January 2005, Triton was sold to Gardline Marine Sciences, a UK company based in Great Yarmouth, Norfolk. Triton was used for hydrographic survey work for the civil hydrography programme (CHP) on behalf of the Maritime and Coastguard Agency (MCA). The vessel was fitted with a sensor suite which includes the Kongsberg Simrad EM1002 multibeam echo-sounder, a GPS attitude/heading system, surface navigation and ultra-short baseline sub-surface acoustic tracking system, Gardline Voyager5 integrated survey system and Caris post-processing system. The vessel was enhanced by Gardline by installing a bowthrust unit, additional accommodation and survey equipment facilities. In 2009, two new MTU engines were fitted; MTU 16v 4000 M40B. Output 2,080 kW (2,790 hp) each.

=== Australian Customs ===
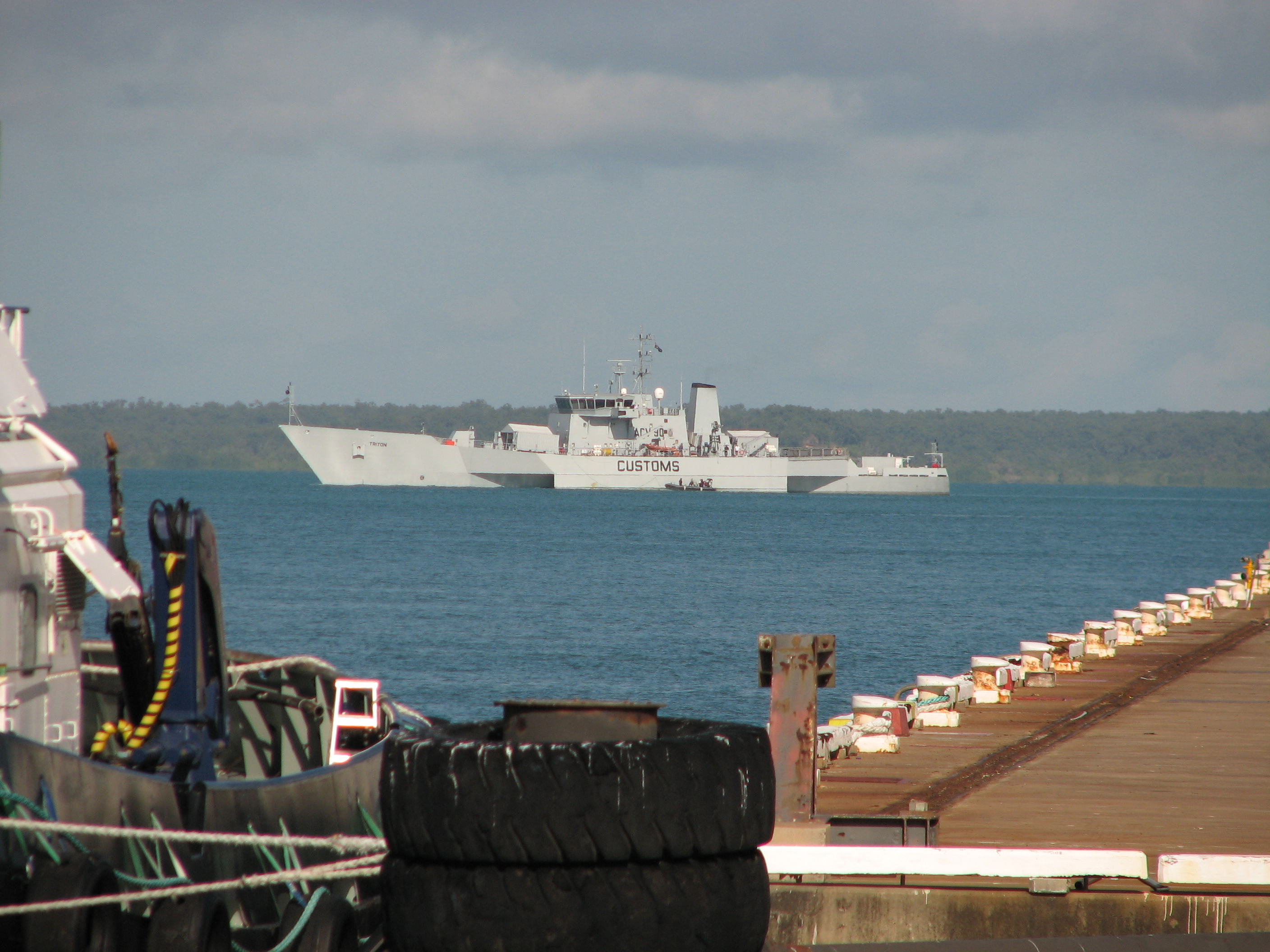
Triton in 2007

In December 2006, Gardline contracted Triton to the Australian Customs and Border Protection Service to patrol Australia's northern waters as one of the service's fleet of patrol vessels. Australian Customs Vessel Triton has been fitted with two .50 calibre heavy machine guns and carries up to 28 armed customs officers. The vessel is also equipped with two 7.3 m (24 ft) high-speed rigid hull inflatable boats (RHIBs). The ship arrived from the UK in mid-January 2007 and started operations immediately. Austere accommodation is provided for 100 embarked persons in addition to conventional accommodation for 45.

== See also ==
- List of multihulls
