= 2026 drone incidents in Romania =

Violation of Romanian airspace and territorial waters by drones

- Part of the violations of non-combatant airspace during the Russo-Ukrainian war (2022–present)
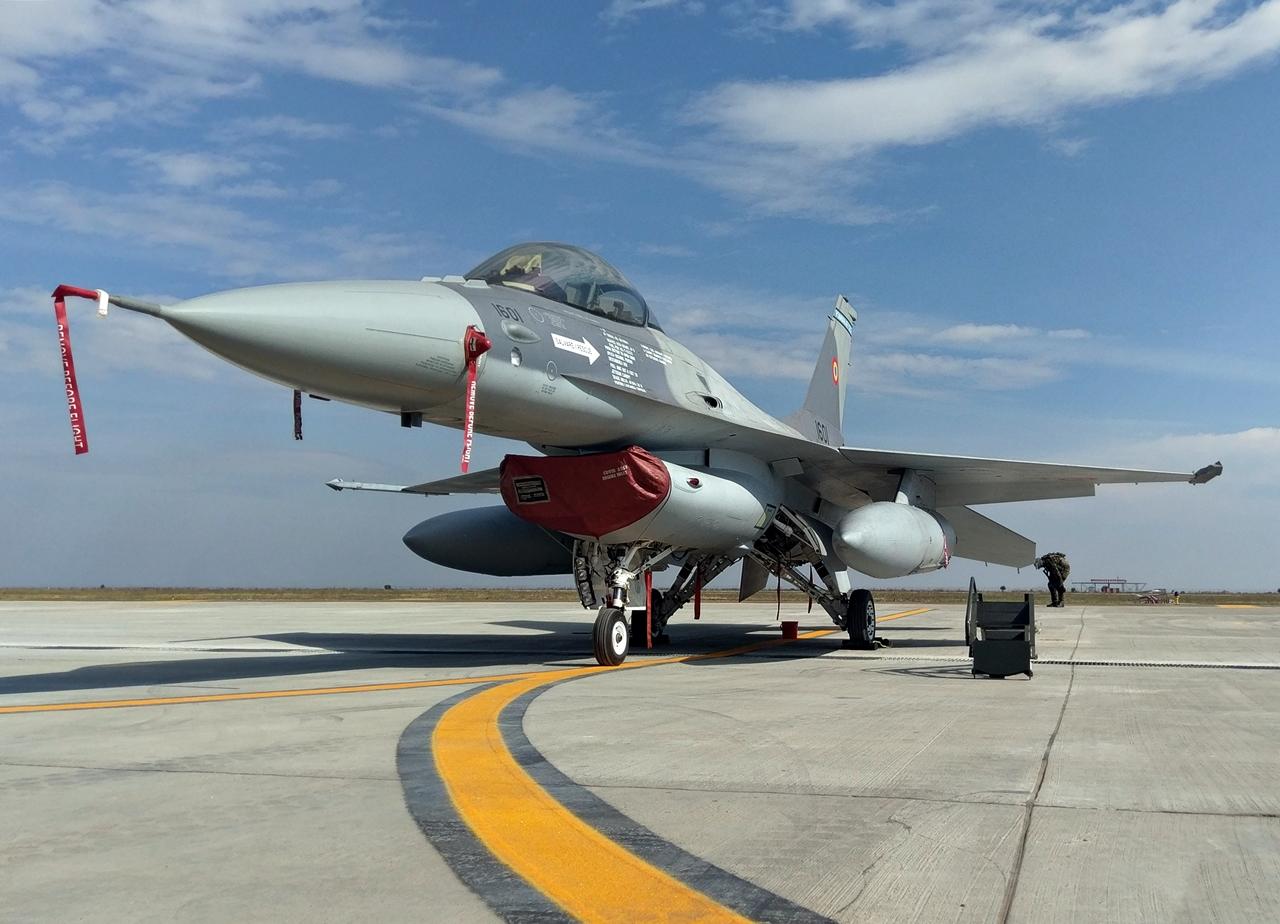
- The Romanian F-16 which downed a Russian drone on 26 July
Date	25 February 2026 – present
Location	Romania, and the Black Sea (spillovers in Bulgaria and Moldova)
Result	Russian consulate-general in Constanța closed in May; Romanian consulate-general in Sankt Petersburg closed in June; Romanian ambassador to Moscow re-called in July

Belligerents
Russia	Ukraine	Romania Bulgaria Moldova Military support: NATO; United Kingdom; Italy; Spain; Diplomatic support: European Union

Commanders and leaders
(Russia) Vladimir Putin	(Ukraine) Volodymyr Zelenskyy	(Romania) Nicușor Dan

Casualties and losses
6 aerial drones shot down 1 naval drone destroyed	2 naval drones self-destroyed	1 apartment building damaged 5 cars damaged 8 ships damaged 2 ships sunk
- 2 Romanian civilians injured 2 sailors dead 10 sailors missing

In 2026, several major drone incidents took place in Romania. These included a Russian unmanned aerial vehicle (UAV) crashing into a residential building in Galați and a Ukrainian naval drone exploding in the Port of Constanța. The same year saw the first Russian drones shot down over the country.

Since the escalation of the Russo-Ukrainian war following Russia's full-scale invasion of Ukraine on 24 February 2022, several non-combatant countries in the proximity of the conflict reported breaches of their airspace by either Russia or Ukraine. As of 15 November 2026, Romania has been the country reporting the most incidents, with 81 incidents of drone debris found on its territory and 58 breaches of its airspace or maritime boundary recorded since 2022.

The incidents in Romania have increased in frequency and intensity in the first months of 2026, after previously mostly ranging from drone fragments found in uninhabited areas close to the border with Ukraine to short-time breaches over Romanian land or sea before entering Ukraine. The violations mostly took place in the proximity of Ukraine's inland ports on the Danube, which also forms the entire southern section of the Romania-Ukraine border, but minor incidents and breaches also happened on the northern section.

Since most of the incidents involved Russian UAVs, a diplomatic row between Romania and the Russian Federation began in May 2026, when Romania closed the Russian consulate-general in Constanța, and a month later recalled its ambassador from Moscow. Relations between the two states were already strained by Romania's support for Ukraine, as well as NATO and European Union membership status, contrasting with Russia's animosity toward those blocs. Rarely, violations also involved Ukrainian maritime drones, all of the time due to Russia's electronic war against Ukrainian military assets.

Some breaches of Romanian airspace coincided with breaches of Moldovan airspace. Additionally, on 8 August, Bulgaria reported its first airspace violation when a Ukrainian drone crashed near Kardam, a few hundred meters from the Romanian border, with the drone flying over Romanian airspace before the crash.

== Background ==
Romania has supported Ukraine's territorial integrity since the first days of the Russo-Ukrainian war and has intensivelly aided Ukraine, with both humanitarian and military means, since the escalation of the conflict in February 2022. In response, Russia placed Romania on its "unfriendly countries list" one month after the invasion.

The first Romanian airspace violation was accidental and happened during the first hours of the Russian invasion of Ukraine, when a Sukhoi Su-27 of the Ukrainian Air Forces lost contact with its home base and entered Romanian airspace, where it was intercepted and escorted to Bacău. The aircraft and its pilot returned to Ukraine a few days later. Two weeks later, two additional violations were recorded, the first was a Tupolev Tu-141 drone of unknown origin which flew over Romanian airspace before entering Hungarian airspace and eventually crashed in Croatia, and the second involved a Russian Army Orlan-10 drone which crashed on a field near Bistrița, more than 70 km (43 mi) from the Ukrainian border.

More than one year later, in July 2023, Russia began attacking Ukraine's inland ports of Izmail, Reni and Kiliya, all located on the Danube, which marks Ukraine's border with Romania. Recordings taken from the Romanian bank showed drones and rockets striking several targets within the port area. Eventually, in the early hours of 4 September of the same year, an off-course Russian drone crashed on Romanian territory in an uninhabited area near the village of Plauru.

Following this incident, fragments of other drones were discovered on the Romanian bank of the Danube over several months. Other violations of various intensities were recorded over the course of the following year, without causing material damage or casualties. On 17 November 2025, the villages of Ceatalchioi and Plauru were evacuated by the Romanian government after the Turkish ship MT Orinda carrying 4.4 thousand t (9.7 million lb) of liquefied petroleum gas was attacked by Russia in the port of Izmail, presenting a significant risk of explosion.

Besides naval mines found drifting in the Black Sea, nine of which have been destroyed by the Romanian Naval Forces, naval drones have also entered Romania's exclusive economic zone. The first such incident happened in 2024, when a drone was discovered 20 nautical miles off Tuzla in April of that year. With the intensification of Ukrainian attacks on the Russian shadow fleet in the Black Sea, another incident happened in December 2025 when a Sea Baby drone was identified drifting 25 miles east off Constanța. In both cases, the drones were destroyed by Romanian EOD divers.

== Incidents ==
=== Aerial incidents ===
==== Early events ====
The first incident of a drone entering Romanian airspace in 2026 happened on 25 February, when a Russian drone entered the airspace near Sfântu Gheorghe, Tulcea and left 20 minutes later near Sulina. Other short incursions took place in March and April.

On 25 April, 15 one-way attack drones were detected by radar in Ukrainian airspace over Reni. As a result, two Royal Air Force Eurofighter Typhoon fighters on Quick Reaction Alert as part of Operation Biloxi at the 86th Air Base were scrambled by CAOC Torrejón, while Romanian anti-air defences were placed on high alert. The British fighters detected an aerial contact about 1.5 km (0.93 mi) from Reni and were authorized to engage. As the drone did not enter Romanian airspace, the Typhoons did not shoot it down and returned to base. Subsequently, a drone entered Romanian airspace, flying at low altitude over Lake Brateș and crashed in the Bariera Traian quarter of Galați, damaging an electricity pole and a household workshop. The same day, other drone fragments were discovered in Văcăreni, Tulcea County. A second drone with explosives on board was identified near Văcăreni again on 26 April.

On 3 May, a drone without explosives fell near Șerbăuți, Suceava County, 20 km (12 mi) from the border with Ukraine.

==== Galați incident ====
Shortly after midnight on 29 May, a Russian Geran-2 drone was detected near the border and monitored for several minutes before entering Romanian airspace at 1:53 AM. Earlier, two F-16 jets and an IAR 330 helicopter of the Romanian Air Force were scrambled from the 86th Air Base. Visual contact was reported shortly after 2 AM, but was lost while the drone was approaching the southern quarters of Galați.

Minutes later, an explosion was reported at a ten-storey apartment building in the Mazepa quarter. The stray drone had crashed on the building's roof, right above an apartment, setting it on fire after the explosion. Its residents, a 51-year-old woman and her 14-year-old son, were injured but managed to self-evacuate. The explosion destroyed the apartment and the roof and also affected several other apartments in the same building. Five cars were damaged by falling debris as well.

The building was evacuated, and the street was blocked for several hours, while the injured were hospitalized. The drone's origin was determined shortly after, when the Russian inscription "ГЕРАН-2" (Geran-2) was identified on a discovered drone flap.

==== Following events ====
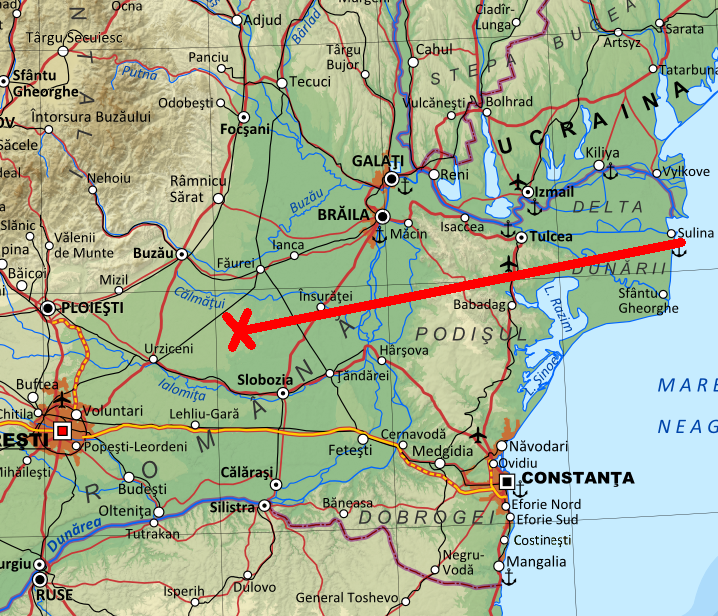
Approximate flightpath of the drone from Sulina to Padina on 24 July

In the morning of 24 July, a drone, later identified as a Russian Geran-2, was detected 20 km (12 mi) off Sulina. Two Italian Air Force Eurofighters from the 57th Air Base on the NATO enhanced air policing mission, two Romanian Air Force F-16s from the 86th Air Base, and an IAR 330 SOCAT helicopter were scrambled in response. According to the press conference held by the Chief of the Romanian General Staff, the drone was tracked on its linear flightpath on the Sulina-Brăila-Fetești-Buzău route for 80 minutes, before it was engaged over safe ground. An Italian fighter launched a missile at it while over Brăila County, but missed. The Romanian F-16s engaged the drone afterwards and one fighter shot it down with an AIM-9X Sidewinder air-to-air missile over Padina, Buzău. The drone crashed in a field between Padina and Pogoanele. Less than 24 hours later, a second drone was destroyed over Sfântu Gheorghe by the same pilot who shot down the previous drone. This incident happened after a group of drones was identified by radar north-west of Snake Island, and the drone that breached Romanian airspace was shot down after 11 minutes. On 26 July, a third drone was shot down over Romania's territorial waters, 12 km (7.5 mi) north-east off Sulina, 5 minutes after it had entered Romanian airspace. This event marked the third time, in three consecutive days, when drones were shot down in Romania.

On 27 July, a short incursion by a Russian drone was detected. The drone quickly passed into Ukrainian airspace before it could be intercepted. In the morning on 2 August, a drone was detected near the border. The drone did not enter Romanian airspace. Later that day, another drone flew over Romania's territorial waters, then continued along the Sulina branch of the Danube. Two Romanian F-16s were sent to monitor the drone. After 20 minutes, it crossed into Ukraine and was shot down by the Ukrainian forces. Drone debris fell in a field near Periprava, Tulcea.

On 8 August, a drone crashed and exploded in Bulgaria near Kardam, close to the Romanian border and 1 km (0.62 mi) away from a compressor station of the Trans-Balkan pipeline. The drone, identified as a Ukrainian Maya decoy drone, passed over Romanian airspace before entering Bulgaria, as stated by Bulgarian Prime Minister Rumen Radev. Neither Romania nor Bulgaria detected the drone on radar.

On 16 August, a Geran-2 drone that flew over Moldova between Etulia and Slobozia Mare entered Romanian airspace and was shot down approximately 24 km (15 mi) from Galați by an F-18 fighter jet of the Spanish Air Force on QRA at the 57th Air Base. The drone crashed in an uninhabited area between Băleni and Cudalbi.

On 20 August, a group of drones was detected flying close to the border with Ukraine at 2:23 AM. Two Spanish F-18s and a Romanian IAR 330 were scrambled. One drone subsequently entered Romanian airspace and crashed in a field, 4 km (2.5 mi) from Grindu, Tulcea, as reported by the Romanian helicopter. The remains, determined to not pose any risks of explosion, were taken by the Romanian Border Police for further analysis.

On 24 August, a Russian drone crashed into a walnut tree in the village of Ciușlea, Vrancea County, 5 m (16 ft) away from a household. The drone was intermittently tracked over Moldova, coming from Vynohradivka and entering the airspace at Vulcănești. It subsequently left Moldova near Pașcani and crossed into Romania, heading towards Târgu Bujor. It last appeared on radar near Furcenii Noi. Two F-16s and an IAR 330 were previously scrambled before the drone disappeared from radar. The locals from Ciușlea heard the UAV but the drone was only discovered after a strong smell of fuel was reported. The area was evacuated, and it was later established that the drone did not carry any explosives.

At 16:37 on 8 September, a Russian jet-powered drone, later identified as a Geran-4, entered Romanian airspace from Moldova. The drone previously entered Moldovan airspace from Ukraine, crossed over the Transnistrian territory, approached Chișinău and Ungheni, then left Moldova near Zagarancea. Subsequently, the drone flew over Romania, getting within 18 km (11 mi) of Roman, Neamț County before disappearing from radar between the Botoșani and Iași counties. The drone was detected again at 17:08 in Moldova and eventually crashed near Mihăilenii Vechi in the Rîșcani District. Alerts were issued across the respective counties, and flights at the Iași International Airport were suspended. Two Spanish F-18s were scrambled from Mihail Kogălniceanu to monitor the situation during the incident. Additionally, 11 other NATO aircraft, including E-3 Sentry AWACS, Airbus A330 MRTT tankers, as well as Dassault Rafale and F-16 fighters, were conducting an exercise in the Black Sea area but did not spot the drone. According to a statement by the Norwegian Prime Minister, Jonas Gahr Støre, and confirmed by the Moldovan Government, the flight of the drone endangered the aircraft carrying President Volodymyr Zelenskyy to Norway which was preparing to take off from Chișinău International Airport.

In the morning of 24 September, a drone that was detected by Romanian radar over Ukraine near Botoșani County entered Romanian airspace and crashed near Solca, Suceava County, after flying for four minutes in Romania. Romania scrambled two F-16s in response, but they could not catch the drone before it crashed. Earlier in the night, two Spanish F-18s were scrambled to monitor the airspace along the southern border. As a result of this incident, school classes were suspended until 10 AM in four settlements in the area. The incident took place amid a Russian attack on Ukraine, and at least four other Russian drones entered Moldovan airspace.

Another two Russian jet-powered Geran-4 drones were shot down by Romanian F-16s over Romanian territorial waters on 17 October. The drones were part of a group of aerial targets spotted flying near Snake Island. The two fighters on Air Policing duty were preemptively scrambled from the Borcea air base and engaged the drones within two minutes of entering Romanian airspace. First drone was shot down at 18:01, second drone at 18:05.

Two Russian Gerbera drones further breached Romanian airspace on 31 October. After the drones entered from Moldova, RO-Alert warnings were triggered in six counties and flights from three airports were temporarily suspended. F-16s from the 86th Air Base and the 71st Air Base, as well as an IAR 330 SOCAT were scrambled in response. One drone left Romanian airspace, while the other disappeared from radar between the Vaslui and Bacău counties.

=== Naval incidents ===
Rescue ships near the capsized Khoryv on 23 October, view from a French Atlantique 2

On 5 June, four Ukrainian Sargan-3000 unmanned surface vehicles were jammed by Russian electronic warfare. One drone entered the port of Constanța and was caught in the anti-pollution buoys of Berth 78 at around 6:30 AM. The area was evacuated and secured by the Romanian Intelligence Service, the Coast Guard and the Ministry of National Defence. At around 10:00 AM, the Ukrainian Navy informed its Romanian counterpart about the drone's self-detonation scheduled timeframe. Subsequently, the naval drone exploded without causing additional damage. At around 11:00 AM, a second drone self-detonated outside the port, as observed by a Romanian Coast Guard vessel. Two other drones self-destructed far offshore in the Black Sea.

On 21 July, an LPG tanker caught fire after an explosion in the Black Sea, around 26 km (16 mi) off Sfântu Gheorghe. According to the crewmen, the ship had been attacked by three drones during the night. This event occurred outside Romania's territorial waters according to President Nicușor Dan. Romanian authorities evacuated the ship's crew, and three injured sailors were transported to the emergency hospital in Tulcea. One of the sailors later died as a result of his injuries. Three days later, a Liberian-flagged bulk carrier transporting coal from the USA to Ukraine was hit either by a naval mine or a maritime drone within Romania's exclusive economic zone, 22 miles off Sfântu Gheorghe. No casualties were registered on board the vessel, and the ship requested docking in Constanța or Varna for necessary repairs.

On 11 August, two Russian Gerbera drones found floating inside Romania's Black Sea exclusive economic zone, near the Neptun Deep project offshore platform, were destroyed by Romanian Navy EOD divers. The drones were reported earlier by the crew of a civilian vessel working near the platform. The two drones, which may have carried explosive charges, along with fragments from another drone, were identified by Romanian naval personnel brought in by a Romanian Coast Guard vessel and were safely destroyed to ensure the safety of navigation and the ongoing works.

On 20 August, a Russian naval drone was sunk in the Black Sea in a combined air and surface action by Romanian forces. The explosive naval drone was detected 80 nautical miles off Constanța, near Neptun Alpha (the Neptun Deep platform), in the morning. Initially, an EOD team aboard a Coast Guard vessel was dispatched, then it was considered to send out two fast intervention craft to destroy the drone. However, due to the distance involved and the urgency of the situation, a Romanian F-16 element was dispatched instead. One F-16 then proceeded to destroy the drone with its 20 mm onboard cannon in three strafing runs. On the way to the site, a similar drone was reported. Later, it was confirmed to be the same drone which had not been completely destroyed and it was subsequently blown up by the EOD team as it was slowly taking on water and sinking from the previous attack. According to Defense Minister Radu Miruță the drone was not Ukrainian, as confirmed by the Ukrainian authorities through the direct communication channel. President Dan attributed the incident to Russia.

On 23 August, Romanian Navy EOD divers brought in by a Coast Guard patrol ship neutralized a floating fragment of a Gerbera aerial drone carrying explosives in the Black Sea, off Gura Portiței, Tulcea county.

On 28 August, the Dominican-flagged freighter Progress IV transporting sugar to Turkey, with the last port of call at Sulina, caught fire off Sfântu Gheorghe and sank. Twelve sailors, 8 from Ukraine and 4 from Azerbaijan, were rescued by the Romanian Coast Guard and a nearby civilian ship. One of the crewmen was seriously injured. According to President Dan, a drone attack is suspected. Two fighter jets sent to investigate the area reported detecting debris from an object close to Snake Island.

Wine Trader, one of the ships involved in the 15 October incident, pictured in 2018

Two chemical tankers were hit by Russian unmanned aerial vehicles close to Sulina on 15 October. The Comoros-flagged Yara J, anchored about 8-10 miles off Sulina, in Romanian territorial waters, was struck and caught fire. No casualties reported among the crew. The other ship was the San Marino-flagged Wine Trader which was hit about one mile outside Romania's territorial waters. Five crewmen aboard Wine Trader were rescued while seven others went missing; six from Benin and one Russian. The sailors reported that three drones struck the ship: two hit the living quarters, and one hit the deck. A search and rescue mission was organized with two Black Hawk helicopters and two rescue ships, but could not find the missing sailors.

On 23 October, another ship was hit by a Russian drone and sank 13 nmi (24 km; 15 mi) off the Romanian port of Constanța, just outside Romania's territorial waters. Casualties registered on the Comoros-flagged ore/oil bulk carrier Khoryv included three missing and one dead, while nine sailors were rescued from the sea. A search and rescue operation for the missing crew was organized in the aftermath.

Between 13 and 14 November, four ships were damaged by drones in Romania's territorial waters off Sulina. The Romanian Air Force scrambled fighter jets on two occasions in response, while the fires aboard the vessels were extinguished by their crews. No casualties were reported.

== Reactions ==
In the aftermath of the 29 May incident, the convened Romanian Supreme Council of National Defence decided to close the Russian consulate-general in Constanța and declare its consul-general a persona non grata. President Dan also declared that should such incidents continue to occur, the Russian ambassador in Bucharest will be expelled. Following the three drone incidents in July, Romania recalled its ambassador from Moscow and expelled a Russian diplomat from the embassy in Bucharest.

In response to the naval drone incidents, the Romanian Coast Guard acquired two Ocean Aero Triton Autonomous Underwater and Surface Vehicle systems, strengthening the maritime drone detection capabilities around the port of Constanța. Romanian Defense Minister Radu Miruță further requested the Ukrainian side to implement a solution whereby Ukrainian naval drones will self-detonate if they come within 12 nautical miles off Romania's coast. A direct communication channel between Ukraine and Romania was established in July to handle such incidents in the future.

Shortly after the incident on 16 October, a meeting was held between the NATO secretary general, and the presidents of Romania and Bulgaria. In the meeting, Romania requested additional equipment as well as to accelerate the delivery of previously acquired equipment. According to President Dan following the meeting, NATO members will hold further talks regarding the crisis.

=== International reactions ===
After the drone crash in Galați, NATO allies agreed to supplement the air defence of Romania. Spain announced plans to send two NH90 helicopters to Romania and Italy to increase its presence with another 100 soldiers. Secretary General Mark Rutte expressed solidarity with Romania and reaffirmed that NATO is ready to defend "every inch" of allied territory. NATO again confirmed its commitment to respond permanently to any aerial threat in defense of allied territory after the shoot down incidents.

President of the European Commission Ursula von der Leyen condemned the incident and pinned the blame on Russia, expressing support for Romania while also announcing the 21st sanction package to Russia. Several other European and international leaders expressed support for Romania.

At the end of July, the NATO Allied Air Command announced that Spain will rotate forces with Italy at the Mihail Kogălniceanu Air Base. The Spanish deployment consists of seven F-18M fighter jets and approximately 200 personnel from the Spanish Air and Space Force. The "Paznic" detachment also includes an A400M aircraft for in-flight refueling and three NH90 helicopters used on counter-UAS (C-UAS) missions. This mission is part of the Air Defence framework activated through the enhanced vigilance activity Eastern Sentry, which aims to provide more flexibility and protect allied territory against a wide range of threats.

The Russian drone incursions in Romania have been described as a serious escalation by the European Union bodies, who voiced their support for Romania. Following the drone shoot down incidents, European Council President António Costa further pledged to improve Romania's security and deterrence against airspace violations, and expressed full solidarity with the country.

The Ukrainian Ministry of Foreign Affairs condemned the Russian violations of Romanian airspace. Minister Andrii Sybiha called for a "comprehensive deterrence package against Russia", which is to include stronger international sanctions and a "joint effort to shield Europe's skies from Russian terror". At the same time, Minister Sybiha warned that "every weak response only encourages Moscow to raise the stakes".

Following the destruction of the naval drone near the Neptun Deep platform, European Commission President Ursula von der Leyen mentioned the incident is part of an "escalating campaign of threats" and the EU is facing a hybrid warfare campaign. She further mentioned that Europe is scaling up production to deliver defence capabilities to the member states through the European Drone Defence Initiative and Eastern Flank Watch as part of the Readiness 2030 agenda.

After a NATO meeting regarding Black Sea security held on 20 October, it was announced that more maritime patrol aircraft, radar systems and drones will be sent in the region. NATO intelligence agents and teams will also arrive in the region to conduct forensic analysis of explosives. At Romania's request due to the deteriorating security situation, France deployed an Atlantique 2 maritime patrol aircraft at the Mihail Kogălniceanu Air Base for surveillance and reconnaissance missions in the western Black Sea.

=== Russian response ===
Following Romania's closure of Russia's consulate-general, the Russian Foreign Ministry announced that the Romanian consulate-general in Saint Petersburg will be closed. Attending a summit in Kazakhstan, Vladimir Putin called for access to the drone debris to confirm its origin after previously denying the drone was Russian. The Romanian authorities did not grant this request.

Through a post from the embassy in Romania on 28 July, Russia called the drone incursions "alleged" violations of Romania's airspace. Maria Zakharova, the spokeswoman for the Russian Ministry of Foreign Affairs, referred to the drone shootdowns as "staged" and accused Romania of "irresponsible policy of supporting the regime in Kyiv". After the expulsion of Russia's diplomat, ambassador Vladimir Lipayev stated that Romania's actions "will not go unanswered".

On 27 August, Romania's chargé d'affaires in Russia was summoned by the Russian Foreign Ministry and a Romanian employee of the Romanian Embassy was declared persona non grata. The measure came as a response to Romania's previous decision to expel a Russian diplomat in July.

== See also ==
- 2025 Russian drone incursion into Poland
- 2026 drone incursions into the Baltic states and Finland
- 2026 Leipzig Airport drone attack
- Øresund drone incident
- Romania–Russia relations
- Romania–Ukraine relations
