= 2025 MT Orinda fire =

MT Orinda fire
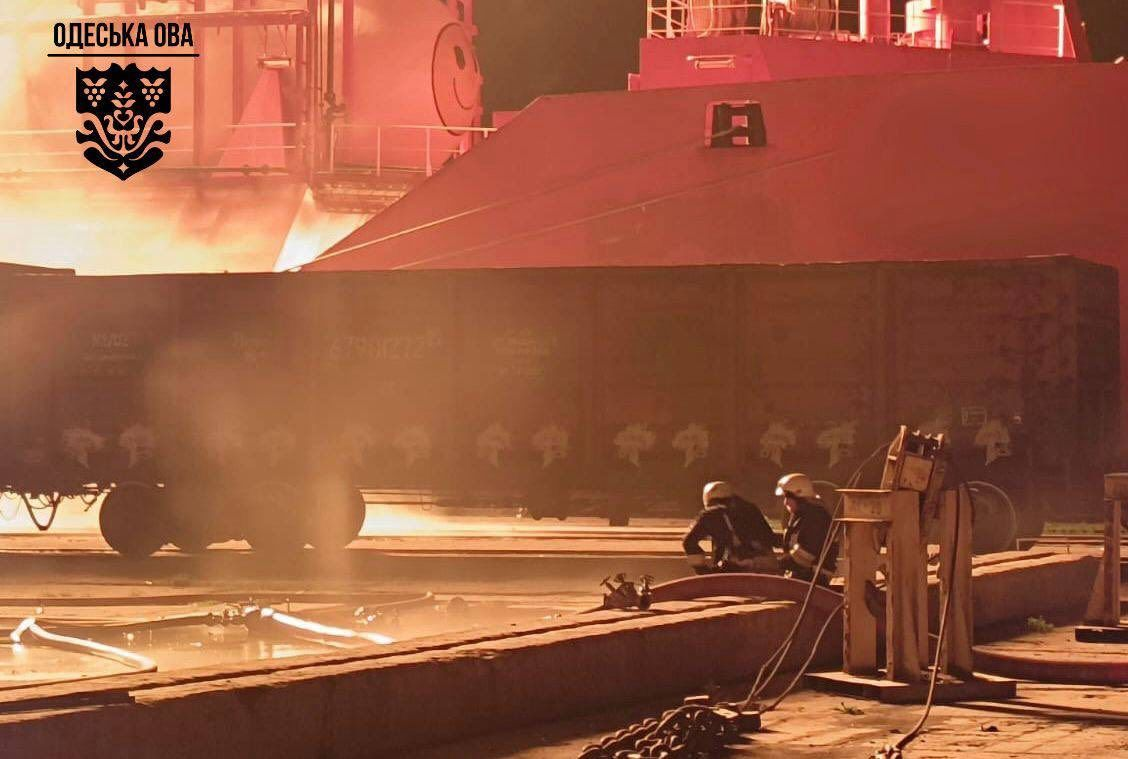
- Orinda burning at the berth
- Date: November 17, 2025
- Time: c. 02:00 EET (UTC+02:00) (EET)
- Duration: 1 day and 7 hours
- Location: Port of Izmail, Ukraine; 45.328021°N 28.831818°E
- Type: Maritime incident, Fire
- Cause: Russian drone strike
- Target: Port infrastructure, civilian vessels
- Perpetrator: Russian Armed Forces
- Outcome: Fire extinguished, vessel moved to safe anchorage
- Deaths: 0
- Injuries: 1 (on separate vessel)
- Property damage: Vessel damaged
- Displaced: ~250 (in Romania)

The MT Orinda fire was an incident that occurred on 17 November 2025, when the Turkish-flagged LPG tanker MT Orinda caught fire following a Russian drone attack on the Port of Izmail, Ukraine. The 23-year-old vessel, a semi-refrigerated gas carrier built in Shanghai, China, was struck while offloading cargo at the port on the Danube River, leading to a massive fire and the evacuation of nearby Romanian villages due to explosion risks.

== Background ==
MT Orinda (IMO 9240122) is a semi-refrigerated liquefied gas carrier built in 2002 by Hudong-Zhonghua Shipbuilding in Shanghai, China. Originally delivered as Norgas Orinda and later known as Coral Orinda, the vessel was acquired by the Turkish firm Orinda Denizcilik (a subsidiary of Lokal Enerji) in March 2023, at which point it was reflagged from Singapore to Turkey and registered in Istanbul. At the time of the attack, the vessel was operated by BMA Gemi İşletmeciliği Ltd. Şti. (BMA Denizcilik) with an all-Turkish crew.

The ship has an overall length of 124.9 m (410 ft), a beam of 19.8 m (65 ft), and a total cargo volume of 8,550 m^{3} (302,000 cu ft) across two independent tanks. The vessel's cargo system is designed to handle products with vapour pressures up to 7 bar. At the time of the attack, the vessel was carrying about 4,400 tonnes of liquefied petroleum gas and was in the process of offloading. The cargo was partially intended for the company AGTG, with the remainder destined for Bulmarket in Galați, Romania.

The vessel had been anchored at Izmail since 12 November 2025. Orinda Denizcilik's parent company, Lokal Enerji, lists among its business partners the French company TotalEnergies, British company Shell, and Russian company Lukoil.

Izmail port is located on the Kiliya branch of the Danube River, which forms part of the border between Ukraine and Romania. The Romanian villages of Plauru and Ceatalchioi are situated on the opposite bank of the Danube, the former being approximately 300 to 500 meters from the port area. The port is one of several strategically important facilities for Ukrainian imports and exports, particularly since Russia's full-scale invasion.

== Attack ==
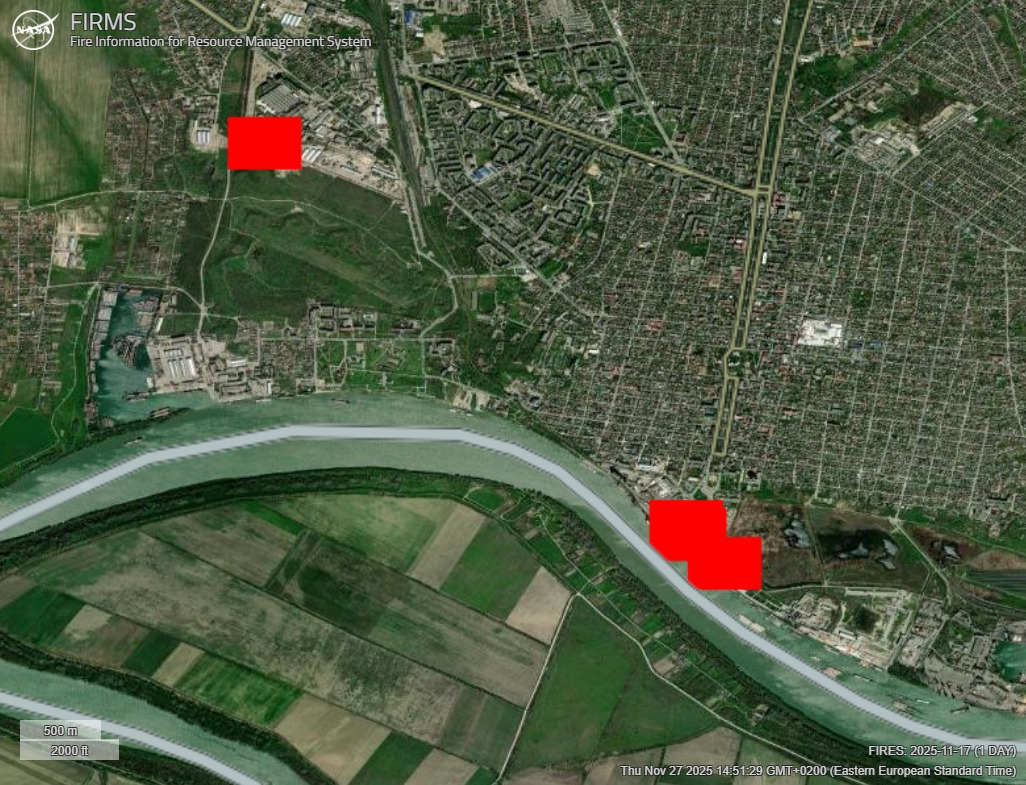
NASA FIRMS map showing fires after the attack

In the early hours of 17 November 2025, Russian forces launched a massive drone attack on the Odesa Oblast, targeting Izmail with multiple waves of Shahed drones between 23:45 on 16 November and 02:50 local time. The attack struck energy infrastructure, port facilities, and several civilian vessels. MT Orinda was hit by a drone at approximately 02:00 while moored at the port during the offloading of liquefied petroleum gas. The strike ignited gas transfer equipment aboard the vessel, causing a large-scale fire. According to Ukrainian Navy spokesman Dmytro Pletenchuk, the captain of MT Orinda had ignored warnings to leave the berth before the attack, as did captains of two other vessels that were also damaged. Other ships that complied with the warnings and moved away from the berth sustained no damage.

The fire was detected from space by NASA's Fire Information for Resource Management System (FIRMS), which recorded thermal anomalies at the location at 03:00 local time and again before 13:00 local time on 17 November.

== Casualties and damage ==
All 16 Turkish crew members evacuated the vessel safely with no injuries reported. One crew member, an 18-year-old chief officer serving on a different vessel (a tanker flying the flag of Palau), sustained shrapnel wounds to the face and eyes and received first aid at the scene.

The attack also damaged several other vessels in Izmail port. The tanker MT Arrow Star 1 (IMO 9435313), which was delivering fuel for the company D.Trading, was damaged during the attack. Additionally, three empty barges belonging to the Izmail port and the Ukrainian Sea Ports Authority, two pontoons, and vessels under Ukrainian flag were damaged. The attack struck energy infrastructure, leaving 32,500 customers without power in Izmail and the village of Broska in Safiany Rural Hromada.

Ukrainian authorities maintained that there were no grounds for evacuating Izmail residents. However, as a precautionary measure, four schools in Izmail—Schools No. 1, 2, 4, and 6—switched to distance learning on 18 November due to their proximity to the port. The schools were located within the potential blast radius, which was calculated to extend up to two kilometers for total destruction of buildings and personnel, with partial destruction possible up to two kilometers and damage to structures extending up to six kilometers.

== Response and firefighting ==
An operational headquarters was established at the scene, headed by the chief of the Izmail Raion Administration. Ukraine's State Emergency Service (DSNS) deployed firefighting units, including teams equipped with robotic firefighting systems. The Ukrainian Navy played a crucial role in extinguishing the fire. A large-capacity vessel was brought to the scene to pump water onto the burning tanks. Navy spokesman Dmytro Pletenchuk stated that their waterborne firefighting capabilities exceeded those of other agencies and were decisive in bringing the blaze under control. The Navy also conducted subsequent operations to secure the vessel and prevent it from sinking.

The fire was extinguished by the morning of 18 November. Izmail Mayor Andrii Abramchenko confirmed that the blaze had been eliminated and that there was no threat to the population. The vessel was subsequently moved under its own power to a safer anchorage on 20 November. Insurance and cargo surveyors boarded the vessel to conduct inspections, and crew changes were completed for seafarers who wished to leave the ship. Discussions with relevant authorities continued regarding the offloading of the remaining cargo.

== Evacuations in Romania ==
Due to the vessel's proximity to Romanian territory and the nature of its cargo, Romanian authorities took precautionary measures. The evacuation operations lasted approximately seven hours and involved nearly 250 people.

At 11:37 AM on 17 November, Romanian authorities issued a RO-ALERT message for the Plauru area in Tulcea County warning of an explosion threat. A second RO-ALERT message was issued at 12:00 with a radius of approximately five kilometers. The village of Plauru, located directly across the Danube from Izmail port, was evacuated. Between 15 and 17 residents were initially evacuated. At 1:00 PM on 17 November, the Tulcea County Emergency Situations Committee ordered the evacuation of Ceatalchioi village as well, based on assessments by Romania's National Commission for Nuclear Activities Control (CNCAN). Both human residents and livestock were evacuated. In total, approximately 180 people self-evacuated while 66 were evacuated by authorities: 51 from Ceatalchioi and 15 from Plauru. A total of 231 residents from Ceatalchioi either self-evacuated or were evacuated by authorities.

Traffic on the Kiliya branch of the Danube was suspended as a precautionary measure. Romanian military personnel who had been stationed in the area to monitor Russian drones were also withdrawn along with their equipment, including a Flakpanzer Gepard anti-aircraft system.

Raed Arafat, head of Romania's Emergency Management Department, stated that if the LPG tanker exploded, it could affect an area with a radius of 4.4 to 4.7 kilometers, potentially causing forest fires and devastating nearby settlements. Another estimate suggested the impact radius could extend to 4.5-5 kilometers. CNCAN clarified that the incident was chemical in nature, not nuclear or radiological, and therefore fell under the responsibility of non-radiological emergency authorities. Following confirmation that the fire had been extinguished, Romanian authorities began allowing residents to return. The evacuation order for Ceatalchioi was lifted at 9:00 AM on 18 November, and residents of Plauru were permitted to return at 2:00 PM the same day.

== Turkish response ==
Turkey's Directorate General for Maritime Affairs confirmed the incident and reported that the 16-member Turkish crew had been safely evacuated with no injuries. BMA Denizcilik, the vessel's operator, issued a statement confirming that the drone strike occurred at approximately 02:00 on 17 November while the vessel was at Izmail port. The company stated that all 16 crew members evacuated the ship safely following emergency procedures and were relocated to a secure area in good health. The statement noted that the fire continued aboard the vessel and that necessary interventions were being coordinated with local authorities and officials, with crew safety as the top priority.

Turkey's Consul General in Odesa, Muhittin Çelik, stated that the vessel was hit shortly after midnight and that consular staff immediately coordinated with local authorities to ensure the crew's safety. He noted that approximately two-thirds of the LPG cargo remained aboard the vessel and that Izmail firefighters were working to cool the ship with water. A technical team from the vessel's company was expected to arrive to assess whether the ship could be refloated.

== Analysis ==
Maritime security analyst Andrii Klymenko of the Black Sea Strategic Studies Institute suggested that the attack on MT Orinda may have been deliberate rather than incidental. He noted that Turkish-flagged vessels account for approximately 40% of all cargo shipments through Ukraine's maritime corridor, making them significant contributors to Ukraine's economy and war effort. Klymenko argued that by targeting a Turkish vessel, Russia was sending a message to Turkey to discourage its shipping companies from continuing to support Ukrainian trade. He noted that unlike ports in Greater Odesa, where AIS transmitters had been disabled following attacks in 2023, Danube ports continued broadcasting vessel positions, meaning Russian forces would have been aware of MT Orinda's identity and flag when planning the attack. Klymenko also observed an emerging trend of intensified Russian attacks on Ukrainian Danube ports, which he suggested was intended to prevent these facilities from serving as backup options when ports in Greater Odesa were targeted.

According to shipping industry sources, the vessel was reportedly in the process of being sold at the time of the attack.

== See also ==
- Russian invasion of Ukraine
- Russian strikes against Ukrainian infrastructure
- Port of Izmail
