= Komyshivka =

Komyshivka (Ukrainian: Комишівка) may refer to the following places in Ukraine:

- Komyshivka, Donetsk Oblast
- Komyshivka, Odesa Oblast
