= Nova Nekrasivka =

Rural locality in Odesa Oblast, Ukraine

Nova Nekrasivka Нова Некрасівка Necrasovca-Nouă
- Village
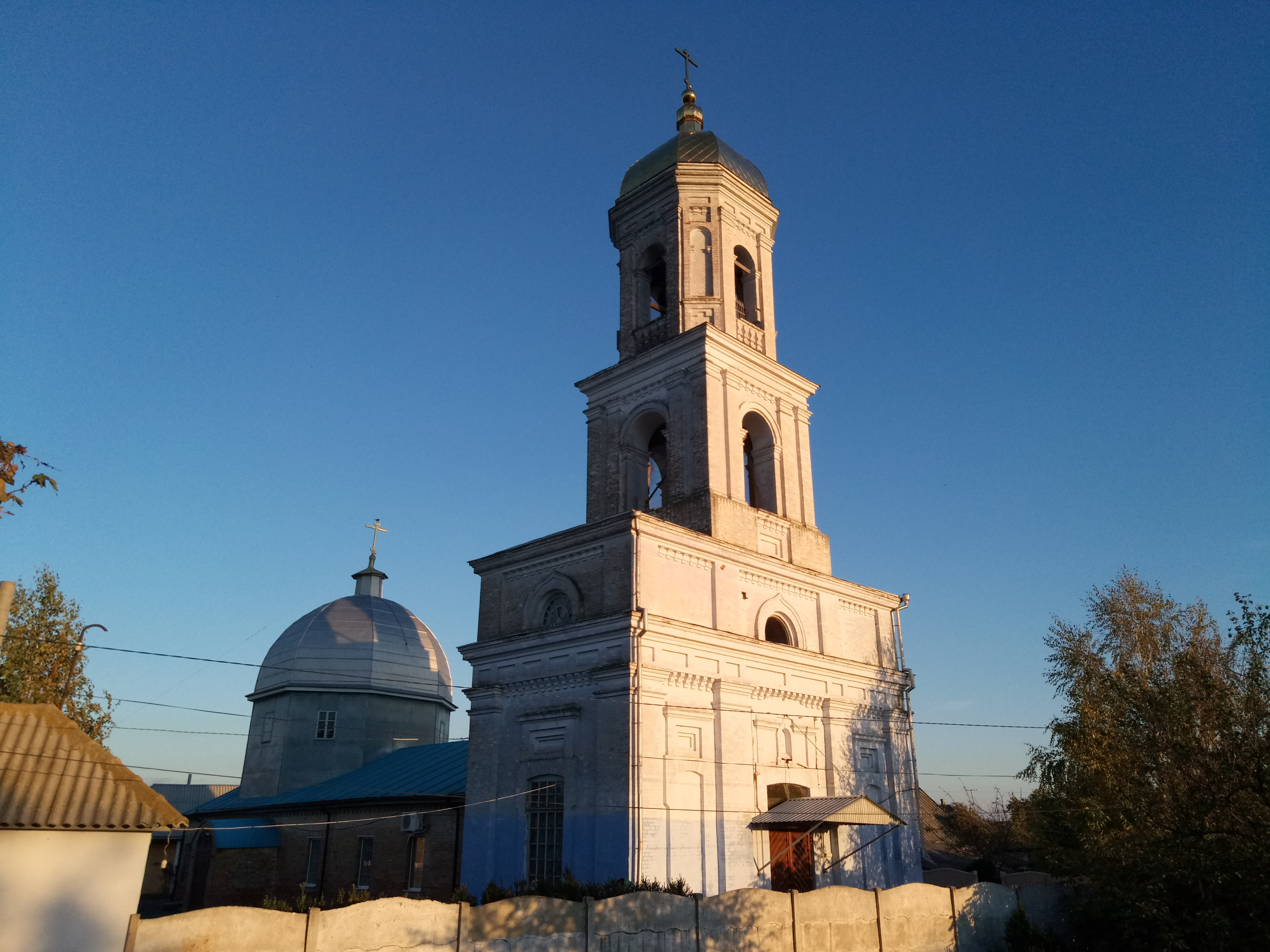
- Interactive map of Nova Nekrasivka
- Location in Ukraine Nova Nekrasivka (Odesa Oblast)
- Coordinates: 45°21′20″N 28°41′41″E
- Country: Ukraine
- Oblast: Odesa Oblast
- Raion: Izmail Raion
- Hromada: Safiany rural hromada
- Elevation: 46 ft (14 m)

Population
  - Total: 2.051
- Time zone: UTC+2 (EET)
  - Summer (DST): UTC+3 (EEST)
- Postal code: 68661
- Area code: +380 4841

Nova Nekrasivka (Ukrainian: Нова Некрасівка; Romanian: Necrasovca-Nouă) is a village in Izmail Raion, Odesa Oblast, Ukraine. It belongs to Safiany rural hromada, one of the hromadas of Ukraine.

== Notable people ==
- Vitalie Zubac

== Demographics ==
1930: 2,378 (census)
1940: 2,552 (estimate)
2001: 2,051 (census)
