= Vitalie Zubac =

Bessarabian politician

Member of the Moldovan Parliament
- In office 1917–1918

Personal details
- Born: Necrasovca-Nouă, Ismail

Vitalie Zubac (born 1894, date of death unknown) was a Bessarabian politician. He was born in Necrasovca-Nouă.

== Biography ==
He served as Member of the Moldovan Parliament (1917–1918).

== Gallery ==
Moldovan stamp, 1998
