= Action of 26 June 1941 =

- Part of the Eastern Front of World War II
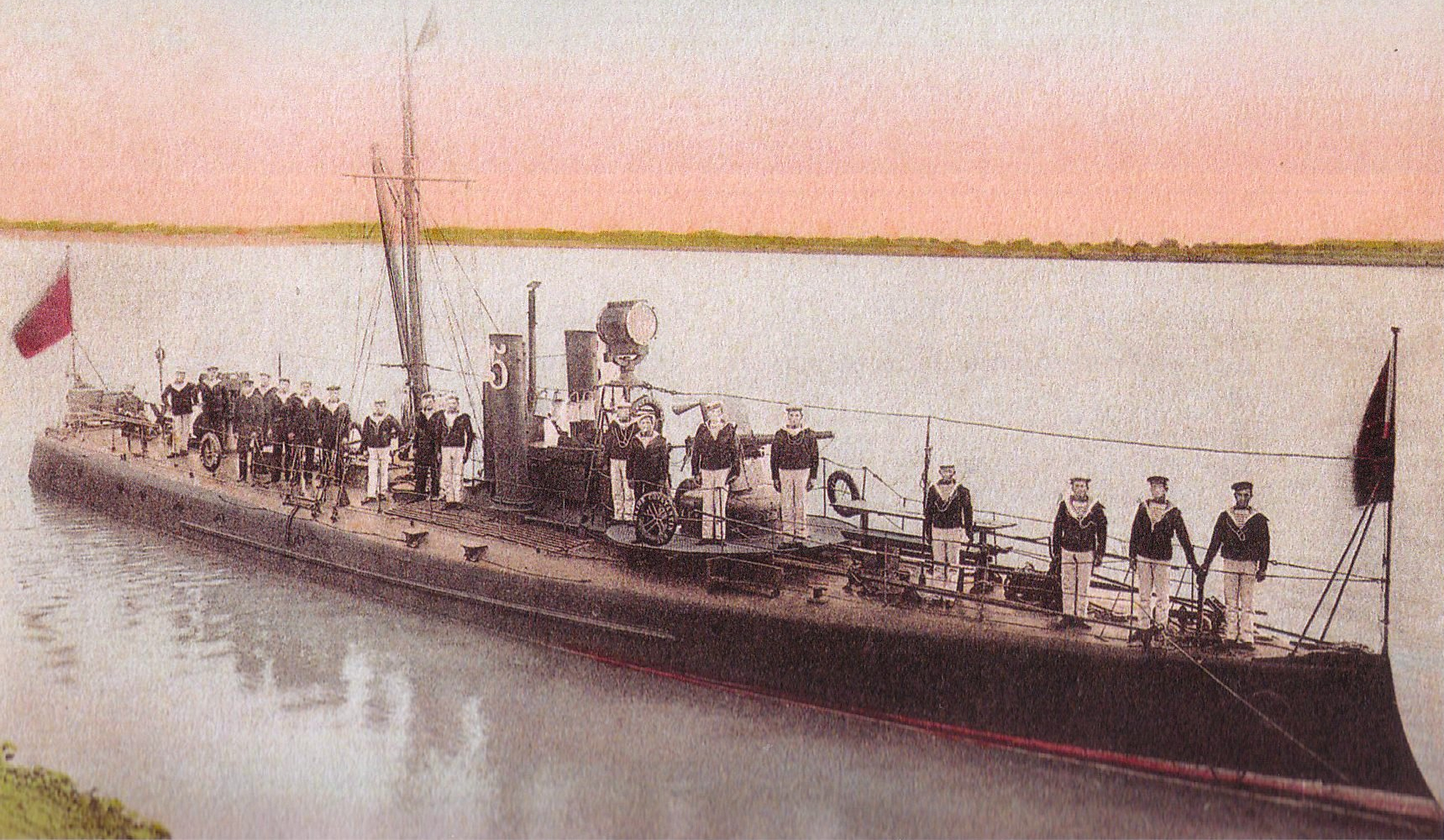
- Romanian V1-class torpedo boat
| Date | 26 June 1941 |
| Location | Near Ceatalchioi, Romania |
| Result | Romanian victory |

Belligerents
| Romania | Soviet Union |

Strength
| 2 torpedo boats | 3 armored motor gunboats |

Casualties and losses
| None | 1 armored motor gunboat damaged (later captured) |

The action of 26 June 1941 consisted in an engagement between the navies of the Soviet Union and the Kingdom of Romania, taking place on the Chilia branch of the Danube Delta, near the commune of Ceatalchioi. The action resulted in a Romanian victory and the withdrawal of the Soviet vessels, one of them being damaged and later captured.

== Background and opposing forces ==
On 22 June 1941, Romania joined the German-led Axis invasion of the Soviet Union, aiming to recover the territories of Bessarabia and Northern Bukovina, occupied by the latter in June 1940. The Chilia branch separated Southern Bessarabia from Romania proper, so control of this waterway was a priority for both the Romanian and the Soviet navies, resulting in several naval engagements between the two.

The Romanian forces participating in this action consisted of two pocket torpedo gunboats, V-1 and V-3, of the Romanian Danube Flotilla. These vessels belonged to a class of 8 units, built in the United Kingdom by Thames Iron Works on Romanian order during 1906–1907. As built, these 50-ton vessels were well-armed for their size: in addition to one 47 mm naval gun and one 6.5 mm machine gun, each boat also carried 4 torpedoes: two on spars in front of the vessel and two more amidships in torpedo dropping gear (carriages). The boats were also armored, having bulletproof sides and deck. Their maximum speed amounted of 18 knots. However, by 1916, their spar torpedoes were removed, leaving only the two midships torpedoes in the dropping carriages.

Opposing the Romanian vessels were four Soviet armored motor gunboats of the BKA type, Project-1125-class. These armored boats were lighter than their Romanian counterparts, having a displacement of 30 tons. However, they were more heavily armed, carrying one 76 mm gun in a tank turret and several machine guns.

== Engagement ==
The action took place in the early hours of 26 June, near Ceatalchioi. The Romanian motor launches V-1 and V-3, part of the Tulcea Tactical Group (along with the other two boats and two Romanian monitors) were involved in a successful Romanian landing operation on 24 June, providing artillery support for the ground troops as they occupied the Soviet observation post of Ceatalchioi. On the night of 25–26 June, three Soviet armored motor gunboats infiltrated in Romanian waters in order to install a barrage of mines. The action commenced at 01:20 am on 26 June, when the commander of V-3 spotted the three Soviet boats, which were advancing in a line. The Romanian commander fired his 47 mm gun at the Soviet boat that was in the middle of the line, the second shell swiftly igniting a fire aboard the Soviet vessel. The other two Soviet boats, with their mines aboard, retreated without returning fire. While retreating with full speed, the two Soviet boats briefly rammed into each other, but soon resumed course. One of the two boats then hit a rock in the water, causing her to jump up in the air with her engines roaring. V-3 fired seven more shells at the two retreating boats, while V-1 also opened fire. The damaged Soviet boat was ultimately captured by the Romanians. She was subsequently repaired and commissioned by the Romanian Navy as V-7.
