= Ceatalchioi =

- Commune
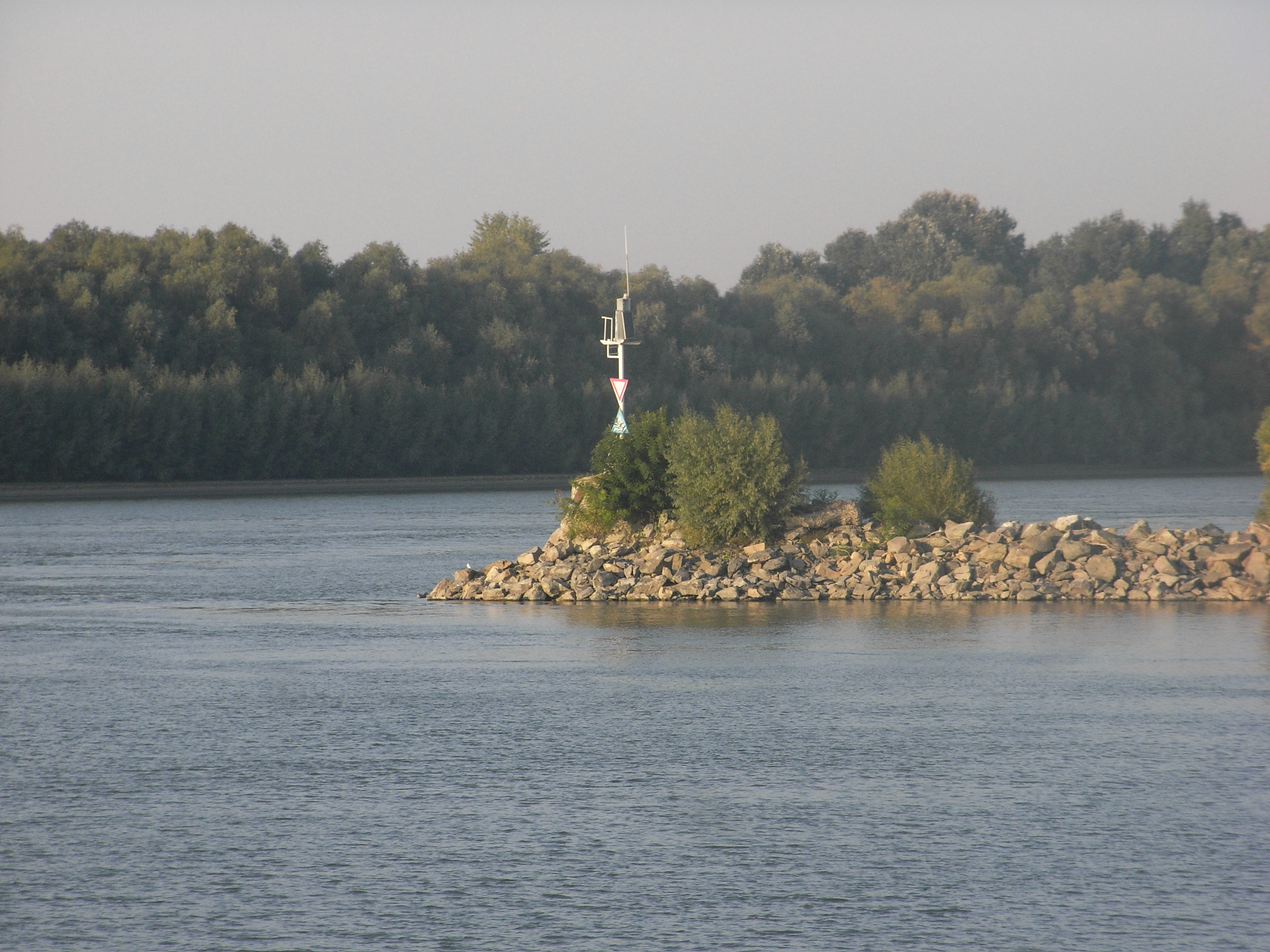

- Flag

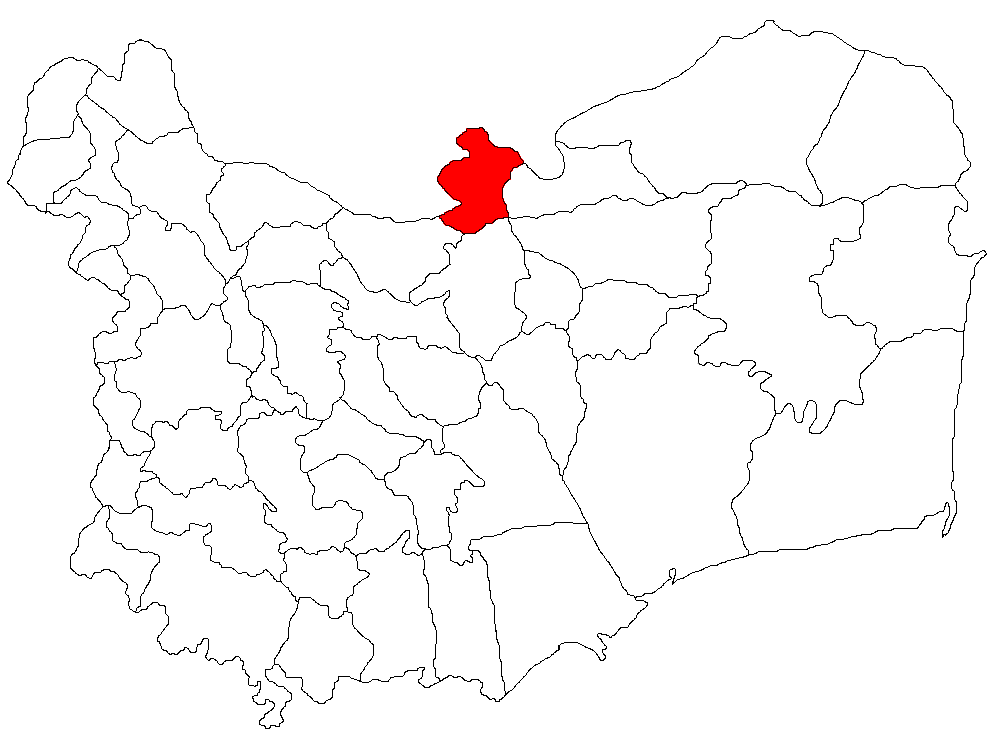
- Location in Tulcea County

- Location in Romania
- Coordinates: 45°17′N 28°47′E
- Country: Romania
- County: Tulcea
- Subdivisions: Ceatalchioi, Pătlăgeanca, Plauru, Sălceni

Government
  - Mayor (2024–2028): Tudor Cernega (PSD)
- Area: 80.47 km^{2} (31.07 sq mi)
- Elevation: 2 m (6.6 ft)
- Population (2021-12-01): 531
  - Density: 6.60/km^{2} (17.1/sq mi)
- Time zone: UTC+02:00 (EET)
  - Summer (DST): UTC+03:00 (EEST)
- Postal code: 827040
- Area code: +(40) x40
- Vehicle reg.: TL
- Website: www.comunaceatalchioi.ro

Ceatalchioi (Romanian pronunciation: [t͡ʃe̯atalˈkjoj]) is a commune in Tulcea County, Northern Dobruja, Romania. It is composed of four villages: Ceatalchioi (Turkish: Çatalköy), Pătlăgeanca (historical name: Principesa Ileana), Plauru (historical name: Lascăr Catargiu), and Sălceni.

== Location ==
The commune is located in the northern part of Tulcea County, 15 km (9.3 mi) north of the county seat, Tulcea. It lies in the Danube Delta, on the right bank of the Chilia branch of the Danube, which marks the Romania–Ukraine border. Across from the village of Plauru is the city of Izmail, on the Ukrainian side of the border.

== Spillovers during the Russo-Ukrainian war ==
Ceatalchioi and the villages composing the commune proper was the subject of various spillovers of the Russo-Ukrainian war given the proximity to the internal Ukrainian port of Izmail, which together with Reni and Kiliya, all situated on the Danube and the border with Romania, came under heavy Russian attack as the war escalated in 2022.

=== First incident ===
On September 3, 2023, during an attack on the port of Izmail conducted by the Russian Air Force, multiple Shahed-136 drones of Iranian production strayed from the initial target zones and crashed on the Romanian bank of the Danube somewhere between Plauru and Ceatalchioi, but as the zone is uninhabited it largely went unnoticed and it wasn't until the State Border Guard Service of Ukraine published a video the following day clearly showing explosions in Romania that the government of the neighbouring country commenced a search party, after initially denying such an event taking place. Drone fragments were finally found on September 5, confirming that Romania's airspace has been violated by Russia. In a phone conversation with the Secretary General of NATO Jens Stoltenberg, President of Romania Klaus Iohannis, who initially denied the incident, reassured that, nonetheless, "Romania has the full support of NATO".

Given Romania's membership in NATO, the incident could had been masked in order not to produce panic or an escalation. However, due to the incident being the first major one, some Romanian citizens and politicians were outraged by the mistreat of the incident by the authorities, president and cabinet. A journalist later wrote about the incident as panicking given the response of the authorities. After the incident, a press team went to Plauru and interviewed its residents, which stated several times that they saw Russian drones over the village in the last month without receiving a proper response from the Romanian authorities as they announced the violations.

=== Other incidents ===
Parts of a second drone were found the next week, in the immediate vicinity of the village of Plauru, and the third on September 13, in the area of the village of Victoria, part of the commune of Nufăru and 15 km deep in Romanian territory. The latter spread over several tens of meters, confirming that multiple drones were detonated on Romanian soil.

The Ukrainian Air Force recorded that the Russia launched several groups of attack UAVs from the area of the Chauda training ground (occupied Crimea) and Primorsko-Akhtarsk (Russian Federation). Journalists on the site began questioning locals, who stated that they often saw Russian drones flying over their houses, giving clues that it may not have been the first time that Russia violated Romanian airspace.

Similar incidents already took place in Moldova, Poland, and Belarus, countries not involved directly in the conflict. Romania became the second NATO country to be affected, after Poland. Coincidentally, Poland and Romania were the countries to be the most threatened by Russian politicians, because of their proximity and NATO membership.

On July 25, 2024, three Shahed drones launched by Russia strayed into Romania's airspace; debris from one of the Geran-2 drones were subsequently found in Plauru by the Romanian authorities.

=== November 2025 evacuation ===
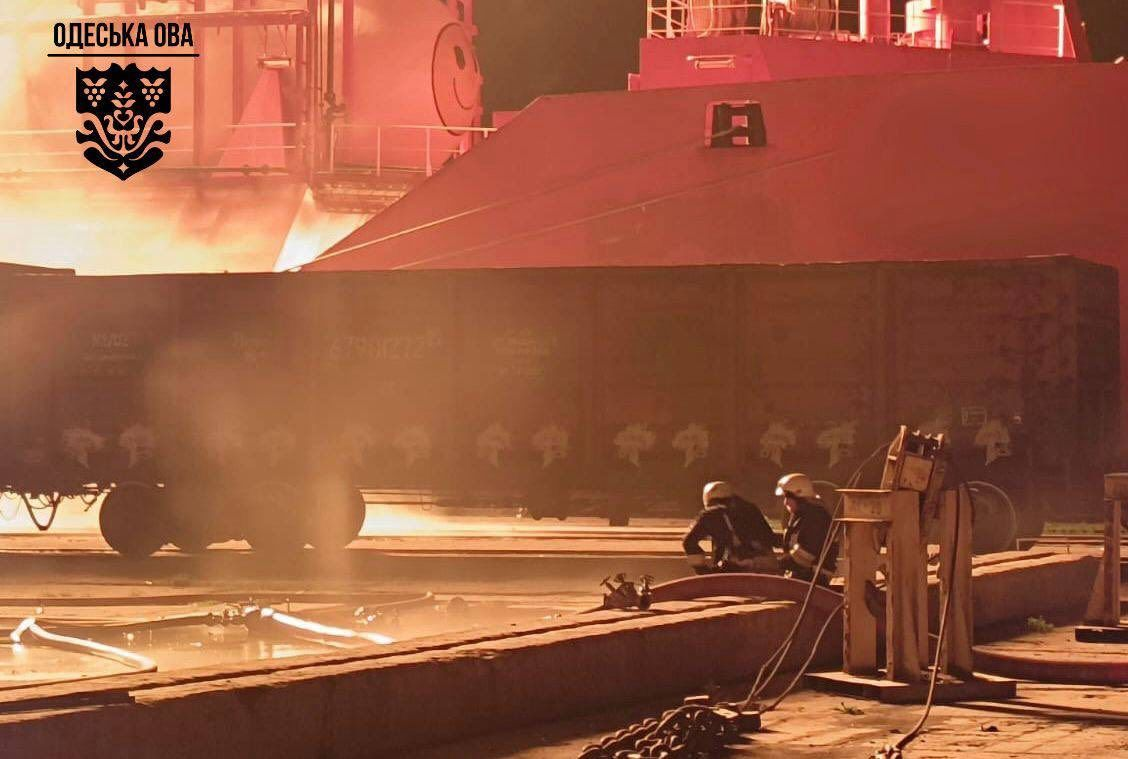
MT Orinda burning in the Port of Izmail

On November 17, 2025, the villages of Ceatalchioi and Plauru were evacuated by the Romanian Government, as a safety measure after a Russian drone struck Orinda, a LPG gas tanker under the Turkish flag that was sailing along the Danube river, close to the port city of Izmail and 500 metres away from the village.

According to the Romanian Government, the fire "presents an explosion risk", and the mayor of the commune, Tudor Cernega, announced that debris from smaller explosions related to the fire were already found on the Romanian bank of the Danube. The evacuation procedures were hampered by the fact that elderly citizens opposed the evacuation, the mayor considering a forced evacuation. The majority of the citizens self-evacuated.

In total, 246 citizens left the two villages, 180 of their own free will and 66 (51 in Ceatalchioi and 15 in Plauru) after the intervention of authorities. At least one person sought medical assistance amid the evacuation. The following day, the residents of Ceatalchioi were able to return to their homes as the ship fire was believed to be under control.

Experts estimated that, in case of explosion, the affected area may have a range as big as 5 kilometres.

== See also ==
- Violations of non-combatant airspaces during the Russian invasion of Ukraine
- 2022 Zagreb Tu-141 crash – Military drone crash in Zagreb, Croatia
- 2022 missile explosion in Poland – 2022 explosions in Poland
- 2023 Black Sea drone incident – Russian–US military interaction
- Action of 26 June 1941
