= MT Orinda =

LPG tanker

History
- Name: Norgas Orinda (2002–2019); Coral Orinda (2019–2023); Orinda (2023–present)
- Namesake: Orinda, California
- Owner: Somargas Ltd. (2002–2009); Somargas II Pte. Ltd. (2009–2013); Orinda Shipping Company Pte. Ltd. (2013–2023); Orinda Denizcilik Anonim Şirketi (2023–present)
- Operator: Norwegian Gas Carriers AS (2002–2018); I.M. Skaugen Marine Services Pte. Ltd. (2013–2018); Bernhard Schulte Shipmanagement (2018–2019); Anthony Veder Rederijzaken B.V. (2019–2023); BMA Gemi İşletmeciliği Ltd. Şti. (2023–present)
- Port of registry: Hong Kong (2002–2011); Singapore (2011-2023); Turkey, Istanbul (2023–present)
- Ordered: 16 June 2000
- Builder: Hudong-Zhonghua Shipbuilding (Shanghai, China)
- Cost: US$20.8 million (2000)
- Yard number: 429
- Laid down: 11 June 2001
- Launched: 22 September 2001
- Completed: 10 October 2002
- In service: 2002–present
- Identification: IMO number: 9240122; MMSI number: 271051161 (2023–present); Call sign: VRXY8 (2002–2011); Call sign: 9V8456 (2011–2023); Call sign: TCA7413 (2023–present)
- Status: In active service

General characteristics
- Type: LEG/LPG carrier
- Tonnage: 8,720 GT; 2,617 NT; 9,352 DWT
- Displacement: 14,300 t (14,100 long tons)
- Length: LOA: 124.9 m (409 ft 9 in); LBP: 115 m (377 ft 4 in)
- Beam: 19.8 m (65 ft)
- Draught: Design: 6.7 metres (22 ft); Scantling: 8.3 metres (27 ft 3 in)
- Depth: 11.5 metres (37 ft 9 in)
- Ice class: ICE-1C
- Installed power: MAN-B&W 6L48/60; 6,300 kW (8,400 hp)
- Propulsion: Single shaft; controllable-pitch propeller; gearbox
- Speed: 85% MCR: 16.7 knots (30.9 km/h; 19.2 mph)
- Capacity: Cargo: 8,550 m^{3} (302,000 cu ft); FO: 1,200 m^{3} (42,000 cu ft); DO: 200 m^{3} (7,100 cu ft); WB: 5,000 m^{3} (180,000 cu ft)
- Complement: Officers: 6; Crew: 6 (+6 spare)
- Crew: 16

MT Orinda is a semi-refrigerated LPG tanker built in 2002 by Hudong-Zhonghua Shipbuilding in Shanghai, China. Originally delivered as MT Norgas Orinda, the vessel was renamed MT Coral Orinda in 2019 before entering service as Orinda under Turkish ownership in 2023.

The ship is most widely known for the fire on 17 November 2025, when she was struck by a Russian drone while unloading gas in the Port of Izmail, Ukraine, causing a large blaze and the evacuation of nearby villages across the Danube river in Romania.

== Technical description ==
Orinda is a semi-refrigerated liquefied gas carrier built by Hudong-Zhonghua Shipbuilding (hull no. 429) to a design by Carl Bro A/S – Dwinger Marineconsult, Denmark. The ship has an overall length of 124.9 metres (409 ft 9 in), a beam of 19.8 metres (65 ft 0 in), and a moulded depth of 11.5 metres (37 ft 9 in). Her design draught is 6.7 metres (22 ft 0 in), with a scantling draught of 8.3 metres (27 ft 3 in). As built, the vessel measured 8,720 gross tonnage (GT), with a lightweight of 4,900 t and 9,400 tons deadweight (DWT) at scantling draught.

The vessel belongs to a class of "super-cooler" gas carriers developed for I.M. Skaugen / Norgas to reduce port turnaround times through higher tank pressures and increased cooling capacity. The cargo plant, supplied by Tractebel Gas Engineering, allows an IMO tank pressure of 7 bars (700 kPa) and a cooling rate of approximately 2 °C (36 °F) per day in tropical waters. This enables rapid loading of ambient propylene and significantly shorter cooling cycles compared with conventional semi-refrigerated gas carriers.

Orinda has a double-skin hull with side ballast tanks and is fitted with two independent Type C cargo tanks of 5,322 m^{3} (187,900 cu ft) and 3,139 m^{3} (110,900 cu ft), giving a total cargo volume of 8,550 m^{3} (302,000 cu ft). Both tanks are cylindrical with spherical ends, offering about 30% less surface area than bi-lobe designs. A 90 m^{3} (3,200 cu ft) deck tank is provided for coolant, together with a vaporising system for rapid gassing-up. The cargo system is designed for products with temperatures as low as −104 °C (−155 °F), densities up to 972 kg/m^{3} (1,638 lb/cu yd), and vapour pressures up to 7 bar. A nitrogen generator enables full cargo-grade changes at sea, and discharge of LPG is supported by a thermal-oil heating system without the need for seawater.

Propulsion is provided by a single MAN B&W 6L48/60 diesel engine rated at 6,300 kW (MCR), driving a controllable-pitch propeller via a gearbox fitted with a 1,700 kW (2,300 hp) power take-off alternator. The gearbox also supports power-take-in operation, allowing emergency propulsion using power from the auxiliary engines. Electrical power is supplied by the PTO alternator and four 550 kW (740 hp) diesel generators. Service speed is 16.7 knots at 85% MCR, with a typical fuel consumption of 23.6 t/day for the main engine and 2.3 t/day for auxiliaries.

Manoeuvrability is improved through an Ulstein high-efficiency flap rudder and a 700 kW Brunvoll bow thruster, enabling the vessel to turn in its own length and move laterally during port operations. Cargo handling is served by two stainless-steel centrifugal pumps rated at 380 m^{3}/h (13,000 cu ft/h) and 640 m^{3}/h (23,000 cu ft/h), manufactured by Svanehøj.

Safety systems include a freefall lifeboat, Unitor dry-chemical firefighting equipment on deck, CO₂ flooding in the engine room, and water-deluge protection for accommodation and hazardous areas. The ship carries six officers and six crew, plus space for six additional personnel.

== Service history ==
The ship was contracted with Hudong-Zhonghua Shipbuilding (Group) Co., Ltd. in Shanghai, China on 16 June 2000 for the contract price of US$20,800,000. She was laid down under hull number 429 on 11 June 2001 and launched on 21 September 2001. As of the 2001 financial report, US$4,160,000 had been paid in instalments with US$16,640,000 remaining, due in 2002. The vessel was delivered on 10 October 2002 as Norgas Orinda under the Hong Kong flag and Det Norske Veritas (DNV) classification, with call sign VRXY8.

Upon delivery, she was registered to Somargas Ltd., Hong Kong with Norwegian Gas Carriers AS of Oslo (I.M. Skaugen) serving as manager. In December 2009, the vessel was transferred to Somargas II Pte. Ltd., of Singapore while retaining her Hong Kong flag and VRXY8 call sign. In March 2011, the ship was reflagged to Singapore and received the new call sign 9V8456. In April 2013, ownership was transferred to Orinda Shipping Company Pte. Ltd., Singapore, with management assigned to I.M. Skaugen Marine Services Pte. Ltd., Singapore alongside Norgas Carriers AS. In December 2018 Bernhard Schulte Shipmanagement joined I.M. Skaugen as co-manager.

In June 2019, Anthony Veder Group took over commercial management of the vessel from GATX Corporation as part of a transaction involving five gas carriers from the Norgas pool. On 12 July 2019, the ship was renamed Coral Orinda while remaining under Singapore flag and ownership of Orinda Shipping Company Pte. Ltd., with Anthony Veder Rederijzaken B.V., Rotterdam assuming the role of manager.

On 15 March 2023, an agreement was signed in London for the sale of the vessel to Orinda Denizcilik Anonym Şirketi, Istanbul, a subsidiary of Lokal Enerji. The ship was subsequently transferred from the Singapore ship registry to the Turkish registry and reflagged to Turkey with the new call sign TCA7413. She was renamed Orinda in late March 2023, with technical management assigned to BMA Gemi İşletmeciliği Ltd. Şti. and crewed by Turkish seafarers.

=== 2025 drone strike and fire ===
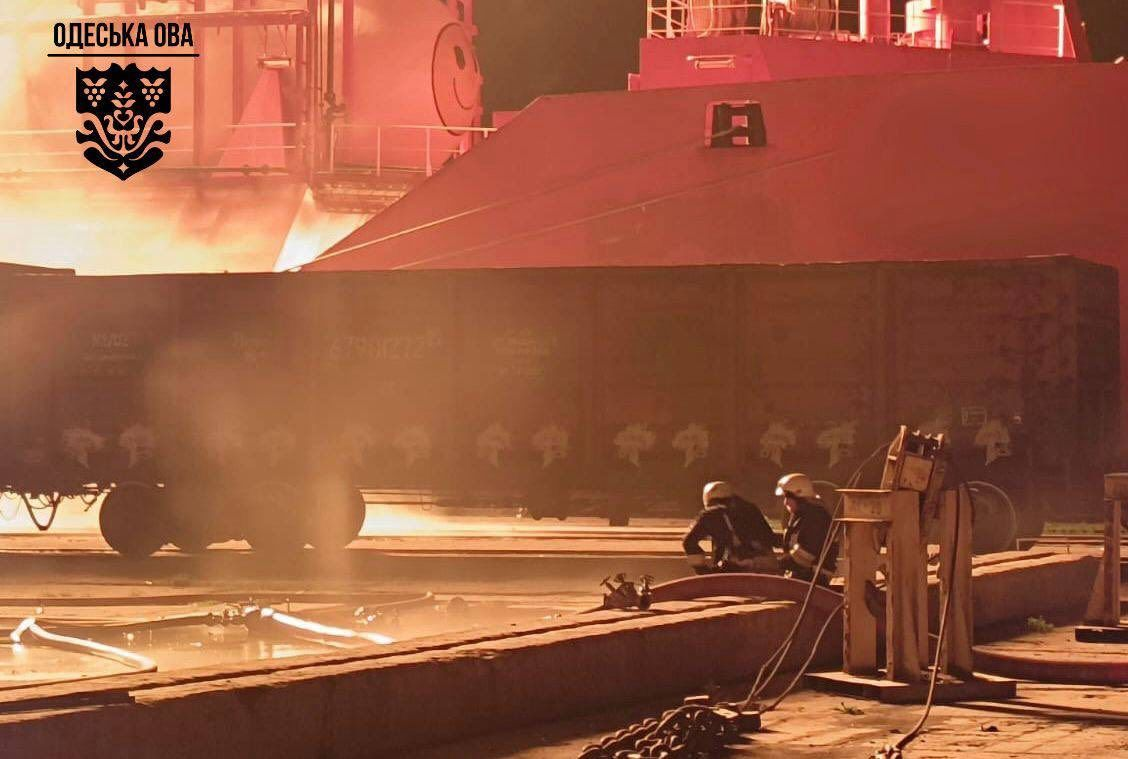
Orinda burning at the berth

On 17 November 2025, Orinda was struck by a Russian drone during a massive attack on the Port of Izmail, Ukraine. The vessel, which had been anchored at the port since 12 November and was in the process of offloading about 4,400 tonnes of liquefied petroleum gas, was hit at approximately 02:00 local time. The strike ignited gas transfer equipment aboard the vessel, causing a large-scale fire. According to Ukrainian Navy spokesman Dmytro Pletenchuk, the ship's captain had ignored warnings to leave the berth before the attack.

All 16 Turkish crew members evacuated the vessel safely with no injuries. Due to the vessel's proximity to Romanian territory—approximately 300 to 500 metres (980 to 1,640 ft) across the Danube—and the explosion risk posed by the burning cargo, Romanian authorities evacuated nearly 250 residents from the villages of Plauru and Ceatalchioi in Tulcea County. The fire was extinguished by Ukrainian emergency services by the morning of 18 November, and the vessel was subsequently moved under its own power to a safer anchorage on 20 November. Insurance and cargo surveyors boarded to conduct inspections, and discussions continued regarding offloading the remaining cargo.
