= Komyshivka, Odesa Oblast =

Village in Odesa Oblast, Ukraine

Komyshivka Комишівка Hagi-Curda
- Village
- Interactive map of Komyshivka
- Location of Komyshivka within Odesa Oblast#Location of Komyshivka within Ukraine Komyshivka (Ukraine)
- Coordinates: 45°30′53″N 29°07′11″E
- Country: Ukraine
- Oblast: Odesa Oblast
- Raion: Izmail Raion
- Hromada: Safiany rural hromada
- Elevation: 14 m (46 ft)

Population (2001)
  - Total: 3,491
- Time zone: UTC+2 (EET)
  - Summer (DST): UTC+3 (EEST)
- Postal code: 68653
- Area code: +380 4841

Komyshivka (Ukrainian: Комишівка; Romanian: Hagi-Curda) is a village in Izmail Raion, Odesa Oblast (province) of southwestern Ukraine. It belongs to Safiany rural hromada, one of the hromadas of Ukraine.

== Demographics ==
Native language as of the Ukrainian Census of 2001:

- Moldovan (Romanian) 94.53%
- Russian 3.41%
- Ukrainian 1.35%
- Bulgarian 0.54%
- Romanian (self-declared) 0.09%
- Gagauz 0.06%
