= Safiany rural hromada =

Coordinates: 45°25′33.7″N 28°54′23.9″E

Safiany rural hromada Саф'янівська сільська громада
- Hromada
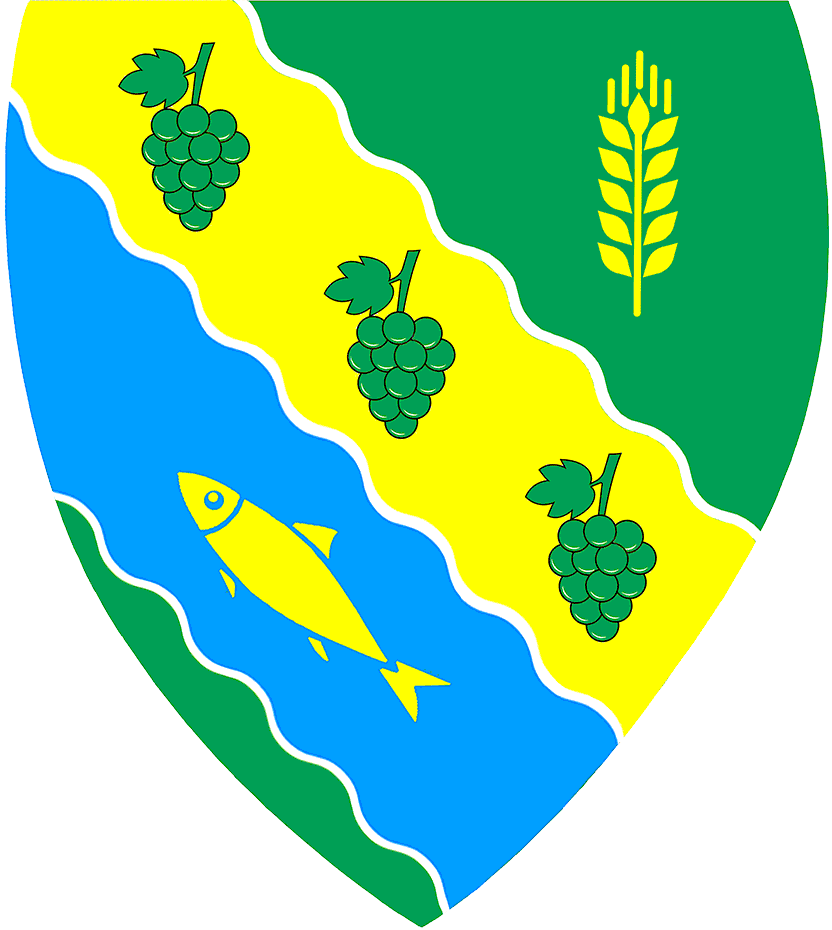
- Coat of arms

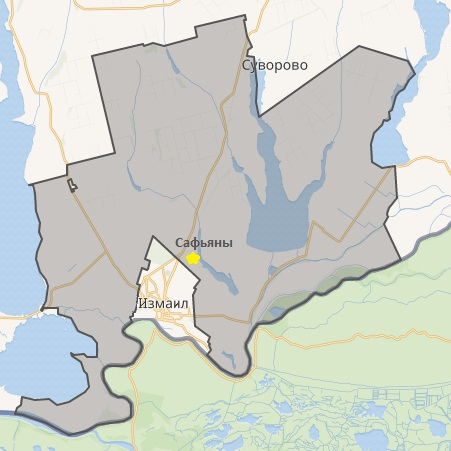
- Country: Ukraine
- Oblast: Odesa Oblast
- Raion: Izmail Raion
- Admin. center: Safiany

Area
  - Total: 915.4 km^{2} (353.4 sq mi)

Population (2021)
  - Total: 43,002
  - Density: 46.98/km^{2} (121.7/sq mi)
- CATOTTG code: UA51080090000065506
- Settlements: 19
- Villages: 19

Safiany settlement hromada (Ukrainian: Саф'янівська сільська громада) is a hromada in Izmail Raion of Odesa Oblast in southwestern Ukraine. Population: 43,002 (2021 est.)

The hromada consists of 19 villages:

- Bahate
- Broska
- Dunaiske
- Kalanchak
- Kamianka
- Kyslytsia
- Komyshivka
- Larzhanka
- Loshchynivka
- Matroska
- Muravlivka
- Nova Nekrasivka
- Novokalanchak
- Novokamianka
- Ozerne
- Pershotravneve
- Safiany
- Stara Nekrasivka
- Utkonosivka

The Safiany rural hromada had 41,179 inhabitants in 2001, out of which 13,878 spoke Ukrainian (33.70%), 8,267 spoke Romanian (20.08%), 10,589 spoke Russian (25.71%), 95 spoke Gagauz (0.23%), and 8,111 spoke Bulgarian (19.7%).

== Notable people ==
- Oleksiy Ivanovych Poroshenko - Ukrainian businessman and father of Petro Poroshenko, born in Safiany

== Links ==
- Саф'янівська територіальна громада на порталі «Децентралізація»
