= Port of Izmail =

Commercial seaport in Ukraine

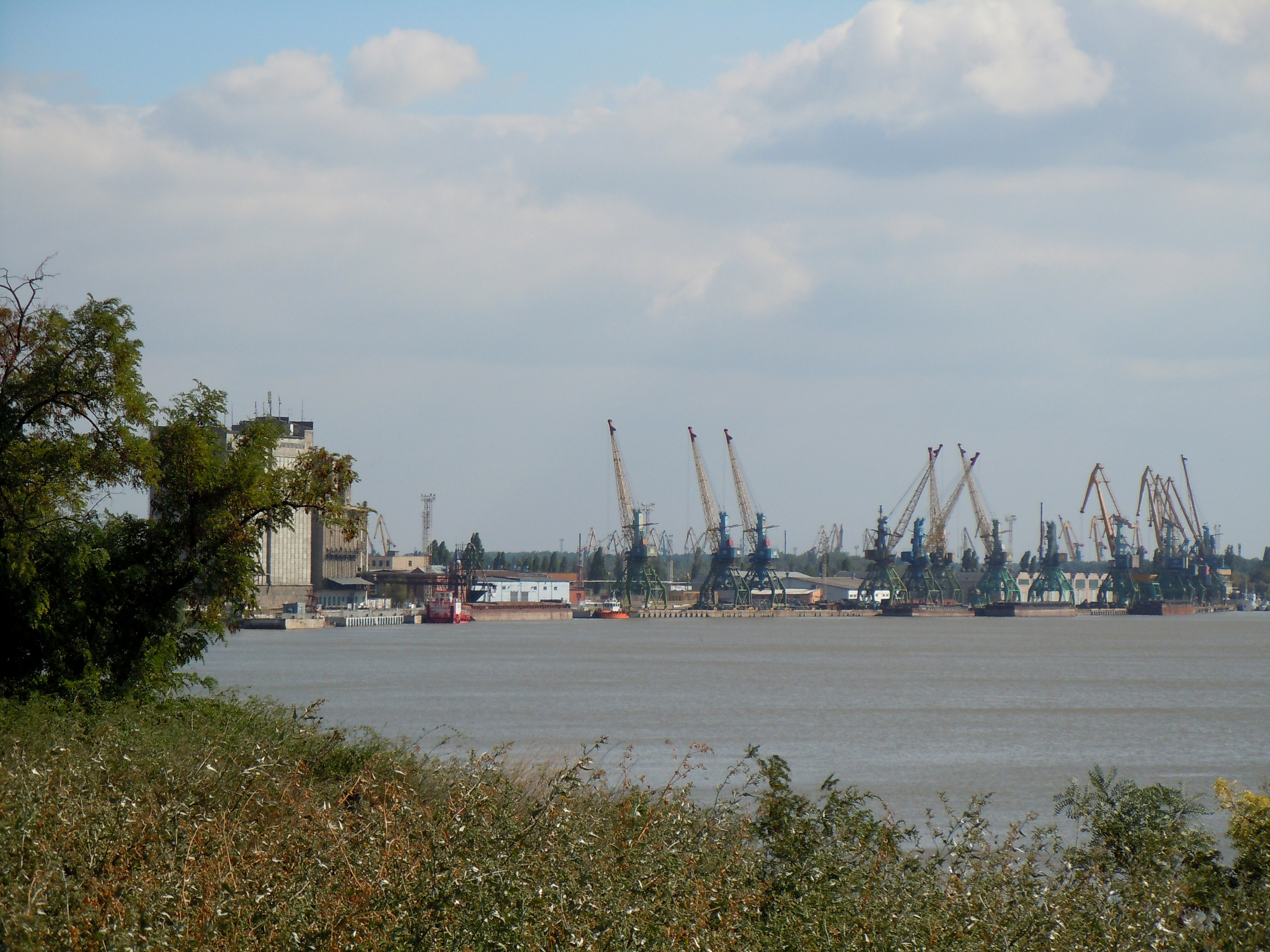
- Izmail sea trade port - view from the fortress, 2014.
- Interactive map of Port of Izmail
- Native name: Ізмаїльський морський порт

Location
- Country: Ukraine
- Location: Izmail, Izmail Raion, Odesa Oblast
- Coordinates: 45°20′20.8″N 28°47′50.5″E

Details
- Opened: 1813
- Size: 107.5 hectares
- Head of the seaport administration: Serhiy Ivanovych Laponoh

Statistics
- Website izmport.com.ua

The Izmail Sea Commercial Port (Ukrainian: Ізмаїльський морський торговельний порт, romanized: Izmailskyi morskyi torgovelnyi port), a state-owned enterprise of maritime transportation, is a multidisciplinary port located in the waters of the Kiliia River estuary of the Danube. It reports to the Ministry of Infrastructure (Ukraine). It is an important transport hub of Ukraine. According to the Law of Ukraine "On Seaports of Ukraine," the functions of the seaport administration are performed by the Izmail branch of the state enterprise of the Ukrainian Sea Ports Authority (AMPU). The number of employees at Port of Izmail as of 2009 was 2,520 people.

== Gallery ==
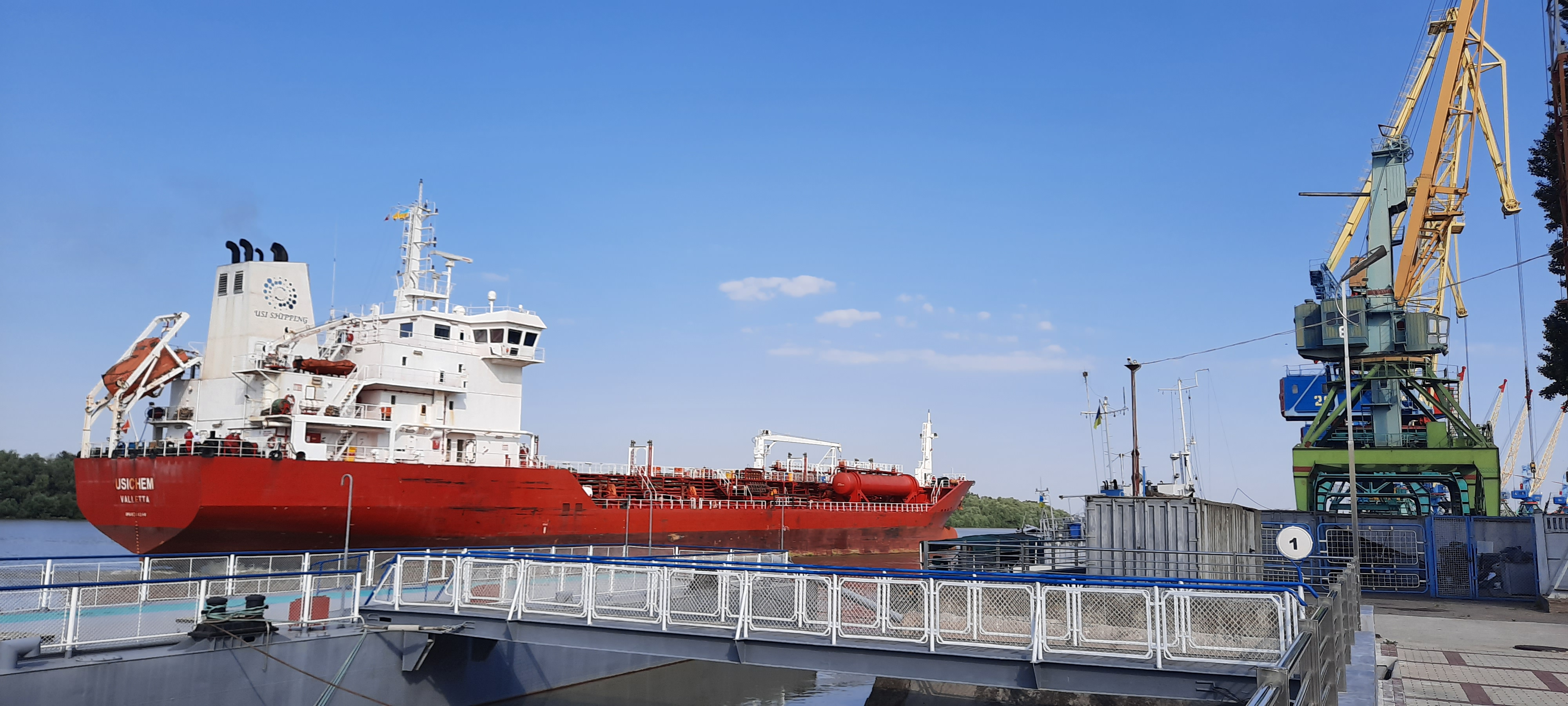
Usichem tanker, Izmail Seaport, June, 2020.

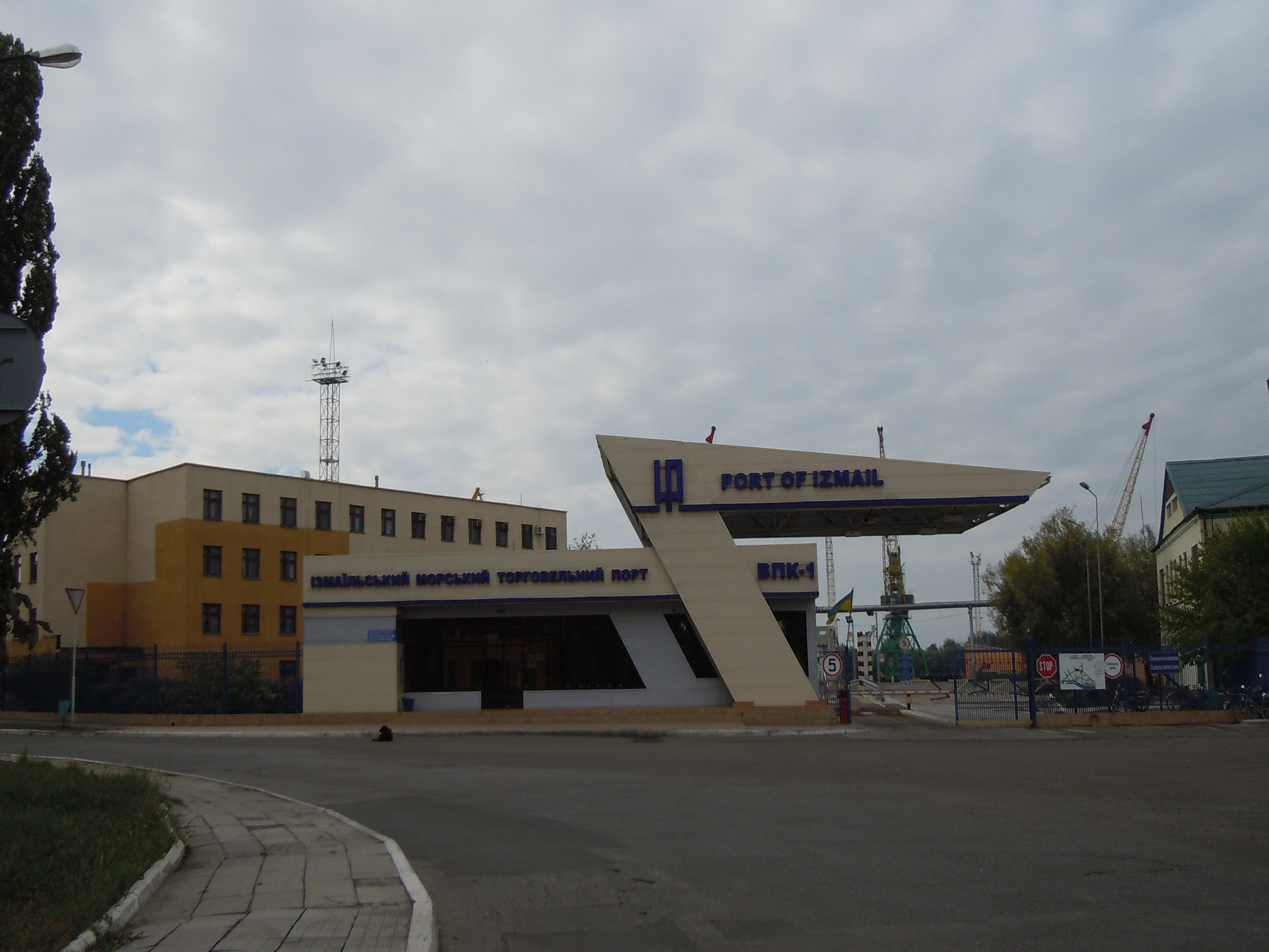
Port of Izmail main entrance, September, 2014.

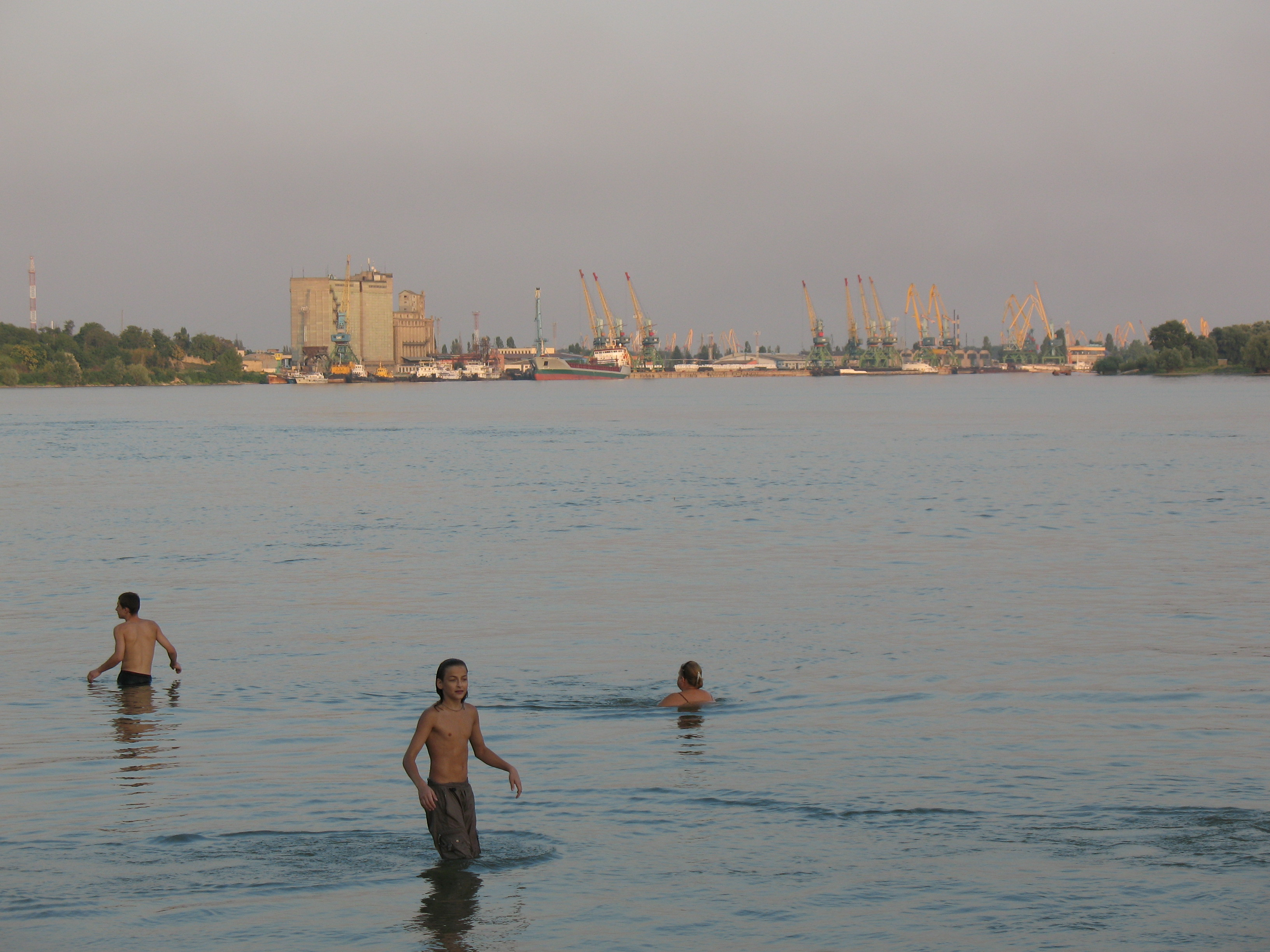
Port of Izmail, panorama, August, 2008.

== See also ==
- List of ports in Ukraine
- Transport in Ukraine
