= 2026 Leipzig Airport drone attack =

2026 drone incident in Germany

2026 Leipzig airport drone incidents
- Part of Russian sabotage operations in Europe
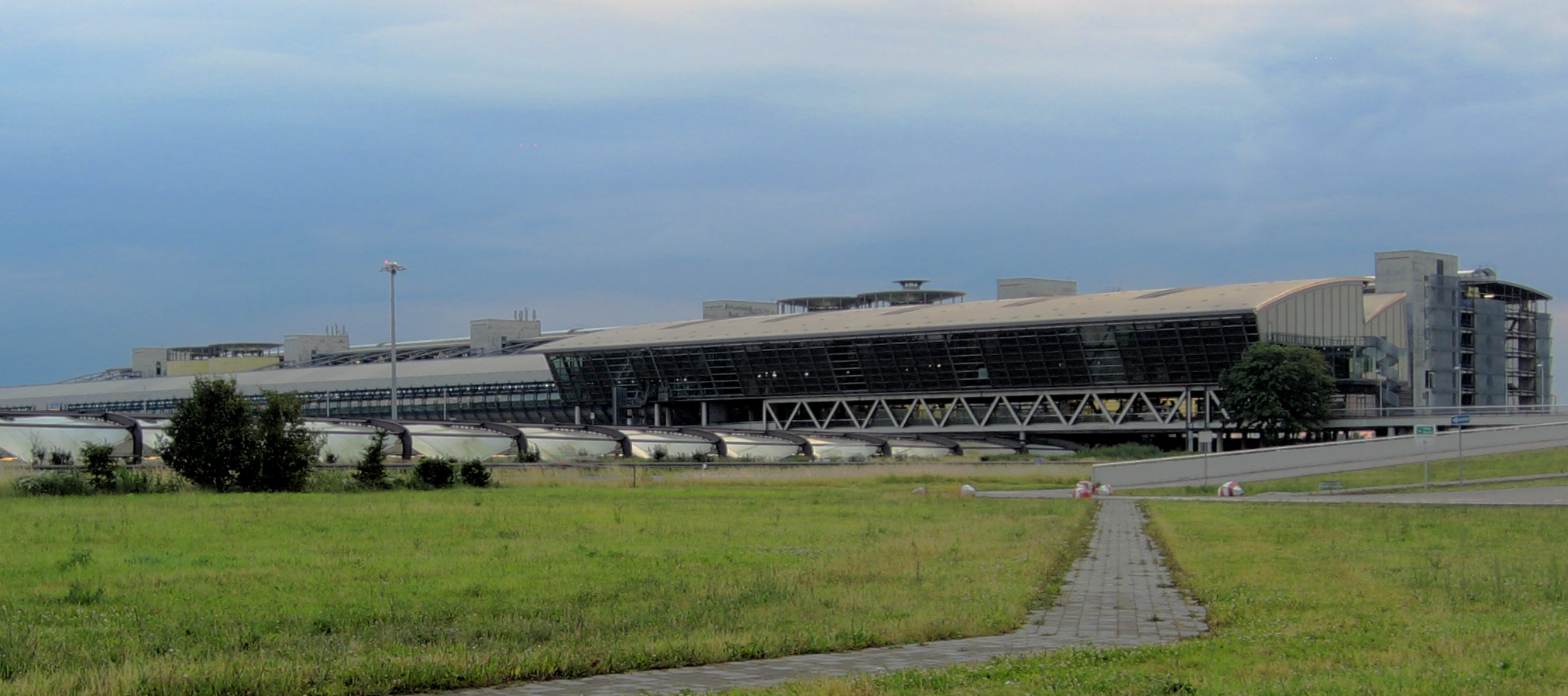
- Check-in at Leipzig airport
- Date: August 4–5, 2026
- Location: In and around Leipzig/Halle Airport, Saxony, Germany
- Type: Attempted attack with unmanned aerial vehicles, mid-air collision
- Cause: Under investigation
- Motive: Attempted sabotage of NATO strategic airlift operations by Russia
- Perpetrators: Russia (result of German Investigation) ↳ GRU (result of Insider & Der Spiegel Investigation)
- Outcome: Airport shutdown; Mid-air collision between a Boeing 757 and one of the drones

Between the last hours of 4 August 2026 and the early hours of 5 August 2026, two incidents involving unmanned aerial vehicles (UAVs) occurred at Leipzig/Halle Airport, Saxony, Germany. The first incident involved a drone carrying explosives, which was found on airport grounds near a Ukrainian cargo aircraft; this prompted the closure of the airport for the following hours. The second incident occurred as a Boeing 757 went around, due to the closure of the airport, after a landing attempt and collided with a second drone. German Federal Minister of the Interior, Alexander Dobrindt, stated that the attack was carried out by professionals, probably on behalf of foreign powers as part of a hybrid war scenario. On 1 September 2026, Germany formally blamed Russia for the hybrid-attack and announced the closure of the Russian House in Berlin and Russian Consulate in Bonn.

== Leipzig airport ==
Leipzig/Halle Airport is used by NATO for its Strategic Airlift International Solution mission, that aims to deliver armaments, ammunitions, weapons and other military equipment to the easternmost countries of the alliance and to Ukraine, through flights operated by Ukrainian cargo companies. This made the facility a sensitive target for potential Russian sabotage.

== Previous incidents ==
During 2025 and 2026 multiple drone incidents, often linked to the ongoing Russo-Ukrainian war occurred in Central and Eastern Europe. Drone sightings often occurred near airports or military facilities.

== First incident ==
UR-82072, the most likely An-124 involved in the drone target, pictured here at Gdańsk in 2022

The first incident occurred inside the airport grounds as a quadcopter FPV drone roughly the size of a microwave oven, carrying 800 grams of pentaerythritol tetranitrate explosive, was found near a Ukrainian cargo aircraft. The aircraft was reported to be an Antonov An-124 that had come from France with a cargo of ammunitions that was subsequently transferred to another flight headed to eastern Europe, so the aircraft was empty at the time of the incident.

It was initially reported that the drone was kicked down by an airport bus driver, but video of the incident showed the drone to fly directly toward the Antonov aircraft at 7:30PM and strike the wing, leaving a mark there. The drone did not detonate and fell to the ground, where it was discovered. The drone struck the An-124 in the wing near the fuel tank, failing to detonate. It then bounced off and landed on the ground. The explosive was lying a few meters away from the drone's body. The drone’s explosive was Semtex. An airport bus driver noticed the drone some four hours later.

Authorities deployed a bomb disposal robot that removed the drone and destroyed it in a controlled detonation in a secure location. It is also believed, after analysing footage from security cameras, that the drone had been flying over the airport since at least 7:28 pm local time. The drone was reportedly equipped with a SIM card, that made it possible to control it from very far away, and also made the UAV indistinguishable from normal cellphones to the anti-drone defense system.

After the incident the airport was completely closed, with all take offs halted and incoming flights diverted. The hub started to reopen about two hours after the incident, although the southern runway remained closed for longer.

== Second incident ==
European Air Transport Leipzig Flight 9LE
- D-ALEU, the aircraft involved in the accident, pictured in 2023

Incident
- Date: 5 August 2026
- Summary: Mid-air collision with an unmanned aerial vehicle, under investigation.
- Site: near Leipzig/Halle Airport, Saxony, Germany

Aircraft
- Aircraft type: Boeing 757-23N (SF)
- Operator: European Air Transport Leipzig, for DHL Aviation
- IATA flight No.: QY9LE
- Registration: D-ALEU
- Flight origin: Marseille Provence Airport, Provence-Alpes-Côte d'Azur, France
- Destination: Leipzig/Halle Airport, Saxony, Germany
- Occupants: ?
- Fatalities: 0
- Injuries: 0

The second incident occurred after the airport closure when a cargo Boeing 757-23N (SF), operating as European Air Transport Leipzig Flight 9LE, was forced to go around during approach due to the closure of the airport. The airplane, coming from Marseille Provence Airport, France, struck an unidentified object at an altitude of around 400 meters, as it was climbing again to abort its landing procedure. The crew issued a mayday, climbed to an altitude of 10,000 feet and diverted to Hannover Airport, about 200 km to the northwest, where a safe emergency landing was made. Upon landing an inspection revealed minor damage to the airplane's nose, in the area where apparently the impact with the drone occurred. Unconfirmed reports state that this second drone was carrying a camera to record the attack that was supposed to be carried out by the first one. The remains of the UAV that collided with Flight 9LE have not yet been found and German authorities are still conducting an official search for them.

== Aftermath ==
=== Other sightings ===
Just two days after the incident, at around 10:00 CEST on 7 August, two drones were spotted over the Mechernich military base in North Rhine-Westphalia. The sighting was confirmed by German authorities and was seen as part of a continuous pressure exercised by Russia over Germany as part of a hybrid warfare method.

== Reactions and investigation ==
=== Germany ===
The Federal Minister of the Interior, Alexander Dobrindt, stated that the attempted attack sets off a new level of danger, since none of the previous drone incidents over NATO countries involved an attempted attack with explosives, as in this incident. German authorities conducting the investigation believed that the attack was carried out by professionals, either directly or indirectly receiving orders from foreign powers. This suspicion was later confirmed by German parliamentary intelligence member Roderich Kiesewetter and US officials, who directly accused Russia of orchestrating the attack to sabotage arms shipment to Ukraine and intimidate NATO countries. The attempted attack was described by security experts as a new level of escalation between Russia and Europe, as it would mark one of the first attempts by Russia to attack directly military supply lines inside of NATO territory. The incidents were described as an hybrid war scenario aimed at destabilizing Germany. After this incident, and other previous incidents, requests were made to improve Germany's anti-drone defense systems, like the one present at Leipzig Airport that failed to detect the threat.

On 8 August, the German National Security Council met online, under the coordination of chancellor Friedrich Merz, to discuss the incidents and discuss the countermeasures to take.

On 9 August, Dobrindt and Dorothee Bär announced a new research facility for drone security to be opened 18 August 2026 in Cochstedt in light of the 4 August incident. It has also been announced that 150 new agents will be hired by the national conjoined center for drone defense, and that four new bases for the center will be created in response to the incidents.

Investigators found DNA traces on the drone. 10 August reports suggested that the DNA match previously found samples in a 20 July 2024 arson attack at a DHL logistics center at Leipzig Airport, but 11 August reports suggested the reports were false and there was no DNA link, despite similarities in the two cases that were being examined. As of 10 August 2026 the DNA was not linked to any specific individual.

An antenna was found on a nearby tree; investigators believed this was used to amplify the control signal. The drone was a specially designed model, with no navigation lights, a 5G router and two sim cards which would have allowed the drone to be operated from anywhere in the world.

Local media reported an explosion happened close to the airport in the abandoned village of Kursdorf, about 10 minutes before the first drone hit the Antonov aircraft on 4 August 2026. Police were spotted searching the area. Traces of the explosion were found, and in the immediate vicinity was an antenna that may have been used as a relay station.

On 14 August, investigators found a third drone on a field west of the airport in Kabelsketal. The device carried 50 grams of RDX explosive.

=== United States ===
US officials alleged that the explosive drone belonged to a Russian intelligence service, and was carrying military grade explosives, according to a US defense officials familiar with US intelligence reports.

=== Russia ===
On 7 August, the Russian Embassy in Germany issued a statement denying responsibility for the drone incident.

== Findings and escalation ==
On 1 September 2026, German authorities formally accused Russia of responsibility for the drone attack. Interior Minister Alexander Dobrindt said Germany was "a daily target of hybrid attacks" and raised the country's threat level from "general" to "high". Germany subsequently ordered the closure of the Russian consulate in Bonn and the Russian House in Berlin, while tightening entry controls for Russian nationals.

The European Commission announced plans for additional sanctions, while NATO Secretary General Mark Rutte welcomed Germany's response. Several European leaders also expressed solidarity with Germany and condemned the alleged Russian attack. French President Emmanuel Macron, Polish Prime Minister Donald Tusk, Italian Prime Minister Giorgia Meloni, British Prime Minister Andy Burnham, and Swedish Prime Minister Ulf Kristersson voiced support for Germany. The governments of Czechia and Estonia also expressed solidarity with Germany and called for a coordinated European response. President of the European Commission Ursula von der Leyen said the European Union stood in "full solidarity" with Germany, while President of the European Council António Costa stressed the need for European unity in responding to Russian hybrid threats.

Russia denied responsibility, with ambassador Sergey Nechayev calling the accusations "unsubstantiated, absurd, and irrational" and warning of retaliatory measures. In response to Germany's decision to close the Russian House cultural center in Berlin, Russian Foreign Minister Sergey Lavrov said Russia would shut German Goethe-Institut cultural centers in Moscow, St. Petersburg and Yekaterinburg, describing the move as a reciprocal response.

A 8 October 2026 investigation by Der Spiegel and Insider found Russia's intelligence agency GRU orchestrated the attack with a network of intermediaries and recruited operatives.

== Suspects ==
Following the attempted attack, security authorities focused on several suspects with alleged ties to Russia. According to investigations by NDR, WDR, and SZ, the suspects are two men from Belarus and Lithuania who are also reportedly Russian passport holders.

On 2 October 2026, a Telegraph and Welt am Sonntag investigation named Oleg Levushkin, a Russian national associated with the GRU, as the mastermind of the attack. It was reported that Levushkin along with a "disposable agent", Andrei Karshakou, travelled to Germany for the attack. Levushkin had contact with Denis Smolyaninov, part of the GRU. The attack was linked to GRU Unit 29155 by German Intelligence.

Maksim Lapunov, a Belarusian national was also linked to the attack via ties to Karshakov. He had been connected to an earlier suspected arson attack in Poland.

Andrey Usachev, according to the Insider and Spiegel investigation, is a GRU intermediary and arms dealer who contacted Lyovushkin before the attack.

== See also ==
- Violations of non-combatant airspace during the Russo-Ukrainian war (2022–present)
- Øresund drone incident
- 2026 drone incidents in Romania
