= Siebeck =

Siebeck is a surname of German origin. People with this surname include:

- Frank Siebeck (born 1949), German athlete
- Mark Siebeck (born 1975), German volleyball player
- Wolfram Siebeck (1928–2016), German journalist, author and food critic

== See also ==
- Mohr Siebeck, a German academic book and journal publisher
