= Linear Pottery Well Altscherbitz =

Archaeological site in Germany

The Linear Pottery Well of Altscherbitz is a well from the Neolithic Linear Pottery Culture discovered in 2005. Altscherbitz is a locality of the town Schkeuditz in the district of Nordsachsen in Saxony, Germany. The well supplied several Neolithic settlements in the Altscherbitz area with water more than 7,000 years ago.

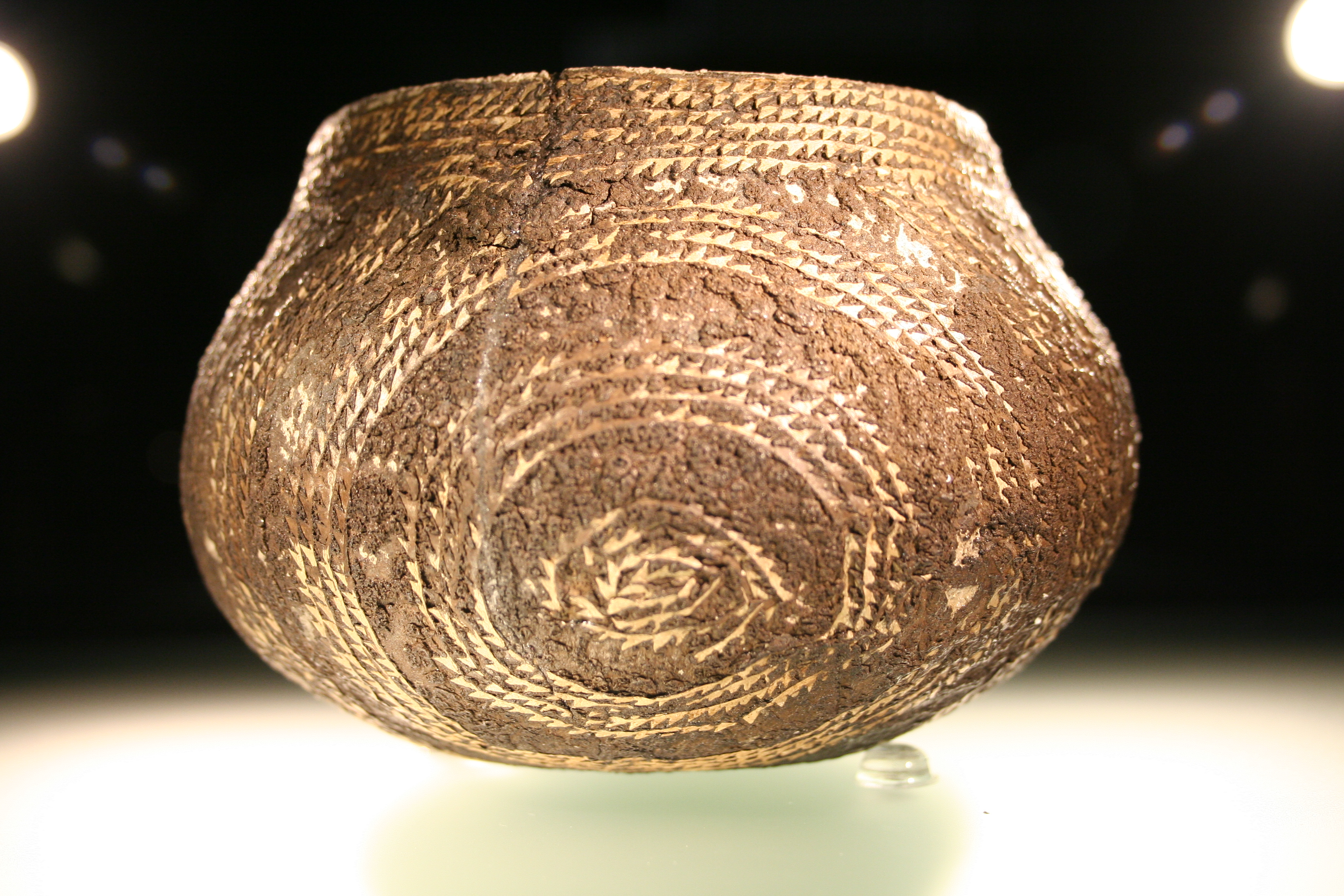
Round-bottomed jar from the well of Altscherbitz with glued inlays

It was located in soil 7 metres (23 ft) deep. The archaeological excavation took place in advance of the expansion of the Leipzig/Halle Airport. In order to enable a proper excavation, the well was recovered as a block about 4 metres (13 ft) tall and weighing about 70 tons using heavy machinery and brought to Dresden. There it was excavated under laboratory conditions in a hall of the State Office for Archaeology in Saxony from 2008 to 2010. Numerous unique finds are on display in the State Museum of Archaeology Chemnitz which opened in 2014. Wooden nails were used to connect the planks. These could be dated dendrochronologically based on the annual rings.

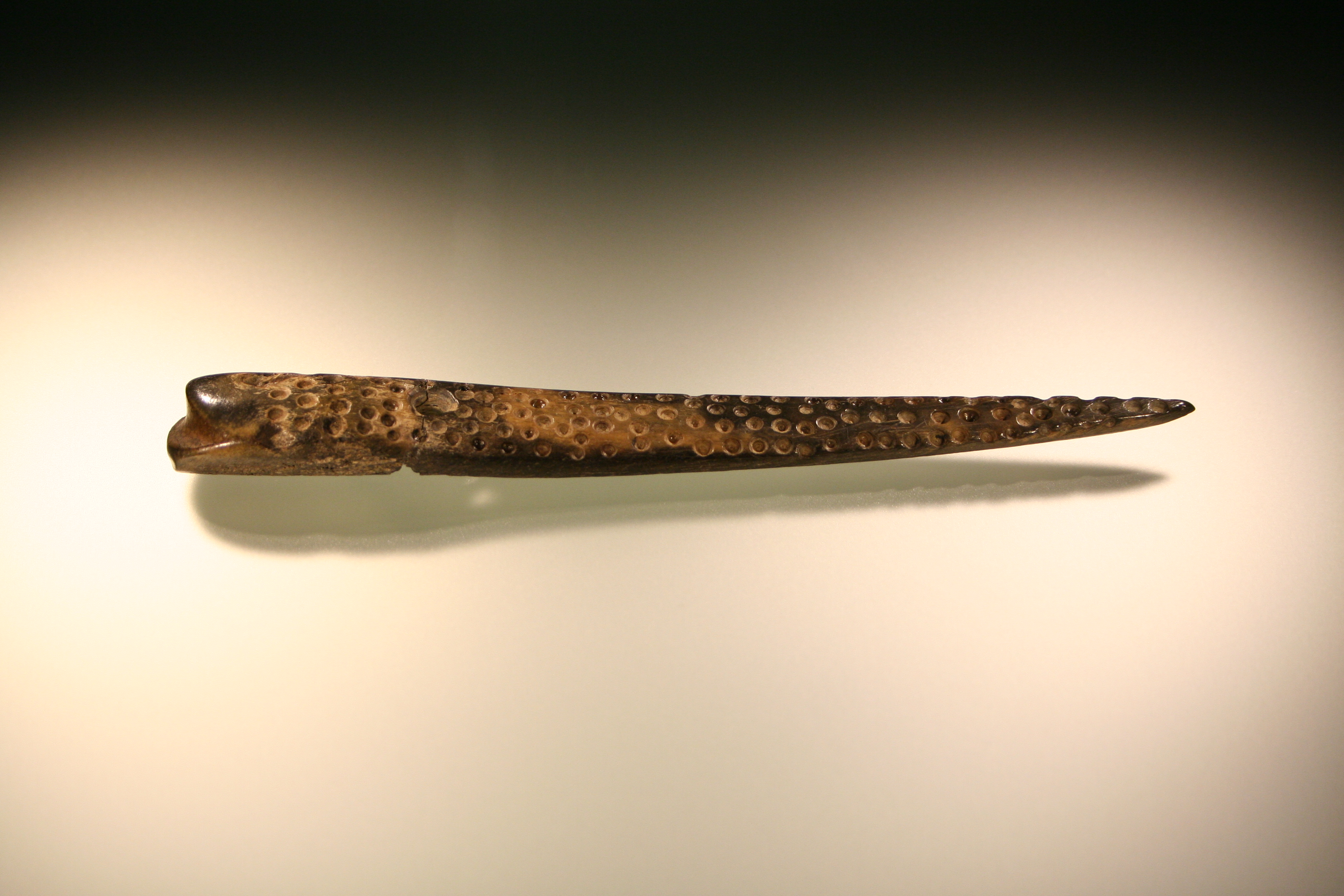
Decorated bone point from the Linear Pottery Well Altscherbitz
