= European Air Transport Leipzig =

German cargo airline

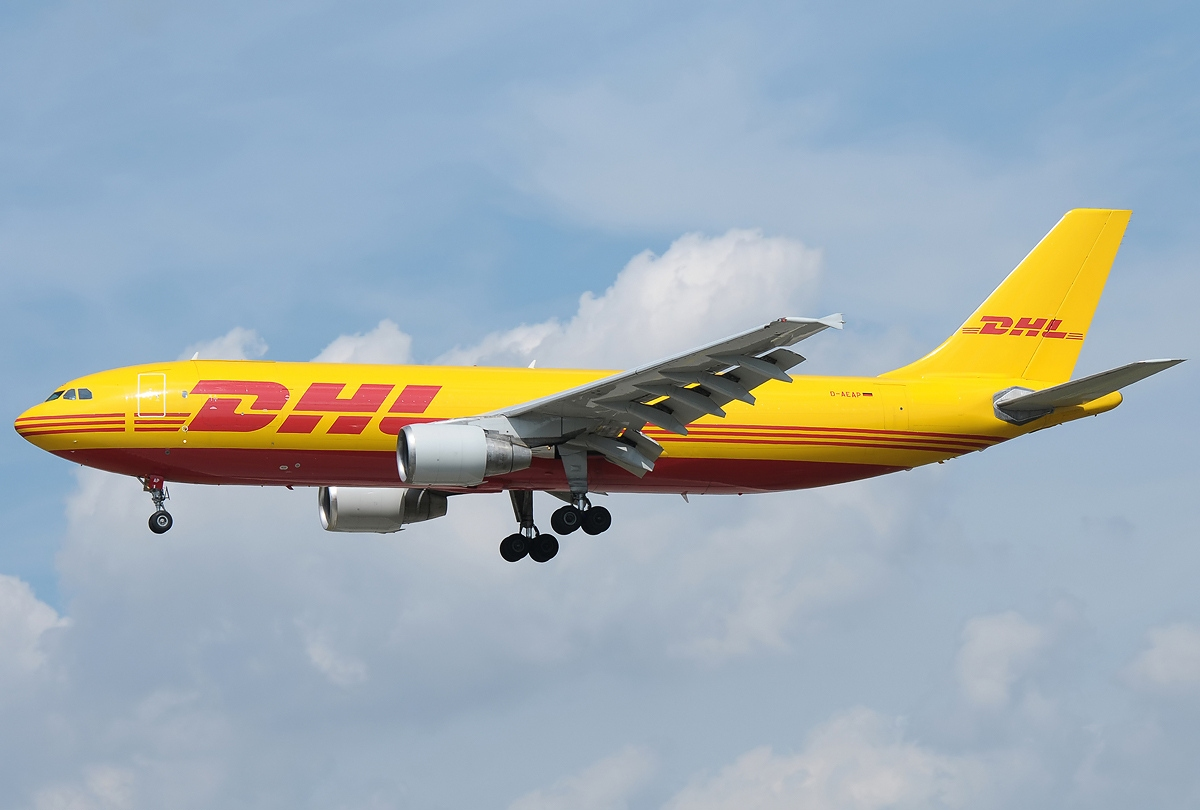
- An EAT Leipzig Airbus A300-600
IATA	ICAO	Call sign
QY	BCS	POSTMAN
- Founded: November 2005; 20 years ago (as a maintenance organisation)
- Commenced operations: 26 March 2010; 16 years ago
- Hubs: Brussels; Leipzig/Halle
- Fleet size: 35
- Destinations: 70+
- Parent company: DHL
- Headquarters: Schkeuditz, Saxony, Germany
- Key people: Markus Otto; Adam Pradela; Geoffrey Kehr
- Website: www.dhl.com

European Air Transport Leipzig GmbH – often shortened to EAT Leipzig or EAT-LEJ – is a German cargo airline with its head office and main hub on the grounds of Leipzig/Halle Airport in Schkeuditz, Saxony. It is wholly owned by Deutsche Post and operates the group's DHL-branded parcel post and express mail services. It also provides ad hoc charter services including livestock transport.

== Overview ==
The company dates from a merger agreement of 10 February 2010, which involved European Air Transport N.V. Brussels. That company was incorporated by the European Air Transport Leipzig GmbH and merged with it. European Air Transport Leipzig employs around 500 pilots and 750 ground and technical personnel. The airline is owned by DHL Express and the largest operator of the DHL European air network and with their A330 fleet, expanding into the intercontinental network. The airline also operates a number of routes for British Airways, Iberia, Finnair, Lufthansa and Amazon.

== Destinations ==
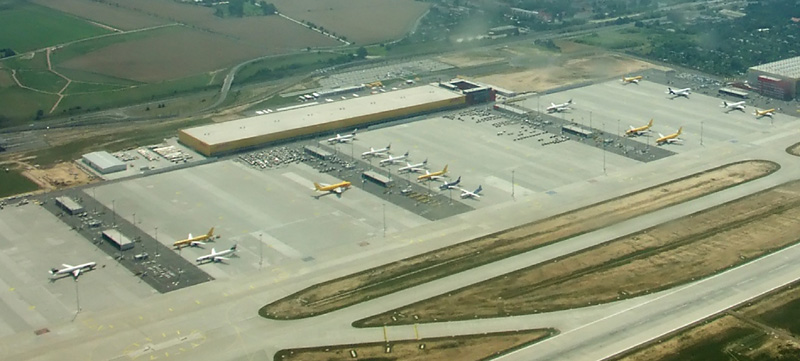
EAT Leipzig facilities at Leipzig/Halle Airport

European Air Transport operates services to Europe, Middle East, Africa, Asia and the United States as part of the DHL Aviation network. Besides over 75 smaller "air gateways", the major operational bases of DHL Aviation in Europe are:

Country	City	Airport	Notes
Belgium	Brussels	Brussels Airport	Hub
Czech Republic	Brno	Brno-Tuřany Airport	
Denmark	Copenhagen	Copenhagen Airport	
France	Paris	Charles de Gaulle Airport	
Germany	Frankfurt	Frankfurt Airport	
Germany	Leipzig	Leipzig/Halle Airport	Hub
Israel	Tel Aviv	David Ben Gurion Airport	
Italy	Milan	Milan Malpensa Airport	
Netherlands	Amsterdam	Amsterdam Airport Schiphol	
Portugal	Lisbon	Lisbon Airport	
Portugal	Porto	Porto Airport	
Spain	Madrid	Adolfo Suárez Madrid–Barajas Airport	
Spain	Vitoria-Gasteiz	Vitoria Airport	
Sweden	Örebro	Örebro Airport	
United Kingdom	East Midlands	East Midlands Airport	
United Kingdom	London	Heathrow Airport	
United Kingdom	London	Luton Airport	

== Fleet ==
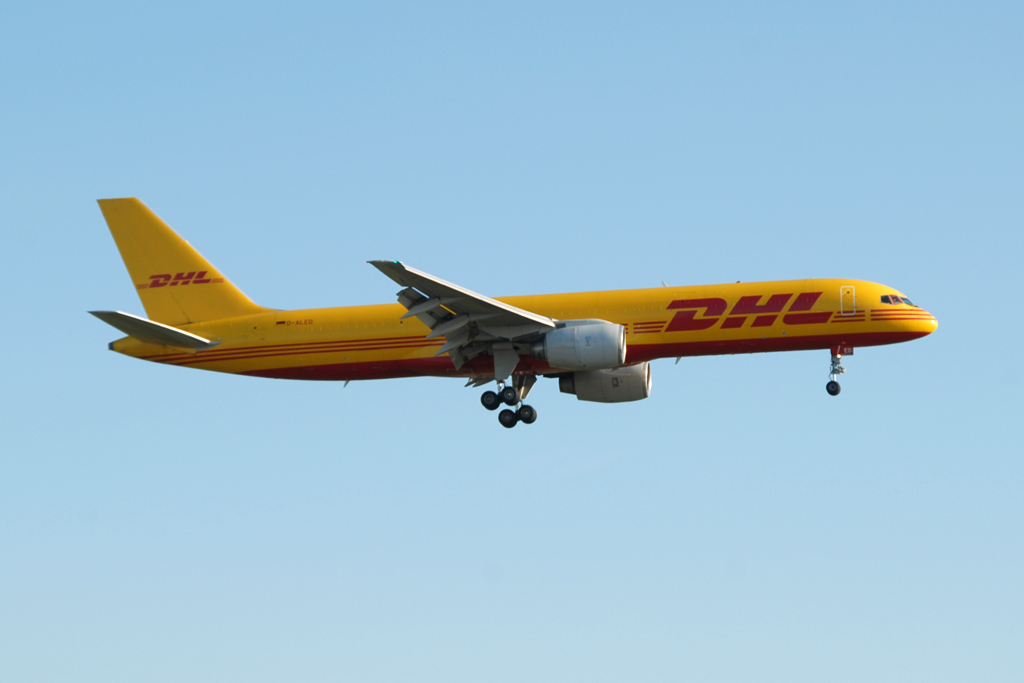
EAT Leipzig Boeing 757-200F

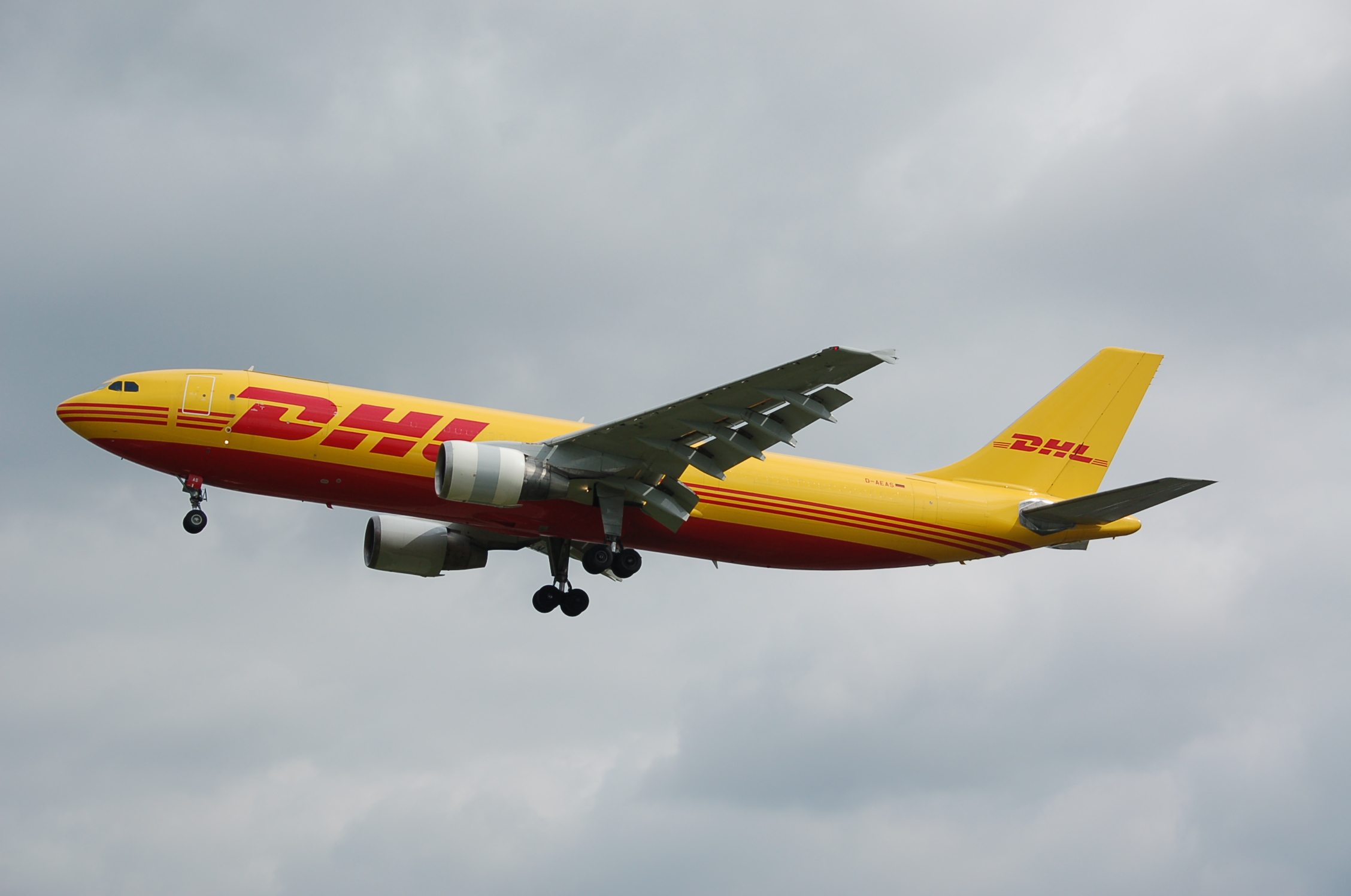
Airbus A300-600RFs make up most of the EAT Leipzig fleet.

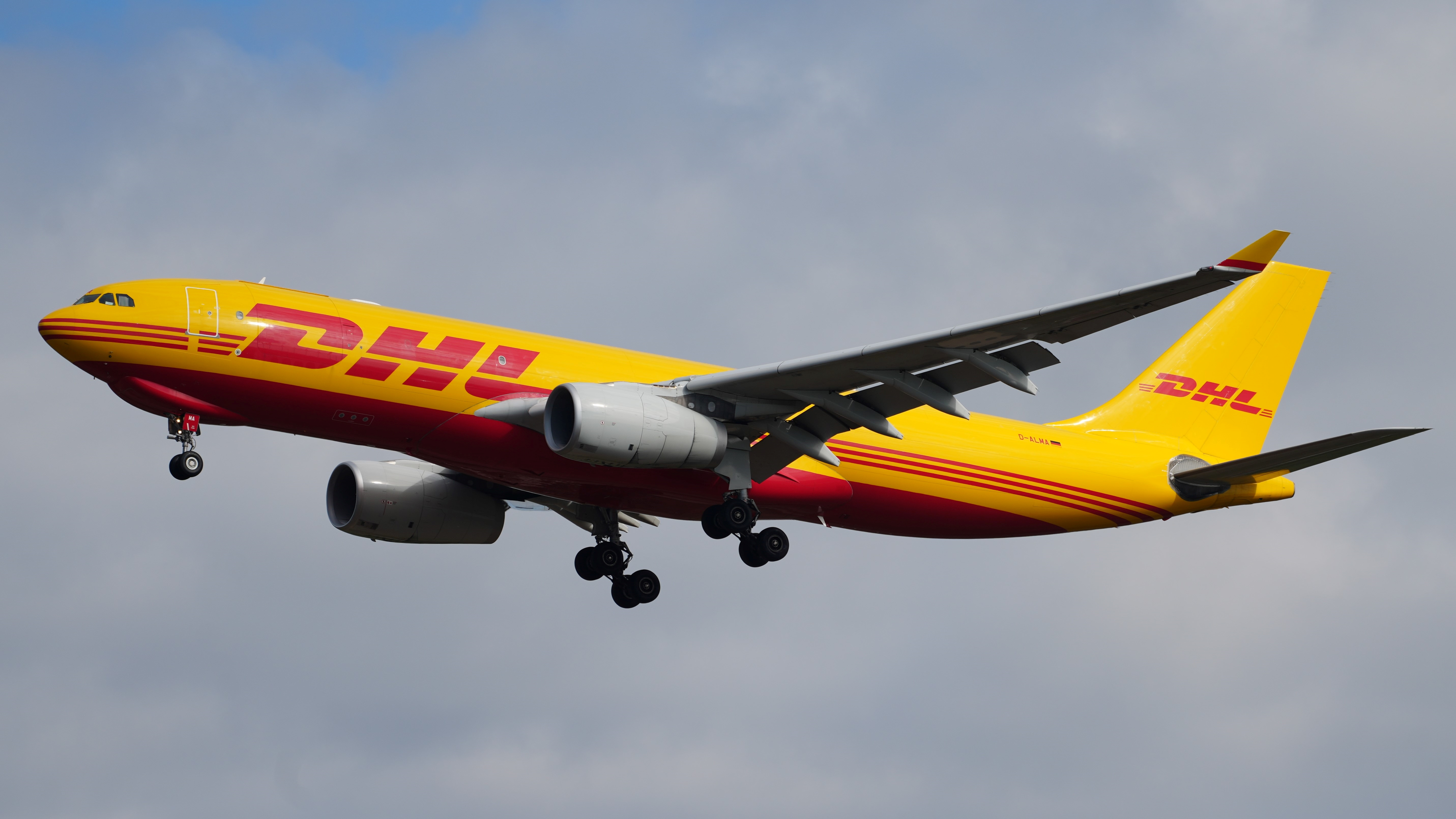
EAT Leipzig Airbus A330-200F

=== Current fleet ===
As of July 2026, European Air Transport Leipzig operates the following aircraft:

EAT Leipzig fleet
Aircraft	In service	Orders	Notes
Airbus A300-600RF	26		
Airbus A330-200F	3	—	
Airbus A330-300P2F	4	1	
Boeing 757-200PCF	2	—	
Total	35	1	

=== Former fleet ===
As of August 2025, European Air Transport Leipzig operated 27 Airbus A300, 3 Airbus A330-200F, 4 Airbus A330-300P2F and 2 Boeing 757-200PCF.

== Accidents and incidents ==
- On 25 November 2024, a Boeing 737-400F (registered as EC-MFE) flying as Swiftair Flight 5960 on behalf of EAT Leipzig, crashed into a house while on approach to Vilnius Airport in Vilnius, Lithuania. Out of the four occupants on board, one person died while two others were injured.

== See also ==
- List of airlines of Germany
