= Schkeuditz =

Town in Saxony, Germany

- Town
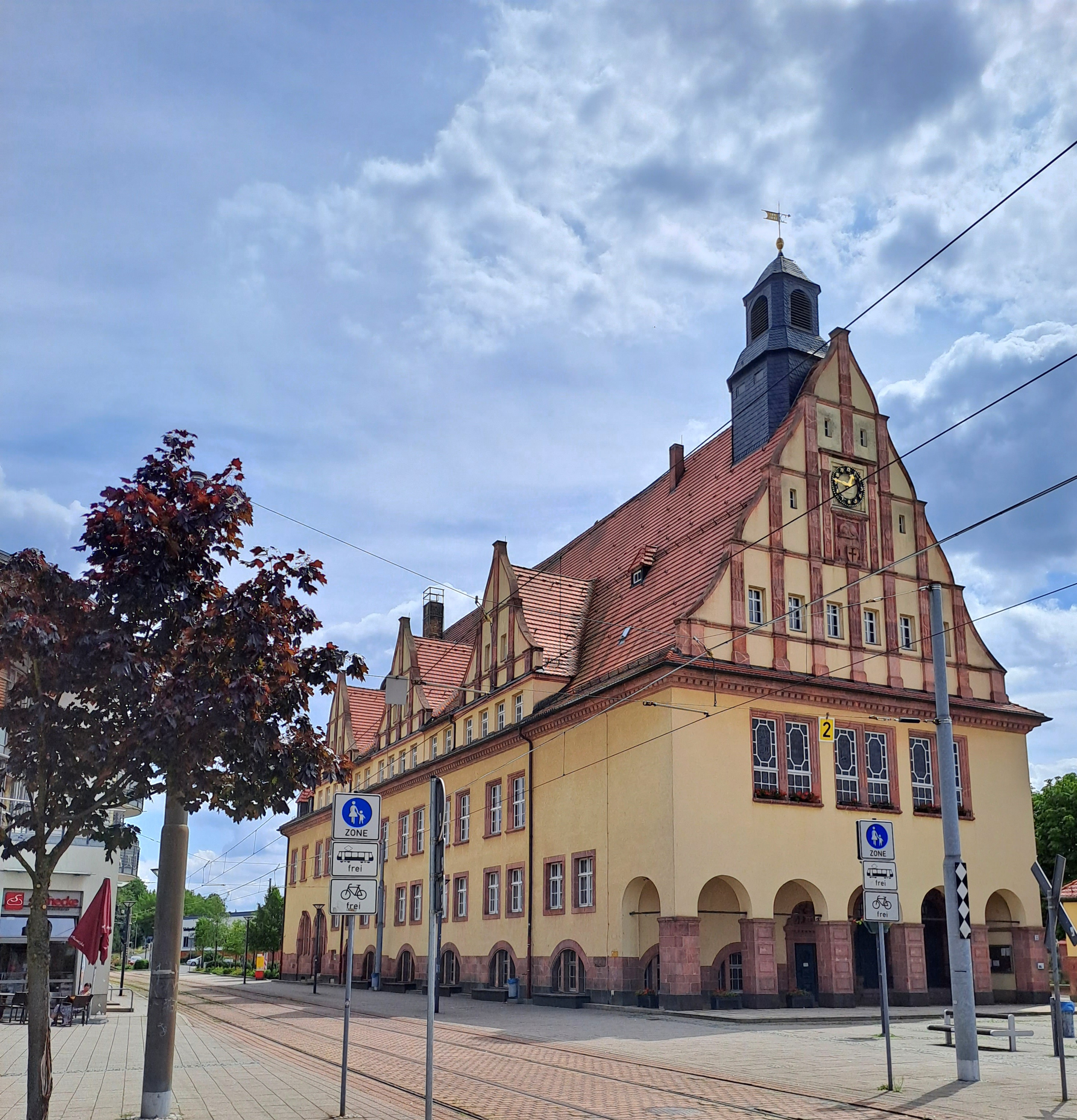
- Townhall in central Schkeuditz

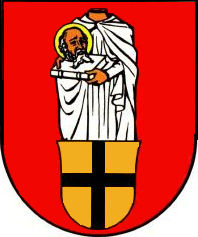
- Coat of arms

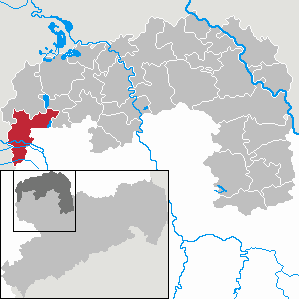
- Location of Schkeuditz within Nordsachsen district
- Interactive map of Schkeuditz
- Location within Germany Location within Saxony
- Coordinates: 51°24′N 12°13′E
- Country: Germany
- State: Saxony
- District: Nordsachsen
- Subdivisions: 10

Government
  - Mayor (2017–24): Rayk Bergner (CDU)

Area
  - Total: 81.47 km^{2} (31.46 sq mi)
- Elevation: 91–148 m (299–486 ft)

Population (2025-12-31)
  - Total: 19,145
  - Density: 235.0/km^{2} (608.6/sq mi)
- Time zone: UTC+01:00 (CET)
  - Summer (DST): UTC+02:00 (CEST)
- Postal codes: 04435
- Dialling codes: 034204
- Vehicle registration: TDO, DZ, EB, OZ, TG, TO
- Website: www.schkeuditz.de

Schkeuditz (German pronunciation: [ˈʃkɔʏdɪts]; Upper Sorbian: Skudźicy) is a Große Kreisstadt in the district of Nordsachsen, in Saxony, Germany. It is situated on the White Elster river, 12 km northwest of Leipzig. Leipzig/Halle Airport is located in Schkeuditz. The letter processing center for the greater Leipzig region is also located in Schkeuditz. "Schkeuditzer Kreuz", the first cloverleaf exchange in Germany was opened in 1936, and today is the intersection between the autobahns A9 and A14.

== History ==
The Linear Pottery Well excavated in the Schkeuditz locality of Altscherbitz is 7000 years old. Schkeuditz was first documented in the year 981 as a church in Merseburg bishopric with the name "scudici".

== Population over time ==
The population development over time is given in the following table. Like many towns in East-Germany, the population is lower today than just after reunification.

Historical population
Year	Pop.
1885	4,592
1910	7,462
1925	7,936
1933	13,548
1939	14,846
1950	18,913
1971	16,392
1981	14,208
1988	15,173
1990	^{*}19,473
1998	17,285
2001	19,027
2003	18,702
2005	18,594
2007	18,150
2011	17,413
2012	16,877
2013	16,961
2017	17,587
^* Using the current town boundaries. The town boundaries have expanded over time as shown in § Annexations. Source:

== Annexations ==
Former district	Date	Comment
Bienitz	1 January 2000	only Dölzig and Kleinliebenau
Dölzig	1 January 1994	Merged with Burghausen and Rückmarsdorf to Bienitz
Freiroda	1 March 1994	Merged with Radefeld
Gerbisdorf	1 December 1972	Merged with Freiroda
Glesien	1 January 1999	
Hayna	1 July 1973	Merged with Radefeld
Kleinliebenau	1 January 1957	Merged with Dölzig
Kursdorf	1 January 1994	
Lössen	1 July 1950	Merged with Wolteritz
Radefeld	1 January 1999	Partial disbursal to Leipzig (7 inhabitants)
Wehlitz	1 July 1950	
Wolteritz	1 March 1994	Annexed Radefeld

== Schladitzer See ==
In the northeastern part of Schkeuditz is the Schladitzer See. It is an artificial lake developed from a former opencast lignite mine. The Schladitzer See has been used as a bathing lake and water sports center since 2003.

== People ==
- Gerhard W. Menzel (1922–1980), writer
- Frank Siebeck (born 1949), hurdler
- Mark Siebeck (born 1975), volleyball player
- Peter Sack (born 1979), shot putter
