= Leipzig/Halle Airport =

Airport in Schkeuditz, Saxony, Germany

Leipzig/Halle Airport Flughafen Leipzig/Halle

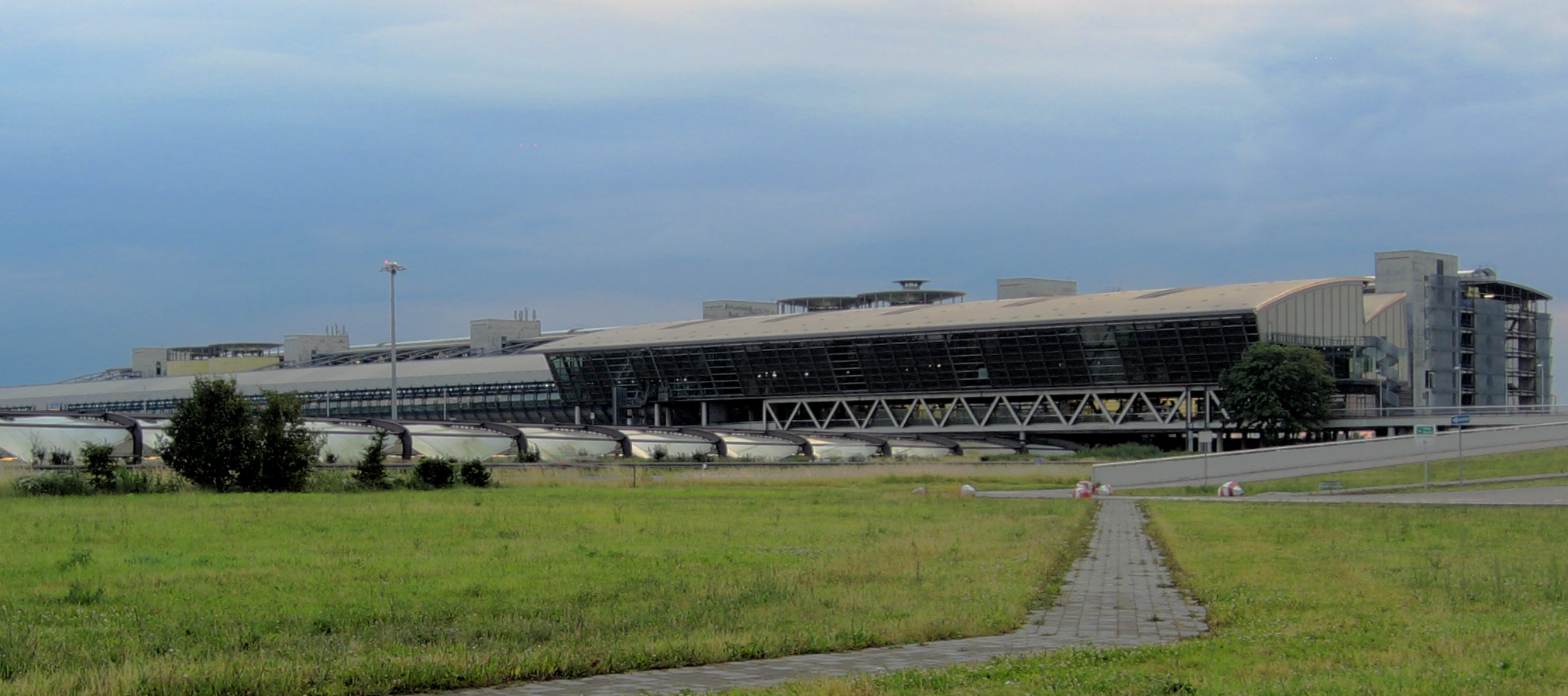
- IATA: LEJ; ICAO: EDDP

Summary
- Airport type: Public
- Owner: Mitteldeutsche Airport Holding AG
- Operator: Flughafen Leipzig/Halle GmbH
- Serves: Leipzig, Saxony; Halle, Saxony-Anhalt
- Location: Schkeuditz, Saxony, Germany
- Opened: 1927; 99 years ago
- Hub for: AeroLogic; Amazon Air; Antonov Airlines; DHL Aviation
- Elevation AMSL: 470 ft (140 m)
- Coordinates: 51°25′26″N 012°14′11″E
- Website: mdf-ag.com

Map
- Location of airport in Saxony

Runways
Direction	Length		Surface
Direction	m	ft	Surface
08L/26R	3,600	11,811	Concrete
08R/26L	3,600	11,811	Concrete

Statistics (2024)
- Passengers: 2,200,981 ▲+4,7%
- Aircraft movements: 76,827 ▼-4,6%
- Cargo (metric tons): 1,383,319 ▼-0,6%
- Sources: Statistics at ADV., AIP at German air traffic control, Eurostat.

Leipzig/Halle Airport (IATA: LEJ, ICAO: EDDP) is an international airport located in Schkeuditz, Saxony, Germany, and serves both Leipzig, Saxony, and Halle, Saxony-Anhalt. It is a state-owned enterprise and allows 24 hour take off and landing for cargo flights. It is notable for having the highest number of freight-only movements (arrivals and departures) in the entirety of the European Union.

As of 2024, the airport was the second-busiest cargo airport in Germany after Frankfurt Airport, and the fourth-busiest in Europe, having handled 1,383,319 metric tonnes of cargo. It is Germany's 12th largest airport by passengers and handled more than 2.19 million passengers in 2024, mainly on flights to European leisure destinations. The airport is DHL Aviation's main European hub and AeroLogic's main hub. Military installations have also been built at the airport for NATO and EU military aircraft.

== History ==
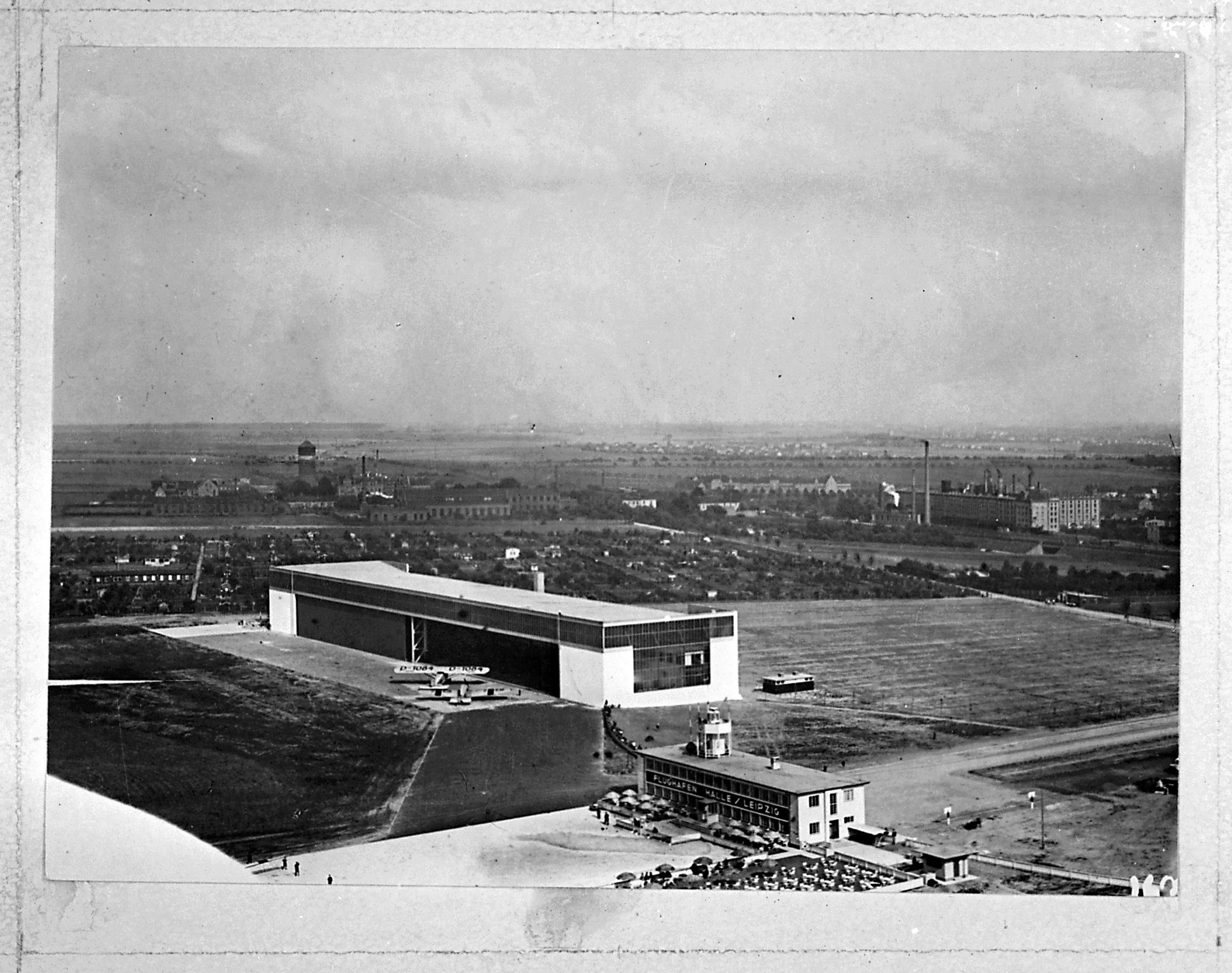
The airport in 1929

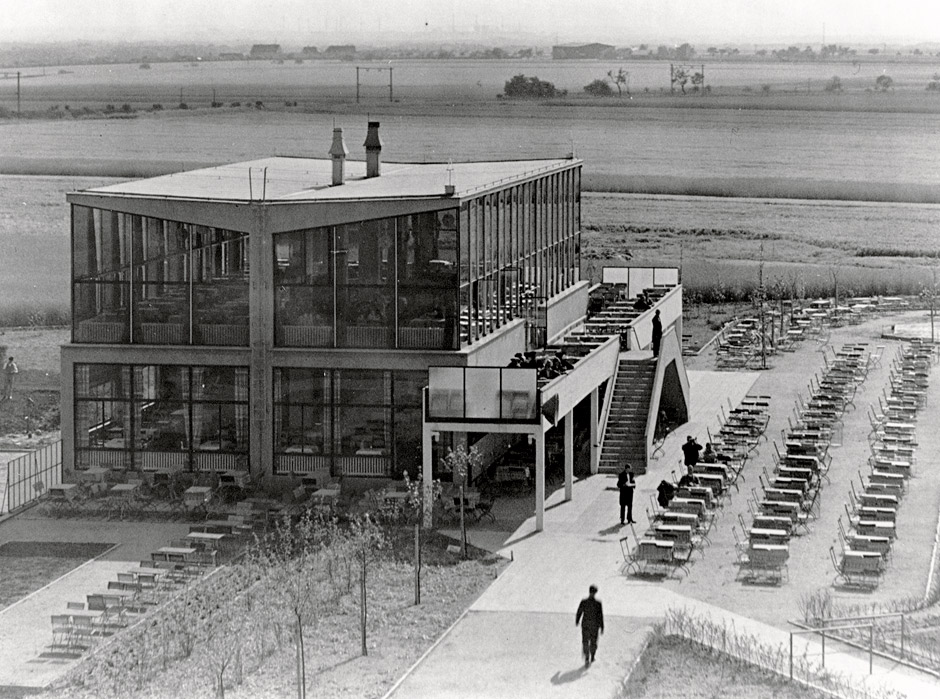
The airport's restaurant in 1931

=== Early years ===
The airport was built new from the ground up at a location between Halle and Leipzig from 1926 and opened in 1927 as Schkeuditz Airfield (Flugplatz Schkeuditz). In 1928, the airport was renamed Halle/Leipzig Airport (Flughafen Halle/Leipzig), which would later change order of the city names to its current name.

The airport structures were expanded in the 1930s, including a restaurant. A new terminal was added in 1936/1937, built in the then-widespread Nazi style. At the beginning of World War II, the airport was the fourth in the country for commercial traffic, with more than 40 takeoffs per day. This ended competely during the war, as the airport was entirely taken by the Luftwaffe and used only for military purposes. On April 16, 1944, it was bombed and mostly destroyed by Allied planes.

During the early years of the German Democratic Republic, the airport was rebuilt though used exclusively as an industrial airport. In 1957-1960 a new, 2500 m-long runway was added as part of plans of commercial air traffic in the country, but traffic in Leipzig remained scarce. Starting from 1963, twice a year the airport was used as the seat of the Leipzig Trade Fair, with regular service from the state's flag carrier Interflug; the structures, however, were dismantled after the fair's end, and only in 1968 a more modern terminal was built. In 1972, for the first time, the airport operated for the whole year.

On 18 March 1986, Air France flew a Concorde to Leipzig to coincide with the Leipziger Buchmesse (Leipzig book fair) as part of the special Concorde flights to East Germany. Two days later, British Airways flew a Concorde to Leipzig/Halle only once and never again. In the following years, Air France operated Concorde flights from Paris when the trade fair was held in Leipzig. Leipzig remains the only airport in Communist Bloc to be served by Concorde and only in Germany to have frequent Concorde flights (about ten or so times).

By 1988, traffic had doubled from 1972, reaching some 550,000 passengers per year. The terminal was enlarged including a new immigration hall, completed in 1984. The following year the departure hall was also upgraded.

In 1991, after the German Reunification, the current Terminal A was modernized. In 1992 for the first time annual passenger numbers reached 1,000,000. Construction of Terminal B was completed in 1996, and a new 3,500 m-long runway was added starting from 1998, being completed by 2003. A new control tower was inaugurated in 2000.

=== Development since 2000 ===
Despite its name, the airport is located in the town of Schkeuditz, Nordsachsen. A deal between the city of Leipzig and the Landkreis Delitzsch led to a land exchange. In 2007, Leipzig received land outside the airport while ownership of the airport land was transferred to Delitzsch. The District of Delitzsch, which by now has merged to become part of Landkreis Nordsachsen, owns and claims taxes from the grounds and commercial interest from the airport.

In early 2008, DHL Aviation moved its European hub from Brussels Airport to Leipzig/Halle, leading to a significant increase in cargo traffic at the airport. Leipzig bid to host the 2012 Olympic Games and the airport was modernised as a result, even though London was eventually awarded the games.

In spring 2013, Ryanair announced the start of operating six routes from Leipzig/Halle. One year later all of them, except the flights to London–Stansted, were terminated. In February 2015, Etihad Regional announced the immediate termination of all their Leipzig/Halle operations which had started only two years earlier. All three routes were shut down while two newly announced ones did not start.

In September 2016, Pakistan International Airlines announced plans to replace Manchester on their Islamabad - Manchester - New York City route with Leipzig/Halle in 2017 to lower operating costs and save time. As the airline holds Fifth Freedom rights, this would have been Leipzig/Halle's first passenger service to the United States. In October 2017, the airline announced it would end all routes to the United States, so plans to use Leipzig as a layover to New York-JFK never materialised.

In October 2016, DHL started major expansion of its freight facilities at the airport. Two new cargo terminals increased handling capacity by 50 percent.

In April 2018, the largest passenger airline at Leipzig/Halle Airport measured by weekly departures was Condor with 55 outgoing flights per week. The airline had stationed three Airbus A321 aircraft at the airport. The second-largest airline was Small Planet Airlines (Germany) with 18 outgoing flights per week. The airline stationed an Airbus A320 aircraft to serve several leisure destinations for TUI Group. It was followed by SunExpress Deutschland which operated 15 weekly departures and stationed for this a Boeing 737 aircraft at the airport.

In August 2018, DHL announced further expansion of its facilities at the airport. In addition to enlarging the apron, a new pilot training center was also planned. The number of employees was to increase from 5700 to 6000. At the same time, EAT Leipzig announced that they would add five used Airbus A330 freighters to their fleet, for a total of 36 aircraft. Also in August 2018, the Russian Volga-Dnepr Group announced plans to launch a new German freight subsidiary based at the airport. As of 2021, there were up to 170 nighttime take offs and landings for cargo operations.

In 2018, the airport and DHL extended an agreement for the latter to maintain a freight hub in Leipzig/Halle until at least 2019.

In October 2024, Ryanair announced the termination of all routes at three German airports including Leipzig/Halle, citing high operating costs. In October 2025, Condor announced the closure of its base at the airport with immediate effect, handing over a downsized network to sister carrier Marabu.

== Facilities ==
=== Terminal ===
The modern airport terminal structure extends over the adjacent motorway and railway. It integrates the main car park as well as the check-in-facilities and is connected to a pier equipped with six jet bridges as well as several apron stands. Due to its compact design, walking distances at the airport are short. The airport terminal has immigration facilities for international flights but no international transfer area.

=== Runways ===
The airport has two runways. Terminal access is south of the railway. Runway 08L/26R runs parallel to the road north of the railway, requiring aircraft to taxi on a bridge over the tracks and roads.

== Airlines and destinations ==
=== Passenger ===
The following airlines offer regular scheduled and charter flights at Leipzig/Halle Airport:

Airlines	Destinations
Air Cairo	Hurghada
AJet	Seasonal: Bodrum
Austrian Airlines	Vienna
BH Air	Hurghada
Corendon Airlines	Antalya; Seasonal: Hurghada
Eurowings	Palma de Mallorca
Freebird Airlines	Seasonal: Antalya; Seasonal charter: Burgas, Fuerteventura, Heraklion, Kos, Rhodes, Trabzon, Varna
Lufthansa	Frankfurt
Marabu	Seasonal: Chania, Corfu, Fuerteventura, Funchal, Gran Canaria, Heraklion, Hurghada, Kos, Palma de Mallorca, Rhodes, Tenerife–South
Nouvelair	Seasonal: Djerba, Monastir
Pegasus Airlines	Antalya
SunExpress	Antalya, Dalaman (begins 30 April 2027)

=== Cargo ===
Airlines	Destinations
AeroLogic	Bahrain, Bangkok–Suvarnabhumi, Bengaluru, Brussels, Cincinnati, Delhi, Dubai–International, East Midlands, Frankfurt, Hong Kong, Mexico City, Mumbai, Seoul–Incheon, Shanghai–Pudong, Shenzhen, Singapore, Stavanger, Tokyo–Narita
Amazon Air	Milan–Malpensa
DHL Aviation	Amsterdam, Athens, Bahrain, Bangkok–Suvarnabhumi, Barcelona, Basel/Mulhouse, Belgrade, Bengaluru, Bologna, Bratislava, Brno, Brussels, Budapest, Cincinnati, Cologne/Bonn, Copenhagen, Delhi, Dubai–International, Dublin, East Midlands, Edinburgh, Frankfurt, Gdańsk, Geneva, Helsinki, Hong Kong, Katowice, Linz, Ljubljana, London–Heathrow, London–Luton, Los Angeles, Lyon, Madrid, Marseille, Milan–Malpensa, Mumbai, Munich, Nantes, New York–JFK, Oslo, Ostrava, Paris–Charles de Gaulle, Pisa, Rome–Ciampino, Seoul–Incheon, Shanghai–Pudong, Shannon, Skopje, Sofia, Stockholm–Arlanda, Stuttgart, Tashkent, Tel Aviv, Treviso, Turku, Vilnius, Vitoria, Warsaw–Chopin
MNG Airlines	Istanbul, Istanbul–Sabiha Gökçen

=== Military ===
Some US airlines have flown to Leipzig/Halle on behalf of the US Department of Defense, to bring US Army troops and US Marines to Afghanistan and Iraq. Leipzig/Halle is used as a technical stop for refueling on these flights. They do not appear at any official timetable. Marines and soldiers flown via Leipzig/Halle are listed as transit passengers in its traffic statistics. Military charter flights are also operated via Leipzig/Halle, for example on behalf of NATO.

== Statistics ==
General plan of the airport

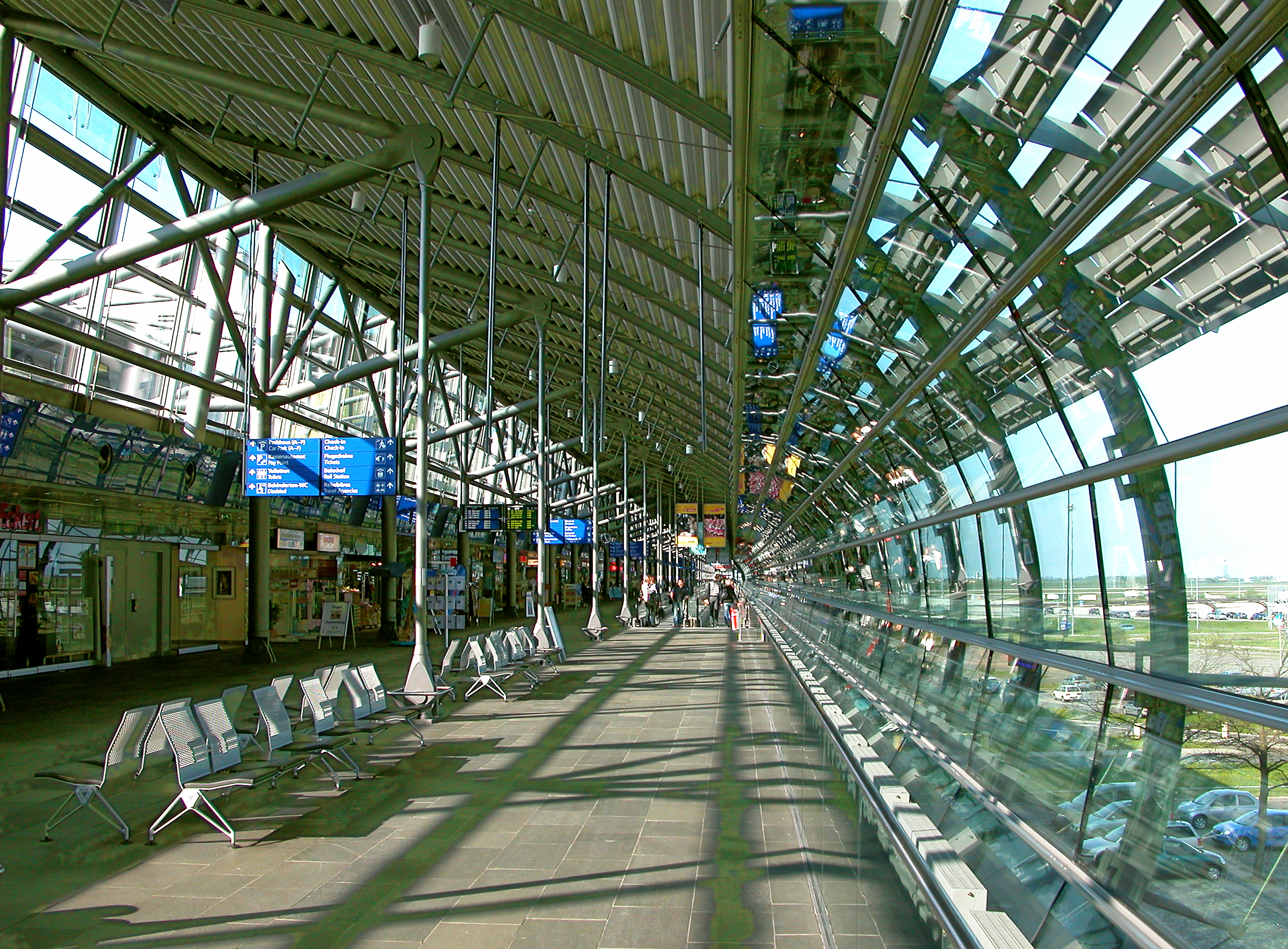
Concourse connecting the check-in and airside areas

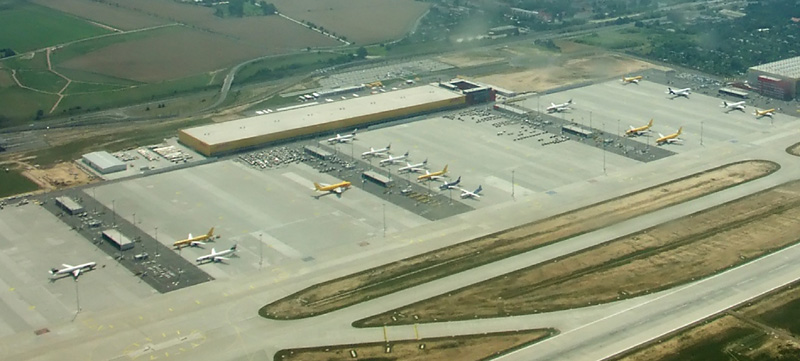
Cargo facilities

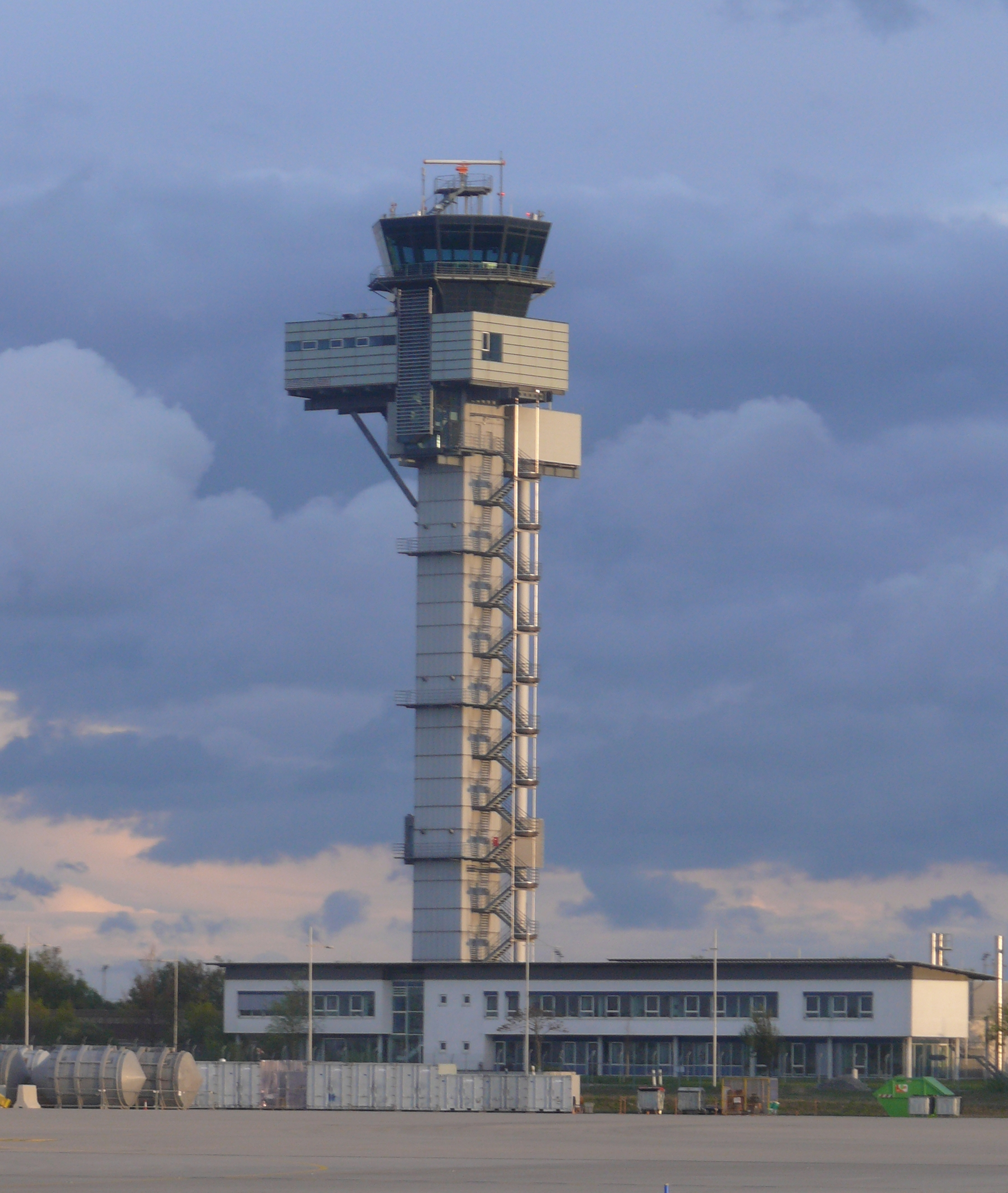
Control tower

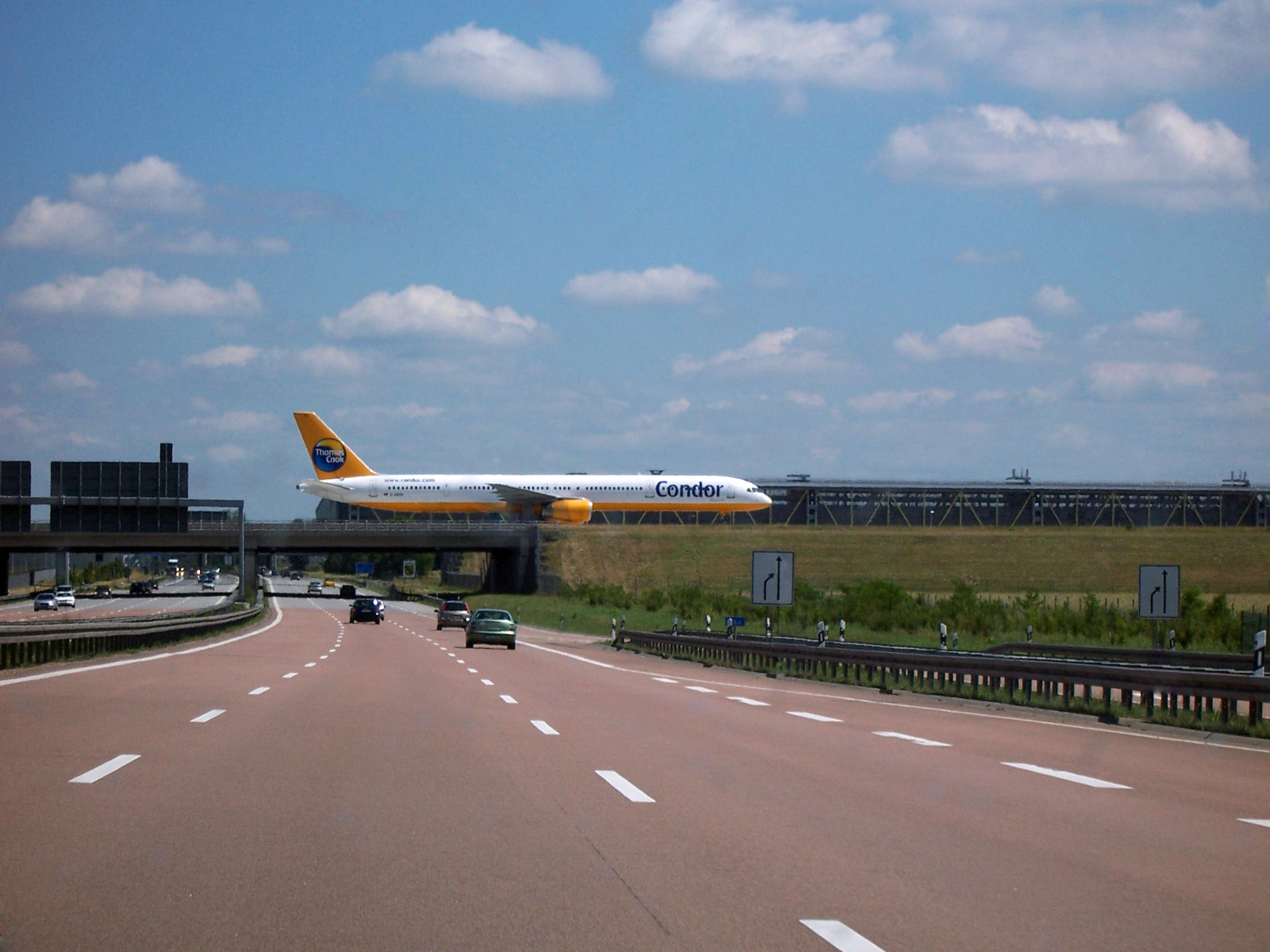
Taxiway crossing the Autobahn

	Passengers	Movements	Freight (in t)
1990	274,878	9,549	366
1991	▲634,424	▲26,089	▲4,372
1992	▲1,073,378	▲42,960	▲8,611
1993	▲1,521,436	▲48,510	▲17,482
1994	▲1,901,797	▲52,590	▲23,189
1995	▲2,104,822	▲53,807	▲25,225
1996	▲2,186,649	▼50,298	▼22,410
1997	▲2,248,852	▼47,284	▼17,220
1998	▼2,108,779	▼43,778	▼12,866
1999	▲2,162,769	▲47,944	▲15,220
2000	▲2,288,931	▼47,030	▲17,086
2001	▼2,185,130	▼42,408	▼15,799
2002	▼1,988,854	▼41,209	▲16,882
2003	▼1,955,070	▼40,303	▲17.559
2004	▲2,041,046	▼39,316	▼12,575
2005	▲2,127,895	▼37,905	▲15,641
2006	▲2,348,011	▲42,417	▲29,330
2007	▲2,723,000	▲50,972	▲101,364
2008	▼2,462,256	▲59,924	▲442,453
2009	▼2,421,382	▲60,150	▲524,082
2010	▼2,348,597	▲62,247	▲663,024
2011	▼2,266,743	▲64,097	▲760,344
2012	▲2,286,151	▼62,688	▲863,665
2013	▼2,240,860	▼61,668	▲887,101
2014	▲2,331,399	▲63,569	▲910,708
2015	▼2,321,975	▲65,061	▲988,240
2016	▼2,192,145	▼64,492	▲1,052,372
2017	▲2,365,141	▲69,815	▲1,138,477
2018	▲2,571,119	▲79,218	▲1,221,429
2019	▲2,618,772	▼78,980	▲1,238,343
2020	▼530,221	▼64,483	▲1,383,485
2021	▲667,784	▲76,104	▲1,591,618
2022	▲1,558,602	▲80,902	▼1,510,575
2023	▲2,101,425	▼80,536	▼1,393,747
2024	▲2,200,981	▼76,827	▼1,383,319
2025	▼2,123,269	▼74,411	▲1,391,762
^{Source: Leipzig/Halle Airport Traffic statistics}

== Ground transportation ==
=== Train ===
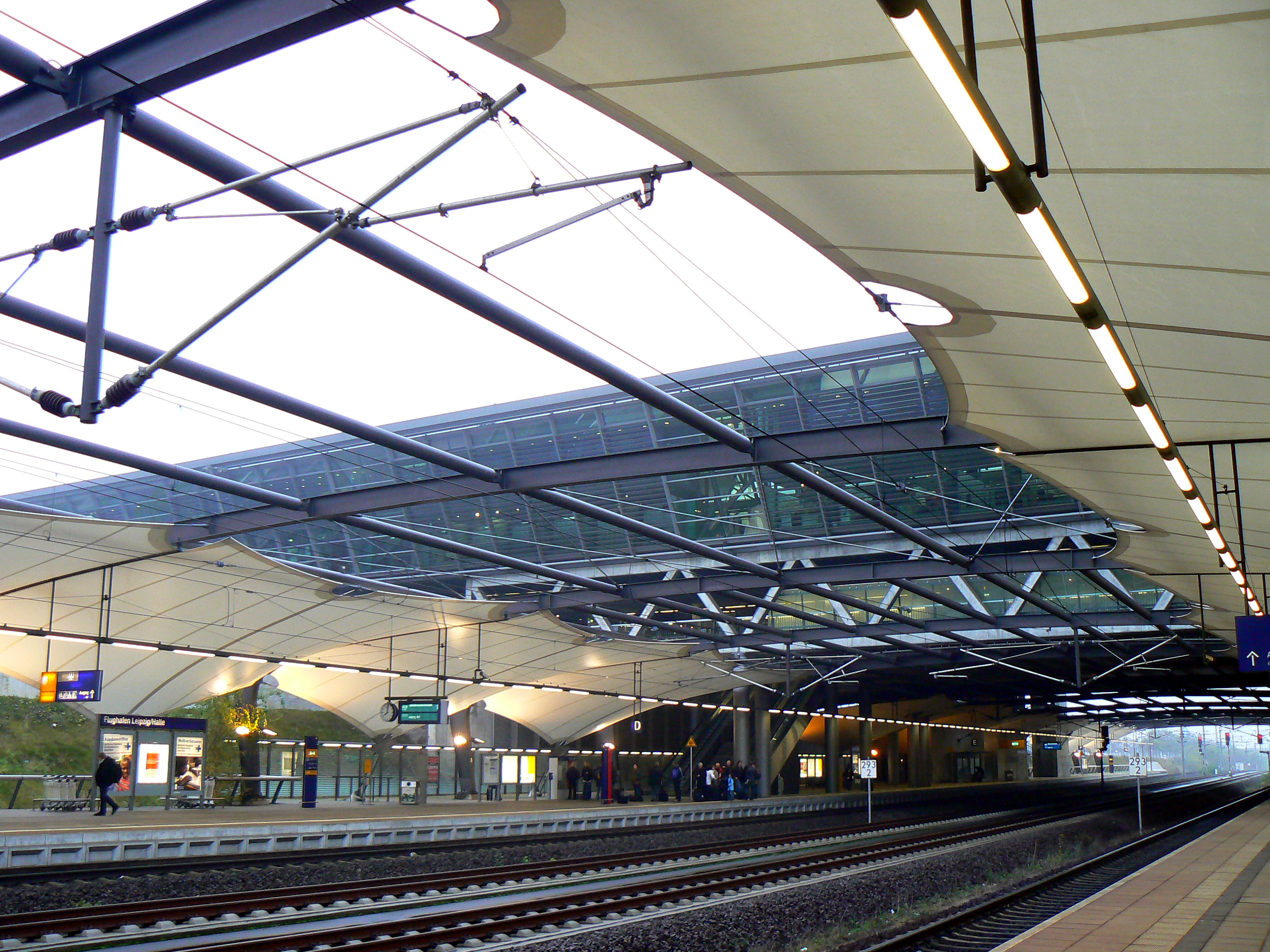
Leipzig/Halle Airport railway station

Leipzig/Halle Airport railway station is located directly under the passenger terminal and has Intercity connections on the Dresden-Magdeburg-Hanover-Cologne route. Two lines of the S-Bahn Mitteldeutschland connect directly to Leipzig and Halle, and onwards to Altenburg and Zwickau with connections to most parts of Central Germany.

=== Car ===
The airport is connected to two motorways: the A14 connecting to Dresden (130 km), Halle (20 km) and Magdeburg (130 km), and the A9 connecting to Munich (430 km), Nuremberg (280 km), and Berlin (180 km).

=== Coach ===
Flixbus connects in both directions twice per day to Dresden, Göttingen, and Kassel and once per day to Dortmund and Cologne.

== In popular culture ==
The airport's facilities have been featured in major films and TV shows during recent years:

- In December 2004, Leipzig/Halle Airport was a filming location for Flightplan starring Jodie Foster and Peter Sarsgaard. According to the film, Jodie Foster's flight departs from Berlin but all shots showing Berlin's supposed airport were actually taken at Leipzig/Halle Airport.
- In 2010, the check-in area of Leipzig/Halle was a filming location for Unknown starring Liam Neeson and Diane Kruger.
- The airport's terminal and apron were featured heavily in the Marvel Cinematic Universe's live-action film Captain America: Civil War (2016). Branded equipment featuring the airport's logo was shown several times during the scenes.
- The airport's hallway between the check-in area and the public departure/arrival area was featured in the Netflix series Inventing Anna, which tells the story of Anna Sorokin. In the series, an American journalist flies to Berlin to conduct research on Anna's upbringing for her next article but all airport scenes were shot at Leipzig/Halle Airport.

== Accidents and incidents ==
- On 1 September 1975, Interflug Flight 1107 crashed on approach to the airport when the Tupolev TU-134 descended too quickly, not following the proper approach path, while the crew failed to monitor their altitude, leading to a CFIT. 27 of the 34 people on board perished.

=== Leipzig Airport drone attack ===
- On 4 August 2026, an incident with an explosive drone caused the closure of the airport. German officials described it as a hybrid war scenario, and an investigation launched by the Federal Prosecutor of Germany found Russia as the perpetrator of the attack.

== Criticism ==
The airport is owned by the Mitteldeutsche Flughafen Holding AG, a state-owned enterprise. According to public records for 2005 to 2014, its operating losses totalled almost 570 million € and from 2000 to 2020 they were 800 million €. The main reason for the losses have been take-off and landing fees, which do not cover operating costs. DHL has been profiting from these low prices; its particular subsidy DHL-Hub Leipzig GmbH does not publish its own figures, but as part of the DHL Express division, it has been making profits for many years, with 2.04 billion in 2019 alone.

Residents in the Saale district have been complaining about the noise pollution for years and have been asking to adapt start and landing fees, pricing up night flights.

== See also ==
- Transport in Germany
- List of airports in Germany
- Kursdorf, a ghost village located between the airport's runways
- Linear Pottery Well Altscherbitz
