= Kursdorf =

Ghost village within Leipzig/Halle Airport, in Saxony, Germany

- Ortsteil (district)
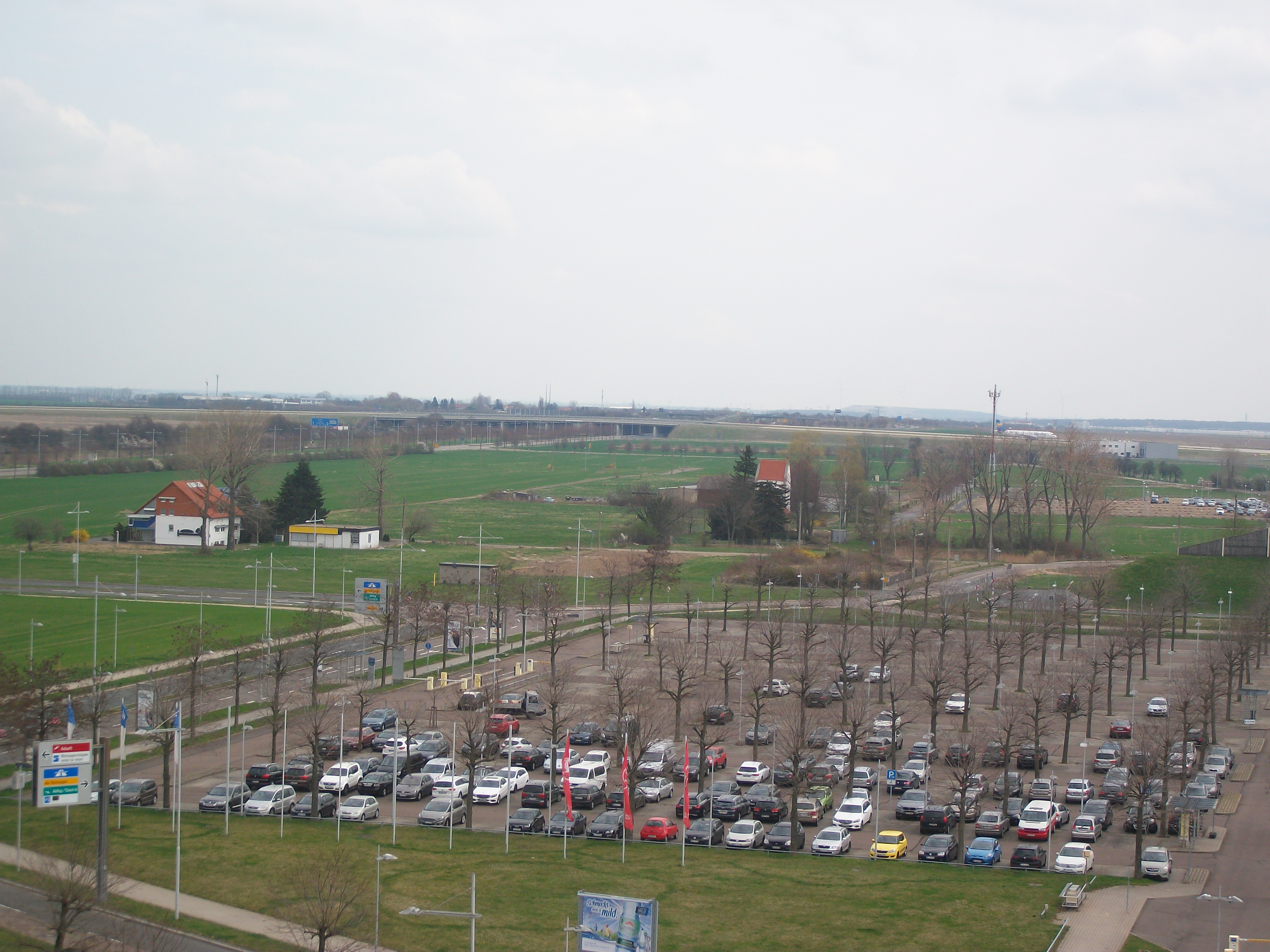
- View towards Kursdorf from the west (2018)

- Location within Germany
- Coordinates: 51°25′08″N 12°13′57″E
- Country: Germany
- State: Saxony
- District: Nordsachsen
- Municipality: Schkeuditz

Population (2017)
  - Total: 0

Kursdorf is a ghost town in Schkeuditz, Saxony, Germany. The site is located near the state border with Saxony-Anhalt. Situated between the two runways of Leipzig/Halle Airport (Germany's second-busiest cargo airport), the village has been described as the "loudest village in Germany." Its population has declined since the mid-20th century, to the point that since 2017, the village has had no inhabitants.

== Location ==
Diagram of Leipzig/Halle Airport, with Kursdorf labeled

Kursdorf is located within Leipzig/Halle Airport, in the town of Schkeuditz between Leipzig and Halle (Saale). To the south is runway 08R/26L, and to the north is the Erfurt–Leipzig/Halle high-speed railway (near the Leipzig/Halle Airport station), Autobahn 14, and runway 08L/26R. Being surrounded by runways and taxiways, the only way out of the village is to the east, under an aircraft bridge.

== History ==
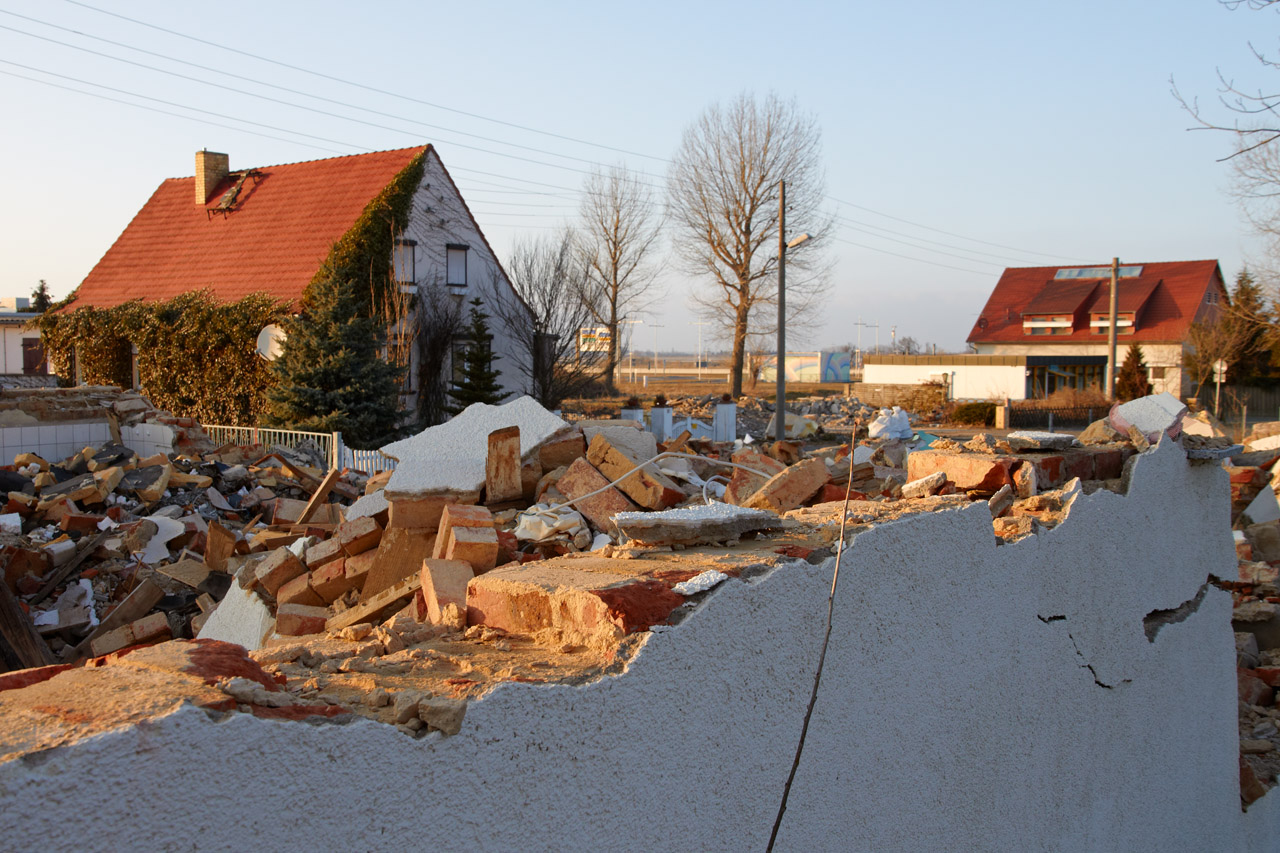
Demolished house in Kursdorf in 2011

The town has been recorded since at least 1500, originally as Kunsstorf and Kurzsdorf. It was part of Amt Schkeuditz until the 1800s, when Landkreis Merseburg was established. It was then moved to Kreis Leipzig-Land as part of East German district reforms in 1992. In 1994 the town was annexed into Schkeuditz, which was later reorganized into the districts of Leipziger Land (1994–1999), Delitzsch (1999–2008) and Nordsachsen (2008–).

The church in Kursdorf was built in the 14th century, making it one of the oldest in the Kirchenkreis (church district); its south side is inscribed with the years 1310 and 1345, possibly due to rebuilding. Unlike most churches, its tower faces east. The altar, dating from 1777, and the organ of the church are still preserved. The building was renovated in 2001.

The population of the village has gradually declined since 1950 (at a peak of around 500), mainly because of excessive noise levels; onsite sensors indicated that the average sound level was over 58.7 decibels due to noise from cars, trains, and planes. Kursdorf was described as a "Schallinferno" (sound inferno) and "das lauteste Dorf Deutschlands" (the loudest village in Germany) by Der Tagesspiegel. The airport became a hub of DHL Aviation, leading to increased noise levels in the nighttime when cargo flights arrive and depart. As a result, Leipzig/Halle Airport invested over 100 million euros into soundproofing for the village, including earthen walls, soundproof windows, and reinforced roofing, but many residents relocated to Altscherbitz, another village in Schkeuditz. Residents also described the smell as "almost unbearable" due to fuels like kerosene constantly being burned by vehicles.

The "Friendly Hotel", built in 1997, was sold to the district of Nordsachsen for over 500,000 euros in 2015. It was used to accommodate asylum seekers, of which there were over 600 in the district.

In 2011, 44 vacant houses in the village were demolished for materials, and in 2017, 27 more were demolished for safety reasons. A parking lot was built in their place. The last residents moved out in 2017, making it a ghost town. The church and former school (both under monument protection) remained, as well as the airport's medical center and the Friendly Hotel. The last Christvesper (Christmas Eve service) at the church occurred in 2015.

Historical population
Year	1568	1716	1818	1895	1910	1939	1950	1964	1990	2006	2009	2013	2017
Pop.	19	24	181	299	398	433	537	407	271	119	37	12	0
±%	—	+26.3%	+654.2%	+65.2%	+33.1%	+8.8%	+24.0%	−24.2%	−33.4%	−56.1%	−68.9%	−67.6%	−100.0%
