= Mark Siebeck =

German volleyball player (born 1975)

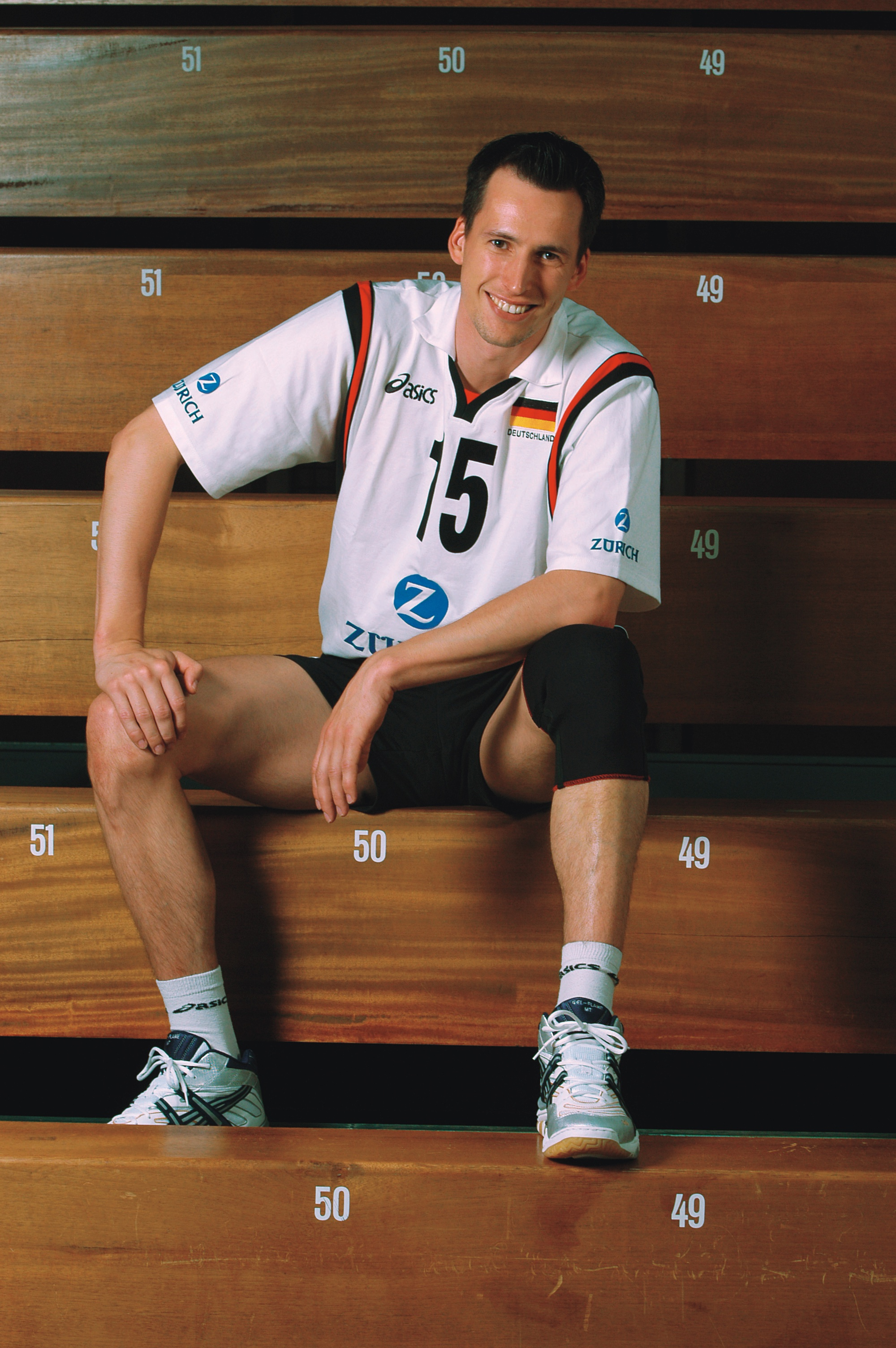
Mark Siebeck

Mark Siebeck (born October 14, 1975 in Schkeuditz, Saxony) is a volleyball player from Germany, who played for the Men's National Team in the 2000s. He played as a wing-spiker.

== Honours ==
- 2001 FIVB World League — 13th place
- 2001 European Championship — 9th place
- 2002 FIVB World League — 9th place
- 2003 FIVB World League — 10th place
- 2003 European Championship — 7th place
