= 1995 Gagauz autonomy referendums =

Local referendum in some localities of the south of the Republic of Moldova Referendumului local în unele localități din sudul Republicii Moldova (Romanian)
- 5 March 1995
- Outcome: 30 localities join the new Gagauz autonomous unit

Local referendums were held in several localities of southern Moldova on 5 March 1995 to determine the territory of Gagauzia. 30 of the 36 communes voted to join the new Autonomous Territorial Unit of Gagauzia. In Svetlîi commune, results were invalidated due to voting irregularities, and another referendum was held on 26 March 1995.

== Background ==
On 23 December 1994, Parliament of Moldova adopted a law granting autonomy status to Gagauzia, thus ending the five-year-long Gagauzia conflict. According to a report by Infotag, 27 Gagauz-majority settlements automatically qualified for the referendums, and an additional 15 would qualify if one third of the population demanded one.

== Results ==
Some of the communities approved by more than 90%. Turnout was about 70%. Taraclia and surrounding communes rejected the referendum.

Communes approved
District	Today part of
Ceadîr-Lunga
Comrat (capital)
Vulcănești
Alexeevca	Svetlîi
Svetlîi	Svetlîi
Avdarma
Baurci
Beșalma
Beșghioz
Bugeac
Carbalia
Cazaclia
Cioc-Maidan
Cișmichioi
Chioselia Rusă
Chiriet-Lunga
Chirsova
Congaz
Congazcicul de Jos	Congazcicul de Sus
Congazcicul de Sus	Congazcicul de Sus
Dudulești	Congazcicul de Sus
Copceac
Cotovscoe
Dezghingea
Etulia	Etulia
Etulia Nouă	Etulia
Ferapontievca
Gaidar
Joltai
Tomai

== Aftermath ==
On 28 May 1995, another local referendum was held to determine the capital of the region alongside the local elections, with Comrat being chosen.

In November 1998, the local councils of the town of Basarabeasca and the commune of Burlăceni requested referendums to join the Gagauz autonomy. However, this was rejected by Central Electoral Commission of Moldova.
