= Ialpug =

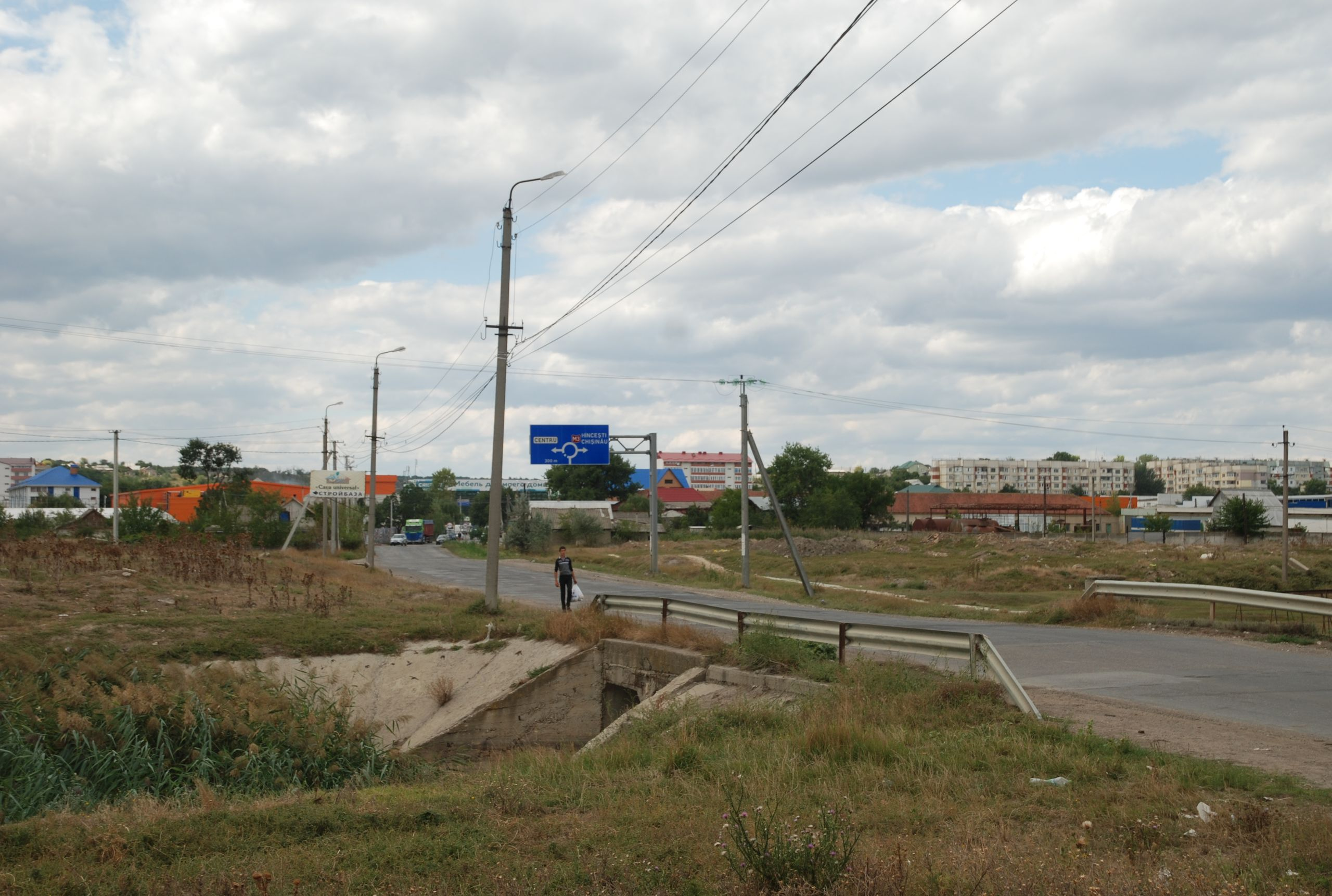

Location
- Country: Moldova, Ukraine

Physical characteristics
- Mouth
  - location: Lake Yalpuh
  - coordinates: 45°40′37″N 28°35′31″E
- Length: 142 km (88 mi)

Basin features
- Progression: Lake Yalpuh→ Lake Kuhurlui→ Danube→ Black Sea

The Ialpug (Romanian: Râul Ialpug) or Yalpuh (Ukrainian: Ялпуг) is a river that crosses Moldova and the Odesa Oblast of Ukraine.

The river is a left tributary of the Danube, the Black Sea basin. It flows into Lake Yalpuh. The largest settlements in the Yalpug valley are Comrat (Moldova) and Bolgrad (Ukraine).

In order to reduce the negative impact of floods and efficient water use, reservoirs were built on the river in the 20th century. The main anthropogenic impact on the state of the river is exerted by industrial and economic facilities located in its valley. The water of the Yalpug river is polluted with sulfates and chlorides.

== History ==
The name of the river is of Turanian, probably Polovtsian origin. In the Polovtsian language, the adjective jalpy meant "wide, sprawling", "ahead, shallow".

In his paper Descriptio Moldaviae, written in Latin 1714–1716, the scholar voivode Dimitrie Cantemir thus describes this river: "Cahulul, Salcia and Ialpuhul, which are in Moldavia and Bessarabia, increase the Danube. Of the latter, only the Ialpuh flows without consistency, the others are more stable than flowing."

== Description ==
It originates east of the village of Tomai, Leova District), flows in the south direction in parallel with the Prut, Cimișlia District, Gagauzia, Taraclia District, then Bolhrad Raion in Ukraine. The Yalpug originates on the southern slopes of the Central Moldavian Highlands, near south of the village Yalpug (Cimişlia District, Moldova). In the upper part it flows through the Budzha Plain, in the lower part - through the Black Sea Lowland. It flows mainly south. It flows into the northern part of Lake Yalpuh near the western outskirts of the city of Bolhrad.

The length is 114 km, but the first Ukrainian-language Ukrainian General Encyclopedia of 1933 edition gives the river length as 107 km. Within Ukraine, the river is 10 km long. The area of the Yalpug drainage basin is 3,180 km², within Ukraine 52 km². The slope of the river is 1.1 m/km.

The Yalpug Valley is canyon-like in its upper reaches, wide in its lower reaches, reaching a width of 3.5–4 km. The riverbed is winding. The right slopes of the valley are steep, strongly dissected, the left slopes are gentle. The width of the floodplain varies from 0.5 to 1.5 km (lower reaches). In its lower reaches, the river is heavily swamped.

The river flows in a temperate climate. The average temperature of the river basin in January is −3 °C, in July 22 °C. Precipitation is approximately 400 mm per year. In summer, the river dries up. The river is fed by groundwater and sediments.

In order to prevent floods on the Yalpug River, several reservoirs were built (in Moldova).

The river's waters are used to irrigate agricultural fields. Agricultural lands occupy more than 85% of the valley's territory. Wheat, corn, tobacco, sunflower are grown. Large areas are devoted to vineyards and orchards.

The capital of the Gagauzia, the city of Comrat, is located above the river in Moldova, as well as the villages of Dezghingea, Bugeac, Chirsova, Besalma, Congaz, Chumai and Mirne. On the territory of Ukraine, in the river valley, the city of Bolhrad is located.

The water quality in the Ialpug River is deteriorating, and its mineralization is gradually increasing due to chlorides, sulfates, sodium and magnesium. The river is the main polluter of the waters of Lake Ialpug.
