= Gagauz =

Gagauz or Gagauzian may refer to:

- The Gagauz people, an ethnic group living in Moldova and Ukraine
  - Gagauz people in Moldova
  - Gagauz people in Ukraine
- Gagauz language, a Turkic language spoken by the Gagauz people
- Gagauzia, homeland of the Gagauz people and autonomous division in Moldova
