= Oleksandr Tkachenko (politician, born 1984) =

Ukrainian politician

- Олександр Ткаченко
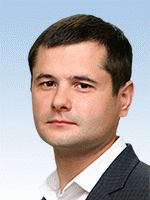
- Official portrait, 2019

People's Deputy of Ukraine
- Incumbent
- Assumed office 29 August 2019
- Preceded by: Vitaly Barvinenko
- Constituency: Odesa Oblast, No. 141

Personal details
- Born: 15 June 1984 (age 42) Congaz, Moldavian SSR, Soviet Union (now Gagauzia, Moldova)
- Party: Servant of the People
- Other political affiliations: Independent; Party of Greens of Ukraine
- Education: National University Odesa Law Academy

Oleksandr Mykhailovych Tkachenko (Ukrainian: Олександр Михайлович Ткаченко; born 15 June 1984) is a Ukrainian politician currently serving as a People's Deputy of Ukraine from Ukraine's 141st electoral district since 29 August 2019. He is a member of Servant of the People.

== Early life and career ==
Oleksandr Mykhailovych Tkachenko was born on 15 June 1984 in the village of Congaz, in what is now the autonomous region of Gagauzia within Moldova. A graduate of the National University Odesa Law Academy, Tkachenko worked as a corporate legal consultant and manager at a law firm from 2007 to 2016 before joining the Art de Leks law firm as a managing partner. He has been a lawyer since 2011.

== Political career ==
In the 2014 Ukrainian parliamentary election, Tkachenko was an unsuccessful candidate for People's Deputy of Ukraine from the Party of Greens of Ukraine, placed 30th on their electoral list. He was not a member of the party, instead being an independent.

In the 2019 Ukrainian parliamentary election, Tkachenko again ran to be a People's Deputy of Ukraine, this time from Servant of the People in Ukraine's 141st electoral district in Odesa Oblast. At the time of the election, he was an independent. He was successfully elected, defeating incumbent Vitaly Barvinenko with 36.83% to Barvinenko's 19.90%, a margin of 16.93%.

In the Verkhovna Rada (Ukraine's national parliament), Tkachenko joined the Servant of the People faction and the Verkhovna Rada Anti-Corruption Committee. He also joined the inter-factional associations Blockchain4Ukraine, For Odeshchyna, and South Ukraine. He is also head of the inter-parliamentary relations group with Cyprus.

In March 2020, Tkachenko was one of the People's Deputies from Servant of the People to sign a letter expressing his opposition to the suggestion of the Trilateral Contact Group on Ukraine to establish an advisory council including Ukrainian separatist groups, in opposition to the position of his party at the time.
