= Congazcicul de Sus =

Congazcicul de Sus Kongazçık Yukarkı
- Commune
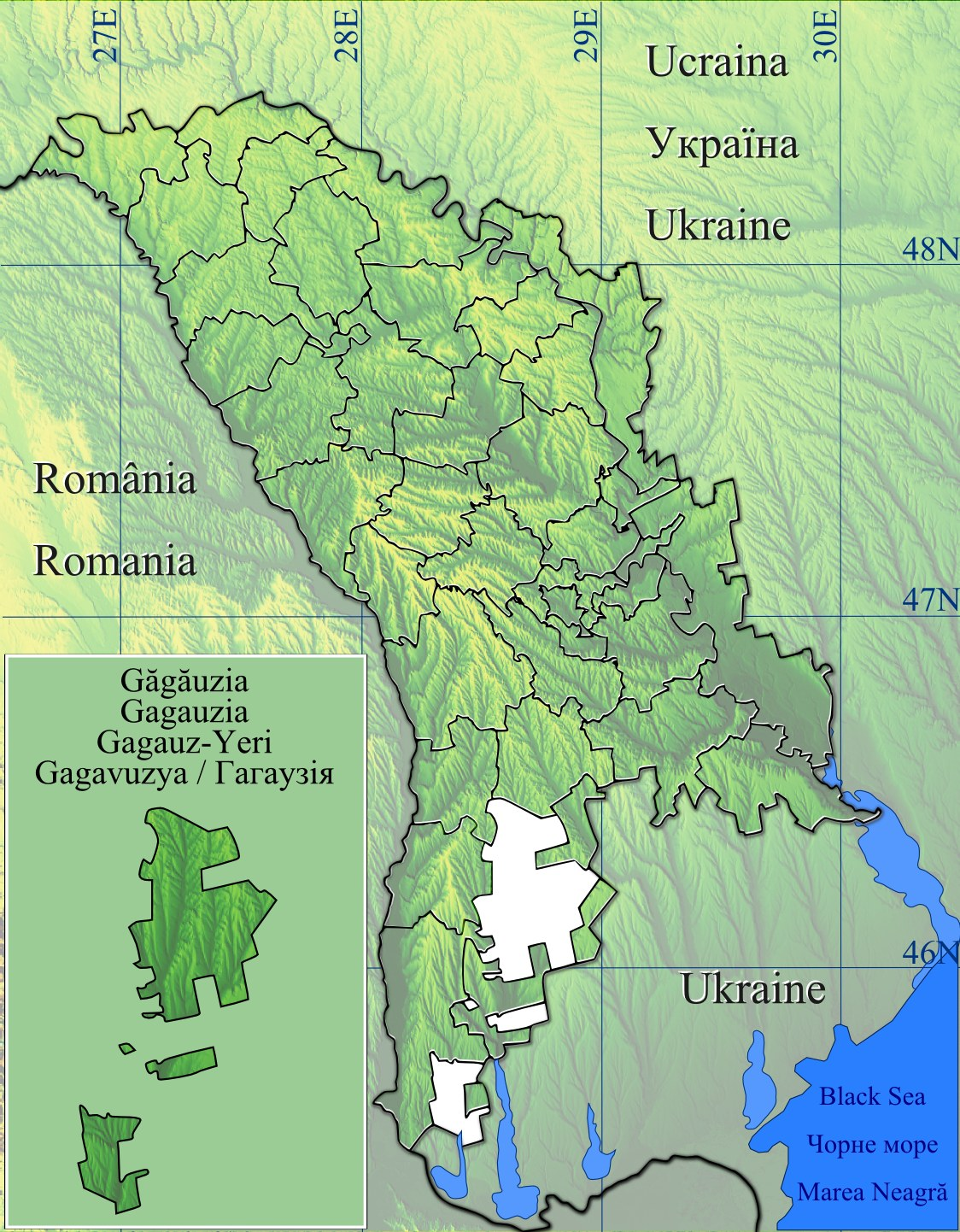
- Location of Congazcicul de Sus in Moldova
- Coordinates: 46°19′53″N 28°33′50″E
- Country: Moldova
- Autonomous Region: Gagauzia
- Founded: 1902, 1905, 1921

Government
  - Mayor: Yevgeny Tukan

Population (2024)
  - Total: 1,396

Ethnicity (2024 census)
  - Gagauz people: 70.12%
  - Moldovans: 22.85%
  - other: 3.45%
- Time zone: UTC+2 (EET)
- Climate: Cfb
- Website: congazcic.md

Congazcicul de Sus (Gagauz: Kongazçık Yukarkı) is a commune and village in the Comrat district, Gagauz Autonomous Territorial Unit of the Republic of Moldova. According to the 2024 Moldovan census the commune has 1,396 people, 979 (70.12%) of them Gagauz and 319 (22.85%) being Moldovans.

It is composed of three villages:

- Congazcicul de Jos (Gag: Kongazçık Aşaakı)
- Congazcicul de Sus (Gag: Kongazçık Yukarkı)
- Dudulești (Gag: Duduleşt)

== History ==
The oldest village in the commune is Dudulesti, founded by Moldovan migrants from Borogani in 1902. Congazcicul de Jos was founded in 1905 and Congazcicul de Sus in 1921, both by migrants from Congaz. The name Kongazçık came from the diminutive form of Kongaz with the addition of "çık" which in Gagauz means to "go out".
