= Copceac, Gagauzia =

Copceac Kıpçak
- Commune
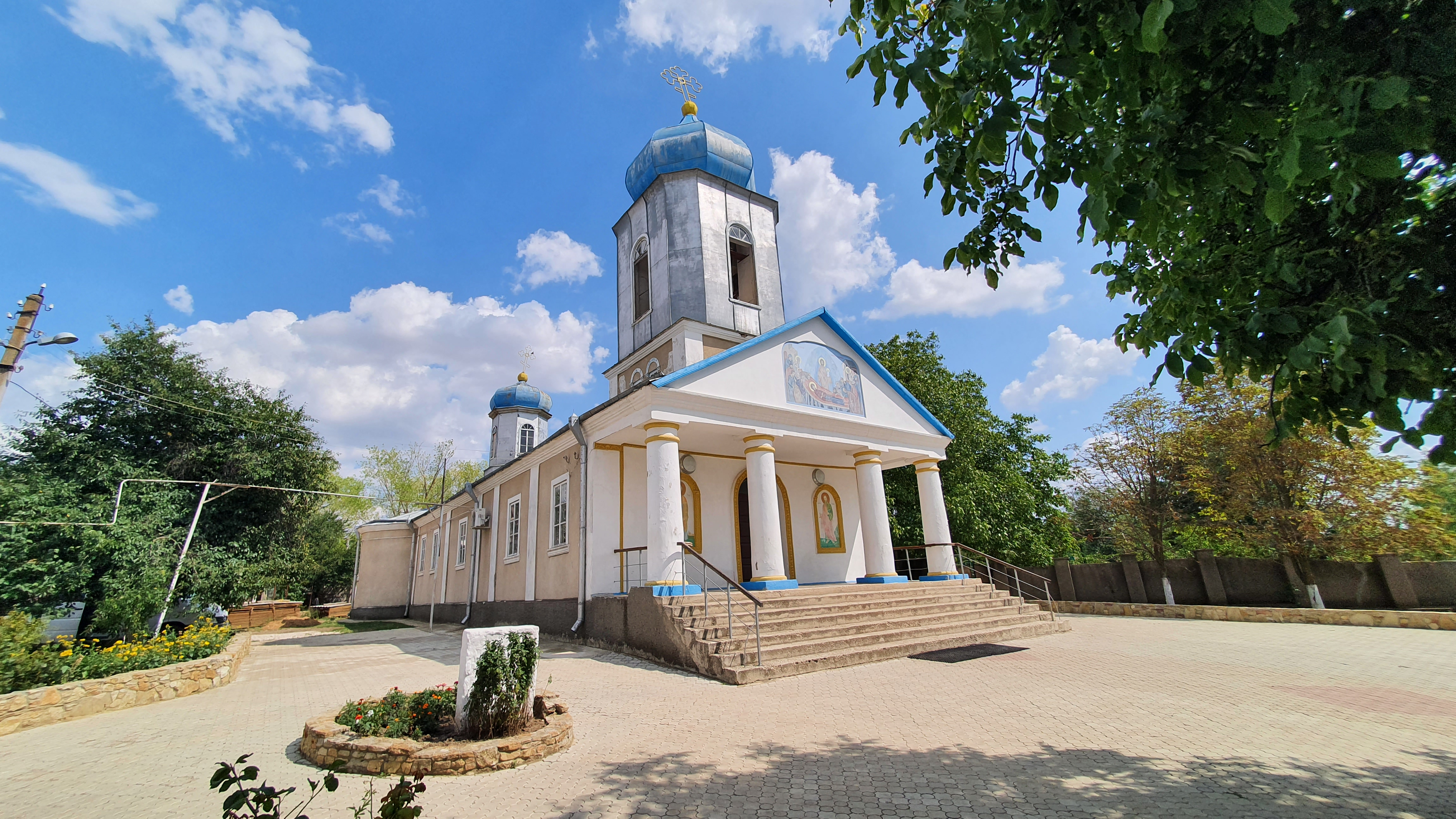
- Church of the Assumption in Copceac

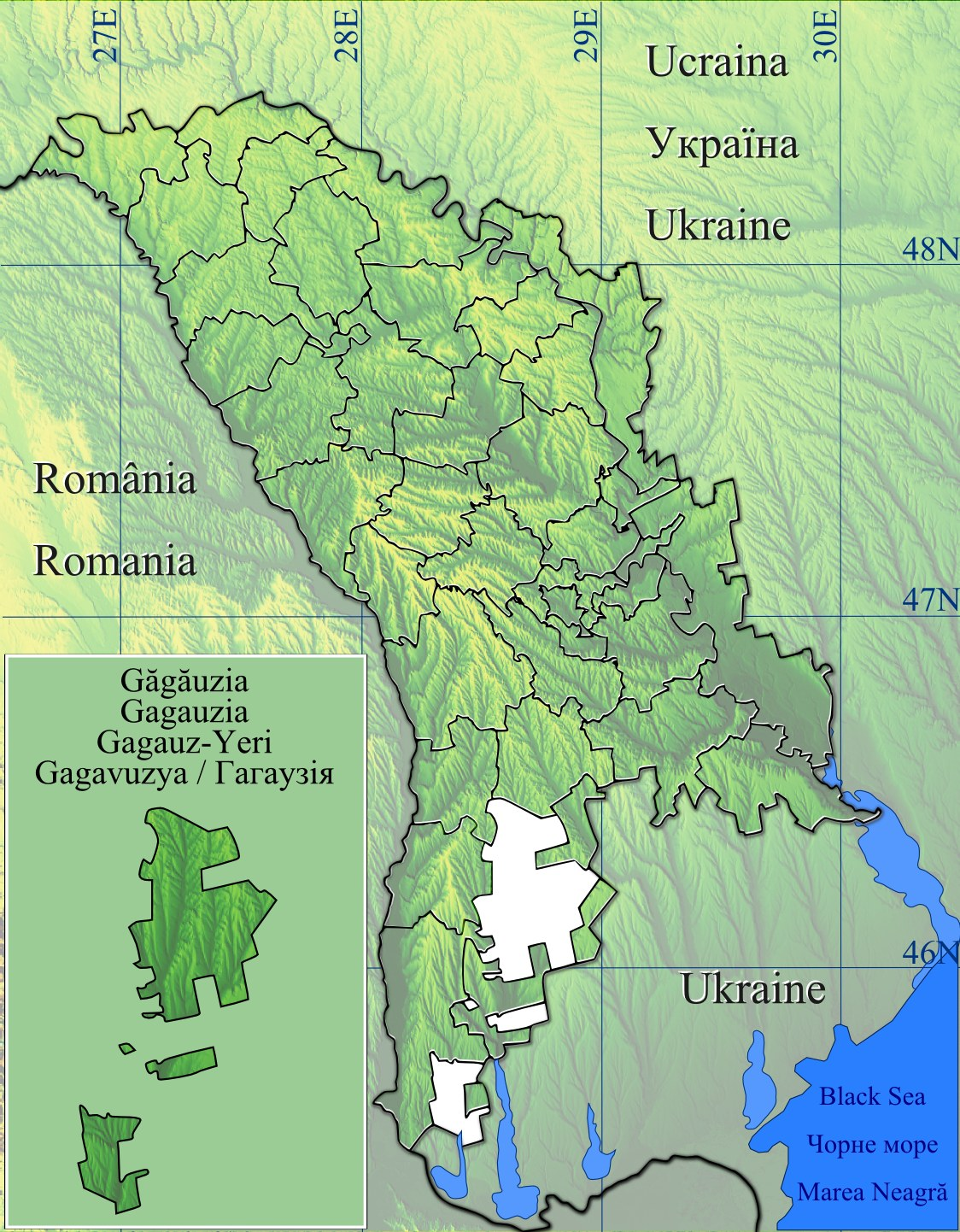
- Location of Copceac in Moldova
- Coordinates: 45°51′00″N 28°41′40″E
- Country: Moldova
- Autonomous Region: Gagauzia
- Founded: 1812

Government
  - Mayor: Oleg Garizan

Population (2024)
  - Total: 2,538

Ethnicity (2024 census)
  - Gagauz people: 94.66%
  - Bulgarians: 2.34%
  - other: 3%
- Time zone: UTC+2 (EET)
- Climate: Cfb
- Website: copceac.md

Copceac (Gagauz: Kıpçak) is an enclave, commune and village in the Ceadîr-Lunga district, Gagauz Autonomous Territorial Unit of the Republic of Moldova. According to the 2024 Moldovan census It is also the second largest commune in Gagauzia after Congaz with a population of 6,434 people, 6,091 (94.66%) of them being Gagauz.

Copceac is unofficially divided that runs through the village into two parts: Tashlyk (Gagauz: Taşlık) in the north and Copceac (Gagauz: Kıpçak) in the south.

== International relations ==
=== Twin towns — Sister cities ===
Copceac is twinned with:

- Morphou, Cyprus;
- Tokmok, Kyrgyzstan;
- General Kantardzhievo, Bulgaria;

== Notable people ==
- Vladislav Baboglo (born 1998), Moldovan-Ukrainian footballer
- Gleb Drăgan (1920–2014), Romanian engineer and academic
- Gheorghe Tabunșcic (born 1939), Moldovan politician

== Sports ==
The Moldovan Liga 2 football club Socol Copceac is based in the commune.
