= Ludmila Tukan =

Ludmila Tukan Liudmila Tukan
- Born: 1982 (age 43–44); Ceadîr-Lunga, Gagauzia
- Genres: Pop
- Years active: 1998–present

Ludmila Tukan (Gagauz: Lüdmila Tukan; Romanian: Liudmila Tukan; born 1982) is a Gagauzian singer from Moldova. She was the debut representative for Gagauzia in the Turkvision Song Contest in 2013.

== Biography ==
Tukan was born in 1982 in Ceadîr-Lunga. Her musical career began in 1998, when she won the Grand Prize in a music contest in Gagauzia. In 2008 and 2011, she participated in the finals of the Yalta Eastern Music Festival. Later in 2011, she took first place at the Odesa International Song and Dance Festival, beating over 150 contestants.

In 2013, she was selected to represent Gagauzia in the territory's debut at the Turkvision Song Contest, with the song Вернись любовь ("Come back love"). In 2015, she won the first prize at the Cântă Inima Festival in Anenii Noi. She has been awarded the status Honoured Artist of Gagauzia.
