= Cotovscoe =

Cotovscoe Kırlannar
- Commune
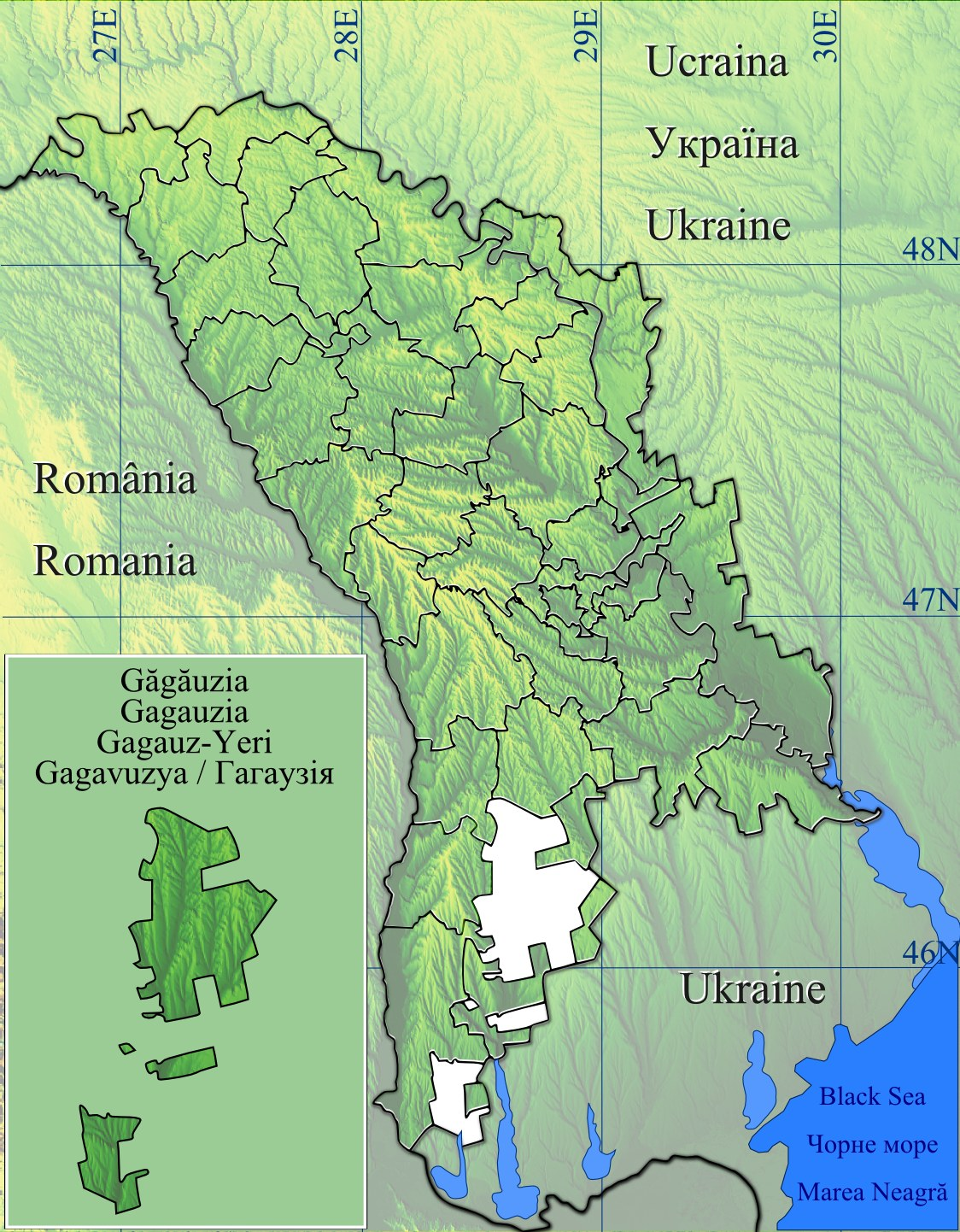
- Location of Cotovscoe in Moldova
- Coordinates: 46°09′46″N 28°30′50″E
- Country: Moldova
- Autonomous Region: Gagauzia
- Founded: 1924

Government
  - Mayor: Georgii Palic (PSRM)

Population (2024)
  - Total: 669

Ethnicity (2024 census)
  - Gagauz people: 89.68%
  - Moldovans: 3.73%
  - other: 6.59%
- Time zone: UTC+2 (EET)
- Climate: Cfb

Cotovscoe (Gagauz: Kırlannar) is a commune and village in the Comrat district, Gagauz Autonomous Territorial Unit of the Republic of Moldova. According to the 2024 Moldovan census the commune has 669 people, 600 (89.68%) of them being Gagauz.

== History ==
The village was founded in 1924, under the name “Kırlannar”, coming from "kirda iaşannar" meaning "inhabitants of the field" in the Gagauz language. After Soviet annexation in 1950, the village was renamed Cotovscoe.

== International relations ==
=== Twin towns — Sister cities ===
Cotovscoe is twinned with:

- Feke, Turkey;
