= Baurci =

Baurci Baurçu
- Commune
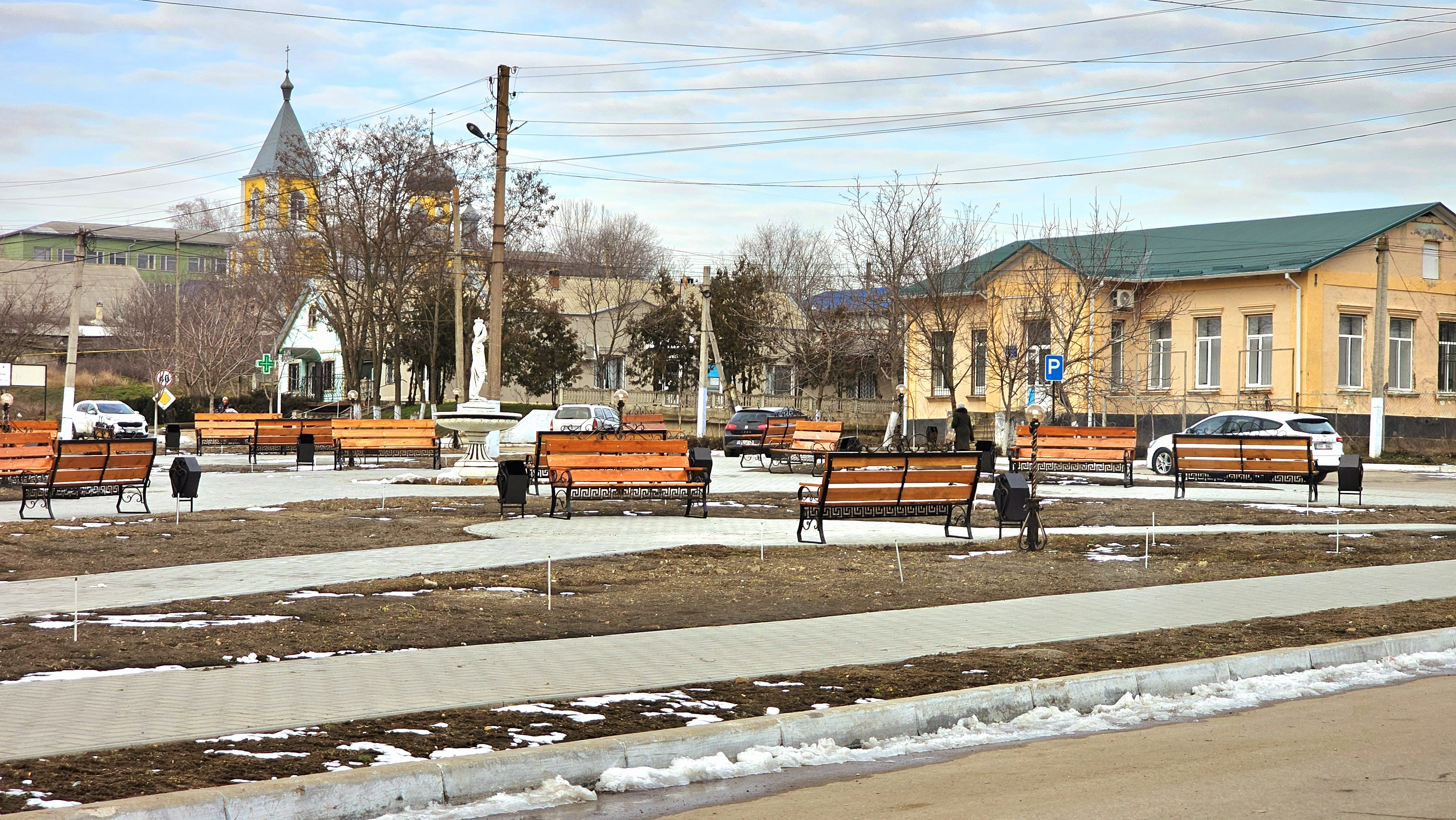
- Baurci central park

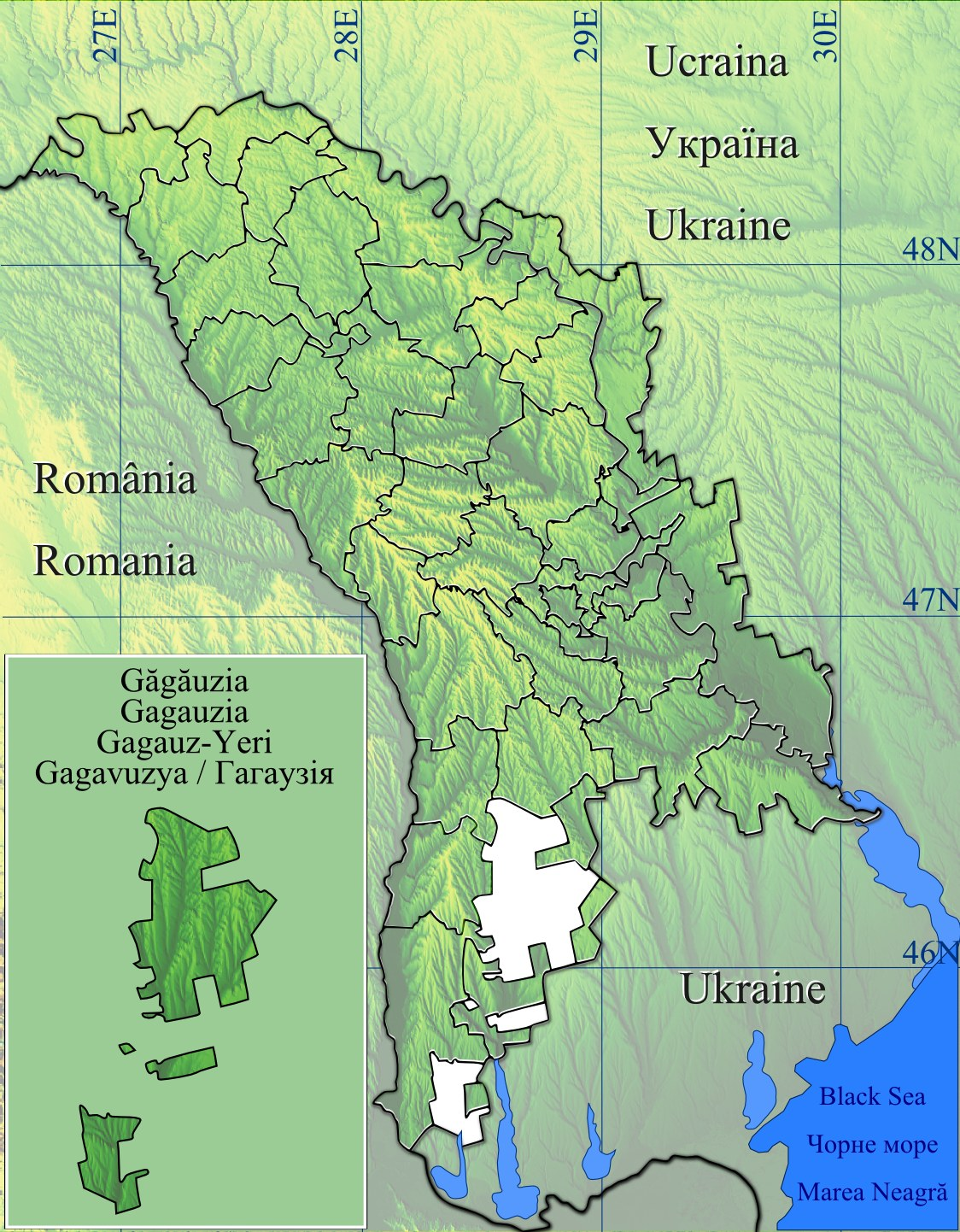
- Location of Baurci in Moldova
- Coordinates: 46°05′46″N 28°40′30″E
- Country: Moldova
- Autonomous Region: Gagauzia
- Founded: 1812

Government
  - Mayor: Sergey Tukan

Population (2024)
  - Total: 3,942

Ethnicity (2024 census)
  - Gagauz people: 96.87%
  - Russians: 0.98%
  - other: 2.15%
- Time zone: UTC+2 (EET)
- Climate: Cfb
- Website: baurci.md

Baurci (Gagauz: Baurçu) is a commune and village in the Ceadîr-Lunga district, Gagauz Autonomous Territorial Unit of the Republic of Moldova. According to the 2024 Moldovan census the commune has 3,942 people, 3,819 (96.87%) of them being Gagauz.

== History ==
The name “Baurçu” is thought to have come from the Tatars and Nogais who settled the area. In Tatar, the word means rich or happy.

In 1812 around 57 Gagauz families settled the village, which grew to 166 families by 1844.
