= Avdarma =

- Commune
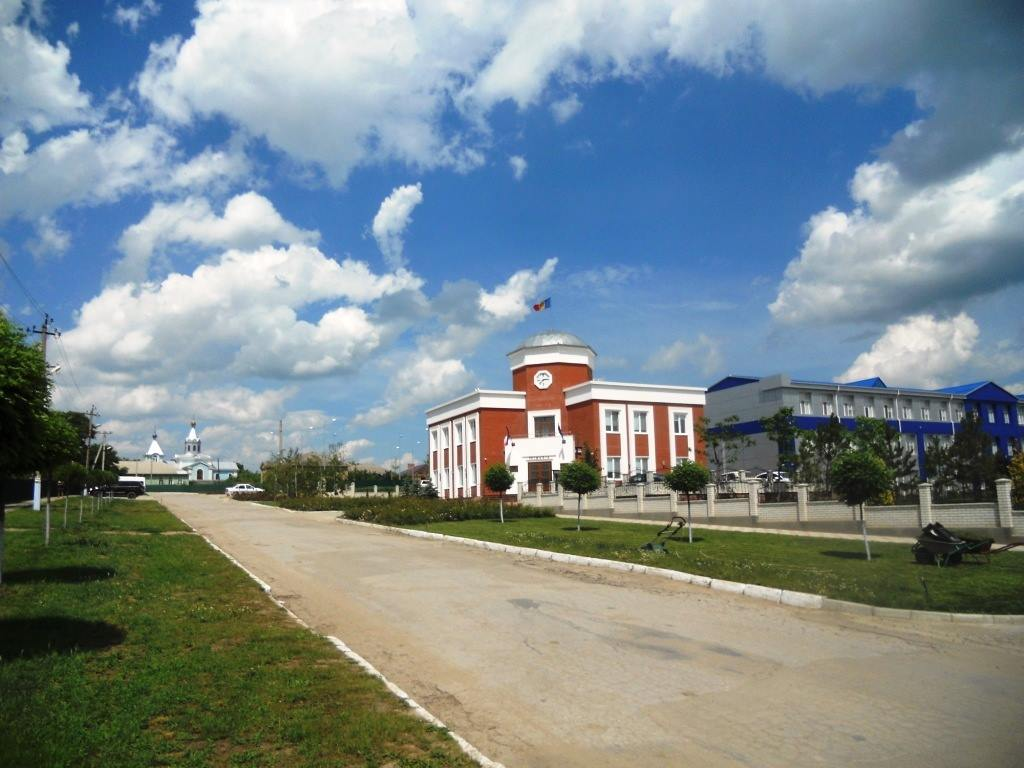
- Avdarma commune center

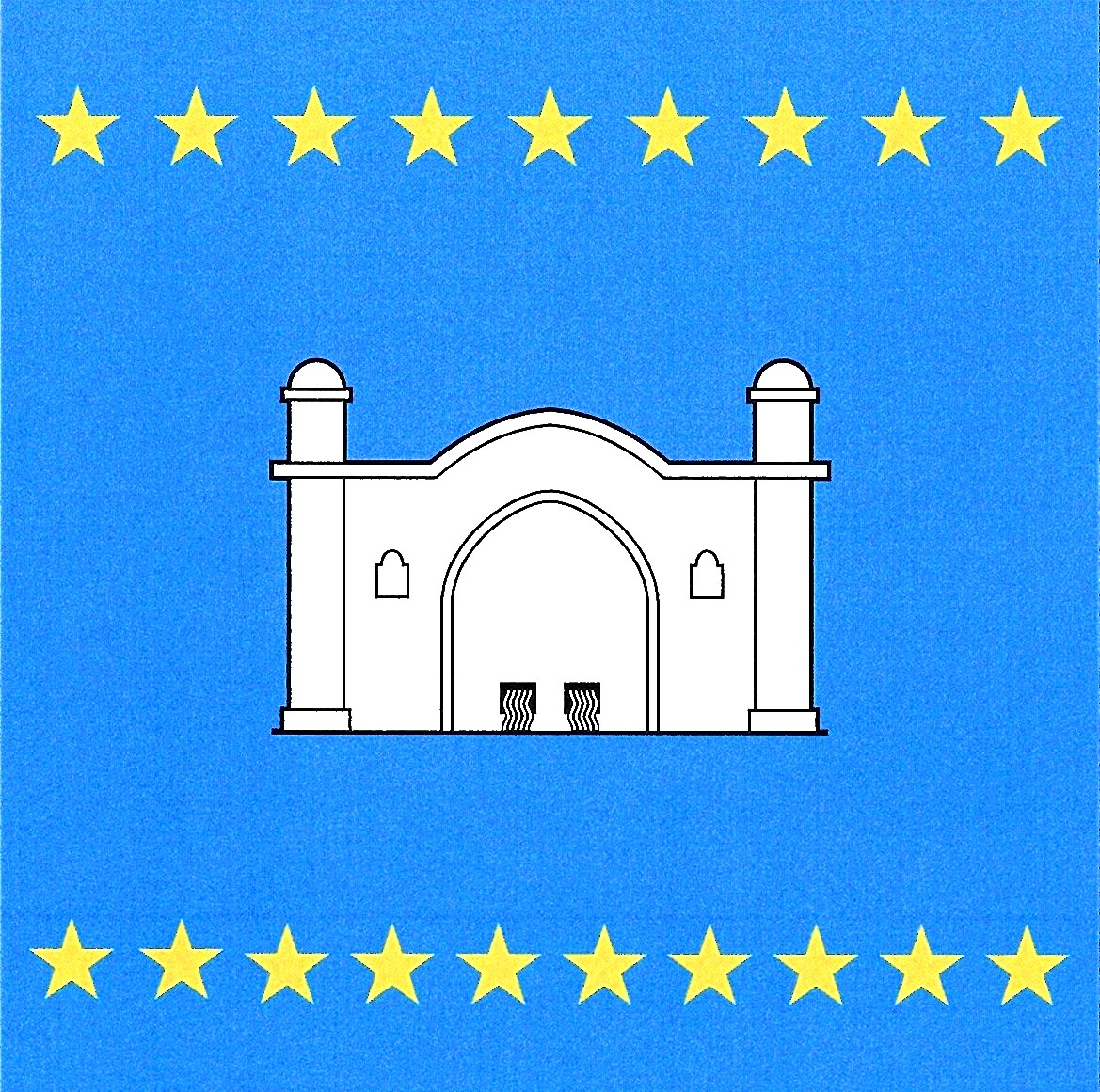
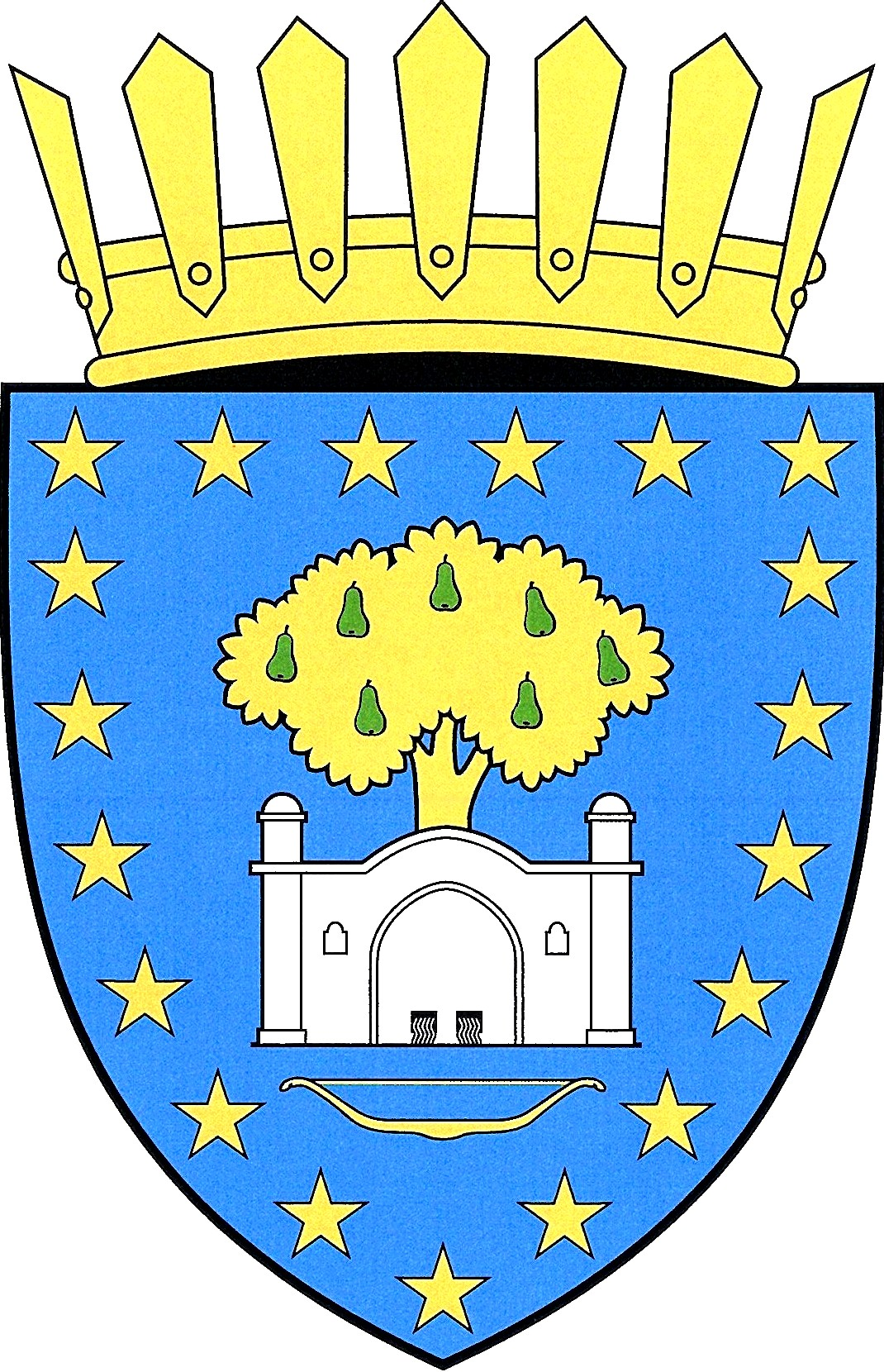
- Flag Seal

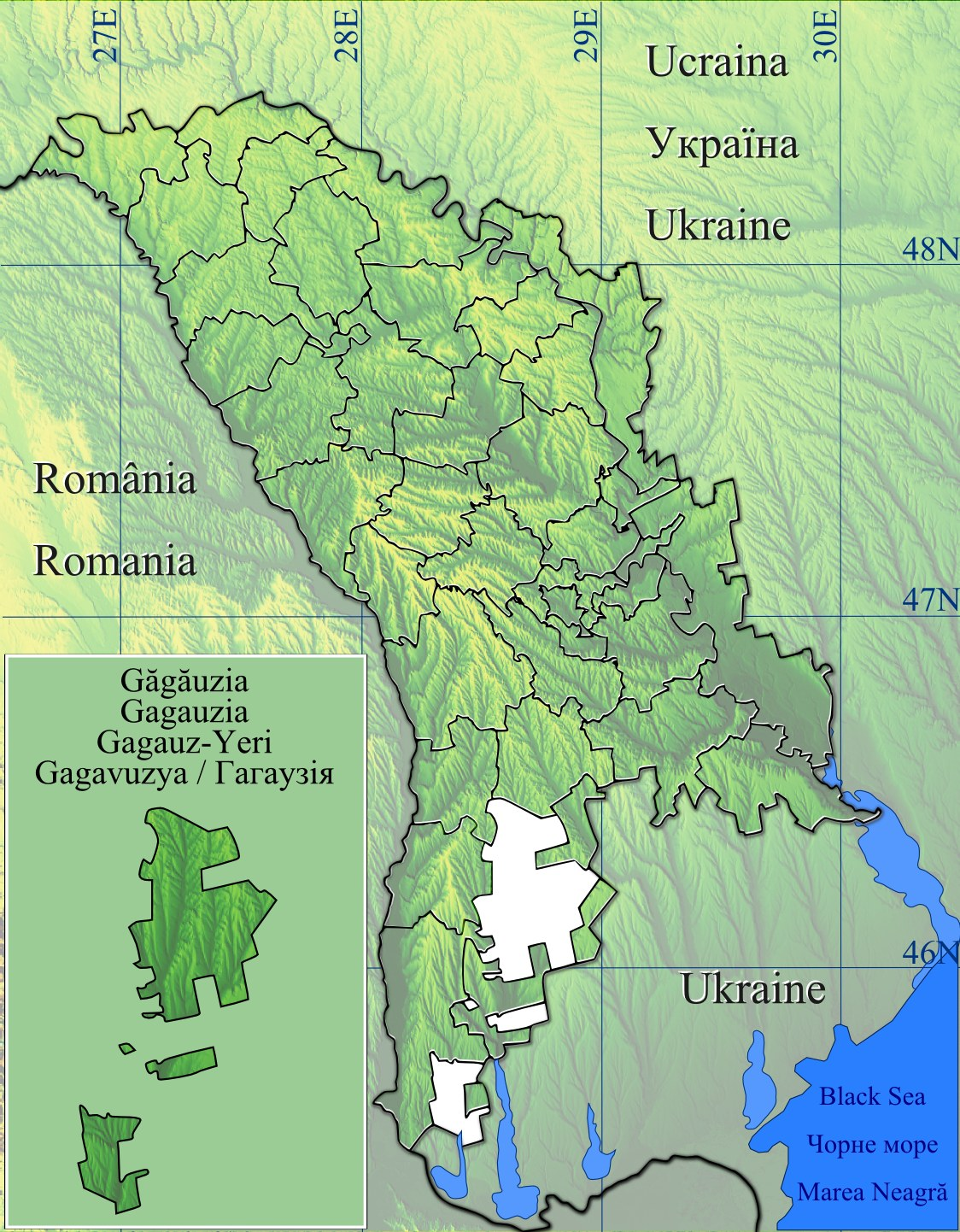
- Location of Avdarma in Moldova
- Coordinates: 46°15′5″N 28°50′20″E
- Country: Moldova
- Autonomous Region: Gagauzia
- First mentioned: 1563

Government
  - Mayor: Ivan Kasym

Population (2024)
  - Total: 2,437

Ethnicity (2024 census)
  - Gagauz people: 93.18%
  - Moldovans: 2.33%
  - other: 4.49%
- Time zone: UTC+2 (EET)
- Climate: Cfb
- Website: avdarmaprimaria.md

Avdarma (Gagauz: Avdarma) is a commune and village in the Comrat district, Gagauz Autonomous Territorial Unit of the Republic of Moldova. According to the 2024 Moldovan census the commune has 2,437 people, 2,271 (93.18%) of them being Gagauz.

== History ==
The village was founded by the Gagauz in the 16th century and was first mentioned in 1563. The name of the commune in the Gagauz language means to lurk or to hunt.

From 1812 to 1820, several Bulgarian families from southern Bulgaria and Moldovans settled moved to the village. In 1850 the village was officially privatized, encompassing around 57 km^{2}. By 1850 the village had around 400 households.

In 2011 the Avdarma village history museum was opened, the opening was attended by at the time mayor, Ivan Casîm.
