= Carbalia =

Carbalia Kırbaalı
- Commune
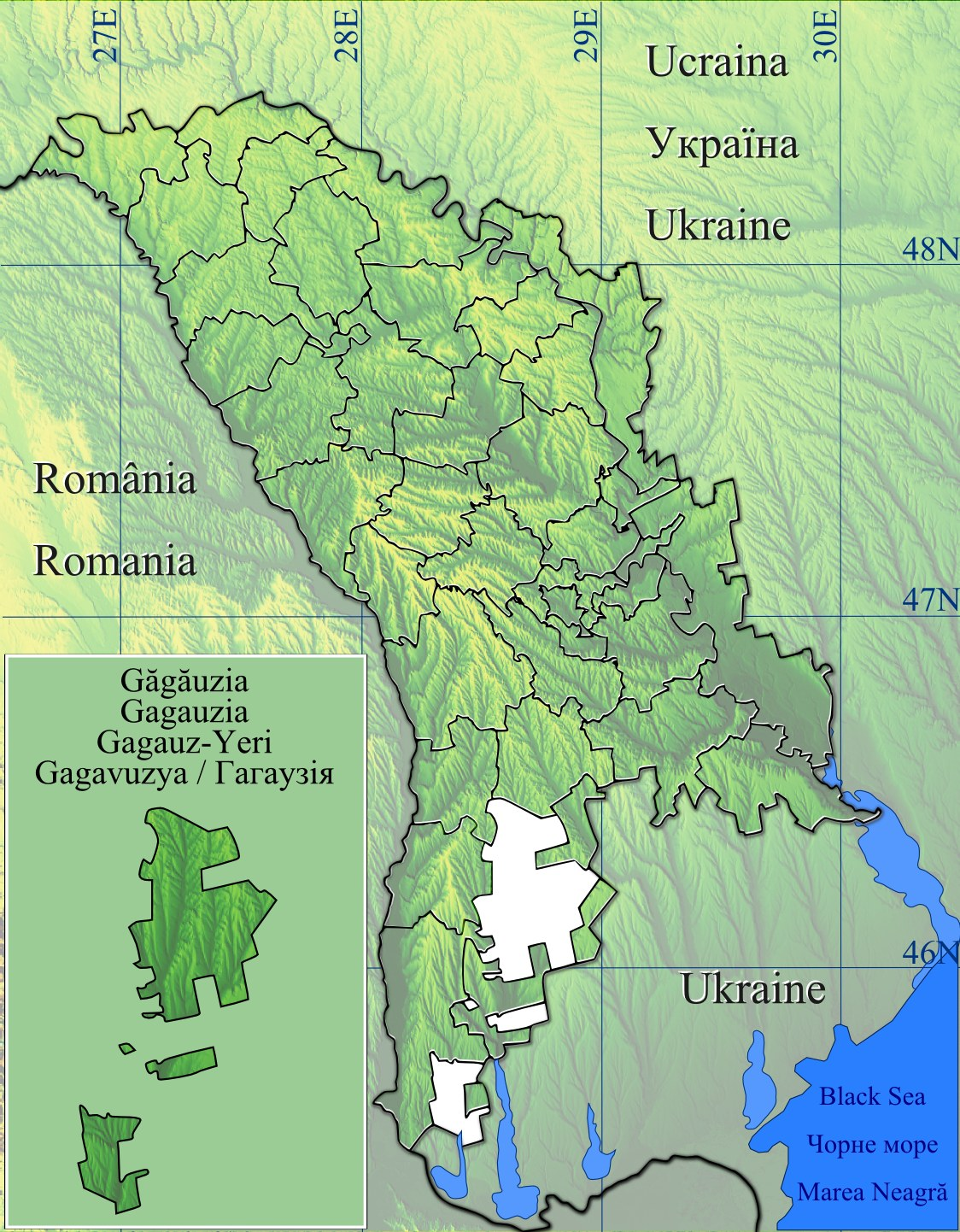
- Location of Carbalia in Moldova
- Coordinates: 45°52′20″N 28°26′54″E
- Country: Moldova
- Autonomous Region: Gagauzia
- First mentioned: 1806

Government
  - Mayor: Tatyana Kyosya

Population (2024)
  - Total: 283

Ethnicity (2024 census)
  - Gagauz people: 61.83%
  - Moldovans: 23.67%
  - other: 14.50%
- Time zone: UTC+2 (EET)
- Climate: Cfb

Carbalia (Gagauz: Kırbaalı) is an exclave, commune and village in the Vulcănești district, Gagauz Autonomous Territorial Unit of the Republic of Moldova. According to the 2024 Moldovan census the commune has 283 people, 175 (61.83%) of them being Gagauz and 67 (23.67%) Moldovans.

== History ==
The etymology of the village is thought to come from the Nogai-Tatar tribe ko'ru'k who lived in the area. After the expulsion of the Nogai-Tatars by the Russian Empire in the 18th century, the area was settled by Gagauz, Bulgarian and Romanian settlers. The first mention of Carbalia is in 1806 and it is officially recorded as Kırbaoglu in the 1816 census. Over time the name was sometimes written as Kurbaul, Kırbaalı, and in 1861, Carbalia.

== Notable people ==
- Gavril Gaydarzhi (1937–1998), Gagauz writer, folklorist and teacher.

== See also ==
- Vulcănești
