= Cișmichioi =

Cișmichioi Çöşmäküü
- Commune
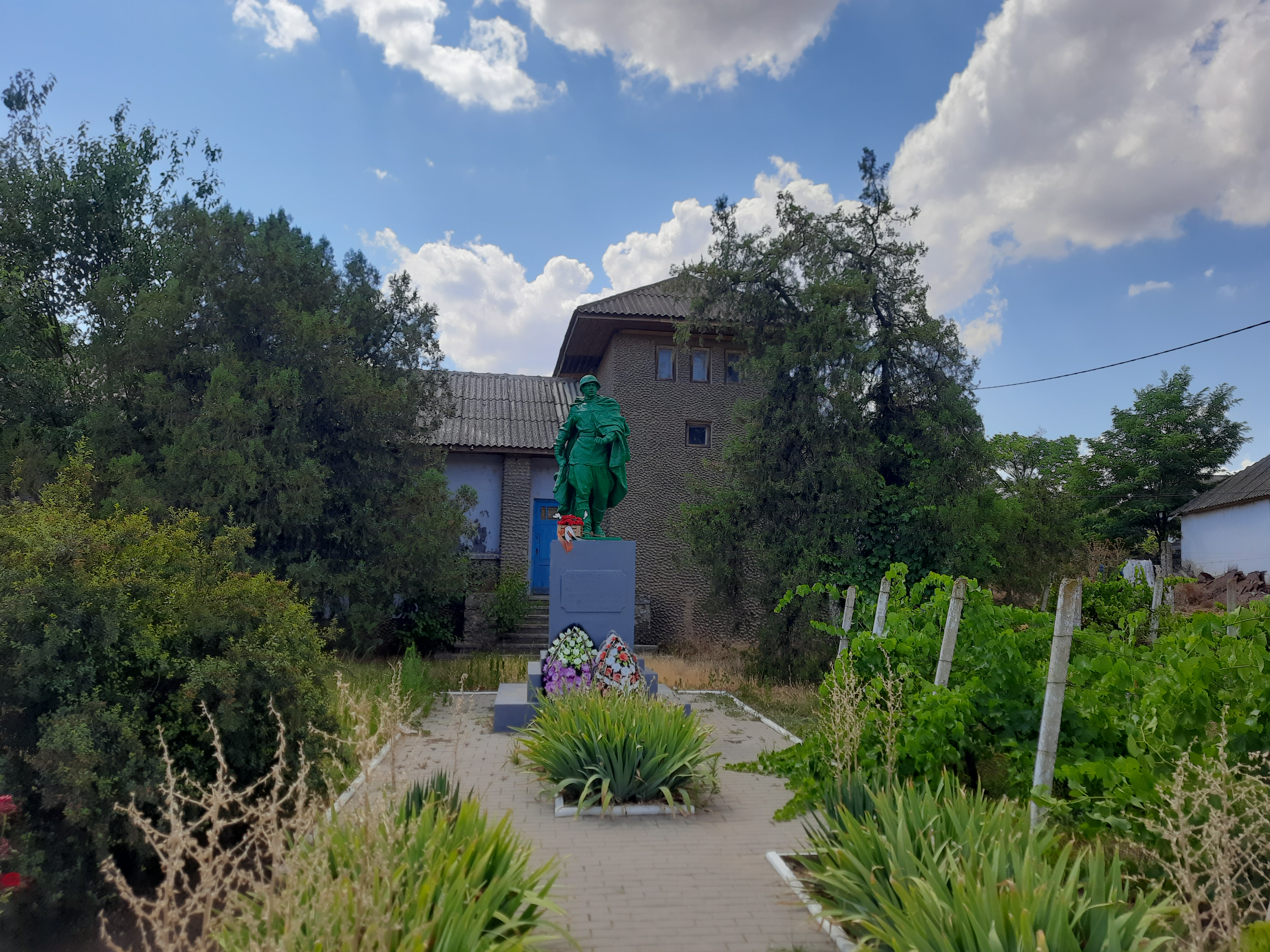
- Cișmichioi WWII monument to the fallen
- Interactive map of Cișmichioi
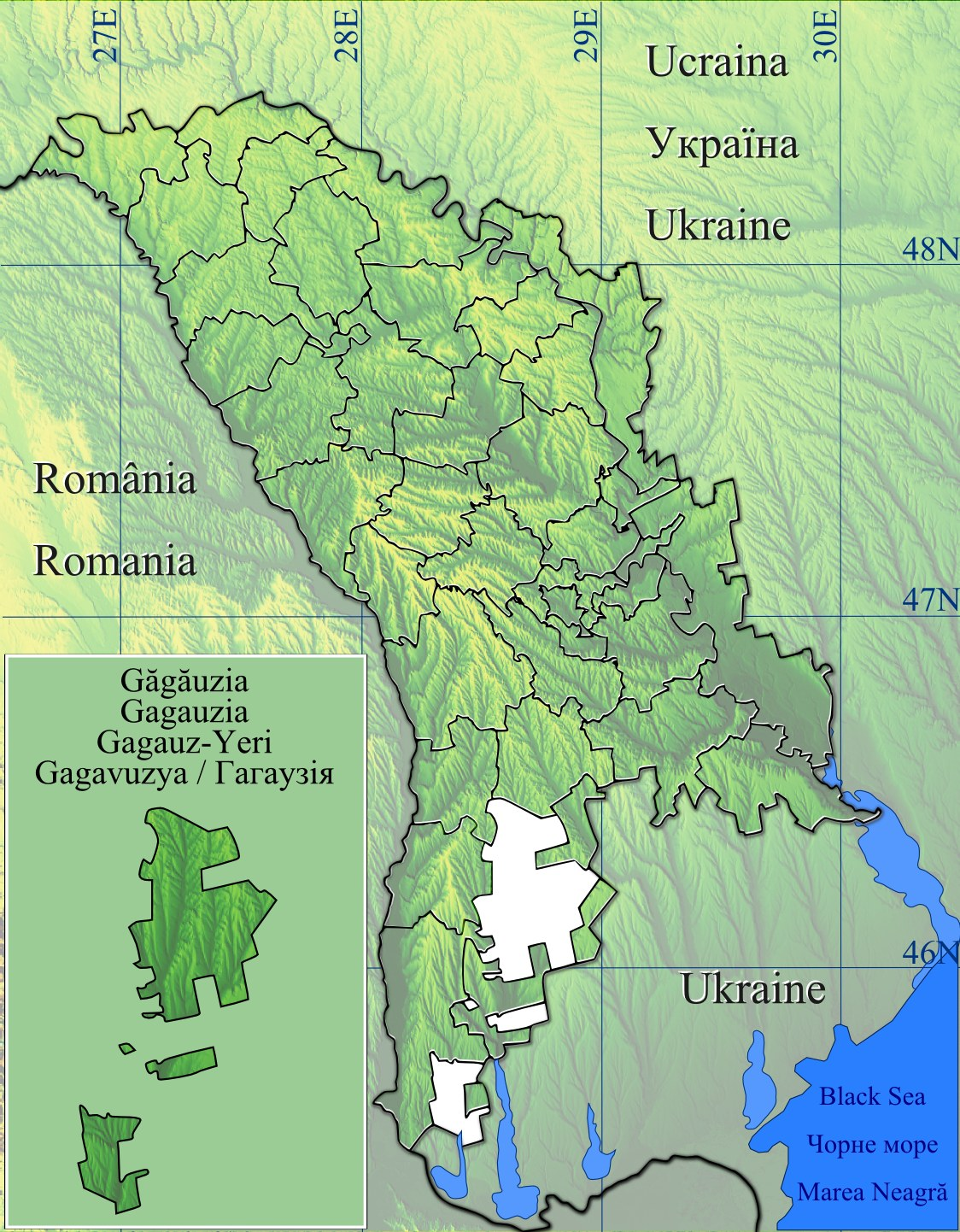
- Location of Cișmichioi in Moldova
- Coordinates: 45°32′50″N 28°22′54″E
- Country: Moldova
- Autonomous Region: Gagauzia
- Founded: 1809

Government
  - Mayor: Pyotr Madzhar (PN)

Population (2024)
  - Total: 3,039

Ethnicity (2024 census)
  - Gagauz people: 93.48%
  - Moldovans: 3.15%
  - other: 3.37%
- Time zone: UTC+2 (EET)
- Climate: Cfb
- Website: cismichioi.md

Cișmichioi (Gagauz: Çöşmäküü) is a village and commune in the Vulcănești district, Gagauz Autonomous Territorial Unit of the Republic of Moldova. According to the 2024 Moldovan census the village has 3,039 people, 2,841 (93.48%) of them being Gagauz and 96 (3.15%) Moldovans.

== History ==
The village was founded in 1809 by Gagauz refugees from the Ottoman Empire. The settlers named the village after a natural spring.

== Geography ==
In the eastern part of the village the Cișmichioi ravine is located, an IUCN Category III geological feature.
