= Bugeac, Gagauzia =

Bugeac Bucak
- Village
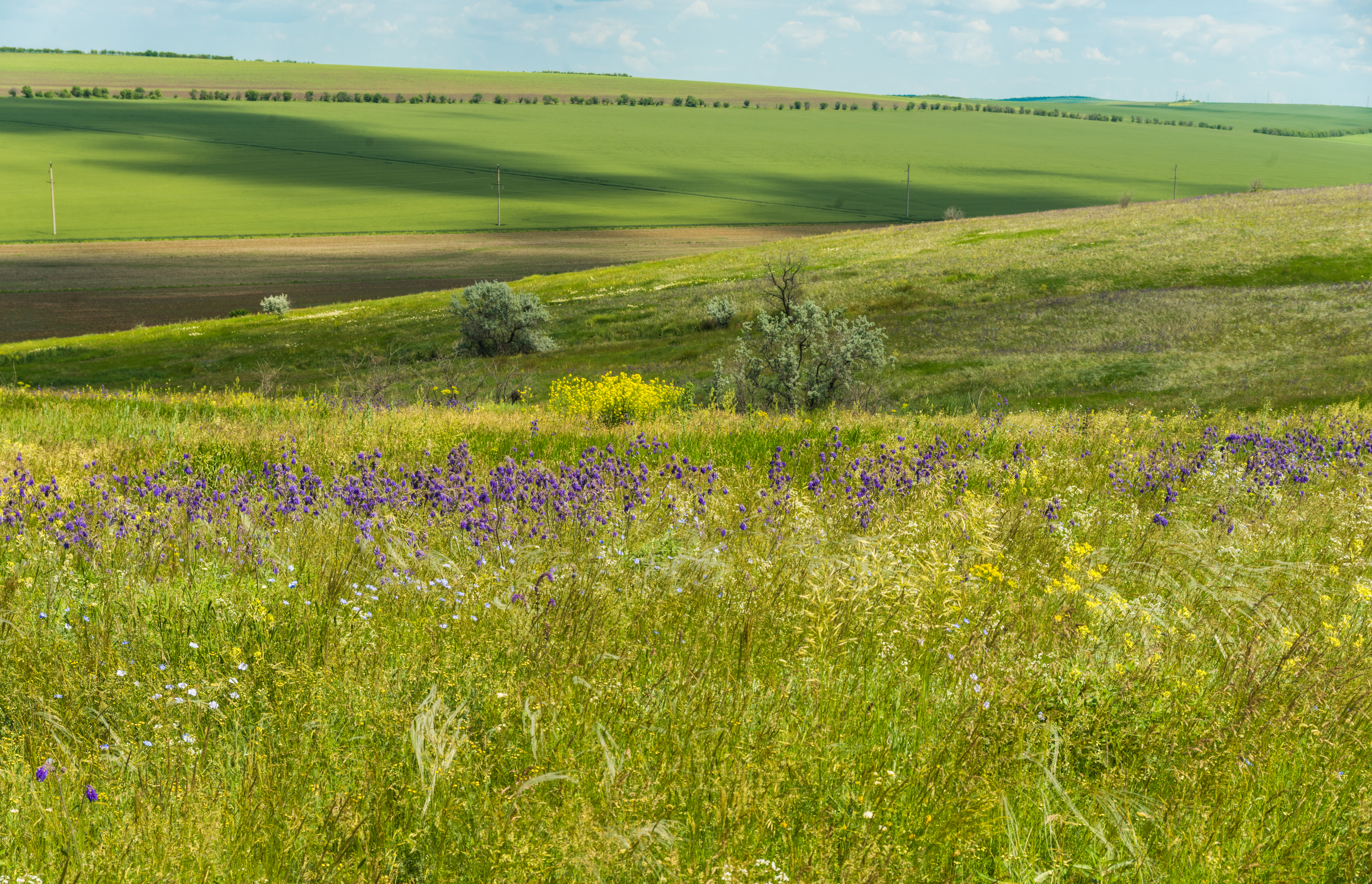
- Bugeac nature reserve

- Flag Seal

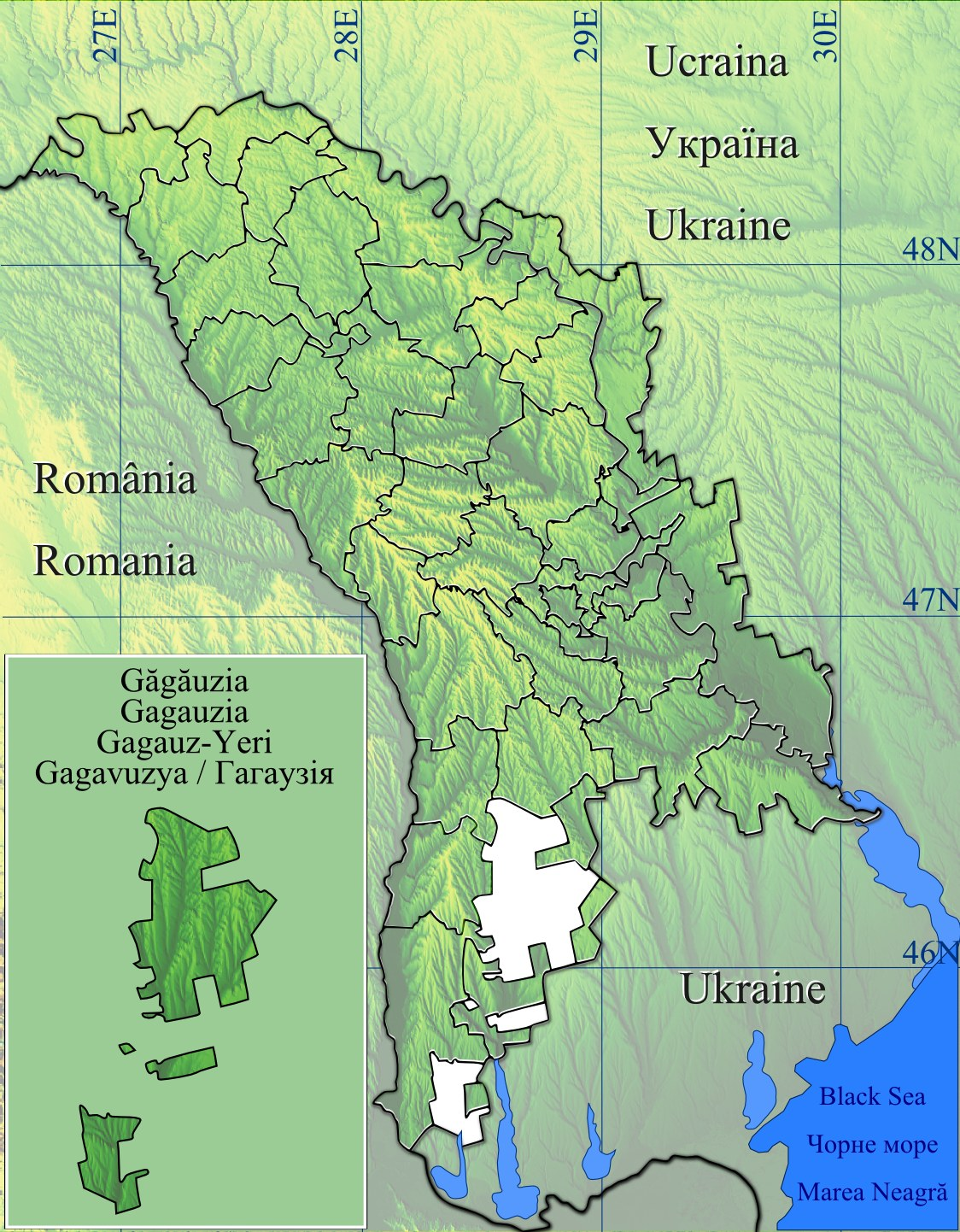
- Location of Bugeac in Moldova
- Coordinates: 46°21′N 28°39′E
- Country: Moldova
- Autonomous Region: Gagauzia
- Founded: 1977

Government
  - Mayor: Nikolai Dudoglo

Population (2024)
  - Total: 1,145

Ethnicity (2024 census)
  - Gagauz people: 57.37%
  - Moldovans: 24.36%
  - Russians: 14.49%
  - other: 3.78%
- Time zone: UTC+2 (EET)
- Climate: Cfb
- Website: bugeac.md

Bugeac (Gagauz: Bucak) is a village in the Comrat district, Gagauz Autonomous Territorial Unit of the Republic of Moldova. According to the 2024 Moldovan census the village has 1,145 people, 657 (57.37%) of them being Gagauz and 279 (24.36%) Moldovans.

== History ==
The Bugeac was founded as a vineyard sovkhoz plant in 1977. On May 31, 1978, according to the decree of the government, it was decided to form it into an urban-type settlement. In independent Moldova, the status of village was given to the settlement.
