= Chirsova =

Chirsova Başküü Кирсово
- Commune
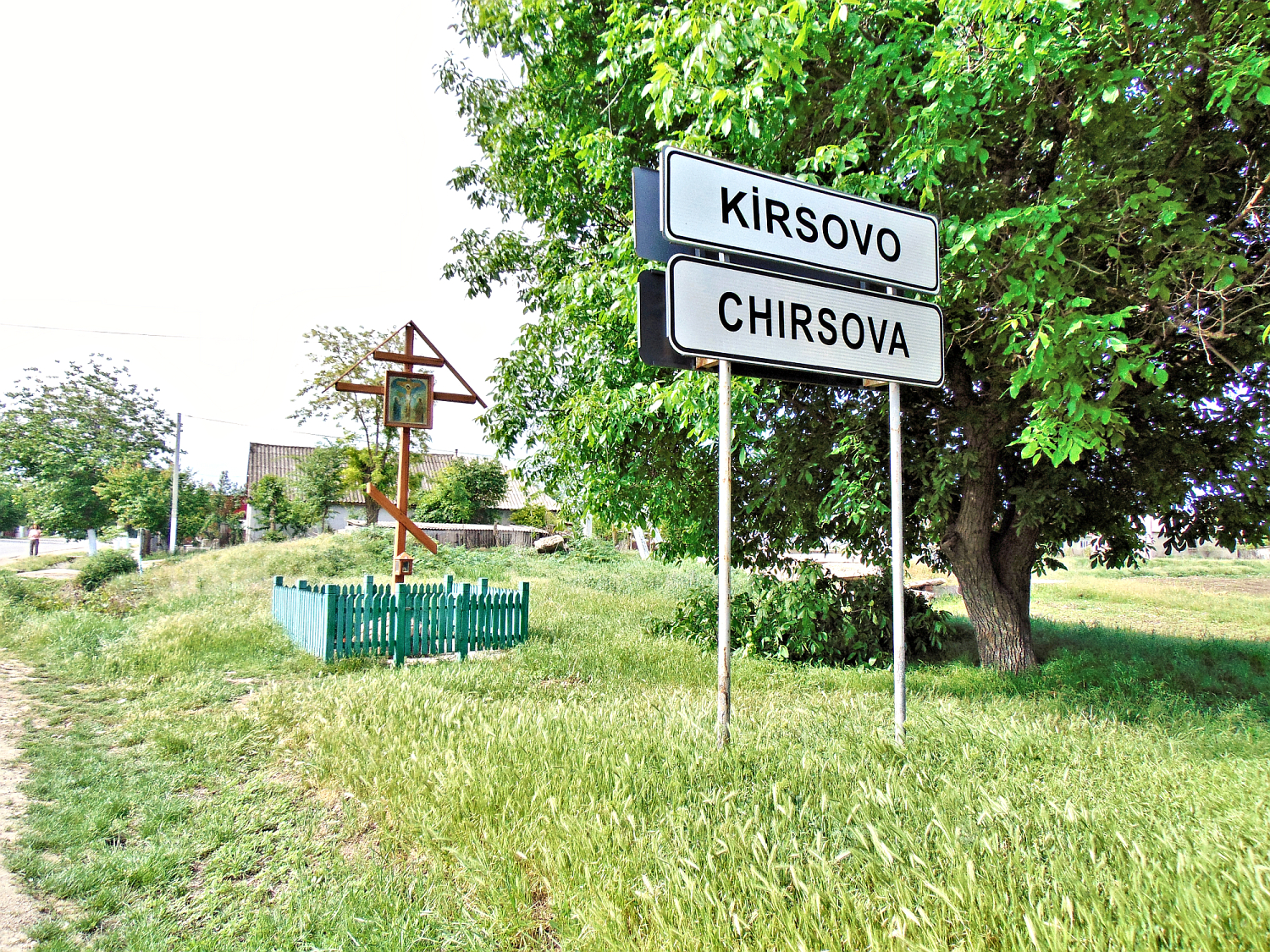
- Multilingual sign in Chirsova

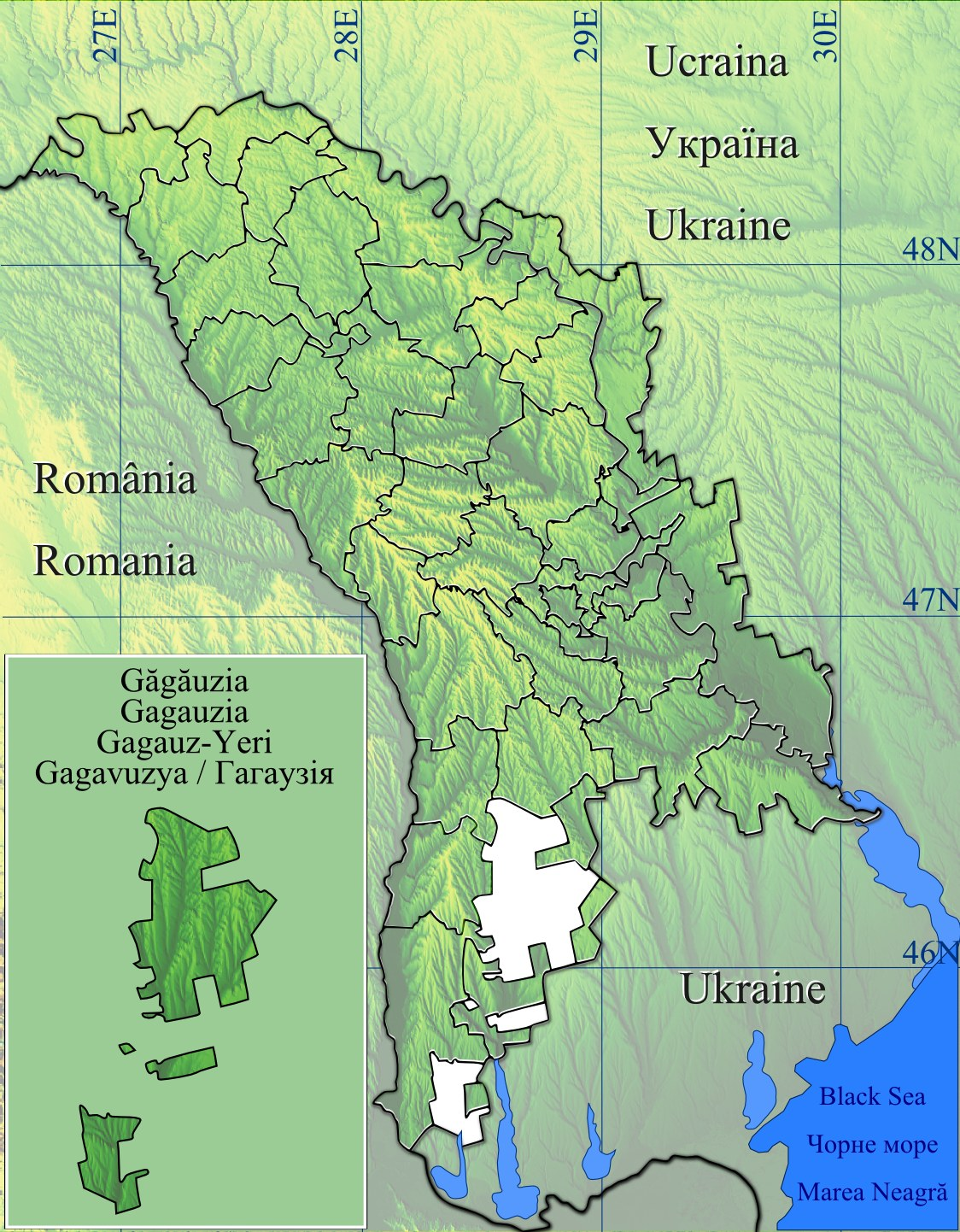
- Location of Chirsova in Moldova
- Coordinates: 46°14′10″N 28°38′48″E
- Country: Moldova
- Autonomous Region: Gagauzia
- Founded: 1811

Government
  - Mayor: Anna Hohlova

Population (2024)
  - Total: 4,774

Ethnicity (2024 census)
  - Gagauz people: 46.10%
  - Bulgarians: 45.47%
  - other: 8.43%
- Time zone: UTC+2 (EET)
- Climate: Cfb

Chirsova (Gagauz: Başküü; Bulgarian: Кирсово, romanized: Kirsovo) is a commune and village in the Comrat district, Gagauz Autonomous Territorial Unit of the Republic of Moldova. According to the 2024 Moldovan census the commune has 4,774 people, 2.201 (46.10%) of them Gagauz and 2,171 (45.47%) being Bulgarians.

== History ==
The village of Chirsova was founded in 1811, mainly consisting of Bulgarians and Gagauz from southern Bulgaria with a small minority of Romanians from: Bârlad, Covurlui and Fălciu. In 1867 a stone church was built, called the Holy Trinity church.

== Sport ==
The football club FC Maiak Chirsova is based in the commune, they play in Moldovan Liga 2, the third tier of Moldovan football.

== International relations ==
=== Twin towns — Sister cities ===
Chirsova is twinned with:

- Valchi Dol, Bulgaria;
- Zheravna, Bulgaria;
- Adana, Turkey;
- Cojuşna, Moldova;
- Feke, Turkey;

== Notable people ==
- Ion Bas (1933–2005), Moldovan singer
- Serghei Gheorghiev (born 1991), Moldovan football player
- Elena Girzhul (born 1979), Transnistrian statesperson
- Ivan Kristioglo (born 1952), former governor of Gagauzia (2002)
- Gheorghe Nicologlo (born 1991), Moldovan football player
- Maria Pashchenko (born 1959), Transnistrian statesperson
- Rodion Sucman (born 1986), Moldovan powerlifter
