= Beșalma =

Beșalma Beşalma
- Commune
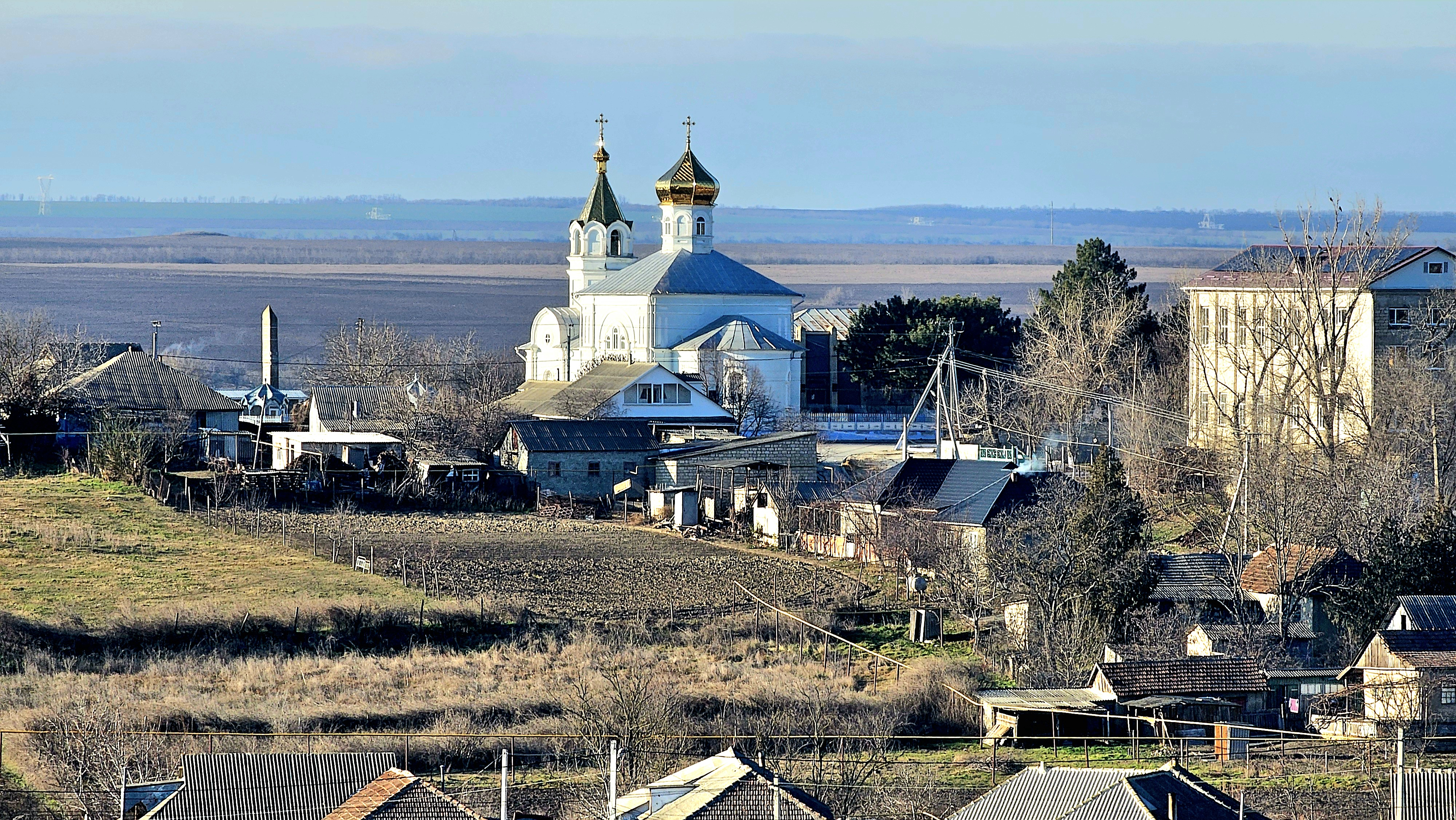
- View of Beșalma, Saint George church

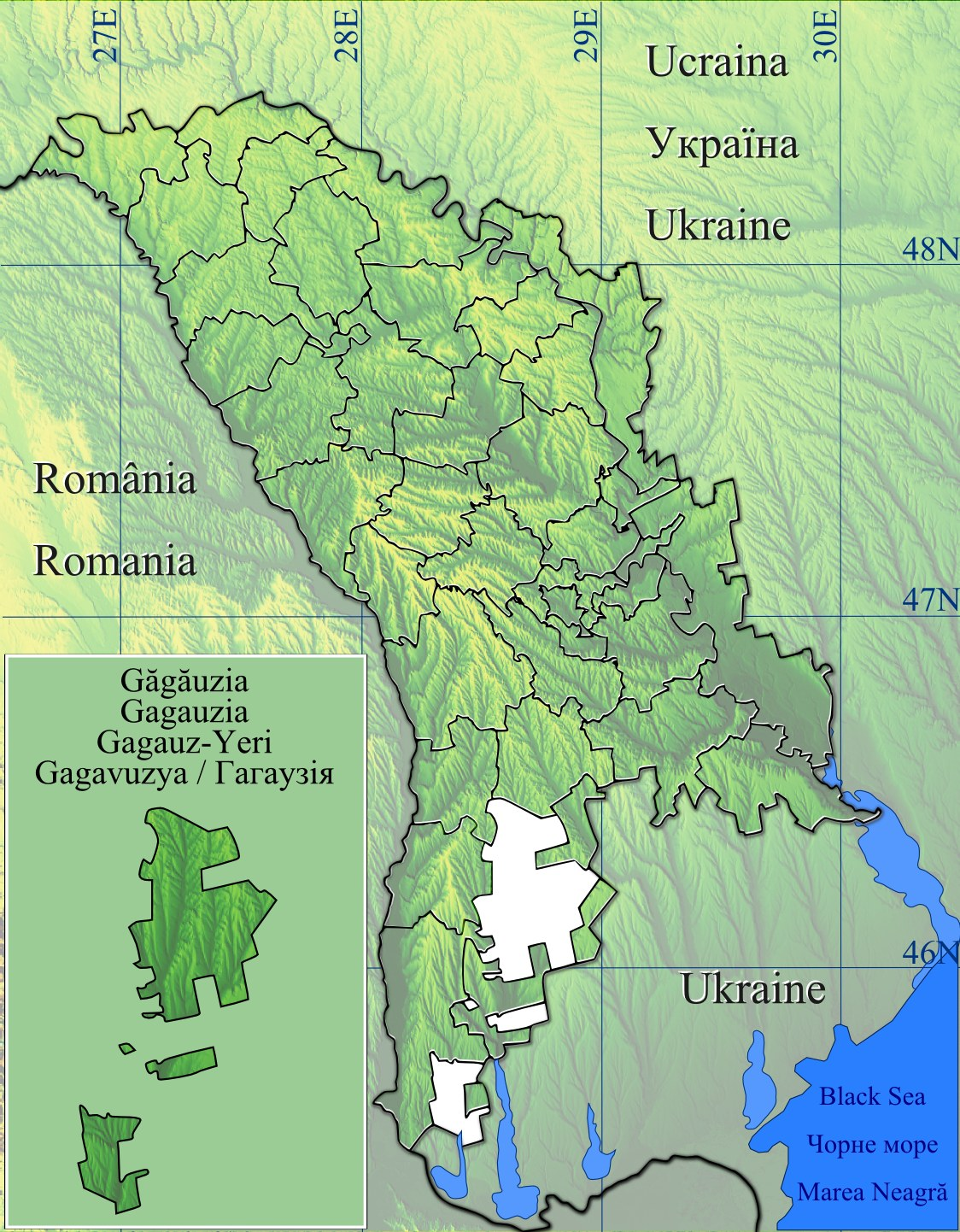
- Location of Beșalma in Moldova
- Coordinates: 46°09′56″N 28°38′55″E
- Country: Moldova
- Autonomous Region: Gagauzia
- Founded: 1791

Government
  - Mayor: Valeriy Mosh

Population (2024)
  - Total: 2,458

Ethnicity (2024 census)
  - Gagauz people: 96.25%
  - Moldovans: 1.50%
  - other: 2.25%
- Time zone: UTC+2 (EET)
- Climate: Cfb

Beșalma (Gagauz: Beşalma) is a commune and village in the Comrat district, Gagauz Autonomous Territorial Unit of the Republic of Moldova. According to the 2024 Moldovan census the commune has 2,458 people, 2,366 (96.25%) of them being Gagauz.

== History ==
The village was founded by Gagauz settlers in 1791. In 1810, the Saint George church was built in the village, and rebuilt in 1880.

== International relations ==
=== Twin towns — Sister cities ===
Chirsova is twinned with:

- Balgarevo, Bulgaria;
- Kapaklı, Turkey;
