= Dezghingea =

Dezghingea Dezgincä
- Commune
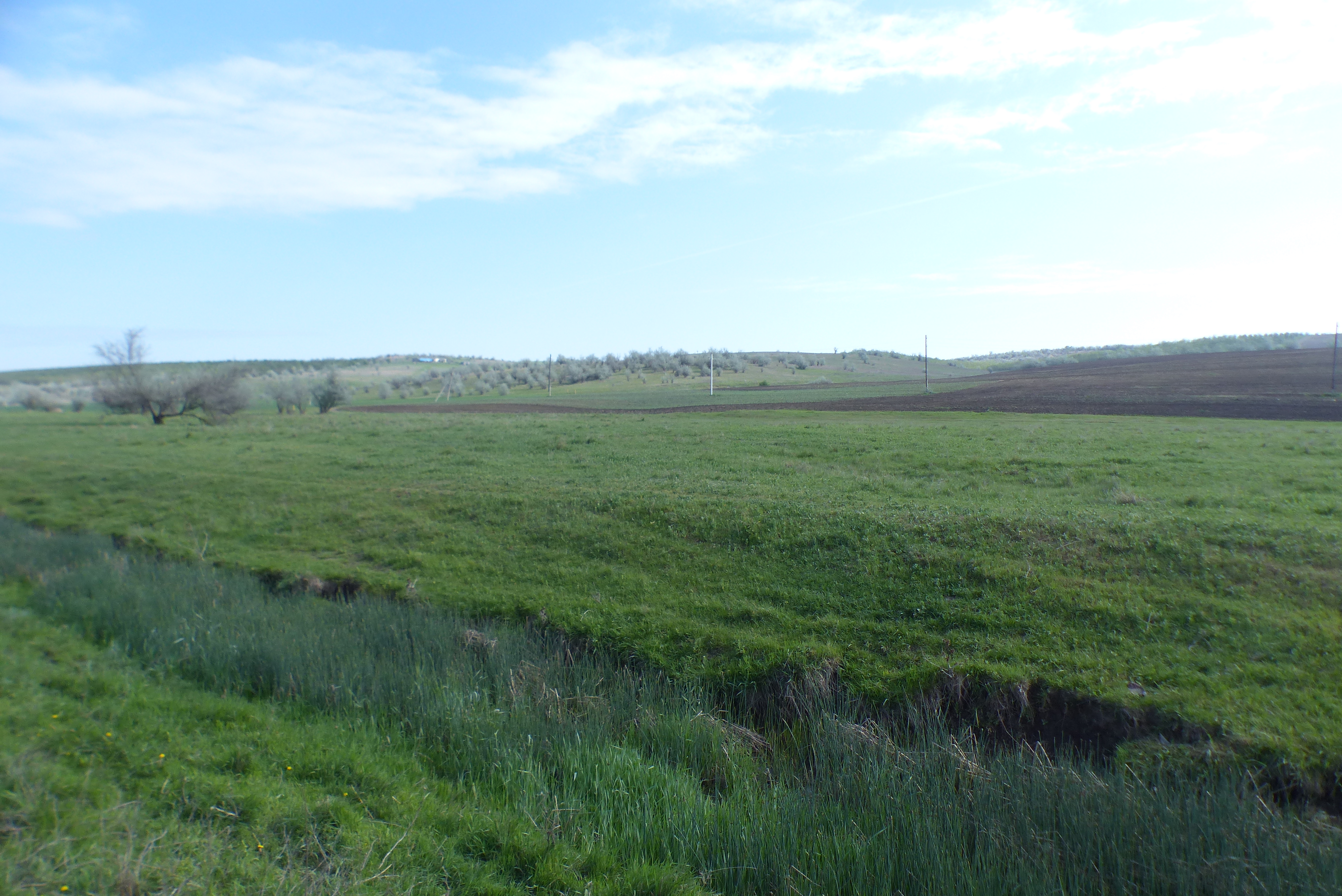
- View from Dezghingea

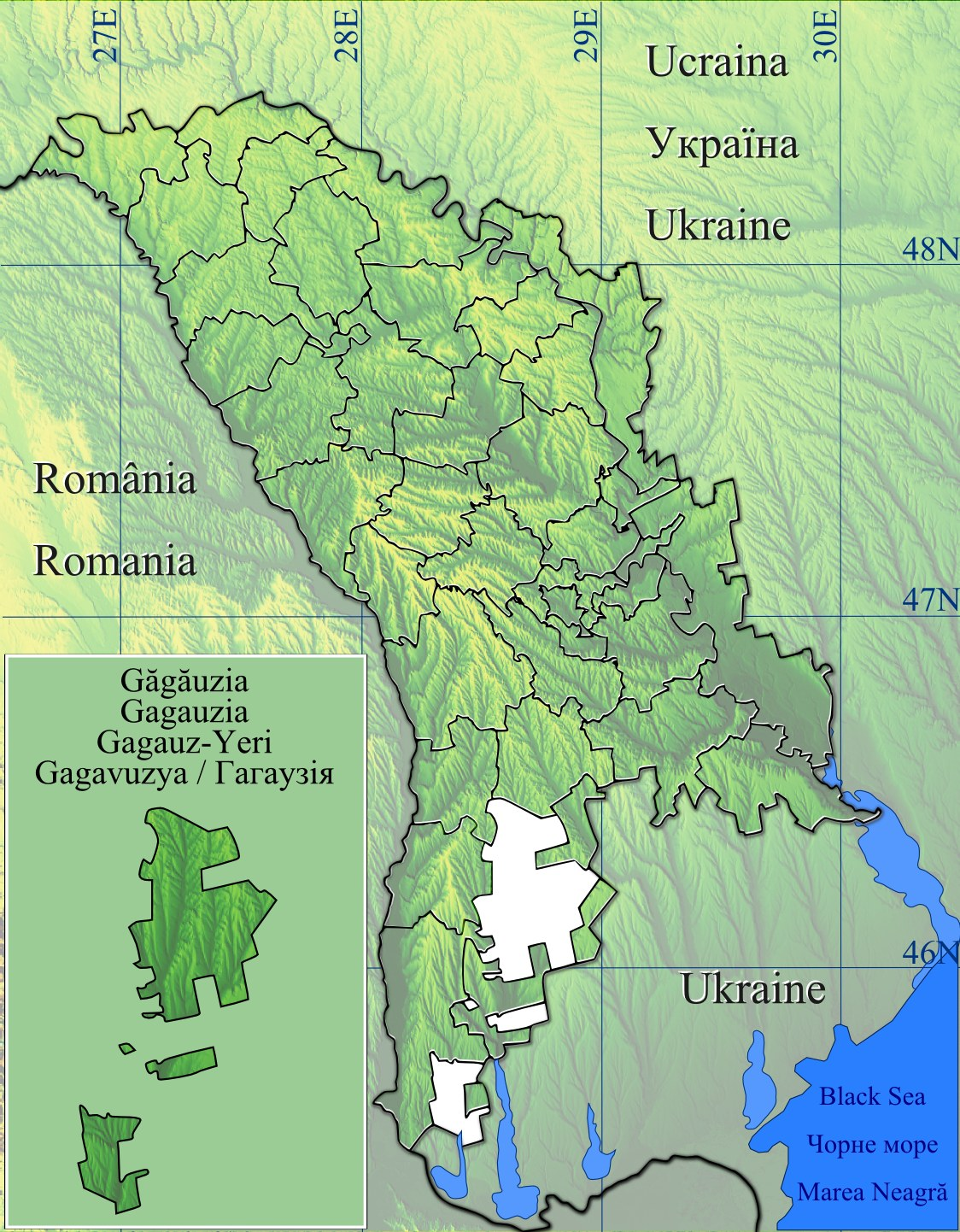
- Location of Dezghingea in Moldova
- Coordinates: 46°25′14″N 28°36′48″E
- Country: Moldova
- Autonomous Region: Gagauzia
- Founded: 1812

Government
  - Mayor: Vasily Capsamun

Population (2024)
  - Total: 3,582

Ethnicity (2024 census)
  - Gagauz people: 93.21%
  - Moldovans: 3.21%
  - other: 3.58%
- Time zone: UTC+2 (EET)
- Climate: Cfb

Dezghingea (Gagauz: Dezgincä) is a commune and village in the Comrat district, Gagauz Autonomous Territorial Unit of the Republic of Moldova. According to the 2024 Moldovan census the commune has 3,582 people, 3,339 (93.21%) of them being Gagauz.

== History ==
The village was founded in 1812, by Bulgarians and Gagaguz from Bulgaria and a small number of Romanians from Cahul county who arrived after 1820. Around 1867–1870 the "Holy Trinity church" was built. The majority of the village are Orthodox with an Adventist minority.
