= Congaz =

Congaz Kongaz
- Commune
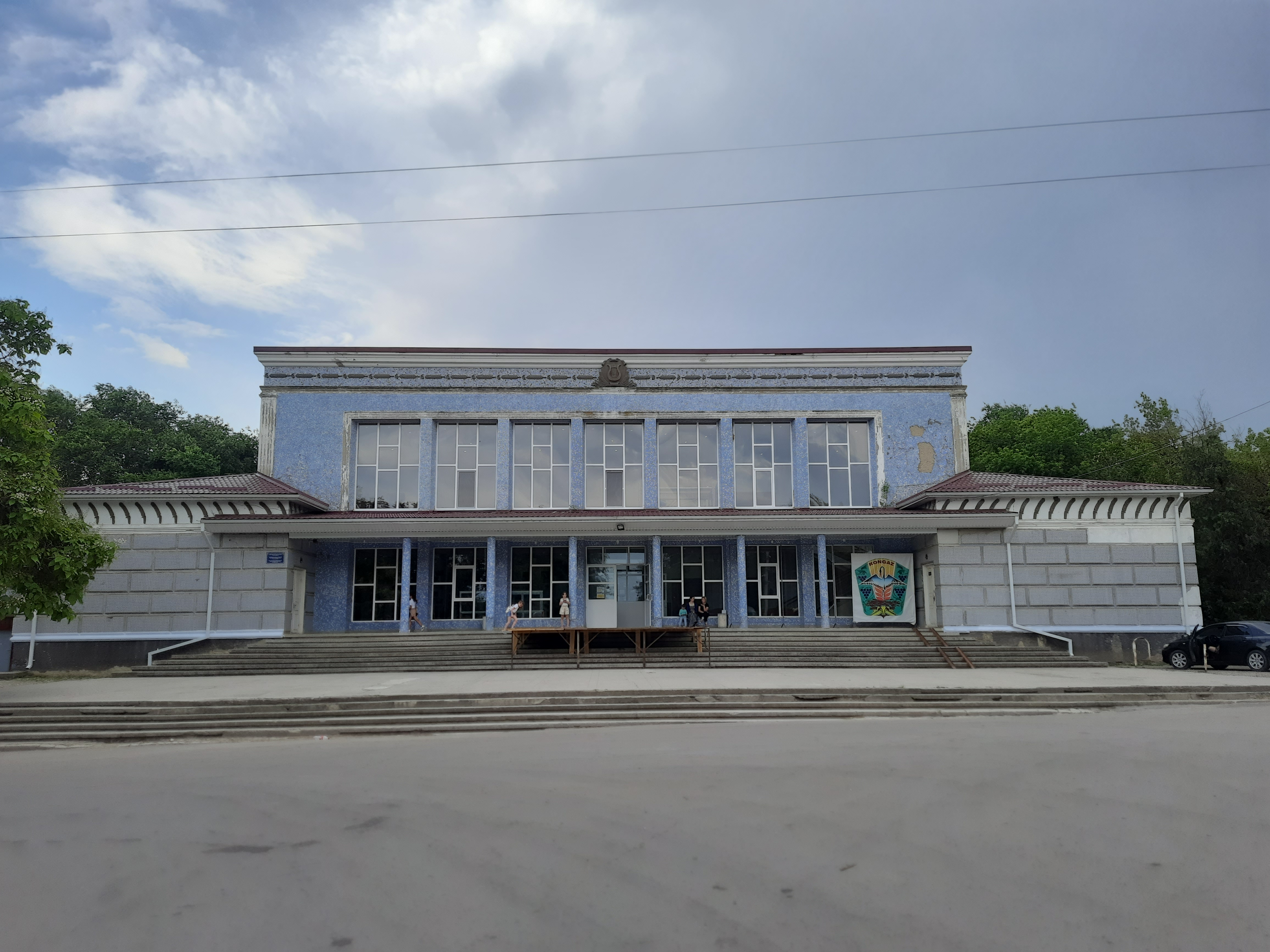
- Congaz House of Culture

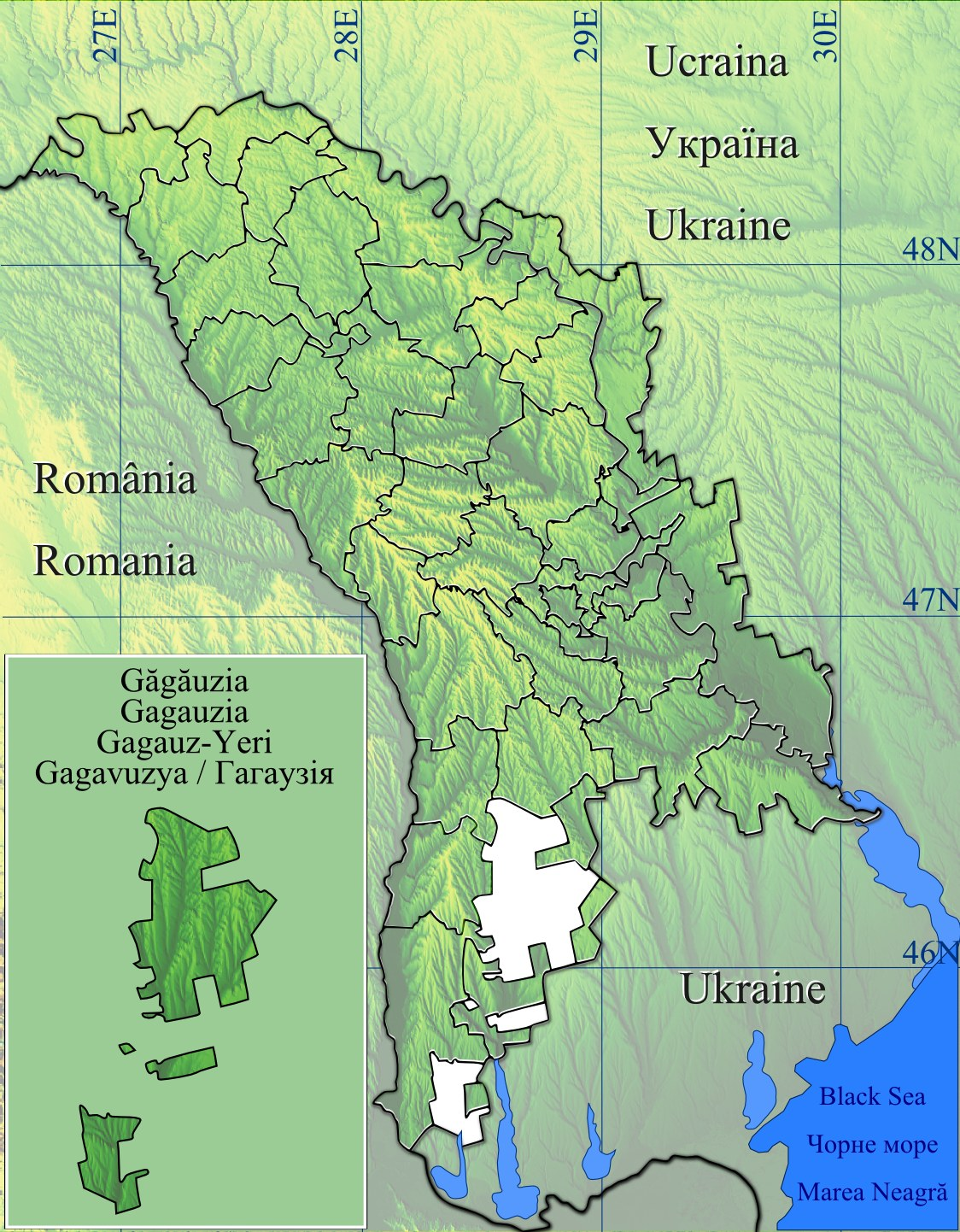
- Location of Congaz in Moldova
- Coordinates: 46°06′30″N 28°35′50″E
- Country: Moldova
- Autonomous Region: Gagauzia
- Founded: 1811

Government
  - Mayor: Yesir Mikhail (Revival party)

Population (2024)
  - Total: 8,269

Ethnicity (2024 census)
  - Gagauz people: 95.44%
  - Moldovans: 1.57%
  - other: 2.99%
- Time zone: UTC+2 (EET)
- Climate: Cfb
- Website: congaz.md

Congaz (Gagauz: Kongaz) is a commune and village in the Comrat district, Gagauz Autonomous Territorial Unit of the Republic of Moldova. It is the largest village in Gagauzia, with a population of around 8,269, 7,892 (95.44%) of which being Gagauz.

== History ==
Name of the village is assumed to have a Turkic toponym. It has been considered to be a combination of Kon - "to sit" and kaz/kaaz - goose in Gagauz. This is thought to be derived from a legend, the present-day area of the village supposedly being a resting site for geese.

During the bronze age, a settlement existed 3km from the present-day village, in an area which is now called Kara-Su. The settlement was found by archeologists in 2012, during excavations ceramics and ornaments have been found.

== International relations ==
=== Twin towns — Sister cities ===
Congaz is twinned with:

- Vynohradivka, Bolhrad Raion, Ukraine;
- Selçuklu, Turkey;

== Notable people ==
People from Congaz include these individuals:

- Demian Caraseni (born 1966), Gagauz-Moldovan politician
- Zinovia Dushkova (born 1953), Russian author and historian
- Stepan Esir (born 1950), Gagauz politician
- Mihail Kendighelean (born 1941), Gagauz-Moldovan politician
- Anatoli Laiba (1954–2016), Russian geologist
- Daniil Stadnikov (1851–1927), figure in the Bulgarian revival in Macedonia
- Oleksandr Tkachenko (born 1984), Ukrainian politician
- Todur Zanet (born 1958), Gagauz journalist, folklorist and poet
- Gavril Zanetov (1874–1934), Bulgarian-Gagauz lawyer and historian
