= Gagauzia =

Autonomous region of Moldova

Autonomous Territorial Unit of Gagauzia Avtonom Territoriali Bölümlüü Gagauziya (Gagauz) Unitatea Teritorială Autonomă Găgăuzia (Romanian) Автономное территориальное образование Гагаузия (Russian)
- Autonomous territorial unit
- Flag Coat of arms
- Motto: Yaşasın Gagauziya! (Gagauz) "Long live Gagauzia!"
- Anthem: Tarafım (Gagauz) "My Land"
- Gagauzia within Moldova
- Sovereign state: Moldova
- Gagauz ASSR declared: 12 November 1989
- Gagauz Republic declared: 19 August 1990
- Autonomy agreement reached: 23 December 1994
- Autonomy established: 14 January 1995
- Capital and largest city: Comrat; 46°19′N 28°40′E
- Official languages: Gagauz; Romanian; Russian
- Demonym(s): Gagauz; Gagauzian
- Government: Devolved presidential autonomous region
  - Governor: Ilia Uzun (acting)
  - Chairman of the People's Assembly: Valentin Gaidarzhi
- Legislature: People's Assembly

Area
  - Total: 1,848.5 km^{2} (713.7 sq mi)
  - Water (%): 0.36

Population
  - 2024 census: 103,668
  - Density: 56.1/km^{2} (145.3/sq mi)
- GDP (nominal): 2022 estimate
  - Total: €0.3 billion (5th)
  - Per capita: €2,900
- Currency: Moldovan leu (MDL)
- Time zone: UTC+2 (EET)
  - Summer (DST): UTC+3 (EEST)
- Driving side: Right
- Calling code: +373
- Internet TLD: .md

Gagauzia (/ɡæɡəˈuːziə/) or Gagauz-Yeri, (Note: Gagauz: Gagauz Yeri or Gagauziya, pronounced [ɡɑɡɑ̝.uˈz⁽ʲ⁾ijɑ̽]; Romanian: Găgăuzia; Russian: Гагаузия, romanized: Gagauziya.) officially the Autonomous Territorial Unit of Gagauzia (Note: Gagauz: Avtonom Territorial Bölümlüü Gagauziya; Romanian: Unitatea Teritorială Autonomă Găgăuzia; Russian: Автономное территориальное образование Гагаузия, romanized: Avtonomnoye territoriaľnoye obrazovaniye Gagauziya.) (ATUG), (Note: Romanian: UTAG; Russian: АТОГ.) is an autonomous territorial unit of Moldova. Its autonomy is intended for the local Gagauz people, a Turkic primarily Orthodox Christian ethnic group.

Bessarabia, previously the eastern half of the Principality of Moldavia, was annexed by the Russian Empire in 1812. At the end of World War I, all of Bessarabia – including Gagauzia – united with Kingdom of Romania. A Soviet invasion and occupation began in June 1940, but the territory was again occupied by Romania from 1941 to 1944, after the latter joined the Axis powers and helped invade the USSR. After World War II, Gagauzia was incorporated into the Moldavian Soviet Socialist Republic. In 1990, Gagauzia declared itself independent from Moldova as the Gagauz Republic during the dissolution of the Soviet Union, but it was ultimately reintegrated into Moldova in 1995.

== History ==
In the early 20th century, Bulgarian historian M. Dimitrov enumerated 19 different theories concerning the origin of the Gagauz people. Several decades later, the Gagauz ethnologist M. N. Guboglo listed 21 such theories. In some, the Gagauz are presented as descendants of Bulgars, Cumans-Kipchaks, or a clan of Seljuk Turks led by the Turkoman dervish Sarı Saltık. Their Orthodox confession may suggest that their ancestors were already living in the Balkans prior to the Ottoman conquest in the late 14th century. Another theory suggests a Kutrigur descent. In the official Gagauz museum, a plaque mentions that one of the two main theories is that they descend from the Bulgars.

=== Russian Empire ===
Bessarabia, previously the eastern half of the Principality of Moldavia, was annexed by the Russian Empire in 1812 following the defeat of the Ottoman Empire in the Russo-Turkish War of 1806–1812 (see Treaty of Bucharest (1812)). Nogai tribes who inhabited several villages in south Bessarabia (or Budjak) were forced to leave. Between 1812 and 1846, the Russians relocated the Gagauz people from what is today eastern Bulgaria (which was then under the Ottoman Empire) to the orthodox Bessarabia, mainly in the settlements vacated by the Nogai tribes. They settled there together with Bessarabian Bulgarians in Avdarma, Comrat, Congaz, Tomai, Cișmichioi, and other former Nogai villages. Some Gagauz were also settled in the part of the Principality of Moldavia that did not come under Russian control in 1812. But, within several years, villagers moved to live with their own people in the compact area in the south of Bessarabia where their descendants inhabit in the 21st century.

With the exception of a six-day de facto independence in the winter of 1906, when a peasant uprising declared an autonomous Comrat Republic, ethnic Gagauz have always been ruled by other dominant groups: the Russian Empire (1812–1917), the Kingdom of Romania (1918–1940 and 1941–1944), the Soviet Union (1940–41 and 1944–91), and Moldova (1917–18 and 1991 to date).

=== Soviet Union ===
Gagauz nationalism remained an intellectual movement during the 1980s, but strengthened by the end of the decade, as the Soviet Union began to embrace liberal ideals. In 1988, activists from the local intelligentsia aligned with other ethnic minorities to create a movement known as the Gagauz People. A year later, the Gagauz People held its first assembly; they passed a resolution demanding the creation of an autonomous territory in southern Moldova, with the city of Comrat as its capital.

The Gagauz national movement intensified when Moldovan (Romanian) was accepted as the official language of the Republic of Moldova in August 1989, challenging the then-dominant Russian language which was the official language of the USSR. A part of the multiethnic population of southern Moldova was concerned about the change in official languages. They did not trust the central government in Chișinău. The Gagauz were also worried about the implications for them if Moldova reunited with Romania, as seemed likely at the time. In November 1989, the Gagauz ASSR was declared within Moldova. In August 1990, Comrat declared itself an autonomous Soviet republic separate from Moldova, but the Moldovan government annulled the declaration as unconstitutional. At that time, Stepan Topal emerged as the leader of the Gagauz national movement.

=== Independent Moldova ===
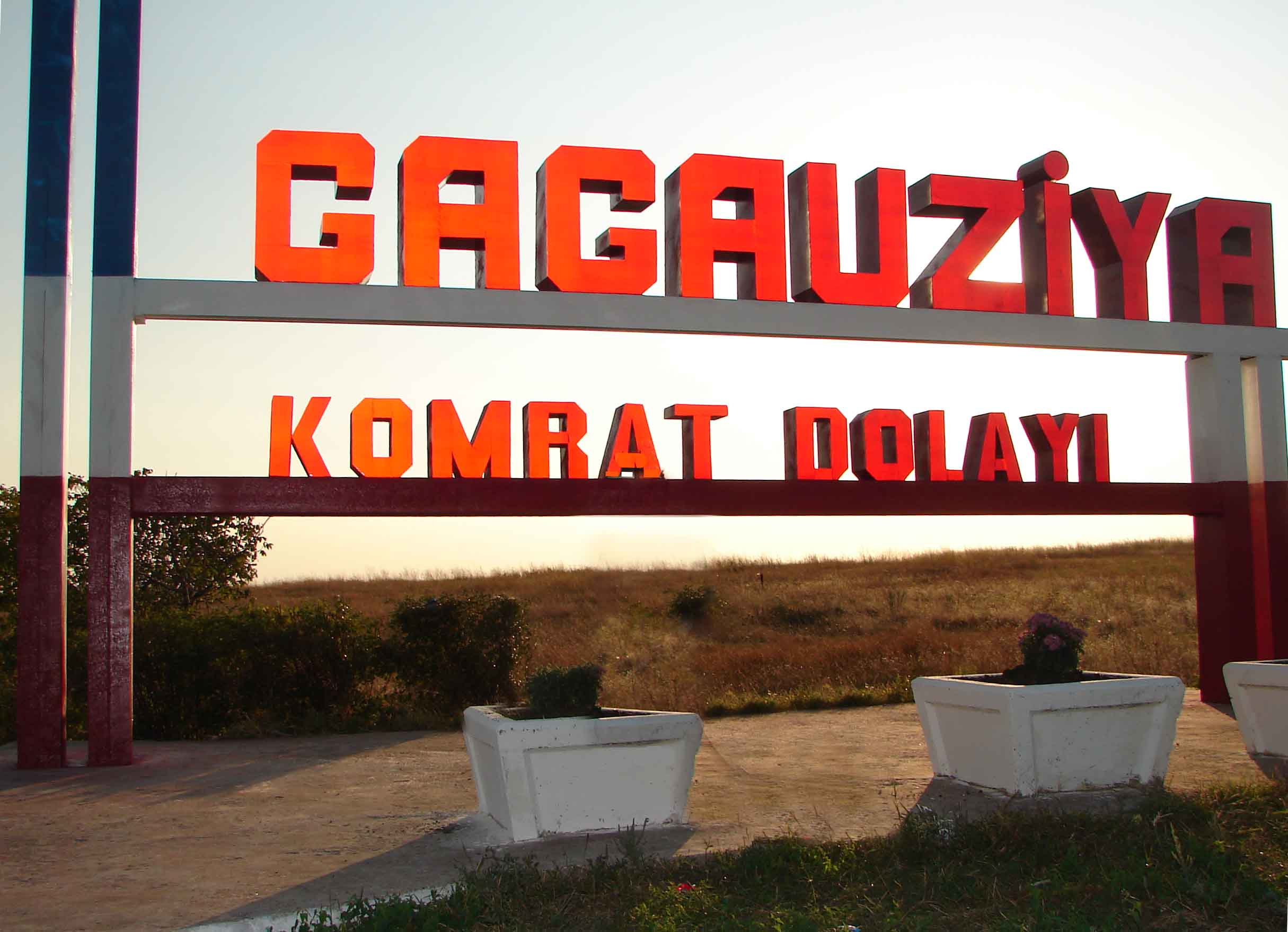
"Gagauzia – Comrat District" sign

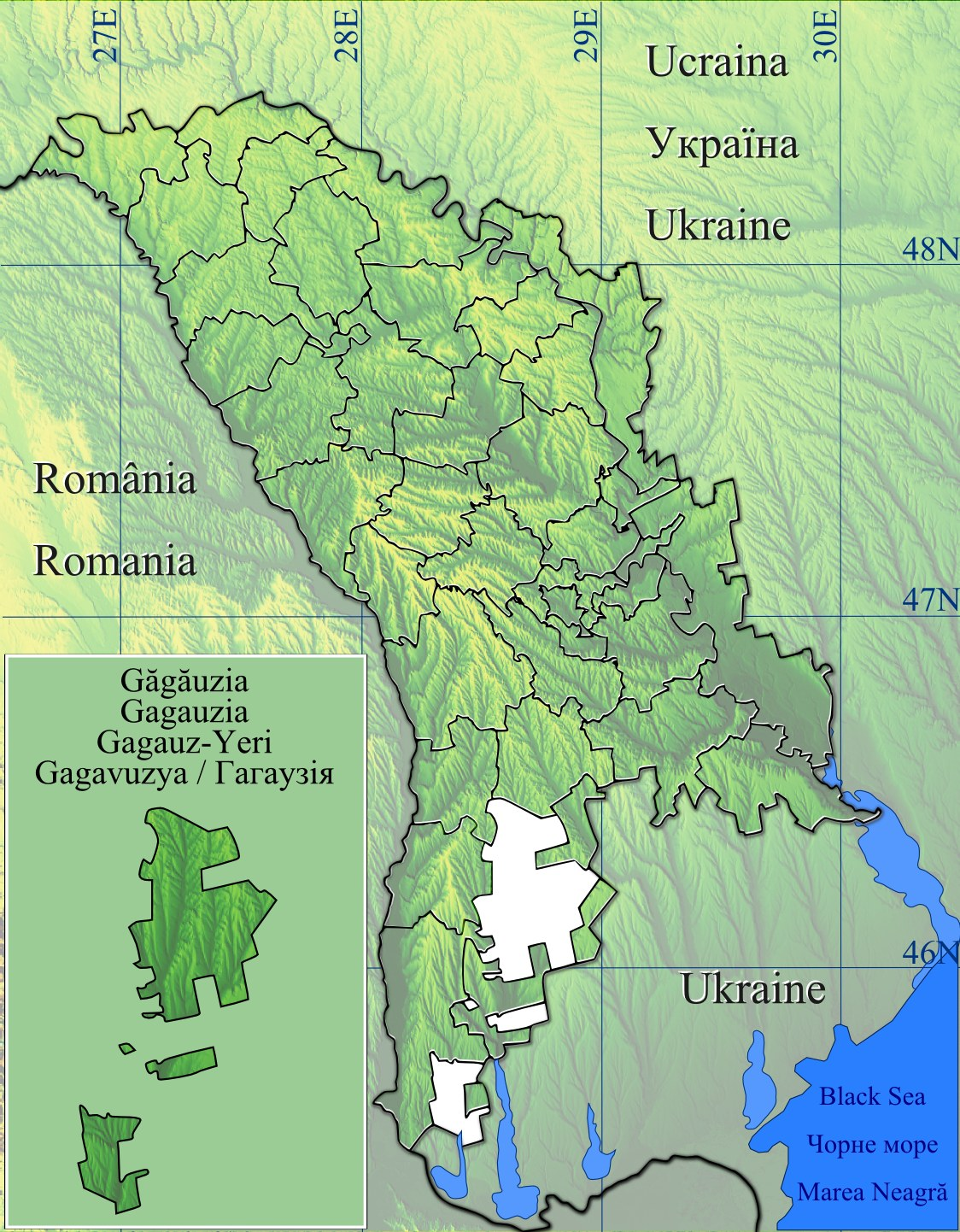
Physical map of Gagauzia

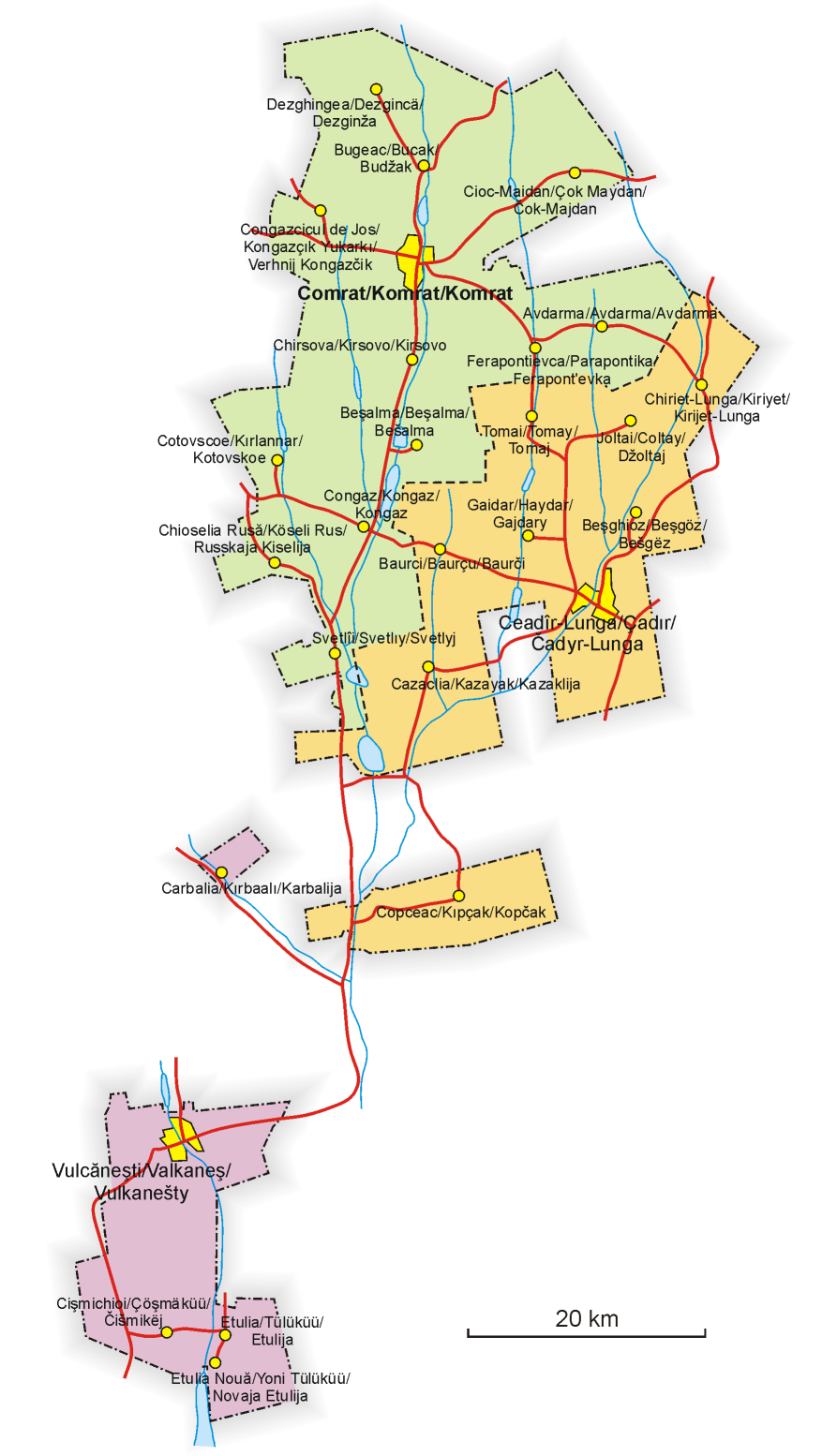
Schematic map of Gagauzia

Support for the Soviet Union remained high in Gagauzia, with a referendum in March 1991 returning an almost unanimous vote in favour of remaining part of the USSR. Many Gagauz supported the Moscow coup attempt in August 1991, and in September the same year, Transnistria declared its independence, thus further straining relations with the government of Moldova. But, when the Moldovan parliament voted on independence on 27 August 1991, six of the 12 Gagauz deputies in the Moldovan parliament voted in favour, while the other six abstained. The Moldovan government began to pay more attention to minority rights. The economic dependence of Gagauzia on the rest of Moldova, and the Moldovan army's inability to defeat Transnistria, created reasons for compromise on both sides.

In February 1994, President Mircea Snegur promised autonomy to the Gagauz, but opposed independence. He was also opposed to the suggestion that Moldova become a federal state made up of three republics: Moldova, Gagauzia, and Transnistria.

In 1994, the Parliament of Moldova awarded to "the people of Gagauzia" (through the adoption of the new Constitution of Moldova) the right of "external self-determination". On 23 December 1994, the Parliament of the Republic of Moldova accepted the "Law on the Special Legal Status of Gagauzia". The law entered into force on 14 January 1995, resolving the dispute peacefully. 23 December is now a Gagauz holiday. Gagauzia is now a "national-territorial autonomous unit" with three official languages: Romanian, Gagauz, and Russian.

Communes with over 50% ethnic Gagauz held referendums where a simple majority was required to join the autonomous region. Communes with fewer Gagauz could have referendums if they were requested by one-third of the population. Following the 5 March 1995 referendum, three towns and 26 communes were included in the Autonomous Gagauz Territory. Gheorghe Tabunșcic was elected to serve as the Governor (Romanian: Guvernator, Gagauz: Başkan) of Gagauzia for a four-year term, as were the deputies of the local parliament, "The People's Assembly" (Gagauz: Halk Topluşu), with Petru Pașalî as chairman.

Dumitru Croitor won the 1999 governor elections and began to assert the rights granted to the governor by the 1994 agreement. The central authorities of Moldova proved unwilling to accept the results, initiating a lengthy stand-off between the autonomy and Chișinău. Finally, Croitor resigned in 2002 due to the pressure from the Moldovan government, which accused him of abuse of authority, relations with the separatist authorities of Transnistria, and other charges.

The central electoral commission of Gagauzia did not register Croitor as a candidate for the post of the governor in the subsequent elections, and Tabunșcic was elected in what was described as unfair elections. Mihail Formuzal served as the governor of Gagauzia from 2006 until 2015. That year Irina Vlah was elected to the position, with 51% of the vote.

On 2 February 2014, Gagauzia held a referendum with an overwhelming majority of voters opting for closer ties with Russia over EU integration. They also said they preferred Gagauz independence if Moldova were to choose to enter the EU.

On 23 March 2015, Irina Vlah of the Party of Socialists was elected as the new governor after a strongly pro-Russian campaign, dominated by the quest for closer ties with the Russian Federation. On 19 July 2023, Vlah was succeeded by Evghenia Guțul of the Șor Party, a Eurosceptic and Russophilic party that was declared unconstitutional and banned by the Constitutional Court of Moldova exactly 1 month earlier after an investigation was launched in May 2023 into suspected voter bribery during the 2023 Gagauz gubernatorial election. Guțul sits as an independent as a result of the Moldovan ban of Șor.

In the 2024 Moldovan referendum on including the goal of European Union membership in the constitution, Gagauzia voted 94.84% against the wording "Do you support the amendment of the Constitution with a view to the accession of the Republic of Moldova to the European Union?", the highest opposition of any administrative division of Moldova. Neighbouring Taraclia District had the second-highest opposition, at 92.04%, whereas the country as a whole voted narrowly in favour (50.39%), despite allegations of Russian interference from president Maia Sandu and from the European Union, including Commission President Ursula von der Leyen and evidence of vote buying reported by BBC News.

== Geography ==
Gagauzia comprises four enclaves, and is divided into three districts. The main, central enclave includes the cities Comrat and Ceadîr-Lunga and is divided into two districts with those cities serving as administrative centers. The second largest enclave is located around the city of Vulcănești, while two smaller enclaves are the villages of Copceac and Carbalia. The village of Carbalia falls under administration of Vulcănești, while Copceac is part of the Ceadîr-Lunga district.

== Administrative divisions ==
Gagauzia consists of one municipality, two cities, and 23 communes containing a total of 32 localities.

| Official name | Gagauz name | % Gagauz |
|---|---|---|
| Comrat (municipality) | Komrat | 72.8% |
| Ceadîr-Lunga (municipality) | Çadır-Lunga | 73.7% |
| Vulcănești (city); Vulcănești stație c.f. | Valkaneş; Valkaneş demir yolu | 69.4% 22.5% |
| Avdarma | Avdarma | 94.2% |
| Baurci | Baurçu | 97.9% |
| Beșalma | Beşalma | 96.7% |
| Beșghioz | Beşgöz | 93.0% |
| Bugeac | Bucak | 61.8% |
| Carbalia | Kırbaalı | 70.2% |

| Official name | Gagauz name | % Gagauz |
|---|---|---|
| Cazaclia | Kazayak | 96.5% |
| Chioselia Rusă | Köseli Rus | 25.2% |
| Chiriet-Lunga | Kiriyet | 92.6% |
| Chirsova | Başküü | 45.6% |
| Cioc-Maidan | Çok-Maydan | 93.1% |
| Cișmichioi | Çöşmäküü | 94.4% |
| Congaz | Kongaz | 96.1% |
| Congazcicul de Sus; Congazcicul de Jos; Dudulești | Kongazçık Yukarkı; Kongazçık Aşaakı; Duduleşt | 73.4% 87.2% 4.4% |
| Copceac | Kıpçak | 95.0% |

| Official name | Gagauz name | % Gagauz |
|---|---|---|
| Cotovscoe | Kırlannar | 95.4% |
| Dezghingea | Dezgincä | 94.5% |
| Etulia; Etulia Nouă; Etulia stație c.f. | Tülüküü; Eni Tülüküü; Tülüküü demir yolu | 92.7% 83.1% 94.5% |
| Ferapontievca | Parapontika | 28.0% |
| Gaidar | Haydar | 96.5% |
| Joltai | Coltay | 96.0% |
| Svetlîi; Alexeevca | Svetlıy; Alekseevka | 35.4% 33.5% |
| Tomai | Tomay | 95.1% |

== Politics ==
The autonomy of Gagauzia is guaranteed by the Moldovan constitution and regulated by the 1994 Gagauz Autonomy Act. If Moldova decided to unite with Romania, Gagauzia would have the right of self-determination. The Gagauz People's Assembly (Gagauz: Halk Topluşu; Romanian: Adunarea Populară) has a mandate for lawmaking powers within its own jurisdiction. This includes laws on education, culture, local development, budgetary and taxation issues, social security, and questions of territorial administration. The People's Assembly also has two special powers: it may participate in the formulation of Moldova's internal and foreign policy; and, should central regulations interfere with the jurisdiction of Gagauz-Yeri, it has the right of appeal to Moldova's Constitutional Court.

The highest official of Gagauzia, who heads the executive power structure, is the Governor of Gagauzia (Gagauz: Başkan; Romanian: Guvernatorul Găgăuziei). The governor is elected by popular suffrage for a four-year term, and has power over all public administrative bodies of Gagauzia. The governor is also a member of the Government of the Republic of Moldova. Eligibility for governorship requires fluency in the Gagauz language, Moldovan citizenship, and a minimum age of 35 years.

Permanent executive power in Gagauz Yeri is exercised by the Executive Committee (Bakannik Komiteti / Comitetul Executiv). Its members are appointed by the governor, or by a simple majority vote in the Assembly at its first session. The Committee ensures the application of the laws of the Republic of Moldova and those of the Assembly of Gagauz-Yeri.

As part of its autonomy, Gagauzia has its own police force.

Gagauz Halkı is a former Gagauz separatist political party, now outlawed.

On 9 July 2026, the Constitutional Court ruled that regional elections in Gagauzia must follow national legislation, validating a request from Justice Minister Vladislav Cojuhari. It declared several provisions in the 1994 law governing Gagauzia's special legal status unconstitutional.

=== Elections ===
Elections for the Governor of Gagauzia and to the People's Assembly of Gagauzia as well as referendums take place in the autonomous region.

The population also votes in the national legislatives elections.

Gagauz regional elections since 1995
| Parties | 1995 | 1999 | 2003 | 2008 | 2012 | 2016 | 2021 |
|---|---|---|---|---|---|---|---|
| Party of Socialists of the Republic of Moldova (PSRM) | – | – | – | – | 1 | 6 | 9 |
| Party of Communists of the Republic of Moldova (PCRM) | 8 | 4 | 16 | 10 | 7 | – | 9 |
| We Build Europe at Home Party (PACE) | – | – | – | – | – | – | 1 |
| Democratic Party of Moldova (PDM) | – | 1 | – | 2 | – | 1 | – |
| Liberal Democratic Party of Moldova (PLDM) | – | – | – | – | 2 | – | – |
| Socio-Political Movement "Equality" | – | – | 1 | 2 | – | – | – |
| Socialist Party of Moldova (PSM) | – | 2 | 1 | – | – | – | – |
| Social Democratic Union "Ant-Hope" (UFS) | – | 2 | – | – | – | – | – |
| People's Democratic Party of Moldova (PDPM) | – | 1 | – | – | – | – | – |
| People's Party "Homeland" (PPV) | 5 | – | – | – | – | – | – |
| Democratic Agrarian Party of Moldova (PDAM) | 5 | – | – | – | – | – | – |
| People's Party of the Gagauz (PPG) | 1 | – | – | – | – | – | – |
| Trade unions | 11 | – | – | – | – | – | – |
| Independents | 5 | 25 | 17 | 21 | 25 | 28 | 25 |

== Economy ==
The base of Gagauzia's economy is agriculture, particularly viticulture. The main export products are wine, sunflower oil, non-alcoholic beverages, wool, leather, and textiles. There are 12 wineries, processing more than 400,000 tonnes annually. There are also two oil factories, two carpet factories, one meat factory, and one non-alcoholic beverage factory.

== Transport ==
There are 451 kilometres (280 mi) of roads in Gagauzia, of which 82% are paved.

== Demographics ==
According to the 2024 Census, Gagauzia had a population of 103,668, of which 32.6% urban and 57.4% rural population.

=== Ethnic composition ===
According to the 2014 and 2024 censuses results, the ethnic breakdown in Gagauzia was:

Ethnic Groups in Censuses
| Ethnic Group | 2014 | 2024 |
| Ethnic Group | % | % |
|---|---|---|
| Gagauz | 83.1 | 81.2 |
| Moldovans | 5.0 | 6.3 |
| Bulgarians | 5.0 | 5.5 |
| Russians | 3.4 | 3.2 |
| Ukrainians | 2.6 | 2.6 |
| Gypsies | 0.3 | 0.3 |
| Romanians | 0.0 | 0.1 |
| Others | 0.6 | 0.8 |

There is an ongoing identity controversy over whether Romanians and Moldovans are the same ethnic group. At the census, every citizen could only declare one nationality; consequently, one could not declare oneself both Moldovan and Romanian.

=== Languages ===
According to the 2024 census results, population structure by mother tongue in Gagauzia was:

Mother Tongue in Censuses
| | Mother tongue | | Spoken at home | |
| Language | 2014 | 2024 | 2014 | 2024 |
| Language | % | % | % | % |
|---|---|---|---|---|
| Gagauz | 79.5 | 77.2 | 54.4 | 48.8 |
| Russian | 10.4 | 12.1 | 42.5 | 47.3 |
| Moldovan (Romanian) | 3.9 | 4.7 | 1.1 | 1.7 |
| Bulgarian | 4.2 | 4.2 | 1.7 | 1.5 |
| Ukrainian | 1.4 | 1.2 | 0.2 | 0.4 |
| Others | 0.6 | 0.6 | 0.2 | 0.3 |

=== Religion ===
According to the 2024 census results, the major religions in Gagauzia were:

Religion in Censuses
| Religion | 2014 | 2024 |
| Religion | % | % |
|---|---|---|
| Christians | 99.4 | 99.1 |
| – Orthodox Christians | 97.2 | 95.9 |
| – Other Christians | 2.2 | 3.2 |
| Other religion | 0.5 | 0.3 |
| Atheism and irreligion | 0.1 | 0.5 |

== Education ==
Gagauzia has 55 schools, the Comrat Pedagogical College (high school plus two years over high school), and Comrat State University (Komrat Devlet Universiteti).

Despite declaring Gagauz as the national language of the autonomous region, the local authorities do not provide any full Gagauz-teaching school; most of those are Russian-language as opposed to inner Moldovan full Romanian language education.

== Culture ==
Turkey financed the creation of a Turkish cultural centre (Türk İşbirliği Ve Kalkınma İdaresi Başkanlığı) and a Turkish library (Atatürk Kütüphanesi). In the village of Beșalma, there is a Gagauz historical and ethnographical museum established by Dimitriy Kara Çöban.

In 2013, Ludmila Tukan was selected to represent Gagauzia in the territory's debut at the Turkvision Song Contest, with the song Вернись любовь ("Come back love").

== Sport ==
Not being a sovereign nation, Gagauzia's football team cannot be admitted to FIFA. However, in 2006 Gagauzia did participate in the ELF Cup, held in North Cyprus, where it competed with teams from other regions around the world which fall short of full national sovereignty.

Gagauzia has various football clubs including, FC Olimp Comrat, Univer-Oguzsport, and FC Saxan Gagauz Yeri, they play their matches in Ceadîr-Lunga Stadium.

== See also ==
- Gagauz people
- FC Olimp Comrat
