= Gagauz language =

Oghuz Turkic language of Eastern Europe

Gagauz
- gagauzça, gagauz dili; гагаузча, гагауз дили
- Gagauz in Latin and Cyrillic scripts
- Pronunciation: [ɡɑɡɑˈuzd͡ʒɑ]
- Native to: Moldova, Ukraine, Russia, Turkey
- Region: Gagauzia
- Ethnicity: Gagauz
- Native speakers: 148,720 (total speakers), 115,000 (in Moldova) (2014)
- Language family: Turkic: Common Turkic; Oghuz; Western Oghuz; Gagauz
- Early forms: Old Anatolian Turkish: Ottoman Turkish
- Writing system: Latin (Gagauz alphabet, current); Cyrillic (historical); Greek (historical)

Official status
- Official language in: Gagauzia (Moldova)
- Recognised minority language in: Ukraine

Language codes
- ISO 639-3: gag
- Glottolog: gaga1249
- ELP: Gagauz
- Linguasphere: part of 44-AAB-a
- Gagauz is classified as Definitely Endangered by the UNESCO Atlas of the World's Languages in Danger (2010)

Gagauz (/ɡæɡəˈuːz/; gagauz dili or gagauzça) is a Turkic language spoken by the Gagauz people of Moldova, Ukraine, Russia and Turkey and is an official language of the Autonomous Region of Gagauzia in Moldova. Gagauz belongs to the Oghuz branch of Turkic languages, alongside Azerbaijani, Turkmen, and Turkish. Gagauz is a distinct language from Balkan Gagauz Turkish to some degree.

Though it was established as a written language in 1957, Gagauz was not used in schools until 1959. Gagauz is a language derived from Balkan Gagauz Turkish; Balkan linguistics was the first to view the consequences of language contact as normal rather than corrupt. The term "Gagauz language" and the identification of one's language as "Gagauz" were established concurrently with or even after the creation of national self-awareness. About 150,000 Gagauz resided in Moldova in 1986, where they lived in settlements within the Comrat, Ceadîr-Lunga and Vulcănești districts. Along with the majority of the Gagauz living in Moldova, there are four cities in Bulgaria in which the Gagauz reside.

== History ==
Between 1750 and 1846, the ancestors of the Gagauz emigrated from the current-day Bulgarian Black Sea coast north of Varna to Russia and settled in the region that is now the current-day Republic of Moldova, allowed to do so on the condition that they converted to Orthodox Christianity by Empress Catherine. In the aftermath of the dissolution of the Soviet Union, the 1994 law on Special Legal Status of Gagauzia was passed in Moldova, which was put into effect in 1995, granting the Gagauz territorial autonomy.

== Phonology ==
=== Consonants ===
Consonant phonemes of Gagauz
		Labial	Dental	Alveolar	Palatal	Velar	Glottal
Nasal		m		n			
Plosive/ Affricate	voiceless	p	t	t͡s	t͡ʃ	k	
Plosive/ Affricate	voiced	b	d		d͡ʒ	ɡ	
Fricative	voiceless	f		s	ʃ		h
Fricative	voiced	v		z	ʒ		
Rhotic				ɾ~r			
Approximant				l	j		

=== Vowels ===
Vowel phonemes of Gagauz
	Front		Central	Back	
Close	i	y		ɯ	u
Mid	e	ø	ə	o	
Open	æ			ɑ	

== Orthography ==
It appears that the first alphabet to be used for the language was the Greek alphabet in the late 19th century. For example, orientalist Otto Blau claims that plays of Euripides had been translated into the Gagauz language and had been written with Greek letters.

Beginning in 1957, Cyrillic was used until 1993. On May 13, 1993, the parliament of the Republic of Moldova passed a decision providing for the official adoption of the Latin-based alphabet for the Gagauz language. This was subsequently amended in 1996. The Gagauz alphabet adopted is modelled on the modern Turkish alphabet, with the addition of three letters: ⟨ä⟩ to represent the sound of [æ] (as ⟨ə⟩ in Azeri), ⟨ê⟩ to represent the [ə] (schwa) sound, which does not exist in Turkish, and ⟨ţ⟩ to represent the sound [ts] from the Romanian alphabet. On the other hand, unlike Crimean Tatar, Turkish, and some other Turkic languages, Gagauz does not have the letter ⟨ğ⟩, which had become completely silent in the Gagauz language.

Dotted and dotless I are separate letters, each with its own uppercase and lowercase form. I is the capital form of ı, and İ is the capital form of i. The Gagauz alphabet has no q, w or x. Instead, those characters are transliterated into Gagauz as k, v and ks.

Modern Gagauz alphabet:

A a	Ä ä	B b	C c	Ç ç	D d	E e	Ê ê
F f	G g	H h	I ı	İ i	J j	K k	L l
M m	N n	O o	Ö ö	P p	R r	S s	Ş ş
T t	Ţ ţ	U u	Ü ü	V v	Y y	Z z

== Current situation ==
A study in 2012 was conducted on the Gagauz community to assess the current situation and sociocultural context. The findings show that within Gagauzia, official documents, printed publications, and official web sites are only in Russian. The National Passport System in Moldova does not allow the spelling of names in Gagauz. Signposts in Gagauzia are mostly in Romanian, and the names of squares and streets have not changed since the time of the Soviet Union.

=== Education ===
Despite various laws that support the rights of citizens to education in their native language, almost all instruction in Gagauzian schools is in Russian. Gagauz, while the native language of all students, is only taught as a "native language" class for a few hours per week. Research has also shown that there are not serious desires or attempts to institute Gagauz as a language of instruction. In a study, 80.6% of respondents preferred Russian as the medium of instruction at schools. There are, however, some notable efforts to increase Gagauz language education. Todur Zanet, editor-in-chief of the Ana Sözü local newspaper, has played an active role in encouraging readers and local authorities to promote instruction in their mother tongue. Zanet has also contributed significantly to efforts to standardize the language and increase its accessibility through print and other mediums.

=== Media ===
Ana Sözü is the largest local newspaper in Gagauzia. It is also the only local newspaper still written entirely in Gagauz, and was the first newspaper of any kind published in the Gagauz language. Apart from Ana Sözü, there are various newspapers published in the Autonomous Territorial Unit of Gagauzia, including Açık Göz, Gagauz Yeri, Gagauz Sesi, Halk Birlii, Novıy Vzgliad, Vesti Gagauzii, and Znamea.

In addition to printed materials, the company Gagauzia Radio Television (GRT) produces radio and television broadcasts in Gagauz.
