= 2026 Gagauz general election =

General election in the Moldovan autonomous region of Gagauzia

- 15 November 2026 (first round); 29 November 2026 (second round)
- Gubernatorial election
- Turnout: 37.60% (first round) (▼24.10pp)
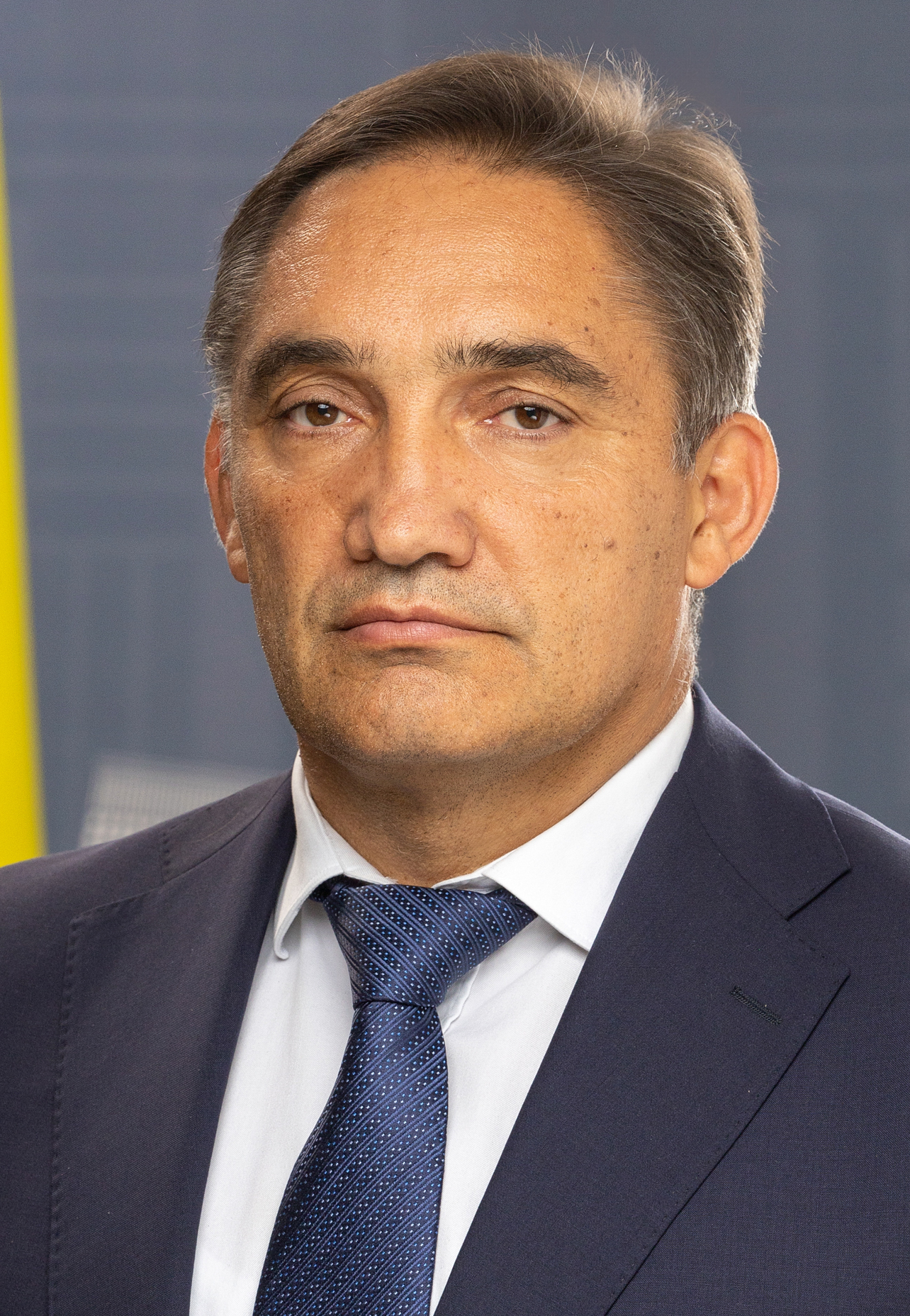

Nominee	Alexandr Stoianoglo	Fiodor Gagauz
Party	Independent	PSRM
Popular vote	18,136	11,426
Percentage	38.44%	24.22%
Başkan before election
Ilia Uzun
Independent
Elected Başkan
TBD
- Legislative election
- All 35 seats in the People's Assembly; 18 seats needed for a majority
- Turnout: 37.60% (first round) (▼3.01pp)
Party	Leader	Vote %	Seats	+/–
PSRM	Igor Dodon	20.33	3	
Independents	—	69.65	10	
This lists parties that won seats. See the complete results below.
Chairman before
Valentin Gaidarzhi; Independent

General elections were held in Moldova's autonomous region of Gagauzia on 15 November 2026 to elect the region's Governor (Gagauz: Başkan) and the members of Gagauzia's local parliament, the People's Assembly of Gagauzia.

In the first round of the gubernatorial election, the PSRM's Fiodor Gagauz and independent Alexandr Stoianoglo advanced to the runoff to be held on 29 November 2026, alongside the rest of the People's Assembly seats.

== History ==
On 1 September 2026, the Central Electoral Commission (CEC) of Moldova scheduled general elections for 15 November in the autonomous region of Gagauzia to elect both the region's Governor (Gagauz: Başkan) and the members of the People's Assembly of Gagauzia, the region's local parliament. The move brought to an end a legislative deadlock in the region following the conviction of the previous governor, Evghenia Guțul, who received a seven-year sentence over illegal financing related to the outlawed Șor Party.

On 21 September, Grigorii Uzun, a member of the Party of Socialists of the Republic of Moldova (PSRM), announced that he would not run in the election for the post of governor. This was despite him having been considered the PSRM's likeliest candidate, with Uzun being who ran in the 2023 gubernatorial election in the second round against Guțul. His announcement was due to the fact that he did not speak Romanian ("Moldovan", as he called it) at the time, as new provisions had been adopted in the electoral code in August requiring candidates for the post to speak both Gagauz and Romanian.

Subsequently, on 24 September, the PSRM announced it would back Fiodor Gagauz, who submitted his registration documents to run as a candidate for governorship on the same day. Gagauz had been a member of Gagauzia's People's Assembly between 2012 and 2014 and had held three consecutive mandates as member of the Parliament of Moldova since 2014.

== Analysis ==
On 10 September, Igor Grosu, the President of the Parliament of Moldova, asserted that the Gagauz general election should take place in a fair and transparent manner and that the authorities would not tolerate attempts to bribe voters or buy their votes or other maneuvers to influence the results. He also stated that influence methods, which he attributed to Russia and to criminal groups, could be used during the election period, including attempts to corrupt, manipulate and discourage participation. As the pan-European think tank European Council on Foreign Relations (ECFR) stated, Russia had spent four million euros to buy 27,000 votes in the previous 2023 gubernatiorial election in Gagauzia, helping secure the victory of Guțul, who was an affiliate of Moldovan pro-Russian fugitive oligarch Ilan Shor.

The Centre for Strategic Communication and Countering Disinformation (StratCom), an administrative body of the Moldovan state, analysed potential risks and vulnerabilities within the regional information space in the context of the general election in Gagauzia, highlighting the risk of attempts to exploit political and identitarian tensions and delegitimise the electoral process, as well as the potential hazard of a coordinated amplification of manipulative narratives via digital means. The centre evaluated these potential risks in the context of hypothetical information manipulation and foreign interference activities. StratCom highlighted the increasingly frequent use of tactics such as the creation of "civic platforms" with political agendas, the fostering of suspicions regarding the electoral process to pave the way for its subsequent contestation, collective victimisation, the stoking of fear through narratives about war and NATO accession and the use of domestic and international election observers as a tool for manipulation.

On 9 October, at the Moldova Security Forum in Chișinău, Alexandru Musteață, the director of the Security and Intelligence Service of Moldova (SIS), declared that Russia had lost one of its primary tools for influencing the situation in Gagauzia: the ability to control elections in the region and to establish the rules governing how these are organized. He also assured that monitoring activities of the SIS for the upcoming electoral process were continuing. His declarations came after the Constitutional Court of Moldova ruled that national legislation took precedence over regional one and that the CEC could organize the election in accordance with national legislation.

== Candidates ==
Neither the Party of Action and Solidarity (PAS), ruling Moldova at the time, nor other pro-European parties such as the Democracy at Home Party or the Dignity and Truth Platform presented any candidates for either of the two elections. This was in order to avoid a predictable defeat in the pro-Russian region, according to Moldovan political analysts Nicolae Negru and Igor Boțan. Boțan stated that PAS had no chances of winning the elections, as the party's image in Gagauzia had been tarnished by the conflict between the central government in Chișinău and the Gagauz authorities that preceded the election.

=== Gubernatorial election ===
On 12 October, Central Electoral Council of Gagauzia has registered the following eight candidates for the position of governor (or başkan):

Name	Born	Experience	Party	Status
Fiodor Gagauz	23 October 1958 (68); Gaidar, Gagauzia	Member of Parliament (2014–2025)	Party of Socialists of the Republic of Moldova	Registered
Alexandr Stoianoglo	3 June 1967 (59); Comrat, Gagauzia	Member of Parliament (2009–2014, 2025–present); Prosecutor General of Moldova (2019–2021); Vice President of the Parliament (2009–2010)	Independent	Registered
Cornel Dudnic	2 March 1982 (44); Vulcănești, Gagauzia	Member of Parliament (2014–2019)	Independent	Registered
Ivan Cîlcic	24 October 1966 (60); Sukhumi, Georgia		Gagauz People's Party	Registered
Petru Vlah	13 July 1970 (56); Comrat, Gagauzia	Member of Parliament (2010–2014); Member of the People's Assembly of Gagauzia (2008–2010)	New Historical Option	Registered
Ivanna Koksal	9 February 1978 (48); Ceadîr-Lunga, Gagauzia	Member of Parliament (2019–2025); Member of the People's Assembly of Gagauzia (2008–2013, 2016–2019)	Independent	Registered
Serghei Anastasov	2 July 1964 (62); Comrat, Gagauzia	Mayor of Comrat (2015–present)	Independent	Registered
Oleg Garizan	27 September 1971 (55); Costuleni, Ungheni	Mayor of Copceac (1999–2009, 2015–present); Member of Parliament (2009–2014)	Independent	Registered

=== Legislative election ===
On 12 October, Central Electoral Council of Gagauzia registered the candidates from the following political parties running in 35 constituencies of the People's Assembly of Gagauzia:

Party	Abbr.	Ideology	Candidates
Party of Socialists of the Republic of Moldova	PSRM	Democratic socialism	23
Gagauz People's Party	PPG	Gagauz regionalism	9
Moldovans Alliance	AM	Moldovenism	7
National Alternative Movement	MAN	Social democracy	2
For the Country	PȚ	Social conservatism	2
Independents		Non-partisan	92

== Irregularities and monitorization ==
On 23 October, Radio Europa Liberă Moldova claimed it had identified at least 30 accounts on TikTok campaigning for PSRM candidate for governor Fiodor Gagauz. The broadcaster stated the accounts' content was almost identical and that most of the accounts had been created in the last few days, while others were older "reactivated" accounts. Similarly, on 26 October, Moldovan think tank WatchDog.MD alleged that at least 20 TikTok accounts were publishing identical content promoting him, with some of them having been created on 16 October, the day of the official start of the election campaign. According to Radio Europa Liberă Moldova, the earliest videos of this campaign in support of Gagauz that it identified appeared on 17 October, and the accounts had garnered around 150,000 views and 12,000 likes as of 23 October. According to a survey published at the start of the electoral campaign, TikTok was then the main platform used as a source of political information for the inhabitants of Gagauzia.

According to the broadcaster, the accounts promoted videos and messages in support of Gagauz, including his official candidacy announcement, footage from his campaign launch, his electoral promises and images of him with supporters, among others. The accounts also promoted messages against other candidates for governor, with some alleging that they had secret backing from the ruling PAS, which was notably unpopular in the region at the time. Gagauz was also promoted through dozens of posts on TikTok, Facebook and Telegram by Nina Dimoglo, who had been an activist for the Șor Party and a presenter for several pro-Russian channels associated with Ilan Shor.

For his part, on 27 October, Gagauz denied having any connection to the TikTok accounts, describing the allegations as a provocation intended to discredit him and calling for an investigation from law enforcement. The PSRM also denied having any connection to the accounts or having funded or coordinated their activity. The party formally notified the CEC about the accounts and referred to them as a provocation by PAS to get Gagauz excluded from the election. In a statement sent to Radio Europa Liberă Moldova, TikTok announced that it would create a team tasked to monitor the election in Gagauzia, which would work to identify false information and verify data in collaboration with Reuters. The CEC and TikTok later announced that they would continue cooperating to promote reliable electoral information and combat disinformation in the context of the Gagauz election, with there having been a meeting in Bucharest, Romania, between CEC vice president Pavel Postica and Simion Dorin Rusu, TikTok's Government Relations and Public Policy Manager for Romania, Hungary and the Balkans.

On 5 November, Moldovan national public TV channel Moldova 1 was fined with 5,000 Moldovan lei by the Audiovisual Council (CA) amid violations during its coverage of the Gagauz election. Specifically, it concerned deficiencies regarding the information required to be presented when disseminating the results of opinion polls, as well as in the proper delineation of the segment of the Russian-language program С другой стороны ("On the Other Side") that was relevant to the election.

Before the election, volunteers of the FREEDOM non-governmental organization (NGO) conducted an information campaign in 25 localities across Gagauzia, urging voters not to sell their votes, to reject any money and gifts and to vote according to their own convictions. The campaign took place against the backdrop of the previous 2023 gubernatorial election in Gagauzia, marked by numerous accusations of corrupting voters which became the subject of several criminal investigations. The campaign witnessed firsthand among many residents strong distrust and disappointment amid unfulfilled promises and a sense of a lack of change, as well as low expectations regarding the election. NGO representatives stated that some voters admitted they might accept money or gifts in exchange for their votes if offered, although they also described encountering individuals unwilling to sell their vote and making efforts to convince others not to do so.

On 12 November, Moldovan human rights NGO Promo-LEX published a report describing numerous irregularities observed during the election campaign. These included the potential misuse of administrative resources, campaign meetings with public-sector employees during working hours, campaign advertising placed in unauthorized locations and expenditures that would not have been declared by the candidates. That same day, a 15-member delegation of the Congress of Local and Regional Authorities of the Council of Europe (CoE) began an election monitorization mission in Gagauzia that would finish on 16 November. On 13 November, the Gagauz People's Party and For the Country parties were formally warned by the CEC, as the two parties had used money from campaign accounts without having previously declared those funds.

== Opinion polls ==
=== Gubernatorial election ===
Fieldwork date	Pollster	Sample size	Stoianoglo Ind.	Gagauz PSRM	Koksal Ind.	Anastasov Ind.	Garizan Ind.	Vlah NOI	Dudnic Ind.	Cîlcic PPG	Other	Lead
5–11 Nov 2026	IMAS	627	39.5	26.1	14.3	7.2	1.9	2.7	7.6	0.7	—N/a	13.4
17–25 Oct 2026	IMAS	825	45.5	18.1	15.0	9.5	5.1	3.3	1.9	1.7	—N/a	27.4
11–19 Sep 2026	IMAS	818	47.4	4.7	8.3	6.6	3.4	2.9	—N/a	—N/a	26.7 (Note: Grigorii Uzun – 16.4, Vadim Ceban – 1.4, Valentin Gaidarji – 0.7.)	31.0

== Endorsements ==
The following first-round gubernatorial election candidates announced an endorsement for a candidate running in the second round:

Candidate	First round	Endorsement
Ivanna Koksal	11.05%	Fiodor Gagauz

== Results ==
=== Governor ===
Candidate	Party	Votes	%
Alexandr Stoianoglo	Independent	18,136	38.44
Fiodor Gagauz	Party of Socialists of the Republic of Moldova	11,425	24.21
Cornel Dudnic	Independent	7,354	15.59
Ivanna Koksal	Independent	5,216	11.05
Serghei Anastasov	Independent	2,225	4.72
Oleg Garizan	Independent	1,502	3.18
Petru Vlah	New Historical Option	934	1.98
Ivan Cîlcic	Gagauz People's Party	391	0.83
Total		47,183	100.00
Valid votes		47,183	96.77
Invalid/blank votes		1,577	3.23
Total votes		48,760	100.00
Registered voters/turnout		129,604	37.62
Source: Central Electoral Commission of Moldova

=== People's Assembly ===
Party	Votes	%	Seats	Total seats
Party of Socialists of the Republic of Moldova	9,496	20.33	3	3
Gagauz People's Party	1,690	3.62	0	0
Moldovans Alliance	1,524	3.26	0	0
National Alternative Movement	939	2.01	0	0
For the Country	527	1.13	0	0
Independent	32,532	69.65	10	10
Total	46,708	100.00	13	13
Valid votes	46,708	96.19		
Invalid/blank votes	1,851	3.81		
Total votes	48,559	100.00		
Registered voters/turnout	129,478	37.50		
Source: Central Electoral Commission of Moldova

==== By constituency ====
№1 Comrat
Candidate	Party	Votes	%
Maxim Bolgar	National Alternative Movement	923	41.35
Nicolai Dudoglo	Gagauz People's Party	731	32.75
Serghei Chiulaflî	Independent	578	25.90
Total		2,232	100.00
Valid votes		2,232	95.10
Invalid/blank votes		115	4.90
Total votes		2,347	100.00
Registered voters/turnout		5,391	43.54

№2 Comrat
Candidate	Party	Votes	%
Serghei Gagauz	Independent	954	42.03
Ivan Panea	Independent	484	21.32
Alexandr Caraivan	Independent	393	17.31
Alexei Cara	Independent	260	11.45
Anastasia Chirillovskaia	Independent	116	5.11
Alexandr Levandovski	Gagauz People's Party	63	2.78
Total		2,270	100.00
Valid votes		2,270	93.84
Invalid/blank votes		149	6.16
Total votes		2,419	100.00
Registered voters/turnout		5,479	44.15

№3 Comrat
Candidate	Party	Votes	%
Alexandr Tarnavski	Independent	834	39.19
Olga Mitioglo	Independent	512	24.06
Vasili Novac	Independent	439	20.63
Vadim Ceban	Independent	222	10.43
Ivan Cîlcic	Gagauz People's Party	121	5.69
Total		2,128	100.00
Valid votes		2,128	95.77
Invalid/blank votes		94	4.23
Total votes		2,222	100.00
Registered voters/turnout		5,592	39.74

№4 Comrat
Candidate	Party	Votes	%
Ivan Dimitroglo	Party of Socialists of the Republic of Moldova	895	46.09
Gheorghi Mitioglo	Gagauz People's Party	593	30.54
Iuri Cara	Independent	249	12.82
Oleg Sibov	Independent	205	10.56
Total		1,942	100.00
Valid votes		1,942	91.95
Invalid/blank votes		170	8.05
Total votes		2,112	100.00
Registered voters/turnout		4,968	42.51

№5 Ceadîr-Lunga
Candidate	Party	Votes	%
Dmitri Chiseev	Independent	515	27.55
Andrei Mihailov	Independent	469	25.09
Nicolai Ivanciuc	Independent	375	20.06
Oxana Constantinova	Party of Socialists of the Republic of Moldova	284	15.20
Victor Topciu	Independent	226	12.09
Total		1,869	100.00
Valid votes		1,869	96.84
Invalid/blank votes		61	3.16
Total votes		1,930	100.00
Registered voters/turnout		5,325	36.24

№6 Ceadîr-Lunga
Candidate	Party	Votes	%
Gheorghi Leiciu	Independent	944	48.09
Natalia Mihalciuc	Independent	774	39.43
Anatoli Culev	Party of Socialists of the Republic of Moldova	213	10.85
Ivan Meșe	Gagauz People's Party	32	1.63
Total		1,963	100.00
Valid votes		1,963	96.27
Invalid/blank votes		76	3.73
Total votes		2,039	100.00
Registered voters/turnout		5,694	35.81

№7 Ceadîr-Lunga
Candidate	Party	Votes	%
Victor Topal	Independent	864	43.75
Elena Iurcenco	Party of Socialists of the Republic of Moldova	802	40.61
Liudmila Karadag	Independent	309	15.65
Total		1,975	100.00
Valid votes		1,975	92.64
Invalid/blank votes		157	7.36
Total votes		2,132	100.00
Registered voters/turnout		6,510	32.75

№8 Vulcănești
Candidate	Party	Votes	%
Alexandr Toporaș	Party of Socialists of the Republic of Moldova	626	38.76
Oleg Toporaș	For the Country	403	24.95
Serghei Delistoian	Independent	363	22.48
Olesea Mocan	Independent	159	9.85
Ștefan Grecu	Moldovans Alliance	64	3.96
Total		1,615	100.00
Valid votes		1,615	94.39
Invalid/blank votes		96	5.61
Total votes		1,711	100.00
Registered voters/turnout		4,295	39.84

№9 Vulcănești
Candidate	Party	Votes	%
Cornel Dudnic	Independent	614	37.28
Sergiu Ponomarenco	Party of Socialists of the Republic of Moldova	532	32.30
Mihail Savastin	Independent	324	19.67
Oleg Milcov	Moldovans Alliance	177	10.75
Total		1,647	100.00
Valid votes		1,647	93.95
Invalid/blank votes		106	6.05
Total votes		1,753	100.00
Registered voters/turnout		4,716	37.17

№10 Vulcănești
Candidate	Party	Votes	%
Piotr Fazlî	Party of Socialists of the Republic of Moldova	720	55.38
Roman Tiutin	Moldovans Alliance	580	44.62
Total		1,300	100.00
Valid votes		1,300	89.29
Invalid/blank votes		156	10.71
Total votes		1,456	100.00
Registered voters/turnout		4,635	31.41

№11 Avdarma
Candidate	Party	Votes	%
Ecaterina Grec	Independent	439	42.25
Dmitri Caramit	Party of Socialists of the Republic of Moldova	365	35.13
Alexandr Dinjos	Independent	151	14.53
Vitali Guna	Independent	84	8.08
Total		1,039	100.00
Valid votes		1,039	97.74
Invalid/blank votes		24	2.26
Total votes		1,063	100.00
Registered voters/turnout		2,730	38.94

№12 Baurci
Candidate	Party	Votes	%
Gheorghe Chiosea	Independent	798	47.99
Grigorii Cadîn	Independent	506	30.43
Serghei Dimitrioglo	Moldovans Alliance	359	21.59
Total		1,663	100.00
Valid votes		1,663	98.34
Invalid/blank votes		28	1.66
Total votes		1,691	100.00
Registered voters/turnout		6,885	24.56

№13 Beșalma
Candidate	Party	Votes	%
Grigori Diulgher	Independent	611	51.39
Gheorghi Chiosea	Party of Socialists of the Republic of Moldova	578	48.61
Total		1,189	100.00
Valid votes		1,189	98.26
Invalid/blank votes		21	1.74
Total votes		1,210	100.00
Registered voters/turnout		3,727	32.47

№14 Beșghioz
Candidate	Party	Votes	%
Vitalie Bratan	Party of Socialists of the Republic of Moldova	426	46.15
Maria Seiz	Independent	310	33.59
Mihail Molla	Independent	187	20.26
Total		923	100.00
Valid votes		923	98.09
Invalid/blank votes		18	1.91
Total votes		941	100.00
Registered voters/turnout		2,546	36.96

№15 Bugeac
Candidate	Party	Votes	%
Alexandr Panov	Independent	408	52.31
Vladimir Cîssa	Independent	372	47.69
Total		780	100.00
Valid votes		780	97.62
Invalid/blank votes		19	2.38
Total votes		799	100.00
Registered voters/turnout		1,367	58.45

№16 Cișmichioi
Candidate	Party	Votes	%
Andrei Stoianov	Party of Socialists of the Republic of Moldova	696	49.86
Dmitri Ianul	Independent	468	33.52
Gheorghi Boev	Independent	232	16.62
Total		1,396	100.00
Valid votes		1,396	97.42
Invalid/blank votes		37	2.58
Total votes		1,433	100.00
Registered voters/turnout		3,758	38.13

№17 Cioc-Maidan
Candidate	Party	Votes	%
Piotr Ianioglo	Independent	751	64.74
Anatoli Plucci	Independent	409	35.26
Total		1,160	100.00
Valid votes		1,160	98.81
Invalid/blank votes		14	1.19
Total votes		1,174	100.00
Registered voters/turnout		2,778	42.26

№18 Dezghingea
Candidate	Party	Votes	%
Nicolai Raia	Independent	944	58.45
Nicolai Chireacov	Party of Socialists of the Republic of Moldova	433	26.81
Andrei Sarî	Independent	183	11.33
Dmitri Capsamun	Gagauz People's Party	55	3.41
Total		1,615	100.00
Valid votes		1,615	98.48
Invalid/blank votes		25	1.52
Total votes		1,640	100.00
Registered voters/turnout		4,138	39.63

№19 Joltai
Candidate	Party	Votes	%
Nicolai Andrușoi	Independent	411	59.57
Iurii Cambur	Party of Socialists of the Republic of Moldova	279	40.43
Total		690	100.00
Valid votes		690	98.29
Invalid/blank votes		12	1.71
Total votes		702	100.00
Registered voters/turnout		1,714	40.96

№20 Etulia
Candidate	Party	Votes	%
Mihail Popov	Party of Socialists of the Republic of Moldova	460	37.99
Anna Mînzat	Moldovans Alliance	326	26.92
Serghei Cuidjuclu	Independent	301	24.86
Kateryna Serbinova	For the Country	124	10.24
Total		1,211	100.00
Valid votes		1,211	97.11
Invalid/blank votes		36	2.89
Total votes		1,247	100.00
Registered voters/turnout		2,674	46.63

№21 Ferapontievca
Candidate	Party	Votes	%
Elvira Petcoglo	Independent	156	43.33
Vitali Cebanu	Independent	113	31.39
Mariana Miziuc	Party of Socialists of the Republic of Moldova	78	21.67
Alexandr Odnostalco	Moldovans Alliance	13	3.61
Total		360	100.00
Valid votes		360	96.51
Invalid/blank votes		13	3.49
Total votes		373	100.00
Registered voters/turnout		851	43.83

№22 Gaidar
Candidate	Party	Votes	%
Gheorghi Bejenar	Independent	749	62.11
Ivan Cebotari	Independent	279	23.13
Ivan Topal	Independent	178	14.76
Total		1,206	100.00
Valid votes		1,206	97.26
Invalid/blank votes		34	2.74
Total votes		1,240	100.00
Registered voters/turnout		3,362	36.88

№23 Carbalia
Candidate	Party	Votes	%
Nicolae Untu	Party of Socialists of the Republic of Moldova	106	51.71
Vasilisa Dermenji	Independent	90	43.90
Maria Dermenji	Moldovans Alliance	5	2.44
Oleg Gaidarji	Gagauz People's Party	4	1.95
Total		205	100.00
Valid votes		205	100.00
Invalid/blank votes		0	0.00
Total votes		205	100.00
Registered voters/turnout		402	51.00

№24 Cazaclia
Candidate	Party	Votes	%
Alexandr Diulgher	Independent	1,521	67.60
Anatoli Uzun	Independent	521	23.16
Elena Momat	Independent	208	9.24
Total		2,250	100.00
Valid votes		2,250	95.38
Invalid/blank votes		109	4.62
Total votes		2,359	100.00
Registered voters/turnout		5,587	42.22

№25 Chiriet-Lunga
Candidate	Party	Votes	%
Ivan Burgudji	Independent	374	53.43
Gheorghi Cuiudjuclu	Independent	270	38.57
Vladimir Jelezoglo	Independent	41	5.86
Nicolai Tașoglo	Gagauz People's Party	15	2.14
Total		700	100.00
Valid votes		700	98.73
Invalid/blank votes		9	1.27
Total votes		709	100.00
Registered voters/turnout		1,850	38.32

№26 Chirsova
Candidate	Party	Votes	%
Stepan Piron	Independent	645	32.36
Stepan Sarioglo	Independent	537	26.94
Vladimir Tomailî	Party of Socialists of the Republic of Moldova	246	12.34
Vasile Stoinov	Independent	234	11.74
Stepan Coroleac	Independent	159	7.98
Edgar Dimov	Independent	127	6.37
Victor Zlatovcen	Independent	45	2.26
Total		1,993	100.00
Valid votes		1,993	97.89
Invalid/blank votes		43	2.11
Total votes		2,036	100.00
Registered voters/turnout		5,715	35.63

№27 Congaz
Candidate	Party	Votes	%
Mihail Caraseni	Independent	495	27.32
Stepan Arnaut	Party of Socialists of the Republic of Moldova	440	24.28
Vasili Iasîbaș	Independent	416	22.96
Ivan Bessarab	Independent	385	21.25
Iordan Iasîbaș	Gagauz People's Party	76	4.19
Total		1,812	100.00
Valid votes		1,812	96.38
Invalid/blank votes		68	3.62
Total votes		1,880	100.00
Registered voters/turnout		5,685	33.07

№28 Congaz
Candidate	Party	Votes	%
Gavril Tulba	Independent	746	46.86
Stepan Manolov	Independent	437	27.45
Vitali Chiurcciu	Independent	234	14.70
Anna Statova	Independent	175	10.99
Total		1,592	100.00
Valid votes		1,592	98.39
Invalid/blank votes		26	1.61
Total votes		1,618	100.00
Registered voters/turnout		4,705	34.39

№29 Congazcicul de Sus
Candidate	Party	Votes	%
Dmitri Chiciuc	Party of Socialists of the Republic of Moldova	529	66.54
Serghei Zaharia	Independent	206	25.91
Lidia Ostaș	Independent	60	7.55
Total		795	100.00
Valid votes		795	97.43
Invalid/blank votes		21	2.57
Total votes		816	100.00
Registered voters/turnout		1,772	46.05

№30 Copceac
Candidate	Party	Votes	%
Oleg Garizan	Independent	460	29.97
Valeri Colioglo	Independent	382	24.89
Ecaterina Franjeva	Party of Socialists of the Republic of Moldova	367	23.91
Serghei Iusiumbeli	Independent	138	8.99
Valeriu Manastîrlî	Independent	114	7.43
Evgheni Murzacoi	Independent	74	4.82
Total		1,535	100.00
Valid votes		1,535	96.66
Invalid/blank votes		53	3.34
Total votes		1,588	100.00
Registered voters/turnout		4,337	36.62

№31 Copceac
Candidate	Party	Votes	%
Dmitri Manastîrlî	Independent	664	57.29
Veaceslav Sacalî	Independent	209	18.03
Serghei Garizan	Independent	122	10.53
Alexandr Galațan	Independent	111	9.58
Vitali Arnaut	Independent	53	4.57
Total		1,159	100.00
Valid votes		1,159	98.81
Invalid/blank votes		14	1.19
Total votes		1,173	100.00
Registered voters/turnout		3,248	36.11

№32 Cotovscoe
Candidate	Party	Votes	%
Nicolai Ormanji	Independent	173	47.53
Fiodor Tatar	Independent	99	27.20
Svetlana Reguș	Independent	62	17.03
Dmitri Guci	National Alternative Movement	16	4.40
Nicolai Sarioglo	Independent	14	3.85
Total		364	100.00
Valid votes		364	99.73
Invalid/blank votes		1	0.27
Total votes		365	100.00
Registered voters/turnout		746	48.93

№33 Chioselia Rusă
Candidate	Party	Votes	%
Nicolai Delibaltov	Independent	237	100.00
Total		237	100.00
Valid votes		237	97.53
Invalid/blank votes		6	2.47
Total votes		243	100.00
Registered voters/turnout		591	41.12

№34 Svetlîi
Candidate	Party	Votes	%
Valeri Curchin	Independent	260	41.14
Ruslan Unilovschi	Independent	145	22.94
Oleg Makedonski	Independent	117	18.51
Dmitri Ceachir	Party of Socialists of the Republic of Moldova	110	17.41
Total		632	100.00
Valid votes		632	97.83
Invalid/blank votes		14	2.17
Total votes		646	100.00
Registered voters/turnout		1,664	38.82

№35 Tomai
Candidate	Party	Votes	%
Igor Ianac	Independent	470	37.27
Oxana Nedealco-Calîn	Independent	439	34.81
Maria Stamat	Party of Socialists of the Republic of Moldova	311	24.66
Dmitri Balaban	Independent	41	3.25
Total		1,261	100.00
Valid votes		1,261	97.98
Invalid/blank votes		26	2.02
Total votes		1,287	100.00
Registered voters/turnout		4,041	31.85
