= Fiodor Gagauz =

Moldovan politician and lawyer (born 1958)

- Fiodor Gagauz in 2013

Personal details
- Born: 23 October 1958 (age 68) Gaidar, Moldova

Fiodor Gagauz (born 23 October 1958) is a Moldovan politician, lawyer and former police officer of Gagauz origin. He served as a member of the Parliament of the Republic of Moldova from 2014 to 2025, representing the Party of Socialists of the Republic of Moldova (PSRM) and subsequently the Electoral Bloc of Communists and Socialists. He previously served as a member of the People's Assembly of Gagauzia and headed the Department of Internal Affairs of Gagauzia. In 2026, he became a candidate for the position of Bashkan of Gagauzia, nominated by the Party of Socialists of the Republic of Moldova.

== Early life and education ==
Fiodor Gagauz was born on 23 October 1958 in the village of Gaidar, in what is now the Autonomous Territorial Unit of Gagauzia, Moldova.

He studied law in Kyiv between 1986 and 1991. In 1998, he obtained a master's degree in public administration.

== Career ==
=== Law enforcement ===
Gagauz worked in the internal affairs bodies of the Republic of Moldova for approximately two decades, from 1982 to 2002, holding various managerial positions. From 1999 to 2001, he headed the Department of Internal Affairs of Gagauzia.

He attained the rank of police colonel. From 2001, he also worked as a lecturer at Comrat State University, where he taught at the Faculty of Law.

=== Political career ===
Gagauz entered regional politics in the early 2000s. In 2006, he became associated with the civic movement Edinaya Gagauziya (United Gagauzia), which he subsequently led.

In 2012, he was elected to the People's Assembly of Gagauzia, the legislative body of the autonomous territorial unit, where he served until 2014.

In the 2014 Moldovan parliamentary election, Gagauz was elected to the Parliament of the Republic of Moldova on the list of the Party of Socialists of the Republic of Moldova. He retained his seat following the 2019 parliamentary election and the 2021 snap parliamentary election, in which he ran on the list of the Electoral Bloc of Communists and Socialists.

During the 11th legislature, he was a member of the parliamentary faction of the Electoral Bloc of Communists and Socialists and served on the Committee on National Security, Defence and Public Order.

His parliamentary mandate ended in 2025. He did not appear on any electoral list in the 2025 parliamentary election.

=== 2026 Bashkan election ===
In 2026, Gagauz announced his intention to run for the position of Bashkan of Gagauzia, the head of the autonomous territorial unit. He was nominated by the Party of Socialists of the Republic of Moldova.

The Central Electoral Council of Gagauzia registered his candidacy on 1 October 2026. He was placed first on the ballot for the election held on 15 November 2026.

In the first round, Gagauz received 11,426 votes, representing 24.22% of the valid votes, and finished second behind independent candidate Alexandr Stoianoglo, who received 38.44%. As no candidate secured an absolute majority, Gagauz qualified for the second round, scheduled for 29 November 2026.

== Political positions and controversies ==
Gagauz has advocated for strengthening the autonomy of Gagauzia and has supported proposals to federalise the Republic of Moldova. His political activities have included support for closer relations with Russia.

In 2014, he supported a referendum organised in Gagauzia concerning the region's geopolitical orientation and its right to external self-determination. The referendum was declared unconstitutional by the Moldovan authorities.

An investigation published by RISE Moldova reported that, during his parliamentary career, Gagauz sought financial assistance from Russian organisations for churches in Gagauzia. According to the investigation, in 2018 he presented a certificate worth 500,000 Russian roubles to a church in Vulcănești, describing it as a gift from the authorities in Moscow.

== Personal life ==
Gagauz is married and has two children.
