= Comrat =

Comrat Komrat
- Municipality
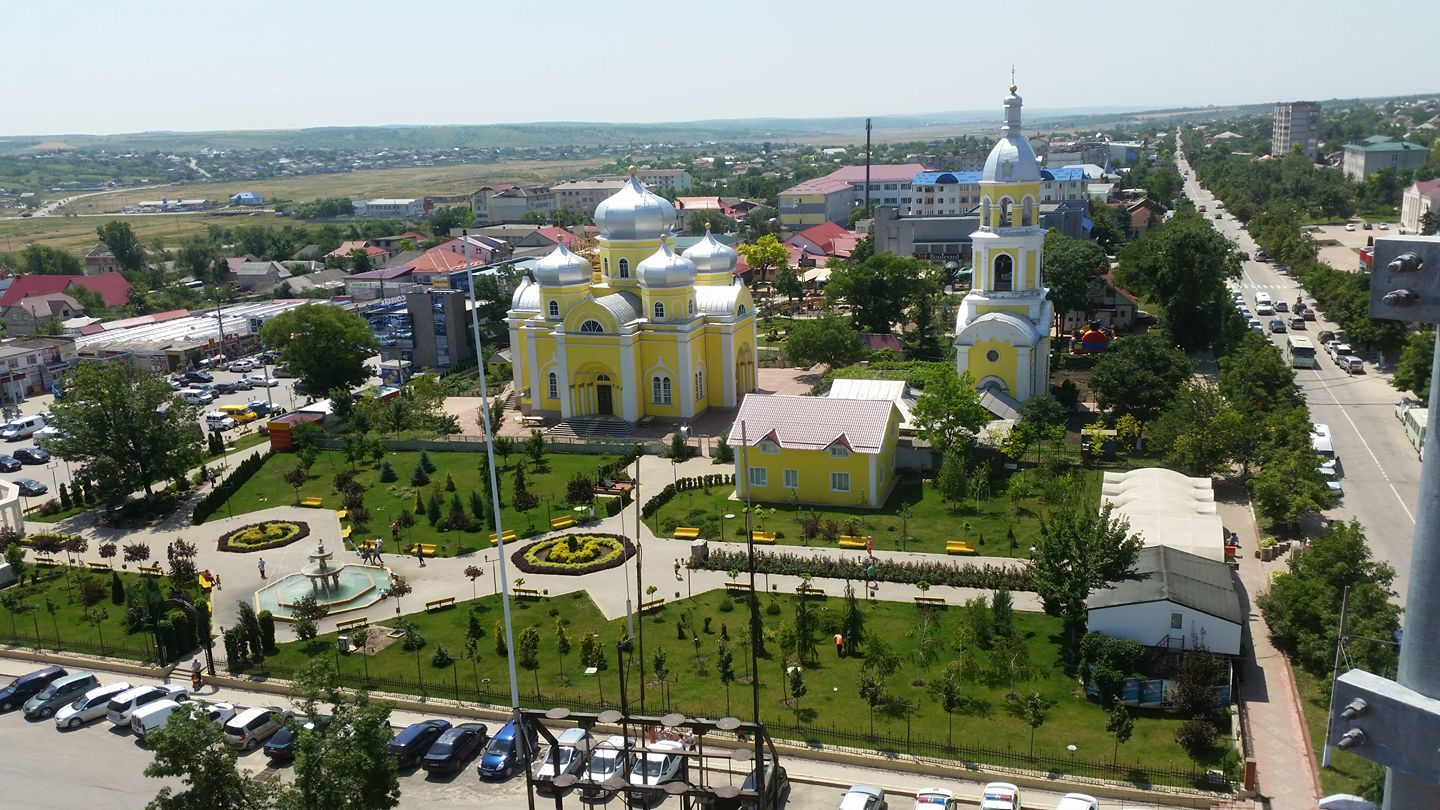
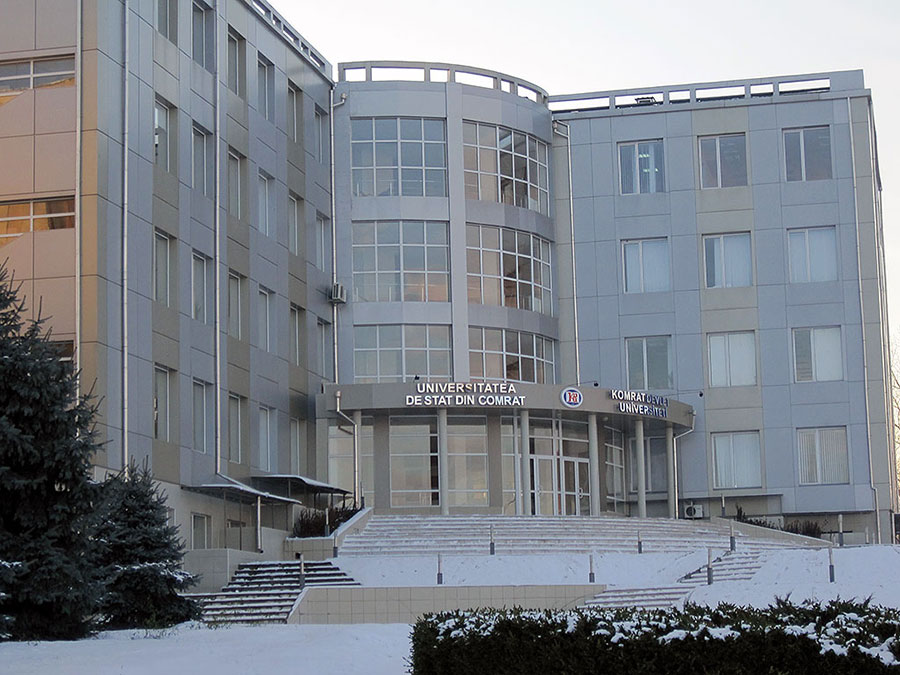
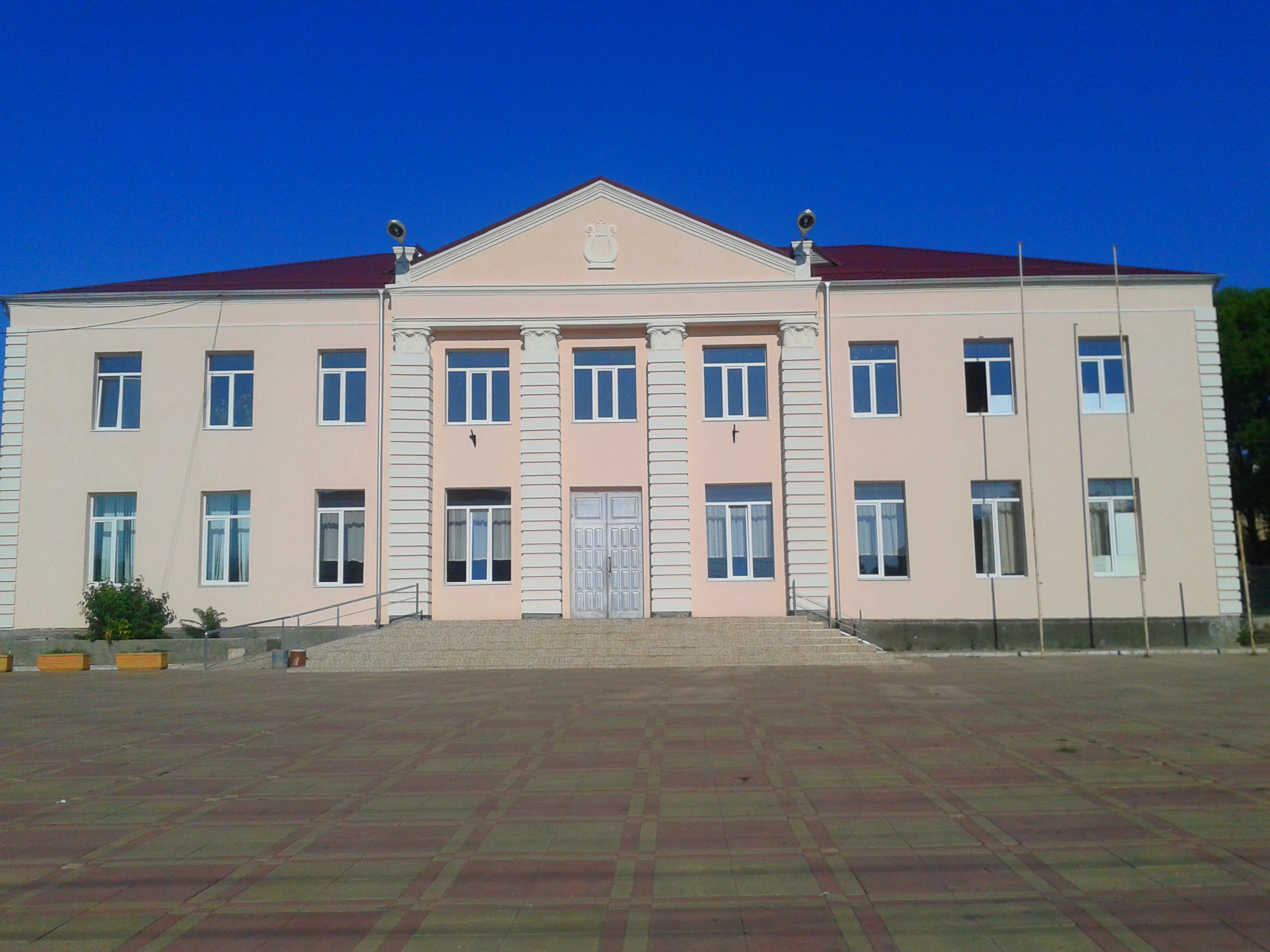
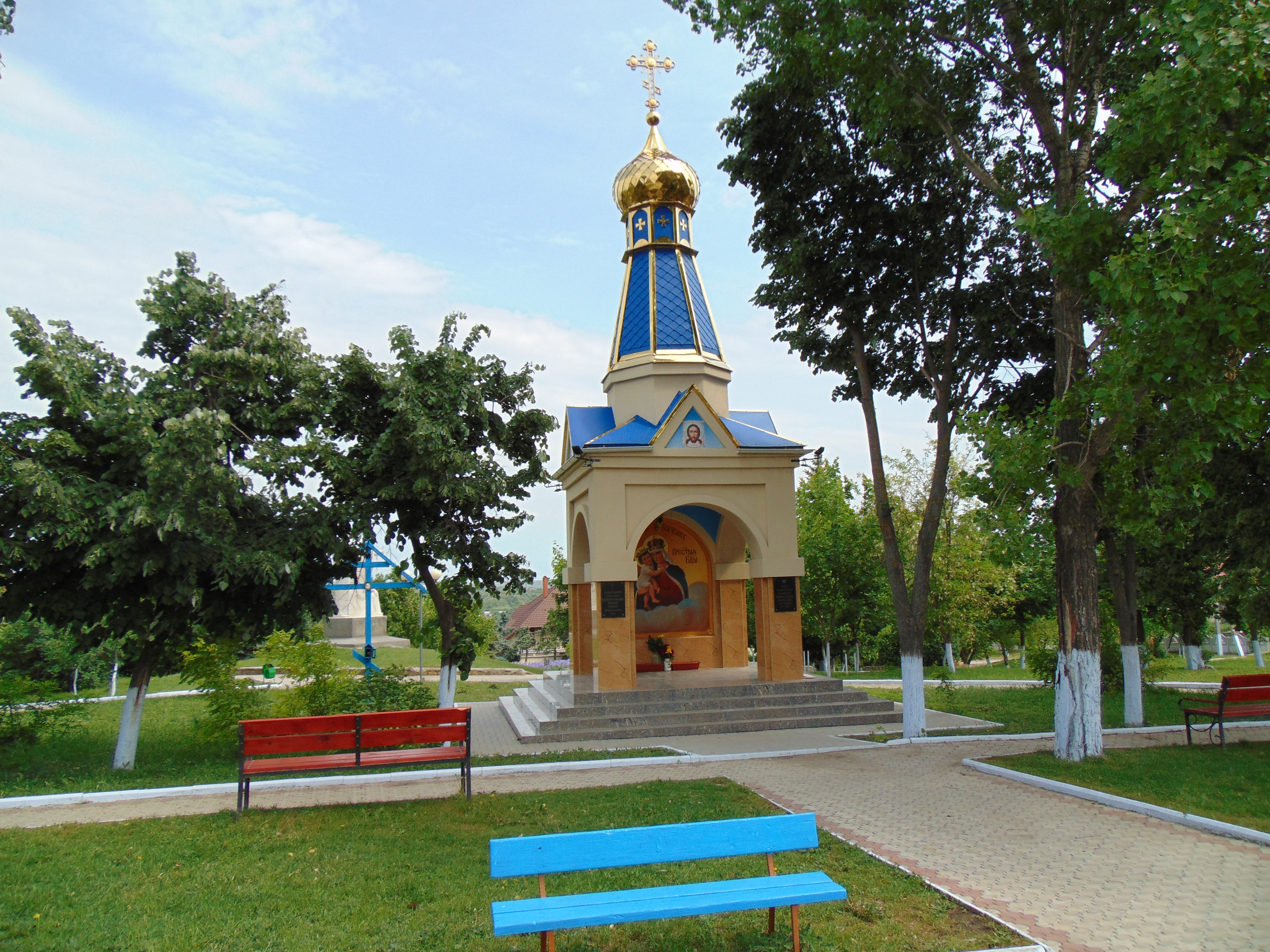
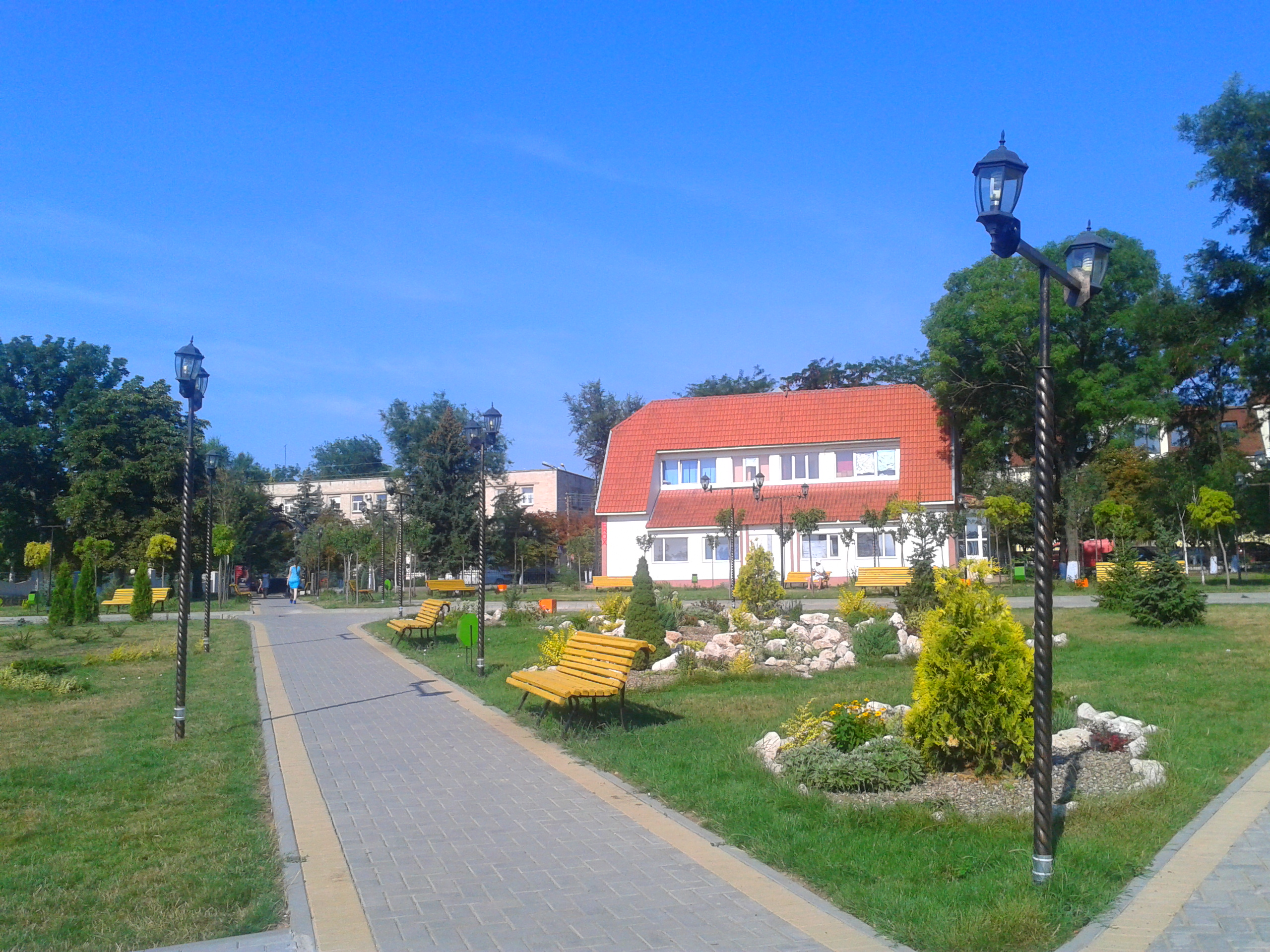
- From top, left to right: Saint John the Baptist Cathedral; Comrat State University; House of Culture; Chapel; Central Park

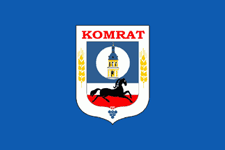
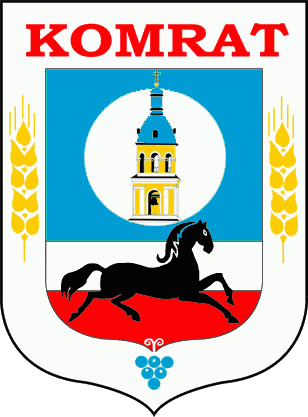
- Flag Seal
- Interactive map of Comrat
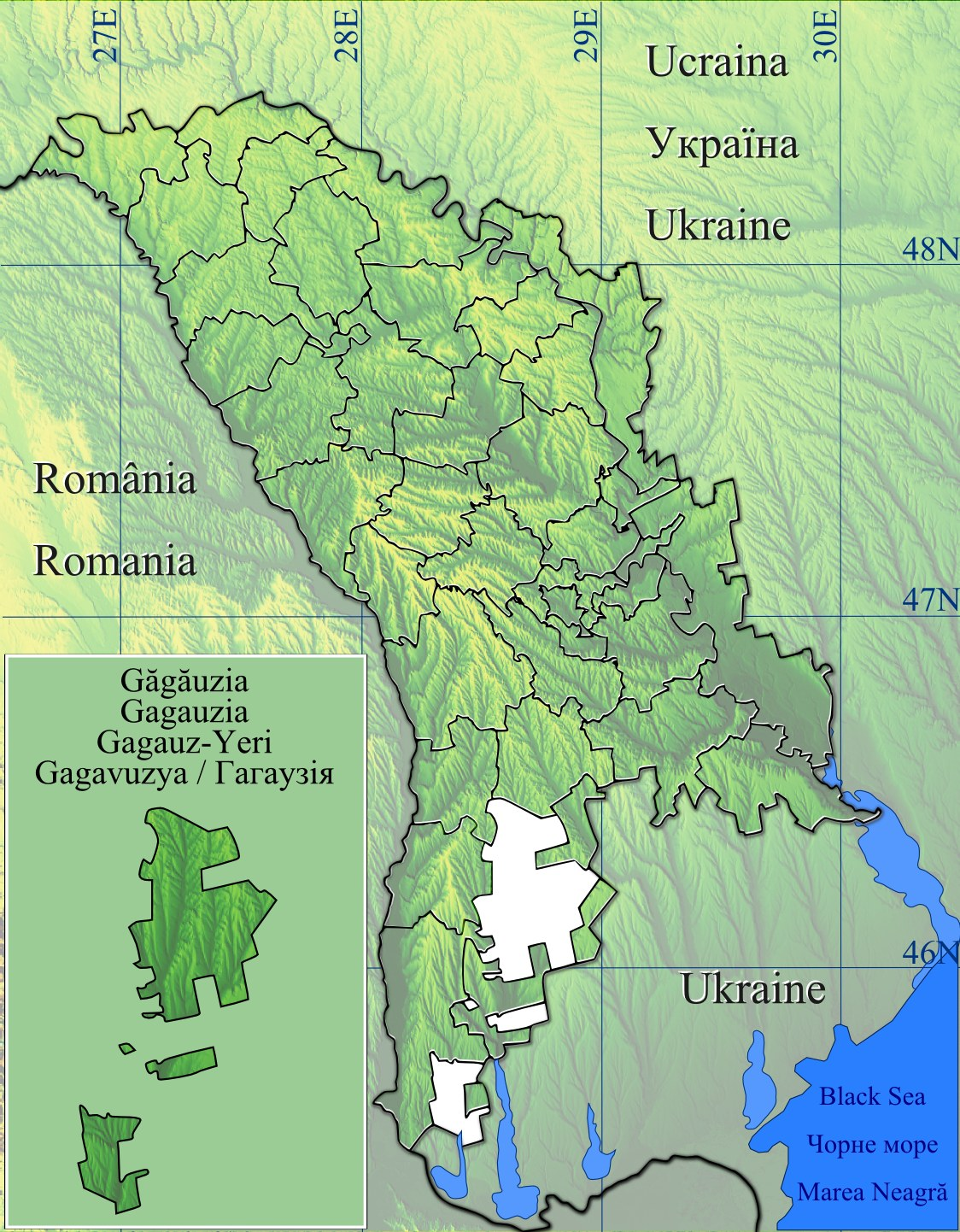
- Location of Comrat in Moldova Comrat (Moldova)
- Coordinates: 46°19′N 28°40′E
- Country: Moldova
- Autonomous Region: Gagauzia
- Founded: 1443/1789

Government
  - Mayor: Sergey Anastasov

Area
  - Total: 164 km^{2} (63 sq mi)

Population (2024)
  - Total: 19,120
  - Density: 117/km^{2} (302/sq mi)

Ethnicity (2024 census)
  - Gagauz people: 73.5%
  - Moldovans: 10.8%
  - other: 15.7%
- Time zone: UTC+2 (EET)
  - Summer (DST): UTC+3 (EEST)
- Climate: Cfb
- Website: comrat.md

Comrat (Romanian: Comrat, Romanian pronunciation: [komˈrat]; Gagauz: Komrat, Russian: Комрат) is a city and municipality in Moldova and the capital city of the autonomous region of Gagauzia. It is located in the south of the country, on the Ialpug River. The vast majority of the inhabitants are Gagauz.

== History ==
Remains of human activity belonging to the Chernyakhov culture and burial mounds of the Yamnaya culture have been found in the area. Archeological sites found in the area from the bronze age have been generally attributed to the Noua-Sabatinovka-Coslogeni complex.

=== Budjak Horde ===
The present day city of Comrat was a major settlement in the Budjak Horde, alongside Căușeni and Udobne. The name of the settlement is thought to come from the Gagauz word for a black horse (Gagauz: Kömür at), the symbol of the town and a sign of wealth for Nogai-Tatars.

In 1775 a settlement called "Cumrad" was depicted in the area of the present day city on map of Moldova by F. W. Bauer.

=== Russian period ===
Following the Russian annexation of the area after the Russo-Turkish War (1806–1812) the local Tatars and Turks were expelled from the region and the new Russian government issued a decree in 1819 to resettle the region with various nationalities from across the Danube.

Majority of people who settled in Comrat were Gagauz and Bulgarians as refugees from the Ottoman Empire, mainly from southern Bulgaria and the Varna region. A minority of Moldovans, Ukrainians, Greeks and others also came to inhabit the area. Since the reorganized Bessarabia Governorate was included in the Pale of Settlement, a small Jewish minority also sprung up in settlement.

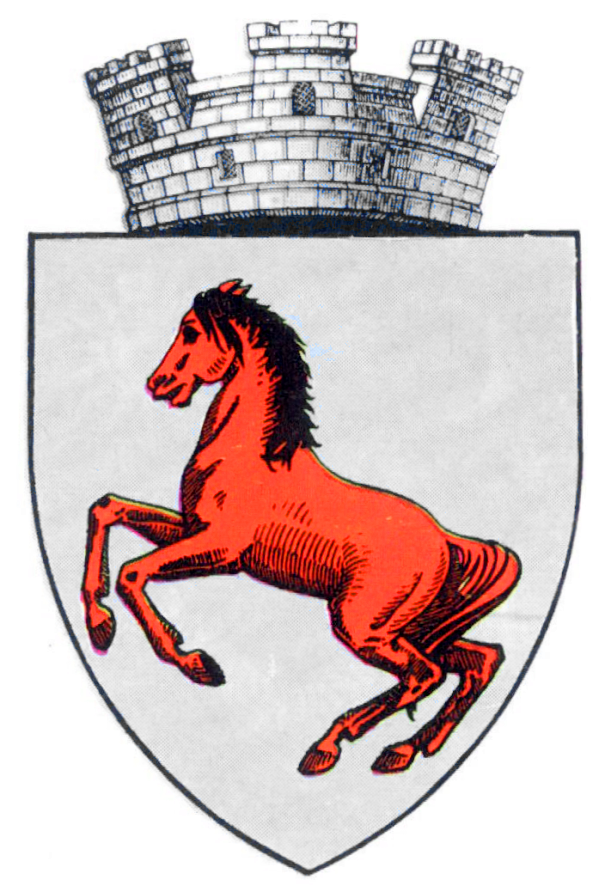
The first seal of Comrat (1932–2005)

By the end of the 19th century Comrat still held the status of a village and in 1892 the local Jewish community petitioned the authorities to change it to a shtetl, which was left unanswered. Russian ethnographer A. V. Moshkov at the time described Comrat as such: "Kamrat (Comrat), a large trading village with 10,000 residents, jokingly called the "capital of the Gagauz" by local Russians, is considered the center of all Gagauz colonies,".

=== 20th century ===
In 1906, the village revolted against the Russian authorities and proclaimed the autonomous (but not independent) Comrat Republic. Following World War I, it was part of Kingdom of Romania. During this time it was in the Tighina County and in 1926 it was given the status of a town. Due to this new title it was required that the town have its own seal. Designed by Emmanuel Hadji-Mosco, Dionisie Pecurariu and was adopted on September 30, 1932. It was occupied by the Soviet Union in 1940, before it was briefly recaptured by Romania in 1941.

In 1941, a decree of the Supreme Soviet of the MSSR was issued, according to which Comrat was divided into three village councils: Comrat, New-Comrat and the village of Yalpug. A decision was taken on September 13, 1957 to reunite the settlements. During the time when the town was part of Moldavian SSR, Comrat's industry was geared toward the production of butter, wine, and rugs, the latter decorated with Moldavian motifs.

=== Present day ===
Following the fall of the Soviet Union, from 1989 to 1995 it was the capital of the self proclaimed and unrecognised Gagauz Republic.

Today it is the capital of the Autonomous Territorial Unit of Gagauzia (Gagauz-Yeri) and where the Executive Committee of Gagauzia is based.

In 2002 the Comrat State University was established.

== Demographics ==
Historical population
Year	Pop.	±%
1827	1,541	—
1847	3,926	+154.8%
1857	4,469	+13.8%
1930	12,331	+175.9%
1943	12,213	−1.0%
1959	14,361	+17.6%
1970	21,369	+48.8%
1979	23,652	+10.7%
1989	25,822	+9.2%
2004	23,327	−9.7%
2014	20,113	−13.8%
2024	19,120	−4.9%

According to the 2024 Moldovan census, 19,120 inhabitants lived in Comrat, a decrease compared to the previous census in 2014, when 20,113 inhabitants were registered. It is the primate and most populous city in Gagauzia, as well as the 11th biggest city in Moldova.

Although Gagauz is the official language of Comrat, around 12,192 (63.76%) people in Comrat speak Gagauz as their mother-tongue, while 4,358 (22.79%) speak Russian.

The vast majority of people in Comrat are religious, with the vast majortiy, 18,434 (96.41%) inhabitants confessing Eastern Orthodoxy.

Ethnic composition of Comrat (2024)
Ethnic group	Population	% Percentage
Gagauz	14,061	73.54%
Moldovans (Note: There is an ongoing controversy regarding the ethnic identification of Moldovans and Romanians.)	2,065	10.8%
Romanians	27	0.14%
Bulgarians	1,048	5.48%
Russians	890	4.65%
Ukrainians	694	3.63%
Romani	105	0.55%
Others	230	1.21%
Total	19,120	100%

== Economy ==
Comrat is situated in the southern wine zone of Moldova. It is known for production of red wine and muscat. In Comrat and its suburbs there are about 10 wineries.

Food production is very developed in the city. Comrat is a home for food processing factories, alcohol production, and an oil processing plant (the first and only one in Moldova).

There is also such economic agents as a ferro-concrete factory, furniture productions, wood processing, production of plastic windows and doors, cattle butcheries, and transport companies.

== Sport ==
Two football clubs: FC Olimp Comrat and CF Univer Comrat are based in Comrat, specifically the Victor Mumjiev Stadium.

== Geography ==
=== Climate ===
Comrat has a humid continental climate (Dfa), characterized by warm summers and cool, drier winters with snow. Winter lows are often below 0 °C (32 °F). In summer, the average maximum temperature is approximately 28 °C (82 °F). The average annual precipitation is relatively low.

Climate data for Comrat (1991–2020, extremes 1897–present)
Month	Jan	Feb	Mar	Apr	May	Jun	Jul	Aug	Sep	Oct	Nov	Dec	Year
Record high °C (°F)	17.4 (63.3)	21.7 (71.1)	27.9 (82.2)	31.4 (88.5)	35.7 (96.3)	38.2 (100.8)	40.8 (105.4)	40.0 (104.0)	36.6 (97.9)	33.3 (91.9)	29.0 (84.2)	17.4 (63.3)	40.8 (105.4)
Mean daily maximum °C (°F)	1.5 (34.7)	4.1 (39.4)	10.0 (50.0)	17.0 (62.6)	23.0 (73.4)	26.9 (80.4)	29.3 (84.7)	29.1 (84.4)	23.2 (73.8)	16.2 (61.2)	9.0 (48.2)	3.1 (37.6)	16.0 (60.8)
Daily mean °C (°F)	−1.7 (28.9)	0.1 (32.2)	4.8 (40.6)	11.0 (51.8)	16.8 (62.2)	20.9 (69.6)	23.1 (73.6)	22.8 (73.0)	17.3 (63.1)	11.1 (52.0)	5.2 (41.4)	−0.1 (31.8)	10.9 (51.6)
Mean daily minimum °C (°F)	−4.5 (23.9)	−3.1 (26.4)	0.7 (33.3)	5.9 (42.6)	11.2 (52.2)	15.4 (59.7)	17.4 (63.3)	17.1 (62.8)	12.2 (54.0)	7.0 (44.6)	2.2 (36.0)	−2.7 (27.1)	6.6 (43.9)
Record low °C (°F)	−25.6 (−14.1)	−28.1 (−18.6)	−18.3 (−0.9)	−8.1 (17.4)	−2.6 (27.3)	5.4 (41.7)	7.5 (45.5)	5.7 (42.3)	−4.9 (23.2)	−7.5 (18.5)	−16.8 (1.8)	−22.2 (−8.0)	−28.1 (−18.6)
Average precipitation mm (inches)	33 (1.3)	27 (1.1)	32 (1.3)	37 (1.5)	48 (1.9)	69 (2.7)	59 (2.3)	46 (1.8)	42 (1.7)	43 (1.7)	39 (1.5)	39 (1.5)	514 (20.2)
Average precipitation days (≥ 1.0 mm)	6	6	6	6	7	7	6	5	5	6	5	6	71
Average relative humidity (%)	84	82	76	66	64	65	63	63	67	73	83	86	73
Source 1: NOAA
Source 2: Serviciul Hidrometeorologic de Stat (extremes, relative humidity)

== Notable people ==
- Alexandru Bârlădeanu (1911–1997), Romanian Marxian economist
- Anatoliy Blashku (born 1944), Minister of Industry in Transnistria
- Igor Cobileanski (born 1974), Moldovan film director
- Mihai Cojusea (born 1978), Moldovan football player
- Dmitri Constantinov (born 1952), Moldovan politician and businessman
- Petar Draganov (1857–1928), Russian philologist and Slavist
- Sorana Gurian (1913–1956), Romanian writer, journalist, and translator
- Alexander Romanov (born 1990), Moldovan UFC heavyweight fighter
- Reuven Shari (1903–1989), Israeli politician
- Alexandr Stoianoglo (born 1967), Moldovan politician and member of the Parliament of Moldova
- Stepan Topal (1938–2018), Moldovan politician, former Governor Gagauzia, President of the Gagauz Republic
- Irina Vlah (born 1974), Moldovan politician, former Governor of Gagauzia
- Petru Vlah (born 1970), Moldovan lawyer, businessman and politician

== International relations ==
=== Twin towns — Sister cities ===
Comrat is twinned with:

- Altındağ, Turkey;
- Slănic-Moldova, Romania;
- Erzsébetváros, Budapest region, Hungary.
- Küçükkuyu, Ayvacık, Turkey;
- Tatlısu, Cyprus;
- Pendik, Istanbul region, Turkey;
- Hendek, Turkey;
- Kalecik, Ankara, Turkey;
- Sokolniki District, Russia;
- Dnestrovsc, Moldova; (Note: Transnistria's political status is disputed. It considers itself to be an independent state, but this is not recognised by any UN member state. The Moldovan government and the international community consider Transnistria a part of Moldova's territory.)
- Tiraspol, Moldova;
- Bălți, Moldova;
- Ceadîr-Lunga, Moldova;
- Bavly, Tatarstan, Russia;
- Sofia, Bulgaria;
- Yaroslavl, Russia;
- Bolhrad, Ukraine;
- Mangystau Region, Kazakhstan;
- Maltepe, Istanbul, Turkey;
- Taşköprü, Kastamonu, Turkey;
- Bryansk, Russia;
- Antalya, Turkey;
- Volokolamsk, Russia;
- Nizhnevartovsk, Russia;
- Galați, Romania;
- Çanakkale, Turkey;
- Hlybokaye, Belarus;
- Babruysk, Belarus;
- Niksar, Turkey;
- Tecuci, Romania;
- North Nicosia, Cyprus;
- Sapanca, Turkey;
- Isparta, Turkey;
- Grozny, Russia;

== Gallery ==
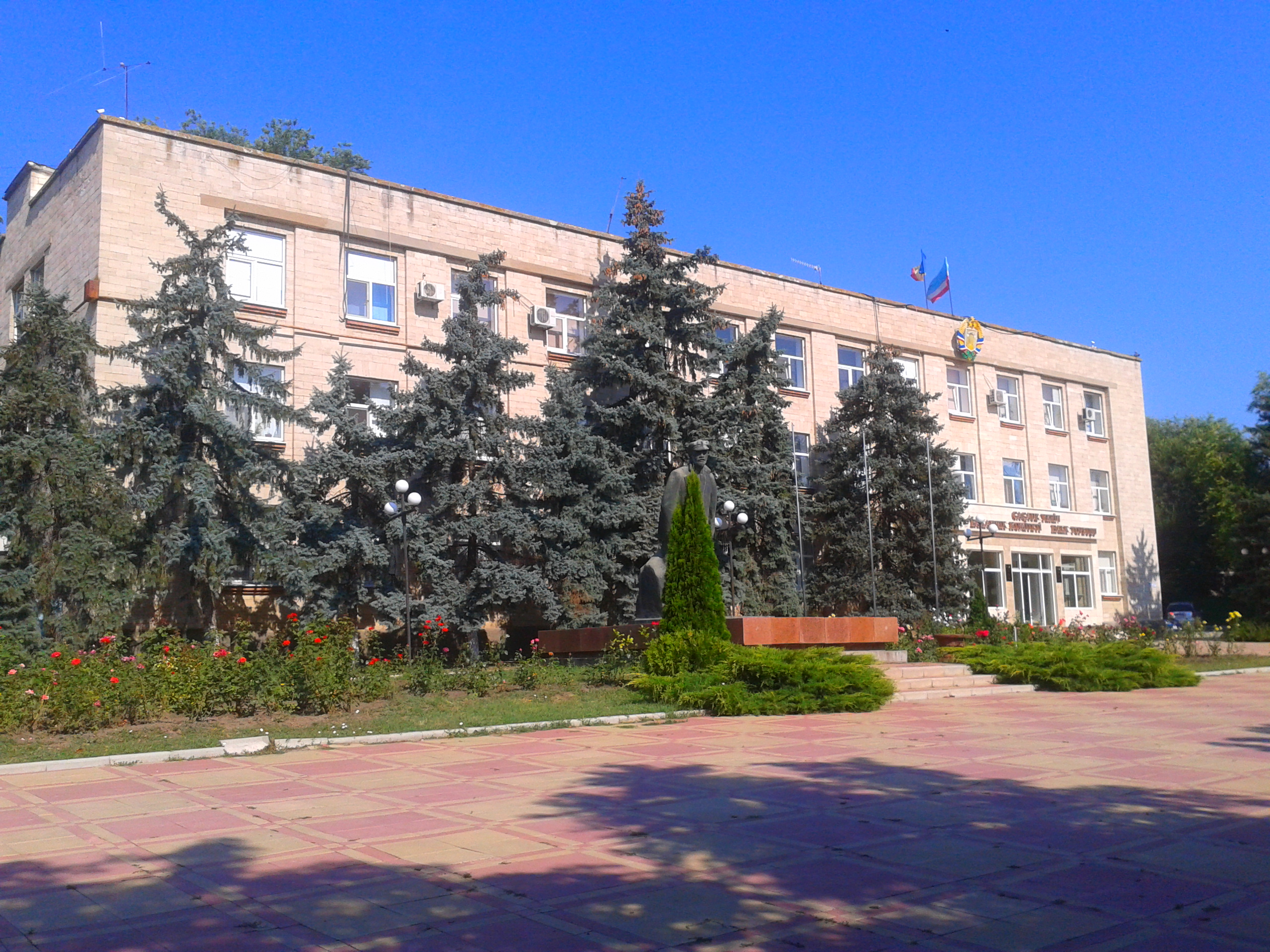
Executive Committee of Gagauzia

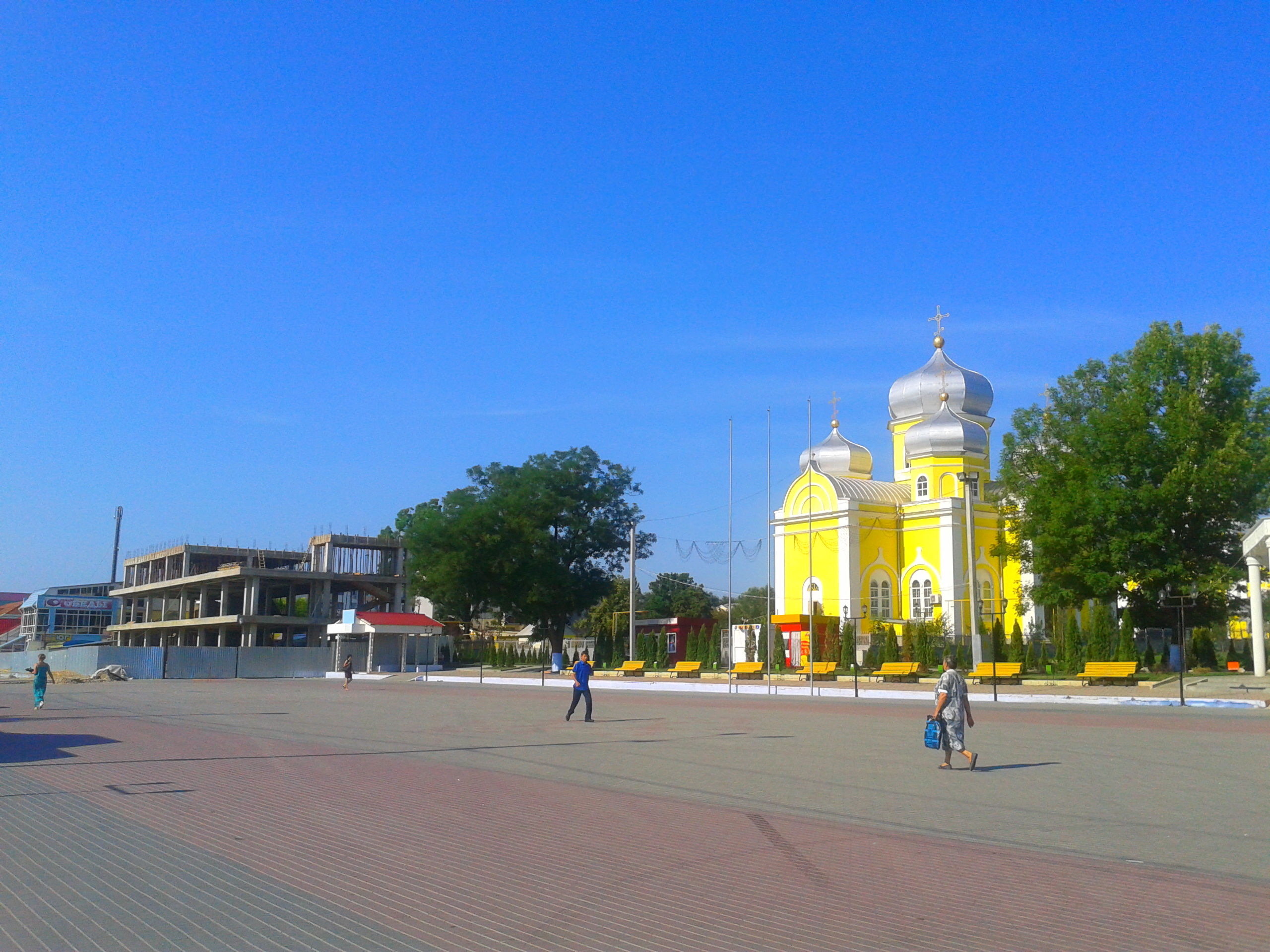
Central Square

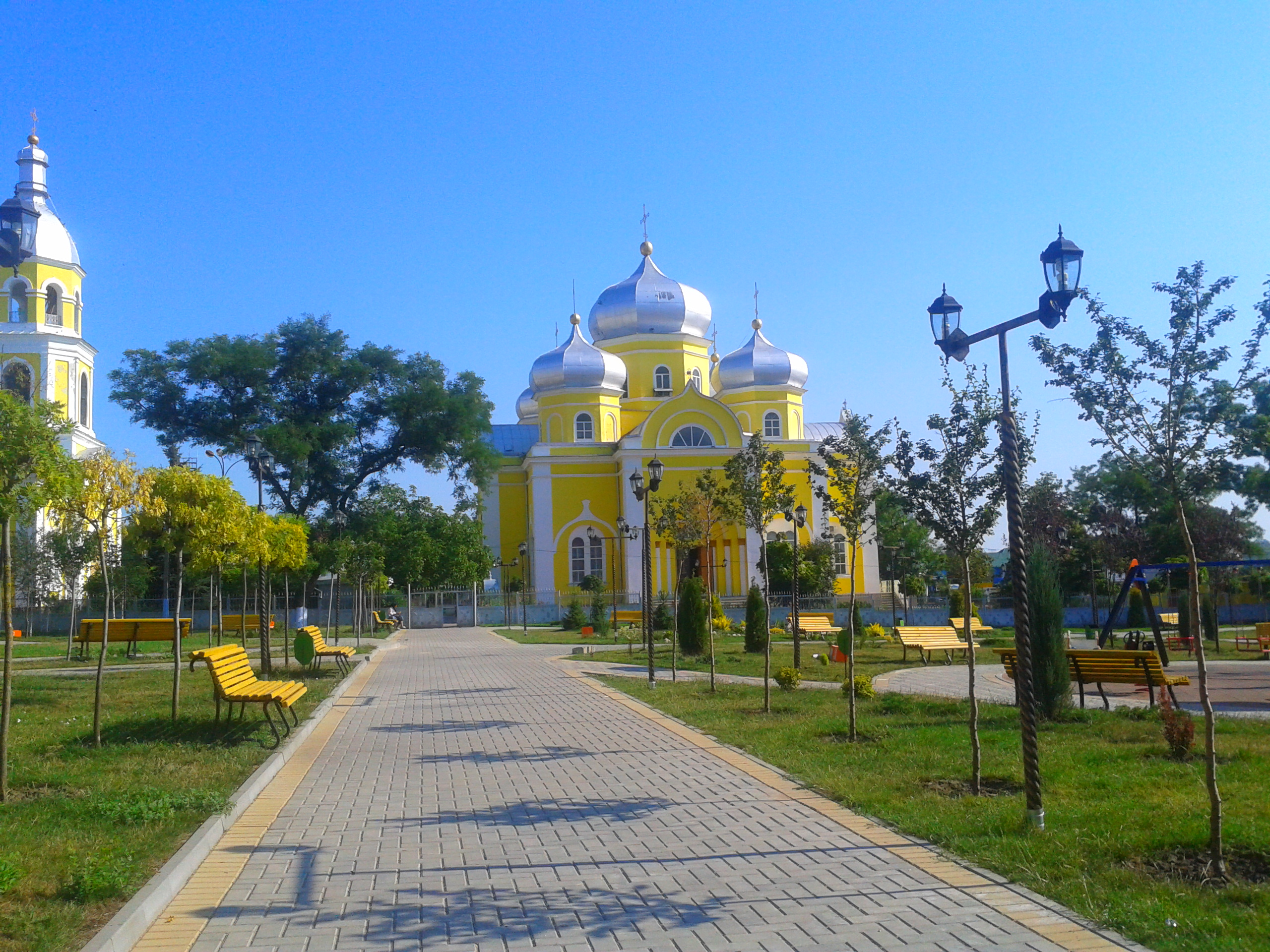
Central Park

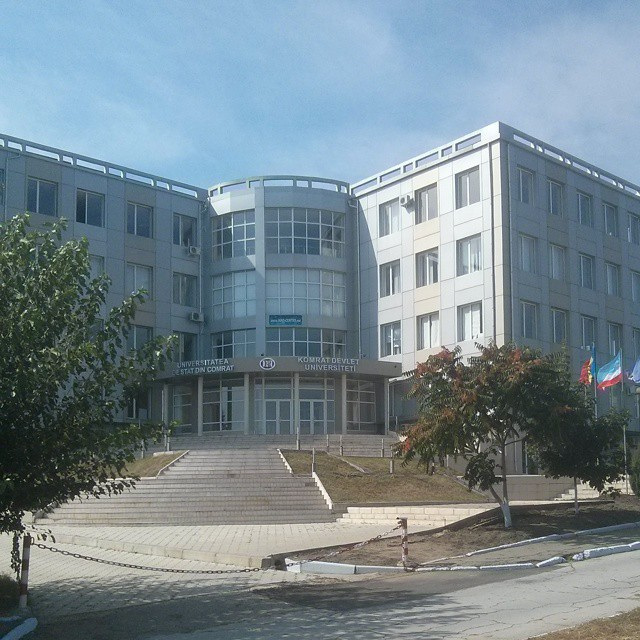
Comrat State University

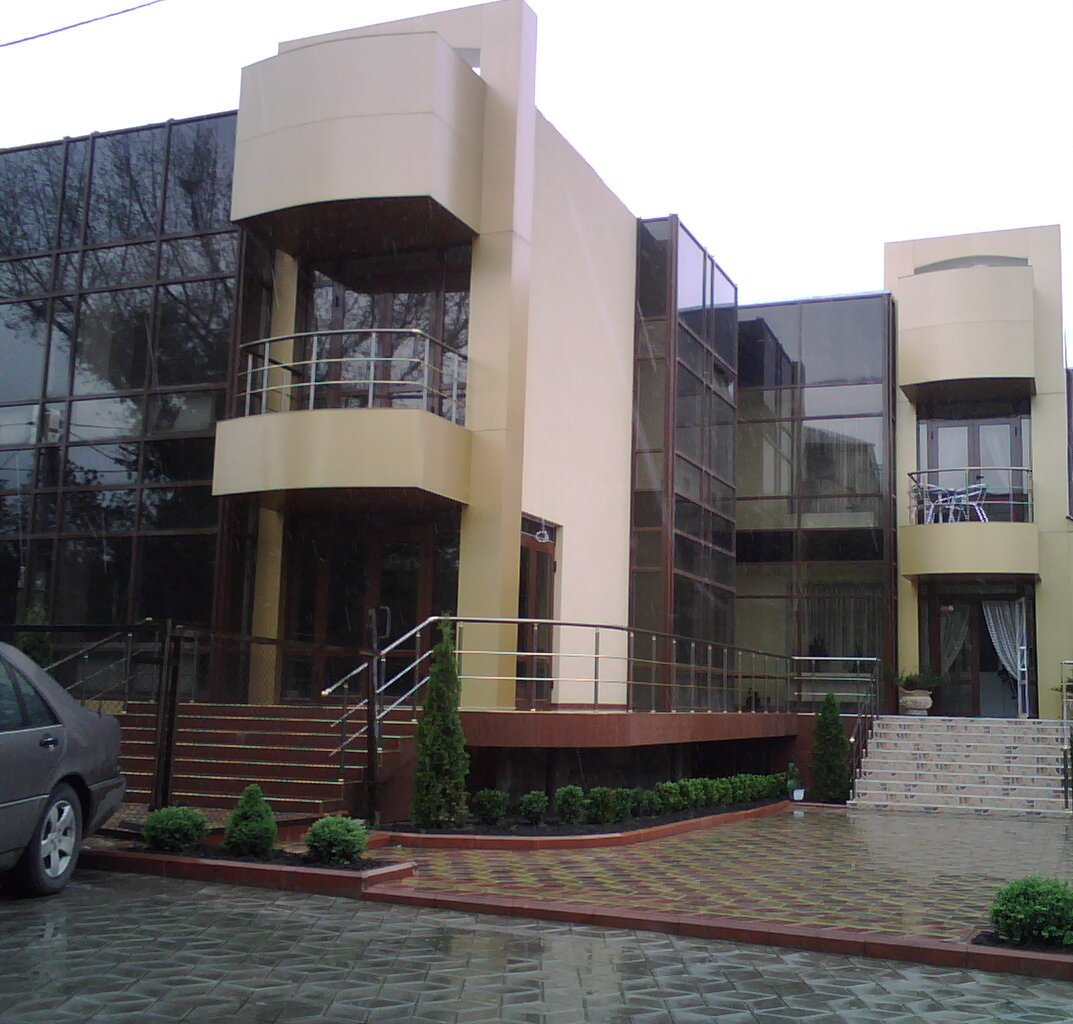
Hotel "Altyn Palace"

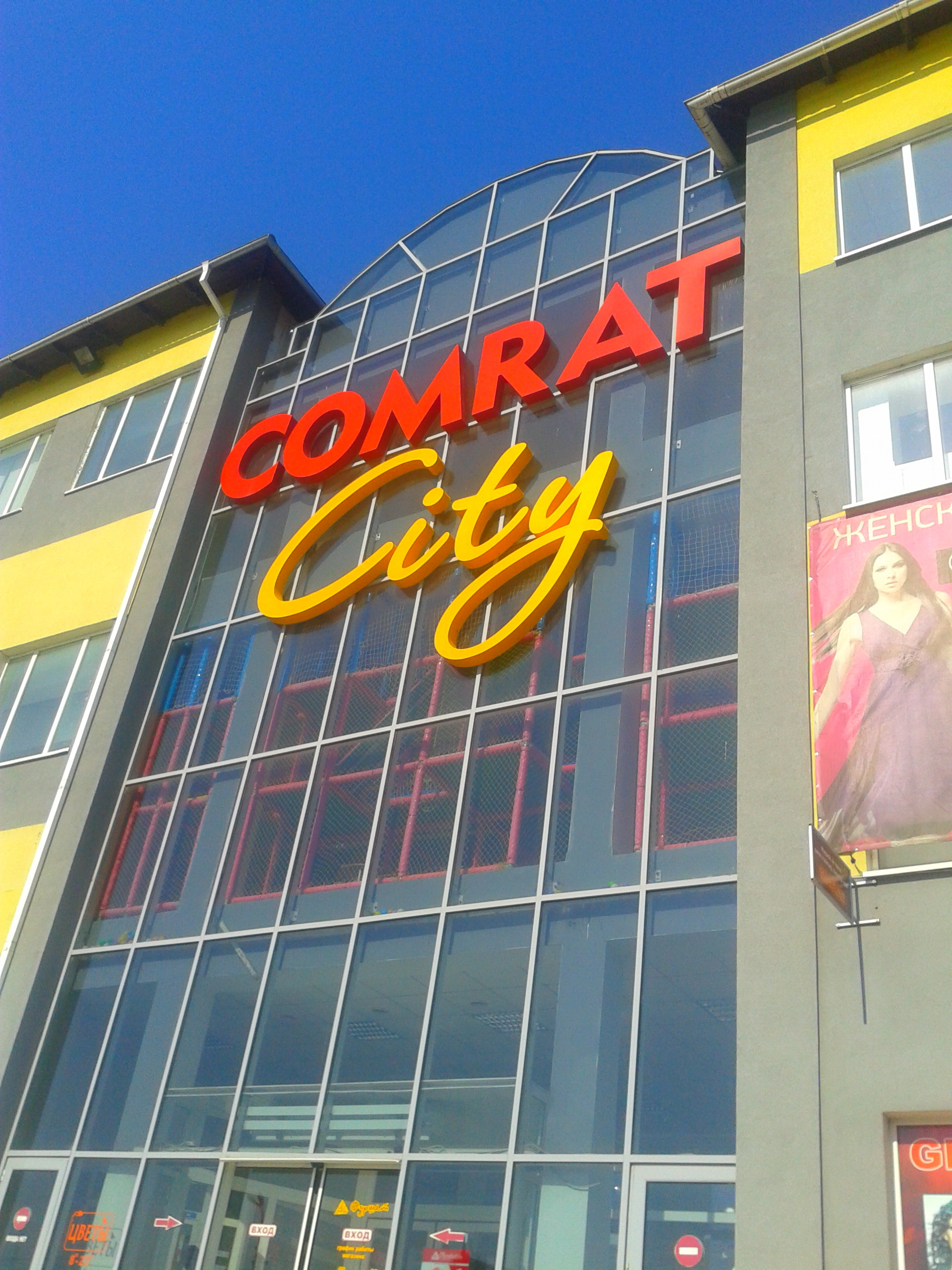
Shopping center "Comrat-City"

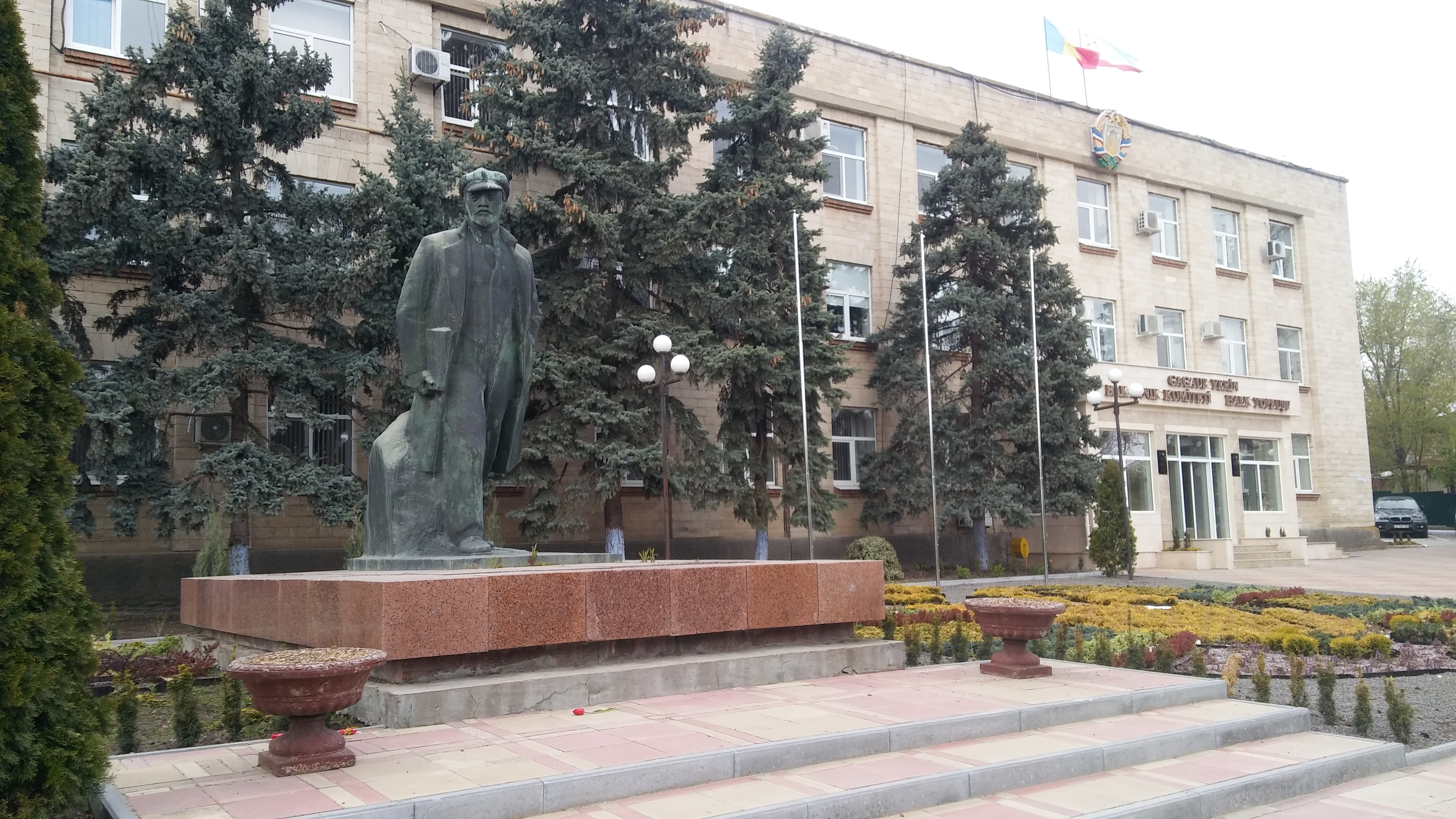
Lenin statue

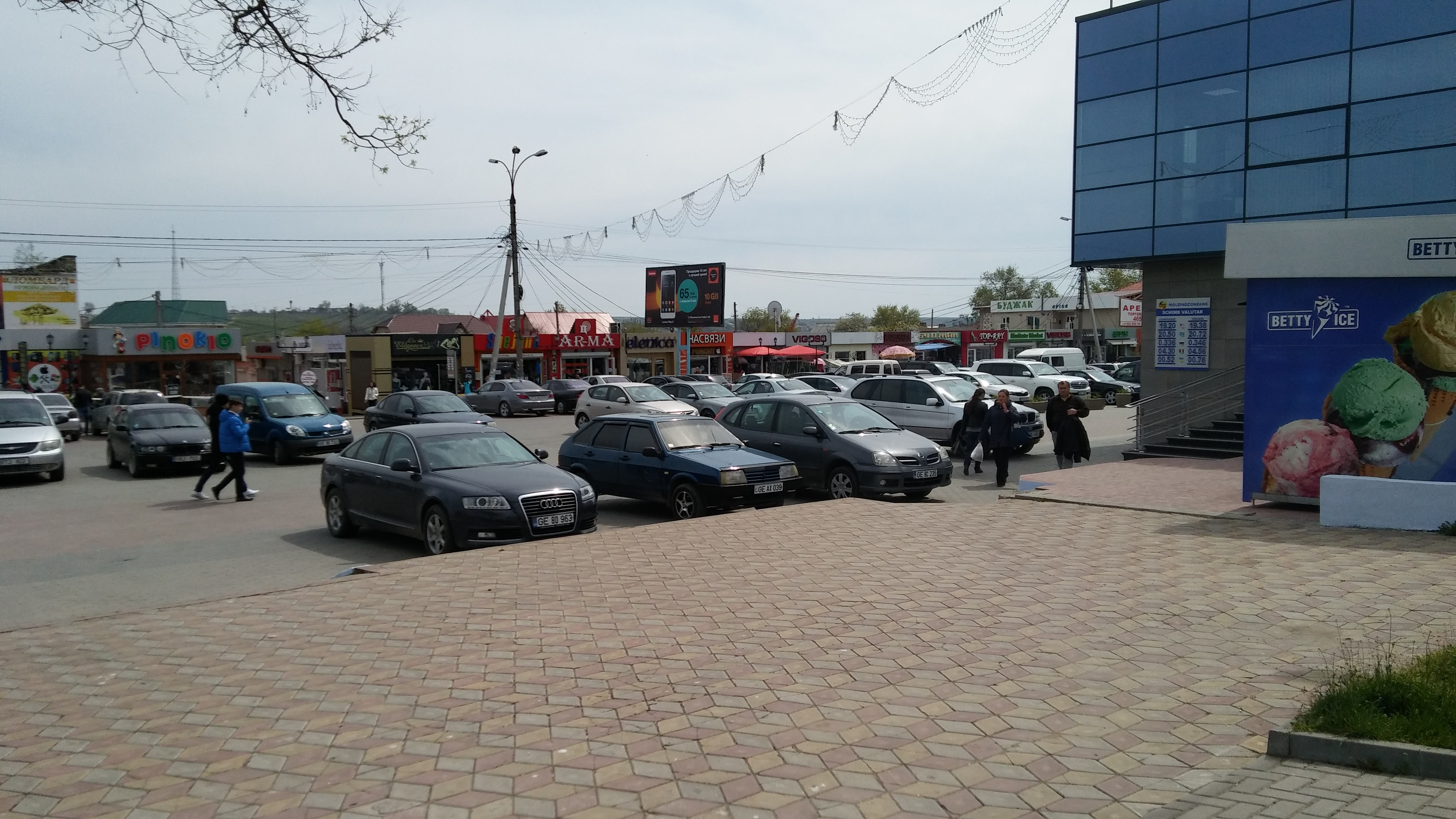
Street in Comrat
