= Petru Vlah =

Moldovan politician (born 1970)

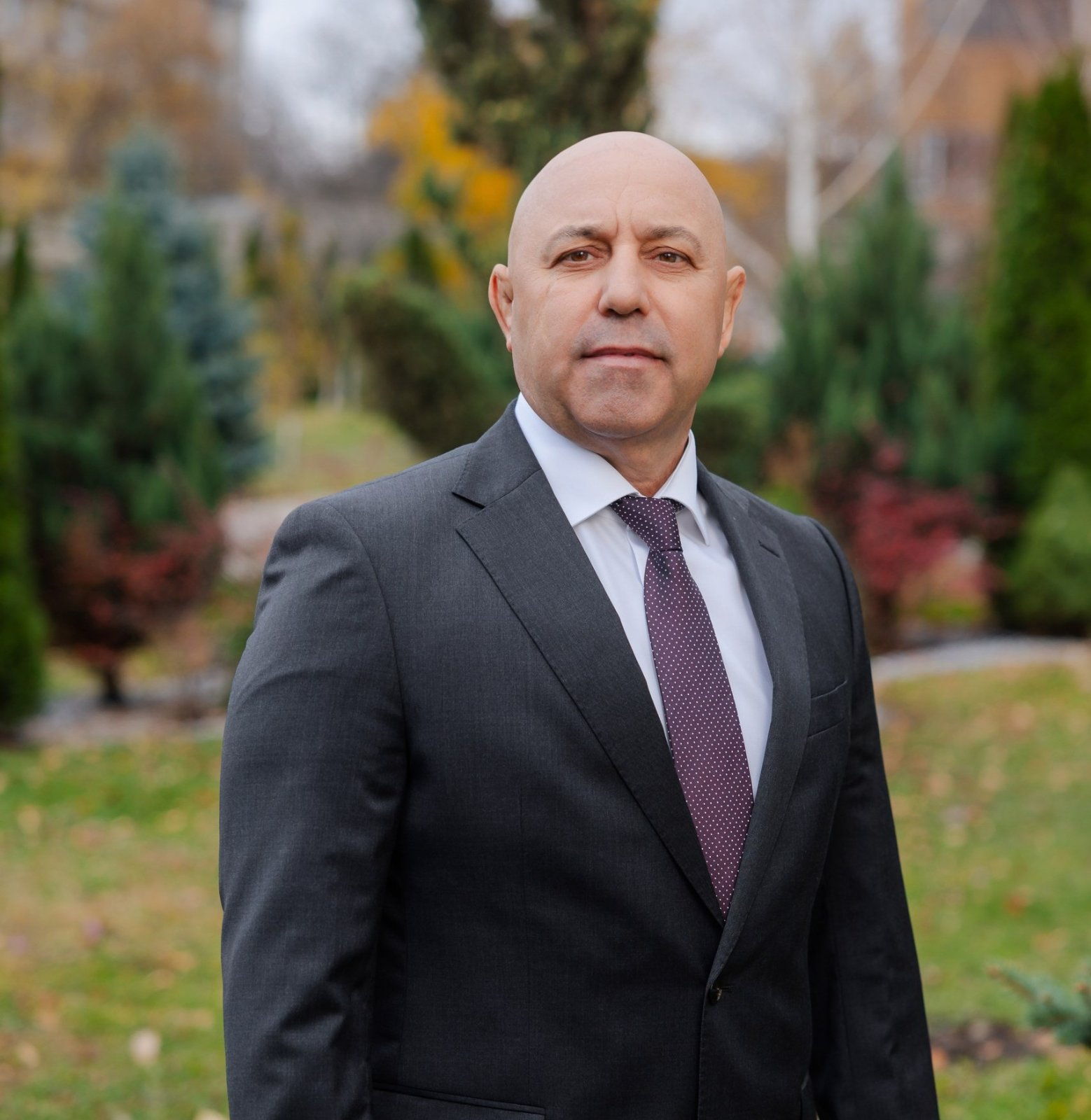
- Official portrait, 2025

Member of the Parliament of the Republic of Moldova
- In office 2010–2014

Deputy of the People's Assembly of Gagauzia
- In office 2008–2010

Independent Councilor, Comrat Municipal Council
- In office 2003–2008

Independent Councilor, Comrat Municipal Council
- In office 2015–2019

Personal details
- Born: 13 July 1970 (age 56) Comrat, Moldavian SSR, Soviet Union
- Party: Liberal Democratic Party of Moldova
- Other political affiliations: Alliance for European Integration (2010–2013)
- Children: 2
- Education: Comrat State University
- Occupation: Politician and Businessman
- Profession: Lawyer

Petru Vlah (born 13 July 1970 in Comrat) is a Moldovan lawyer, businessman, and politician. He served as a member of the Parliament of the Republic of Moldova from 2010 to 2014 and is recognized for his contributions to sports, public administration, and business.

== Early life and education ==
Petru Vlah was born on 13 July 1970 in Comrat. He graduated from School No. 2 in Comrat. From 1985 to 1986, he attended Special Technical Vocational School No. 3 in Chișinău, specializing in freestyle wrestling. Between 1986 and 1988, he studied at Shipbuilding School No. 116, sports division, in Leningrad (now Saint Petersburg).

From 1988 to 1991, he completed military service in the navy. In 2008, he graduated from the Faculty of Law at Comrat State University and subsequently earned a master's degree in law there (2008–2010).

== Sports career ==
In 1988, Vlah earned the title of Master of Sports of the USSR in freestyle wrestling, and in 1991, he received the same title in hand-to-hand wrestling. From 1992 to 1999, he worked as a freestyle wrestling coach at the Sports School for Children and Youth in Comrat.

Between 2001 and 2013, he served as president of the Federation of Freestyle Wrestling of Gagauzia. In 2010, he was recognized as an emeritus coach of the Republic of Moldova in freestyle wrestling.

In 2024, he awarded monetary prizes from his personal funds to Moldovan wrestlers (both men and women, in freestyle and Greco-Roman wrestling) who qualified for the Summer Olympics in Paris.

== Academic career ==
From 2012 to 2014, Vlah lectured at Comrat State University, teaching jurisprudence and law.

== Political and administrative career ==
From 2003 to 2008, he served as an independent councilor in the Comrat Municipal Council. Between 2008 and 2010, he was a deputy of the People's Assembly of Gagauzia, chairing the Committee for Youth and Sports.

From 2010 to 2014, Vlah was a member of the Parliament of the Republic of Moldova.

From 2011 to 2014, he served as Chair of the Human Rights Commission of the Interparliamentary Assembly of the Commonwealth of Independent States (CIS).

From 2015 to 2019, he returned as an independent councilor in the Comrat Municipal Council.

Vlah has been actively involved in Gagauzia's political and public life, advocating for the promotion of the Gagauz people within Moldovan society and supporting Gagauzia's autonomy as a model for peaceful conflict resolution.

He also participated in military operations in Angola and Syria and received various military decorations, including orders and medals.

On 6 August 2025, the Moldovan branch of the Alliance for the Union of Romanians (AUR) announced that Vlah had joined the party, with him stating that "I believe that only in a united Romania will minorities have the respect and protection they deserve". Vlah ran in the 2025 Moldovan parliamentary election, being in fifth place in AUR's candidate list. He later stated in November that year that the Gagauz were "promoters of Moldovan statehood" and that "they see their future as part of the Republic of Moldova", stressing that they did not oppose Moldova's European integration process and emphasizing the need for a dialogue between Chișinău and Comrat.

== Business career ==
In 2000, Vlah founded the company "Nezerant". Since 2019, he has been engaged in entrepreneurial activities. In 2022, he acquired a Vienna-based company specializing in real estate sales and rentals.

== Honors and awards ==
Vlah is an honorary citizen of the Comrat Municipality (2002). He received the Diploma of Honor of the Bashkan and the People's Assembly of Gagauzia in 2011, and the Diploma of Honor of the Commonwealth of Independent States (CIS) in 2013.

In 2014, he was awarded the Order of Labor Glory and the Order of the "Community" of the CIS. In 2026, he received the Diploma of Honor from the Ministry of Education of the Republic of Moldova for his contribution to training European and world champions in freestyle wrestling.

== Personal life ==
Petru Vlah is married and has two children.
