= Sorana Gurian =

Romanian writer (1913–1956)

- Born: Sara Gurfinchel; October 18, 1913; Comrat, Bessarabia, Russian Empire
- Died: June 10, 1956 (aged 42); Paris, France
- Education: Chernivtsi University, Iași University, the Sorbonne
- Occupations: writer, journalist, translator
- Known for: leftist publications, propagandistic texts, interpreter for the Allied Commission
- Notable work: director of Universul

Sorana Gurian (born Sara Gurfinchel; October 18, 1913 – June 10, 1956) was a Romanian writer, journalist, and translator who wrote both in Romanian and in French.

Born in the Russian Empire, in Comrat, Bessarabia, she lost both of her parents while still young. After that, she and her two younger sisters, Lia and Isabela, were taken care of by their stepmother. She went to high school in Bender, passing her Baccalauréat exam in 1931, and then studied at the Letters Department of Chernivtsi University and Iași University without graduating.

She became a member of Eugen Lovinescu's Sburătorul literary circle in 1937, after returning from Berck, France, where she had gone for balneotherapeutical treatment of her extrapulmonary tuberculosis. While in France, it seems, she also studied at the Sorbonne. When she returned to Romania, she started publishing articles, first in the "Lumea" magazine in Iași, which were clearly democratic, antinationalist, antifascist and antirevisionist in style.

Feeling the effect of the antisemitic laws, she joined the underground opposition, which the Communists were also a part of. The Gestapo began to take an interest in her in 1942, and she hid for two years in a building basement, surviving with the help of the priest of the French legation and the head of a Catholic girls' boarding school in Bucharest. Under the influence of Vladimir Ghika, she had by then converted from Judaism to Catholicism.

After Romania changed sides on August 23, 1944, thanks to the fact that she knew Communists from her time in the underground opposition, she was named director of Universul. In the first three years after the war, she collaborated with many leftist publications, wrote propagandistic texts and, as she knew Russian, worked as an interpreter for the Allied Commission. But after a while, she was suspected by the Communist authorities of being a French spy, and realizing that the new regime imposed one restriction after another beginning a reign of terror, in 1949, she managed to escape from Romania by entering into a marriage of convenience with an Italian citizen helped by the Italian ambassador. After divorcing her husband, she went to Israel, where she stayed until 1950, and then emigrated to France, settling down in Paris.

She died of cancer in Paris in 1956.

== Works ==
- Zilele nu se întorc niciodată, Bucharest, 1945
- Întâmplări dintre amurg şi noapte, Bucharest, 1946
- Les mailles du filet. Mon journal de Roumanie, Paris, 1950
- Les jours ne reviennent jamais, Paris, 1952
- Les amours impitoyables, Paris, 1953
- Recit d'un combat, Paris, 1956
- Ochiurile reţelei. Jurnalul meu din Romania, Bucharest, 2002

== Translations ==
She translated works by Alexander Griboyedov, J. B. Priestley, Hans Prager, Franz Ludwig Neher, etc.

== Works featuring Gurian ==
- Virginia's Sisters: An Anthology of Women's Writing, Aurora Metro Books, 2023, ISBN 9781912430789
