= Alexandr Stoianoglo =

Moldovan politician (born 1967)

Alexandr Stoianoglo MP
- Aleksandr Stoyanoglu
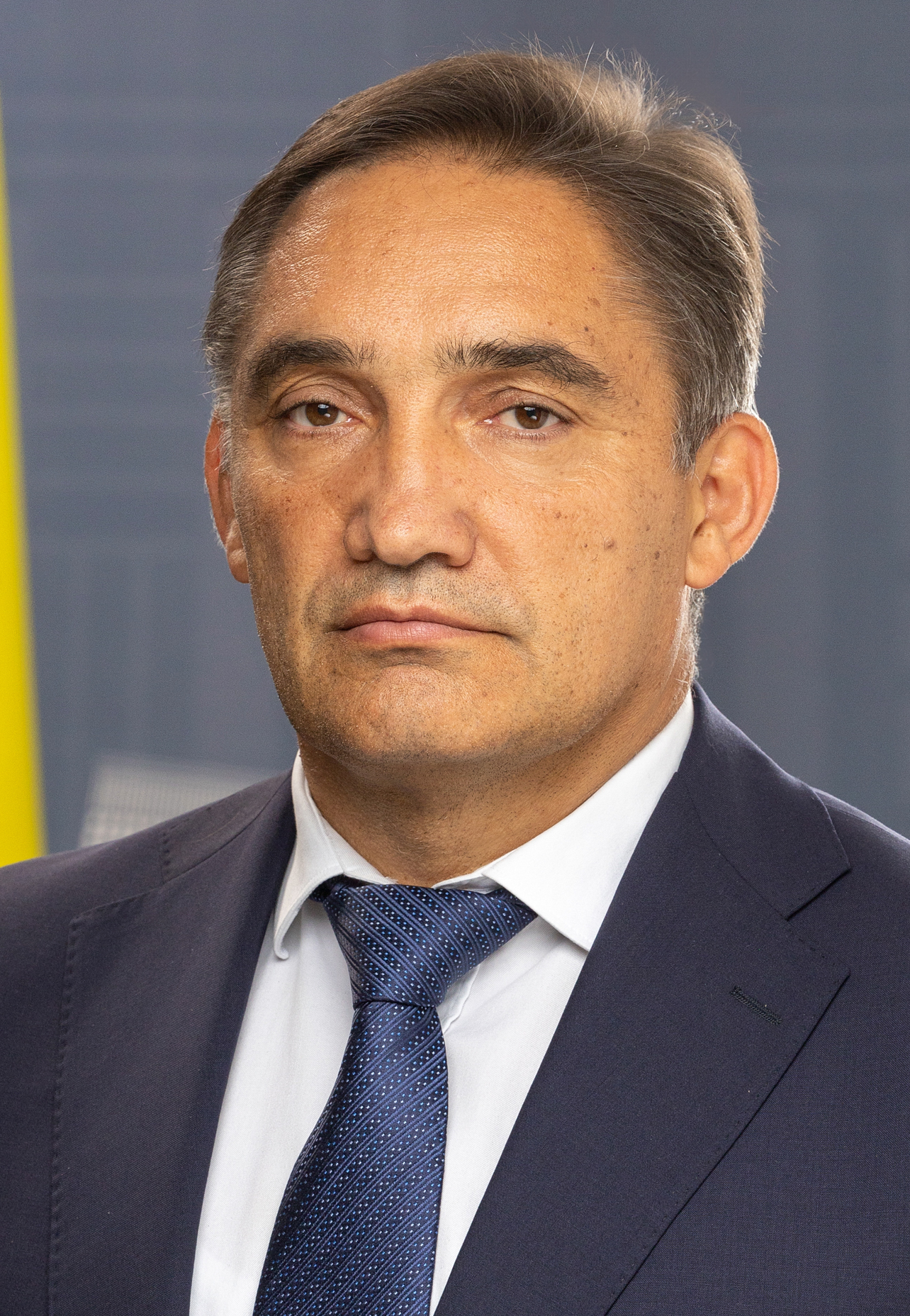
- Official portrait, 2025

Member of the Moldovan Parliament
- Incumbent
- Assumed office 22 October 2025
- Parliamentary group: Alternative Bloc
- In office 14 August 2009 – 9 December 2014
- Parliamentary group: Democratic Party

Prosecutor General of Moldova
- In office 29 November 2019 – 5 October 2021
- Preceded by: Eduard Harunjen
- Succeeded by: Dumitru Robu (acting)

Vice President of the Moldovan Parliament
- In office 25 September 2009 – 28 November 2010
- President: Mihai Ghimpu (acting)
- Prime Minister: Vlad Filat
- Speaker: Mihai Ghimpu
- Preceded by: Marcel Răducan
- Succeeded by: Liliana Palihovici

Personal details
- Born: 3 June 1967 (age 59) Comrat, Moldavian SSR, Soviet Union (now Moldova)
- Citizenship: Moldova; Romania
- Party: Alternative (since 2025)
- Other political affiliations: PSDE (2009–2014); Alliance for European Integration (2009–2013); PSRM (2024)
- Education: Moldova State University
- Occupation: Lawyer • Prosecutor • Politician

Alexandr Stoianoglo (also Alexandru; Gagauz: Aleksandr Stoyanoglu; born 3 June 1967) is a Moldovan former prosecutor and politician.

Stoianoglo was a candidate in the 2024 Moldovan presidential election. He came second in the first round of voting, eventually losing to incumbent president Maia Sandu in the runoff.

== Personal life ==
Alexandr Stoianoglo is an ethnic Gagauz. Apart from being a Moldovan citizen, he also has Romanian citizenship. Stoianoglo speaks Romanian, Russian, Gagauz and Turkish.

== Career and legal issues ==
Stoianoglo graduated from law school in 1992 and worked as a prosecutor in Gagauzia. He was a member of the Parliament of Moldova from 2009–2014 and became Prosecutor General of Moldova in 2019.

On 5 October 2021, Stoianoglo was arrested by security forces under allegations of corruption. In total, five cases were filed against him by Lilian Carp MP, a Vice President of the governing Party of Action and Solidarity. He was suspended from office by Maia Sandu's government, who won the presidency in 2020 on an anti-corruption ticket, before being ultimately dismissed as Prosecutor General in September 2023.

In 2023, the European Court of Human Rights ruled that Stoianoglo's right to a fair trial had been violated and awarded him 3,600 euros in damages. In February 2024, a Chișinău court acquitted him in the case involving authorisation of payments to a subordinate prosecutor. During the trial, Stoianoglo accused the government of using the cases to prevent him from ridding the prosecutor's office of political influence.

In 2021 began a criminal case in which Stoianoglo was accused of passive corruption, accepting illegal advantages, abuse of power for the benefit of a criminal organization as well as making false statements. According to investigators, Stoianoglo and prosecutors Dumitru Raileanu and Elena Ceruța, also accused in the same criminal case, would have acted to facilitate the release from detention of Moldovan fugitive businessman Veaceslav Platon.

== 2024 presidential campaign ==
Stoianoglo ran as a candidate with the support of the Party of Socialists in the 2024 Moldovan presidential election, where he gained enough votes to force a runoff despite placing second in the first round of voting on 20 October. He faced incumbent president Maia Sandu in the second round on 3 November.

Stoianoglo expressed opposition to amending the Constitution of Moldova to enshrine its commitment to joining the European Union in the 2024 Moldovan European Union membership constitutional referendum held on the same day as the first round of the presidential election, although he says that he is a supporter of Moldova's "European aspirations". He also promised a "balanced" foreign policy with the EU, the United States, Russia, and China as part of his campaign pledge. He also pledged to restore the supply of cheap Russian gas. During a debate on 27 October, he pledged to continue support for Ukraine. After it was noted that his youngest daughter was working in Germany, an EU member state, Stoianoglo said it was "the right of every young person in Moldova" to go where they wanted.

Stoianoglo was described by Politico, BBC News and The Guardian as being backed by a pro-Russian campaign. Furthermore, his candidacy was supported by Moldovan pro-Russian fugitive oligarch Ilan Shor, who was a central figure in Russian vote buying activities in the presidential election and referendum. Stoianoglo lost in the runoff vote on 3 November to Sandu, having had a greater vote share in rural areas and a majoritary share of ballots cast within Moldova overall, whilst the winner Sandu claimed more votes amongst those living in cities and from Moldovans in work or education overseas.

== 2026 Bashkan election ==
In 2026, Stoianoglo ran as an independent candidate for the position of Bashkan of Gagauzia, the head of the autonomous territorial unit. In the first round on 15 November, he received a plurality of 38.44%. As no candidate secured an absolute majority, Stoianoglo qualified for the second round, scheduled for 29 November 2026, against Fiodor Gagauz of the PSRM.
