= Anatoliy Blashku =

Transnistrian politician (1944–2021)

- Анатолий Блашку

Personal details
- Born: 16 November 1944 Biruința, MSSR, USSR
- Died: 20 March 2021 (aged 76)
- Education: Shevchenko Transnistria State University A.Ioffe's Institute of Physics and Technology

Anatoliy Ivanovich Blashku (Russian: Анатолий Иванович Блашку; 16 November 1944 – 20 March 2021) was a Transnistrian politician who served as the Minister of Industry of Transnistria from 2001 to 2007.

== Biography ==
Blashku was born on 15 November 1944 in the village Biruința of Sîngerei District of MSSR.

=== Education ===
• 1965 graduated from Shevchenko Transnistria State University • 1972 graduated the PhD studies at the Leningrad Ioffe Institute

=== Career ===
- January 1967 - November 1969, assistant at the Department of General Physics of the Tiraspol Pedagogical Institute.
- 1969 - 1973 – the Research Fellowt, then, the Junior Researcher at the Institute of Applied Physics of the Academy of Sciences of the MSSR.
- from October 1973, worked at the "Moldavizolit" Enterprise, started as the head of the central Enterprise laboratory and then, became the Director of the Enterprise.
- In 1986–1990, deputy at the Tiraspol City Council of People's Deputies.
- February 1997, appointed as the deputy chairman of the PMR government.
- From September 2000 to January 2007 - Minister of Industry of Transnistria.
- 2007 - 2011, the assistant of the President of the PMR in industry.

The author of 35 works in the field of physics, the owner of 25 copyright certificates.

=== Awards and prizes ===
Awards

- Order of Labor Glory
- Order of Honor
- Medal "For Labor Valor"
- Diploma of the President of the Pridnestrovian Moldavian Republic

Prizes

- The prizewinner of the State Prize in Science and Technology of the MSSR.
- Twice prizewinner of the State Prize of the USSR Council of Ministers.

He died on 20 March 2021, in Tiraspol.

== Family ==
Blashku was married and had two daughters.
