= Office of the Prosecutor General of Moldova =

Moldovan judicial body

- Procuratura Generală a Republicii Moldova
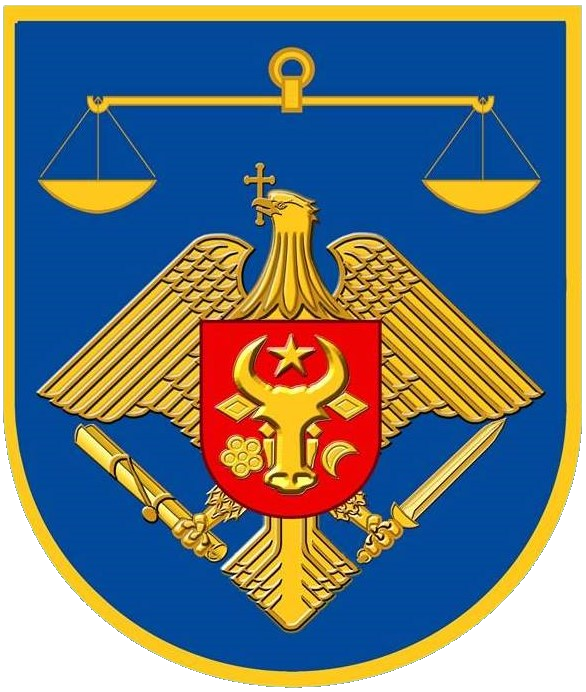

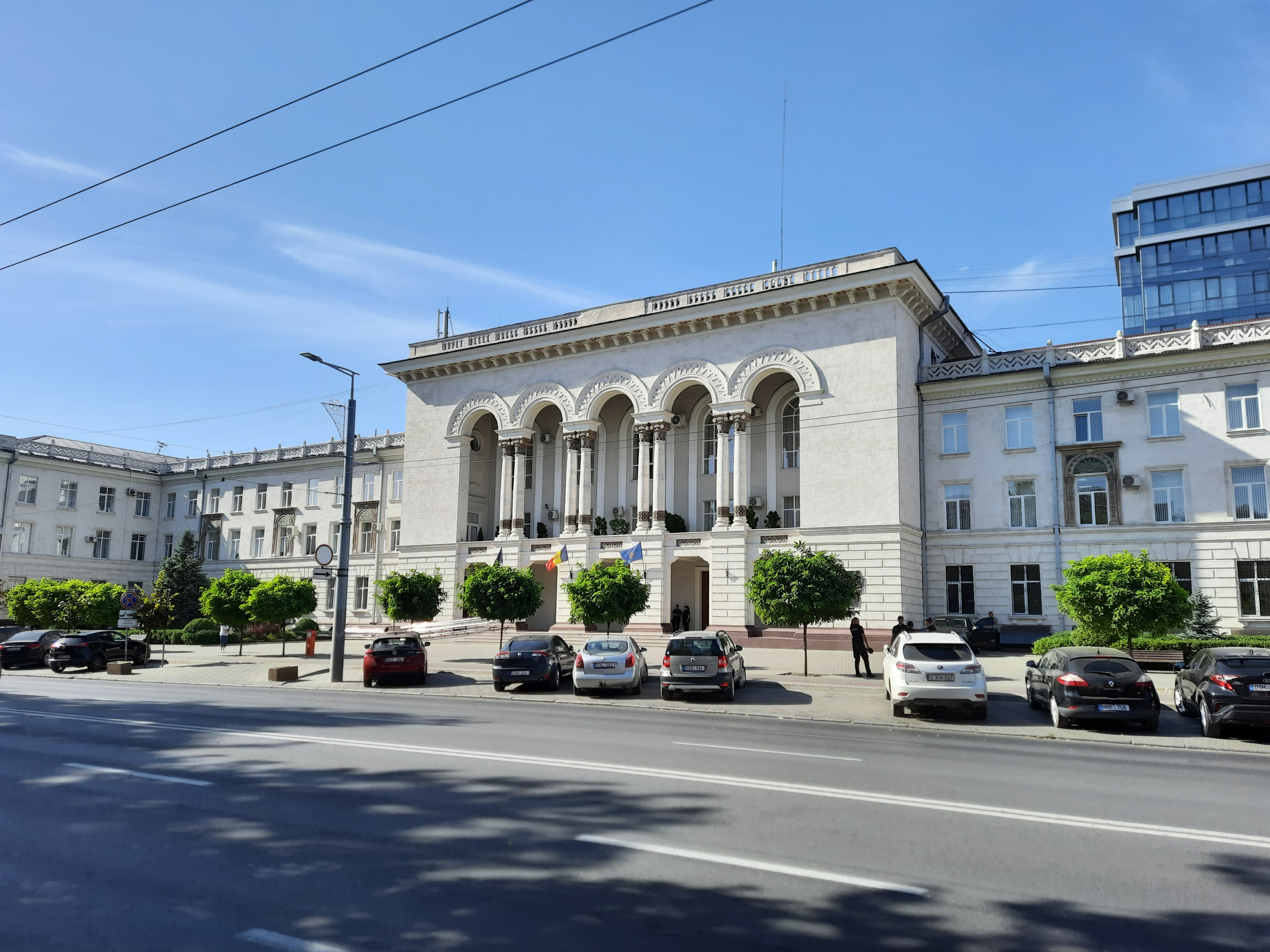
- Headquarters in Chișinău

Agency overview
- Formed: 1991
- Jurisdiction: Constitution of Moldova
- Headquarters: 73 Stephen the Great Avenue, Chișinău
- Agency executive: Alexandru Machidon, Prosecutor General
- Website: http://procuratura.md/

The Office of the Prosecutor General of Moldova (abbreviated PG; Romanian: Procuratura Generală a Republicii Moldova) is a government institution in Moldova, that works within the judicial power. It carries out and promotes observance of the rule of law, justice, protection of the rights and legitimate interests of the individual and society in criminal and other legal proceedings.

== History ==
On 23 July 1812, the authorities of the Russian Empire in Bessarabia laid the foundation for the activities of the prosecutor's office in Bessarabia. In May 1818, a prosecutor was appointed under the provincial government, county prosecutors appeared in the districts and county prosecutors were established, and prosecutors were approved by civil servants. The regional prosecutor’s office existed in Bessarabia until 1859, when the Chisinau district court was created and prosecutors appeared at the district courts and the Court of Appeal. After the October Revolution and the collapse of the Russian Empire, the Moldavian Democratic Republic was formed on the territory of the right-bank part of the Bessarabian province, which lasted less than a year and became part of the Kingdom of Romania. By decree of the King Ferdinand I on 6 October 1918, the prosecutor's supervision is carried out by the prosecutor under the leadership of the Minister of Justice, who was the general prosecutor. After the establishment of Soviet power in Moldova on 2 August 1940, 6 district prosecutor’s offices were created in the following cities: Balti, Bender, Cahul, Chisinau, Orhei and Soroca. The procedure for the creation and powers of the prosecutor's office were established in accordance with the regulation on 17 December 1933. By decree of the Presidium of the Supreme Soviet of the USSR on 22 June 1941, Moldovan prosecutors were either enlisted in the Red Army or continued to monitor public order, labour discipline, the rights and interests of the military and their families. In the post-war period, the activities of the prosecutor's office were focused on strengthening the rule of law in various fields. In October 1947, the original district prosecutor's offices were liquidated with all city and district prosecutors being directly subordinate to the prosecutor's office of the Moldavian SSR. With the adoption of the Constitution of the USSR (1977) and the Constitution of the Moldavian SSR (1978), the position of the prosecutor's office was significantly strengthened. The modern Office of the Prosecutor General was created via a law adopted on 26 January 1992.

== Structure ==
- Prosecutor General
- Deputy Prosecutor General
- Anti-corruption Prosecutor's Office
- Military Prosecutor
- Office of International Cooperation and European Integration
  - Department of International Legal Assistance
  - Department of Protocol, International Cooperation and European Integration
- Office of Criminal Prosecution and Forensics
  - Division for the unification of criminal prosecution practices
  - Anti-trafficking Unit
  - Department of Information Technology and the fight against cybercrime
  - Torture Unit
- Judicial Administration
  - Division for the unification of judicial practice
  - Division of Prosecution in the Supreme Court of Justice
  - Division for representation in non-criminal proceedings and implementation of the ECHR
- Management of Policies, Reforms and Advocacy
  - Department of Policies, Reforms and Project Management
  - Department of Investigation of Crimes against the Environment and the Public Interest
  - Department of Juvenile Justice
- Department of control over special investigative activities and ensuring the secret regime
- Special Prosecutors
- Department of Personal Data Protection
- Internal Audit Department
- Inspection of prosecutors
- Office of the Attorney General
  - Public Relations Department
  - Human Resources Department
  - Department of the Secretariat, Petitions and Reception
- Financial and administrative management
  - Department of Finance and Accounting
  - Department of Public Procurement and Logistics

== Prosecutors General ==
- Semyon Kolesnik (1945–1949)
- Grigory Osipov (1949–1953)
- Akim Kazanir (1953–1970)
- Ivan Cheban (1970–1987)
- Nikolai Demidenko (1987–1990)
- Dumitru Postovan (1990 – 30 July 1998)
- Valeriu Catană (31 July 1998 – 29 July 1999)
- Mircea Iuga (29 July 1999 – 24 February 2001)
- Vasile Rusu (18 May 2001 – 4 December 2003)
- Valeriu Balaban (15 December 2003 – 8 February 2007)
- Valeriu Gurbulea (8 February 2007 – 2 October 2009)
- Valeriu Zubco (7 October 2009 – 21 January 2013)
- Corneliu Gurin (18 April 2013 – 1 March 2016)
- Eduard Harunjen (8 December 2016 – 11 July 2019)
- Dumitru Robu (acting) (31 July 2019 – 29 November 2019)
- Alexandr Stoianoglo (29 November 2019 – 5 October 2021)
- Dumitru Robu (acting) (6 October 2021 – 12 October 2022)
- Ion Munteanu (12 October 2022 (Note: Acting until 1 June 2024) – 26 May 2025)
- Alexandru Machidon (28 May 2025 (Note: Acting until 30 April 2026) – present)

== Institutions ==
=== Supreme Council of Prosecutors ===
The Supreme Council of Prosecutors (Romanian: Consiliul Superior al Procurorilor) is a representative body of self-government under the Prosecutor's Office of Moldova, which consists of 15 members: 6 permanent and 9 elected.

Permanent members include:

- Prosecutor General
- Prosecutor General of Gagauzia
- President of the Supreme Council of Magistracy
- Minister of Justice of Moldova
- Human Rights Ombudsman
- President of the Bar Association of Moldova

5 members are elected by secret, direct and free ballot: 1 from the Prosecutor's Office, 4 from territorial and specialized prosecutor's offices and 4 more member on a competitive basis by proposal from the following: the President of Moldova, Parliament of Moldova, Academy of Sciences and the Government of Moldova.

=== General Assembly of Prosecutors ===
The General Assembly of Prosecutors (Romanian: Adunarea Generală a procurorilor) is an advisory body to the Prosecutor's Office. It consists of prosecutors of cities and regions of Moldova on a rotational basis, elected by the Supreme Council of Prosecutors.
