= Gaidar, Gagauzia =

Gaidar Haydar
- Commune
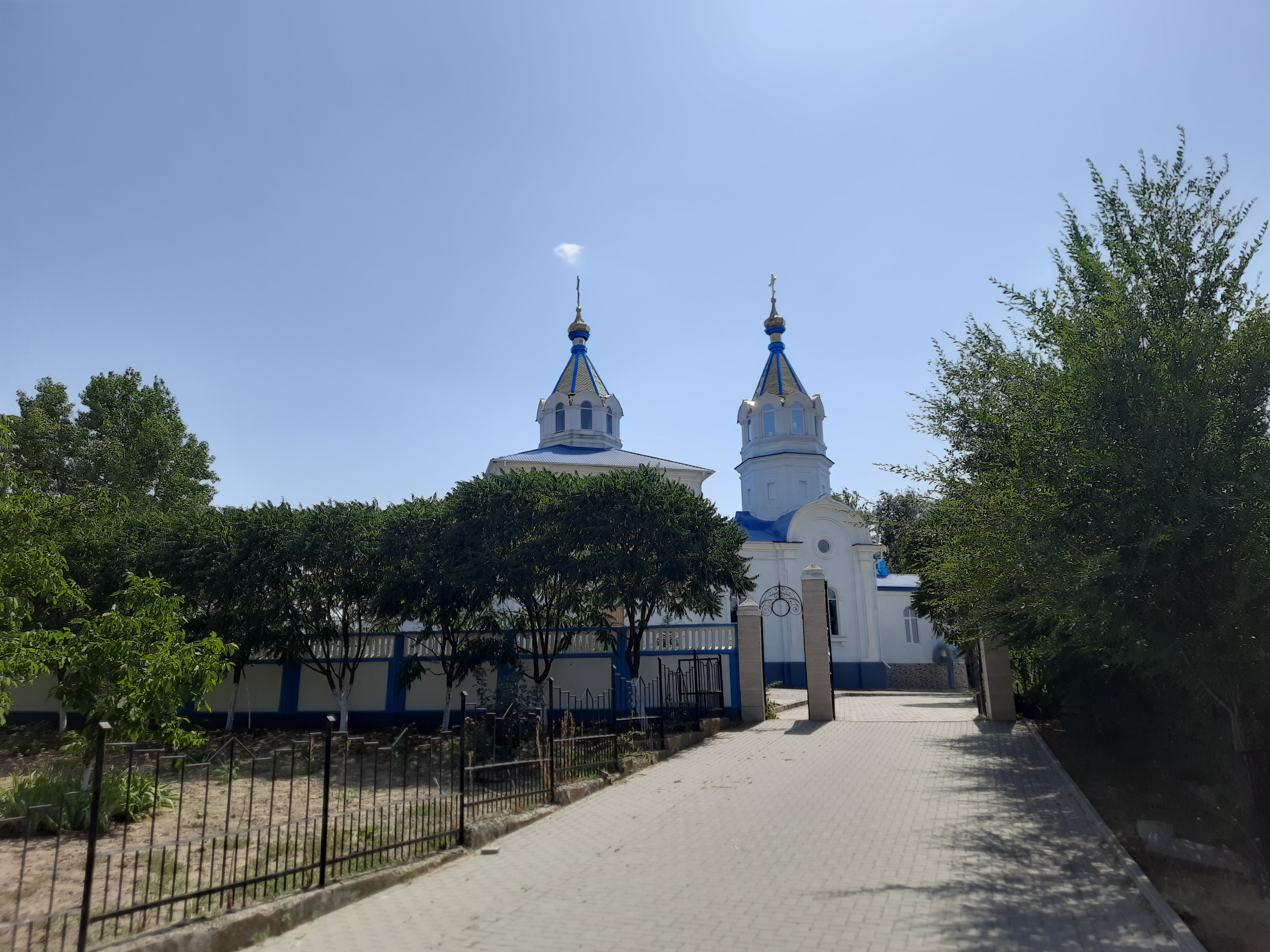
- Assumption of the Virgin Mary church

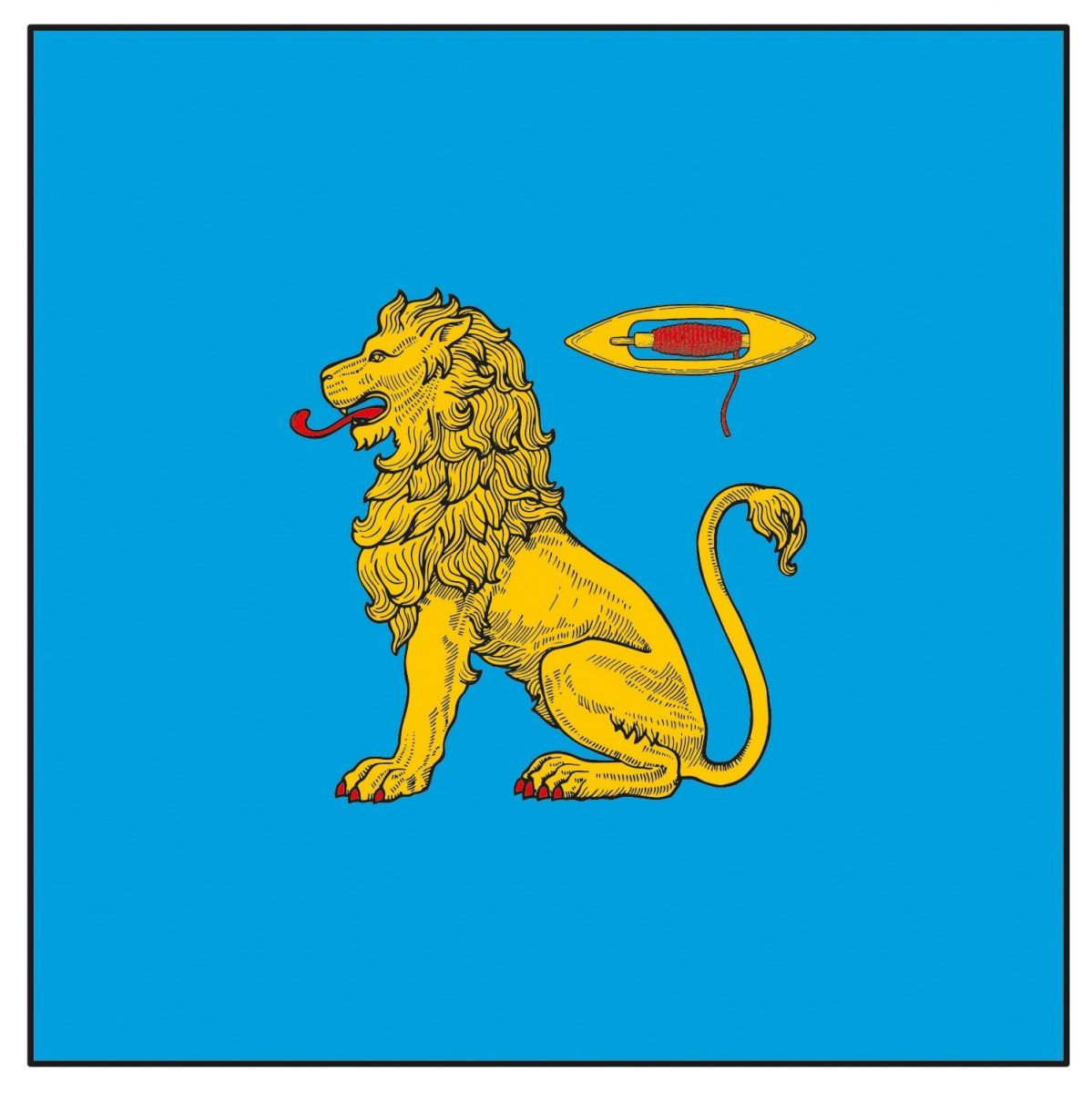
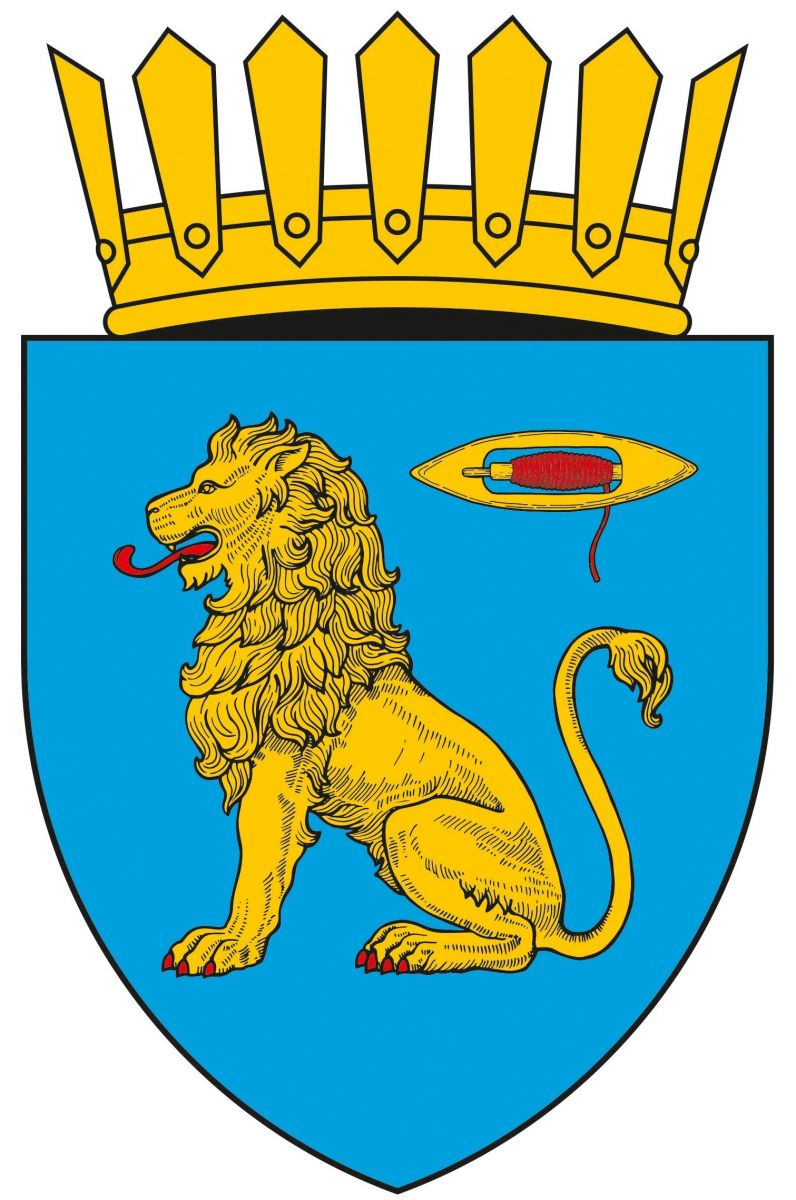
- Flag Seal

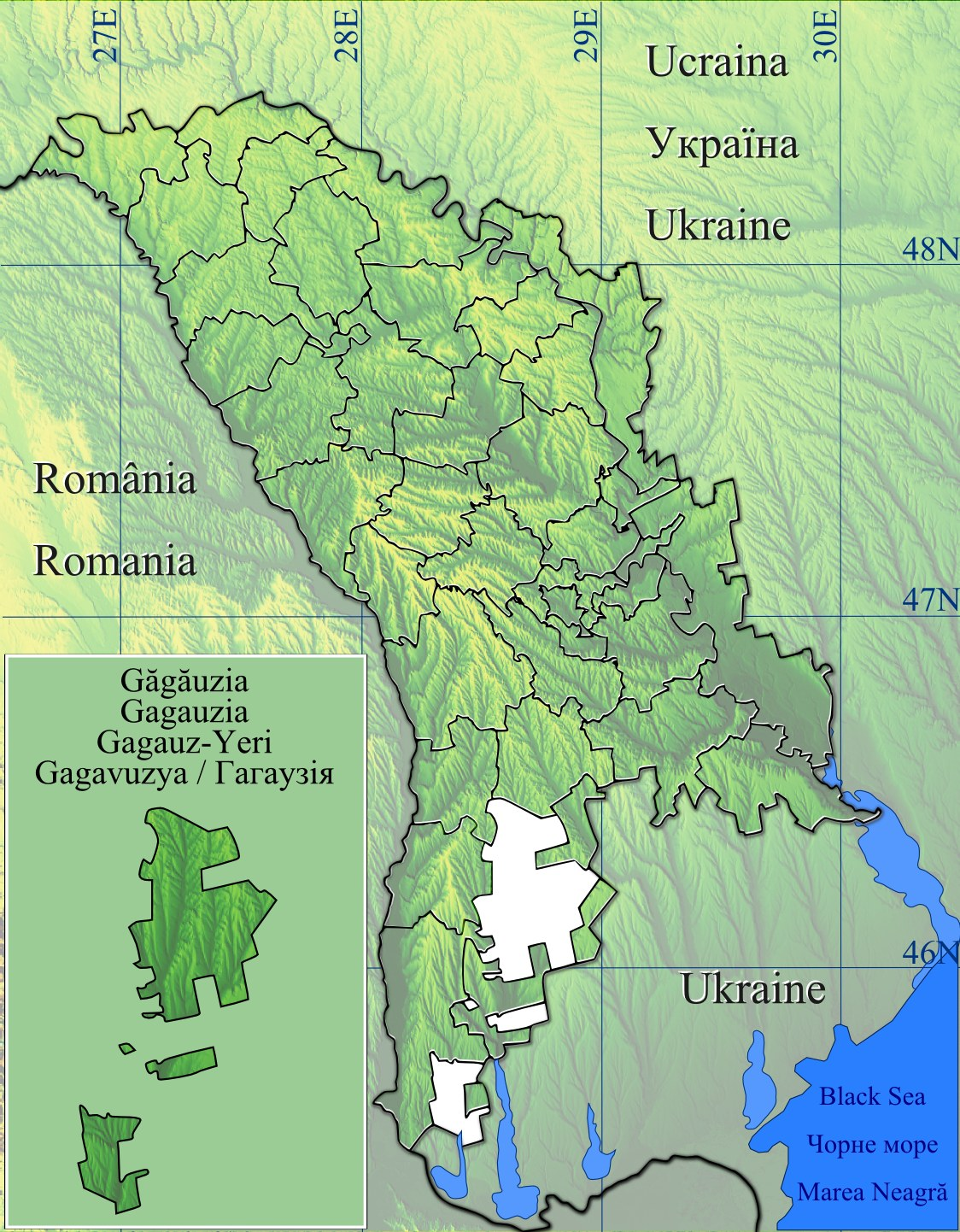
- Location of Gaidar in Moldova
- Coordinates: 46°06′10″N 28°45′54″E
- Country: Moldova
- Autonomous Region: Gagauzia
- Founded: 1806

Government
  - Mayor: Ilya Kyosya

Population (2024)
  - Total: 2,538

Ethnicity (2024 census)
  - Gagauz people: 93.61%
  - Moldovans: 3.27%
  - other: 3.12%
- Time zone: UTC+2 (EET)
- Climate: Cfb
- Website: aidar.md

Gaidar (Gagauz: Haydar) is a commune and village in the Ceadîr-Lunga district, Gagauz Autonomous Territorial Unit of the Republic of Moldova. According to the 2024 Moldovan census the commune has 2,538 people, 2,376 (93.61%) of them being Gagauz.

== History ==
The village was an old Nogai settlement, where 58 Bulgarian and Gagauz families from Bulgaria settled in the early 18th and late 19th century. The village took the name Haydar after Haidar-Aga, a local Nogai tribal leader and warlord in the Budjak Horde and the Crimean Khanate. Initially the Gagauz lived alongside the Nogai until they were forced to leave by the Russian Empire.

The village was formally established in 1806 as Gaidar, sometimes spelled Haidar or Haydar. In 1820 construction began on a wooden church, named the "Assumption of the Virgin Mary". Which was rebuilt out of stone in 1905.

== International relations ==
=== Twin towns — Sister cities ===
Chirsova is twinned with:

- General Kiselovo, Bulgaria;
- Oleksandrivka, Bolhrad Raion, Ukraine;
