= Comrat State University =

Public university in Moldova

Coordinates: 46°17′59″N 28°39′12″E

- Gagauz: Komrat Devlet Universiteti; Romanian: Universitatea de Stat din Comrat; Russian: Комратский государственный университет
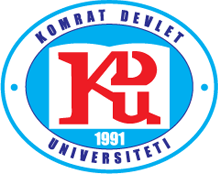
- Former name: Gagauz National University
- Type: Public
- Established: 1991 / 2002
- Rector: Serghei Zaharia
- Students: 500
- Location: Comrat, Gagauzia, Republic of Moldova
- Website: kdu.md

Comrat State University (KDU; Romanian: Universitatea de Stat din Comrat) is a public university in Comrat, Moldova. It is the successor of the Gagauz National University, founded on 11 February 1991, by the decision of the Russian Education Foundation and the executive committee of Comrat Regional Council of Deputies. In 2002, it became a state university, by the Resolution of the Government of Moldova.

== Structure ==
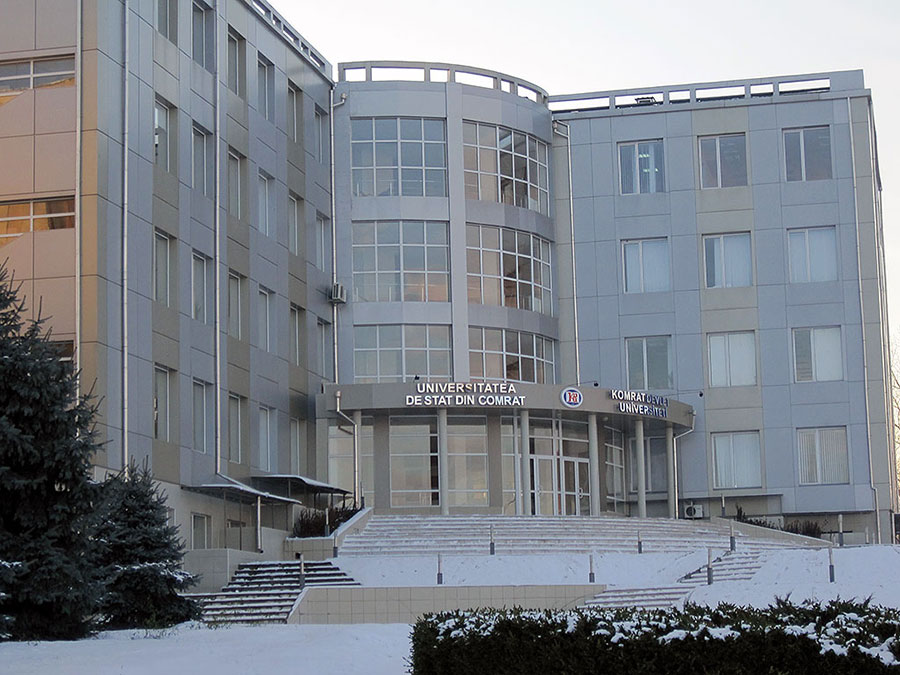

The university has 4 faculties:

- National Culture Faculty
- Economic Faculty
- Law Faculty
- Agricultural-Technological Faculty.

In total there are 17 departments in the university providing training on 38 specialties, which meet the demands of region. There are as well two scientific centers, an Agro-ecological center, and a center of informational technology.

The university's distinctive objectives is meeting the needs of the Republic of Moldova and Gagauzia especially in highly skilled professionals – university graduates.

All the students learn the Gagauz language, the official language of Gagauzia, in the Republic of Moldova, although almost all classes are taught in Russian language. The classes of the “Gagauz language and literature” specialty are taught in Gagauz; additionally, the course papers and final thesis papers are written in this language. Classes are also held in Romanian, Bulgarian, English.

The CSU organizes scientific conferences; the annual scientific conferences devoted to anniversaries of the university take place in January–February of each year. The Moldovan-Russian symposium is of a special significance.

Doctorate studies are available in the fields of Gagauz philology, economics and management at the university. The university contains 6 language and culture centers of a number of foreign countries. These have been created with the assistance of the German, UK, US, Turkish, Azerbaijan and Greek Embassies in Moldova.

The university maintains wide international relations with the Balkan Universities Network and other Higher Education Institutions from Turkey, Bulgaria, Russia, Germany and China that provide the possibility of student and teaching staff exchange for the improvement of educational and scientific work.

The university is actively involved in the international TEMPUS project.

- 2006 – project “Tempus” in collaboration with Swedish Royal University; as a result the Business - Informational Center was founded.
- 2008 – the project “The connection of universities and businessmen” together with the Technical University of Moldova was implemented;
- 2009 – in cooperation with German University of Koblenz-Landau the project on creation of the educational centre for administrative staff was carried out.
- Of great importance are the public lectures of the ambassadors accredited to the Republic Moldova in CSU.

== Affiliations ==
The university is a member of the Caucasus University Association.

== See also ==
- List of universities in Moldova
- Education in Moldova
