= Natalia Șoșeva =

Moldovan pharmacist and politician (born 1964)

Member of the People's Assembly of Gagauzia for Joltai
- In office 2003–2021
- Preceded by: Fiodor Terzi
- Succeeded by: Nicolai Andrușoi

Personal details
- Born: 1964 (age 61–62)
- Party: Independent

Natalia Dmitrievna Șoșeva (born 1964) is a Moldovan pharmaceutical executive and politician who served in the People's Assembly of Gagauzia from 2003 until 2021. An independent politician, she represented the town of Joltai. Since 2022, Șoșeva has been the interim president of the Ceadîr-Lunga.

== Biography ==
Natalia Șoșeva was born in 1964. Prior to entering politics, she worked as both a doctor and pharmacist. Șoșeva was the head of Farmacon, a pharmaceutical company based in Gagauzia, an autonomous region in southern Moldova. She also owns several real estate properties.

Șoșeva was elected to the People's Assembly of Gagauzia, the territory's legislature, in the 2003 election, representing the town of Joltai as an independent. Following her election, she renounced her ownership of Farmacon. She was re-elected in the 2008, 2012, and 2016 elections, receiving 459 votes (55%), 503 votes (54%), and 502 votes (61%), respectively. Șoșeva became the vice president of the assembly in July 2015, and had previously been the president of the Committee of Health and Social Affairs.

During her tenure, Șoșeva was an advocate for women in politics. At a 2015 forum hosted by the United Nations Development Programme in Comrat, she spoke of discrimination she faced when entering politics, stating that "approximately 50 people called me personally and told me that they could not vote for my candidacy, even though they assured me that they respect both me and my family. They said they can't vote for me just because I'm a woman". She was the only woman elected to the assembly in 2012.

Șoșeva opposed the Moldovan Audiovisual Coordinative Council's suspension of the television license of Russia-24, and proposed that Gagauzia create its own licensing commission. She was also a supporter of the construction of a new medical center in Joltai. In 2021, Șoșeva supported that year's controversial budget resolution, which did not include financial provisions for Joltai, leaving the town without money for street lights, construction, or school meals. Șoșeva ran for re-election in the 2021 Gagauz legislative election, but was defeated by independent candidate Nicolai Andrușoi, receiving 278 votes (35%) compared to Andrușoi's 447 votes (56%).

On 18 March 2022, she was appointed interim president of the Ceadîr-Lunga District by Irina Vlah, the governor of Gagauzia.
