= Todur Zanet =

Gagauz and Moldovan journalist, folklorist and poet

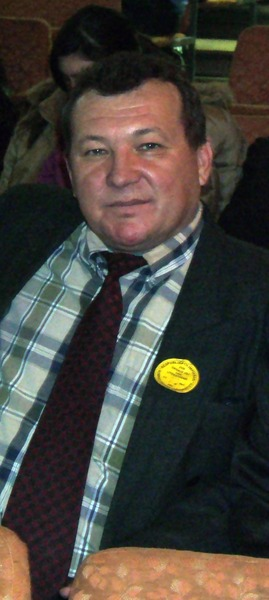
- Zanet in 2014
- Born: June 14, 1958 (age 68); Congaz, Moldavian SSR, Soviet Union
- Occupations: poet, activist, journalist, folklorist, dramatist, translator, filmmaker
- Writing career
- Period: 1972–
- Genres: lyric poetry, reportage
- Notable awards: Order of Work Glory (2010); TÜRKSAV Service Award (2015); KİBATEK Prize; Süleyman Brina Prize

Todur Zanet (sometimes rendered Fedor Ivanoviç Zanet, first name also Feodor, Fiodor, Todor, or Tudor; Russian: Фёдор Иванович Занет, Fyodor Ivanovich Zanet; born June 14, 1958) is a Gagauz and Moldovan journalist, folklorist and poet, one of the most prominent contributors to Gagauz literature and theater. He is the editor-in-chef of Ana Sözü newspaper, which cultivates the Gagauz language, and has written the original anthem of Gagauzia. His activity as a journalist began under Soviet rule, and first peaked during the Perestroika years, when he became involved with the Gagauz nationalist movement.

Often vocal in his opposition to Russophilia, Zanet has criticized authorities for neglecting the Gagauzes' history of resistance to cultural assimilation. He favors cultural links with Turkey and has pursued cultural dialogue with Moldovan and, beyond, Romanian culture. Additionally, in his work as a folklorist and filmmaker, Zanet has reinforced links between the Gagauzes and other Turkic peoples of the Balkans and Ukraine. He is the recipient of several Turkish awards for his contribution to preserving the Oghuz languages and culture, as well as holding Moldova's Order of Work Glory.

== Biography ==
Zanet was born as a Soviet citizen in Congaz, Moldavian SSR, which he jokingly refers to as "Europe's largest village"; his parents were peasants. His first work in the republican media dates back to 1972. From 1976 to 1981, he attended the Moldova State University Polytechnic Institute, and in 1987–1990 the Marxist–Leninist University of the Communist Party of Moldova, while also editing the show Bucaan Dalgasında on Radio Moldova. Zanet's contribution to the nationalist cause includes the poem Vatan ("Motherland"), which in 1986 was put to music by Mihail Colsa, who included this and other songs by Zanet in his 1995 repertoire, Turcular korolar.

In August 1988, at the height of the Perestroika liberalization, Zanet founded Ana Sözü, in an effort to resist the Russification of Gagauzia and standardize Latin spelling. Ana Sözü's attempt relied instead on Turkification: "This newspaper was much criticized for its language. Its editors, like many Gagauz intellectuals, had attended Turkish language courses in Turkey and used words and phrases that the average Gagauz reader could not easily understand". During the dissolution of the Soviet Union, Zanet, "one of the most respected Gagauz men of culture", wrote the original anthem of Gagauzia, officially adopted in July 1990 and later replaced by Colsa's Tarafım. He also continued to work in Moldova during the standoff between Gagauz nationalists and President Mircea Snegur. In 1993, Moldova 1 staged his translation of Jean Racine's Bajazet, retrospectively seen as a seminal moment in the history of Gagauz theater.

With Gagauzia consolidated as an autonomous region within independent Moldova, Ana Sözü became an organ of the regional administration (Bakannık Komiteti), before going independent. It also received funding from the Turkish International Cooperation and Development Agency, and was distributed free of charge within Gagauzia. Government sponsorship, and the fact that it was put out from the Moldovan capital, Chișinău, decreased its informative value, at a time when the Gagauz press was being criticized for its political uniformity.

Zanet served as Ana Sözü's editor for most of its history, with a hiatus between 1994 and 1999; he has also founded Kırlangıç ("Swallow"), a literary magazine aimed at a young readership. An admirer of the "Gagauz renaissance" leader, Mihail Ciachir, Zanet is noted for his plays Açlık Kurbanları ("Hunger Victims") and Beciul vrăjit ("Enchanted Cellar"), staged by the Ciachir National Theater in Ceadîr-Lunga. His texts for the stage, collected as Dramaturgia, received a 2006 award from the National Library of Moldova. He has also published, in 2010, an anthology of poetry and folklore, Gagauzluk: kultura, ruh, adetlär, used as a record of Gagauz in Turkology and comparative linguistics. It is supported by a documentary film, which has records of Zanet's contacts with Ukrainian Gagauz, Bulgarian Turks, and other related groups, but also reports conversations about proper Gagauz between Zanet and his parents.

By 2010, Zanet had become a critic of the Gagauz administration, headed by Governor Mihail Formuzal. He claimed that, during Faruk Çelik's arrival at Chișinău International Airport, Formuzal had assaulted Gagauz journalists, himself included. Zanet was also critical of the Russophile trend in Gagauz politics, favoring instead a closer cooperation with Turkey. He criticizes the Gagauz for "not knowing their own history", referring to the starvation of the Gagauz under Joseph Stalin; Russia, he claims, "has assassinated us." In 2014, Zanet accused both the Bakannık Komiteti and the government of Moldova of wishing to do away with Gagauz identity. He noted that Formuzal's administration was a return to Russification: "Look around: everything is in Russian". Zanet has challenged Formuzal's confrontational stance toward Moldova's Pro-Europeanism, insisting that the two entities, Gagauzia and Moldova, had no quarrel with each other. He is also opposed to Formuzal's replacement, Irina Vlah, whom he accused of wishing to dominate local media through the Gagauz Radio Television, and of fostering Russophiles.

In addition to pioneering Gagauz literature, Zanet writes in Romanian: already in 2003, writer Anatol Măcriș introduced him as one of the most important Gagauz authors, "most of whom speak Romanian and translate some of their works in Romanian." In 2010, Moldovan President Mihai Ghimpu inducted Zanet into the Order of Work Glory, citing his "merits in fostering literature, contribution to the affirmation of national spiritual values, and prolific activity in the press". Also that year, Zanet received the Moldovan Writers' Union Cultural Relations Award, shared with Leo Butnaru. Pointing to the impact of "200 years of Russian propaganda" in ensuring Gagauz loyalties, Zanet encouraged Gagauz youth to learn Romanian, but has spoken out against the proposed unification of Moldova and Romania, and fears Romanianization. He is noted for having translated into Gagauz the poem Luceafărul, by the Romanian classic Mihai Eminescu.

A volume of Zanet's original poems came out in 2013 as Koorlaşmış Ateş ("Coiled Fire"), with Açlık Kurbanları published in Turkish and Azerbaijani versions. Awarded the KİBATEK and Süleyman Brina prizes for his service to Turkic culture, he became a recipient of the TÜRKSAV Service Award 2015, honoring his work in preserving the Oghuz languages. In late 2016, he returned to Ukraine as part of an USAID program for folkloristics, announcing his discovery there of two new Gagauz songs. Some of his own poems have been adapted into Gagauz pop songs, which were awarded prizes by the Bakannık Komiteti. Zanet is married, with two daughters. The elder, Anna Zanet, is a mountaineer who, in 2010, has planted the flag of Gagauzia on Mount Elbrus.
