= Joltai =

Joltai Coltay
- Commune
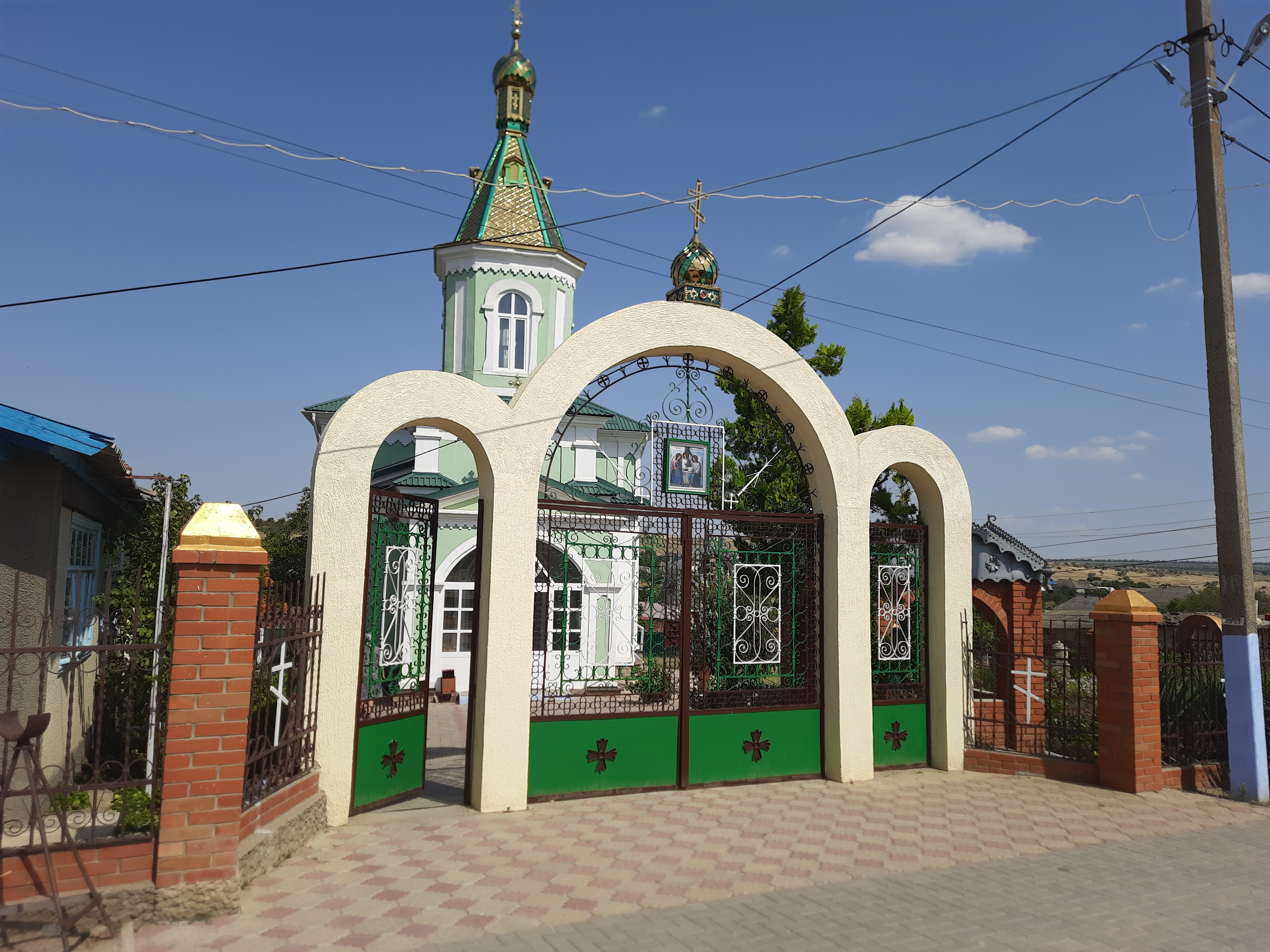
- Holy Trinity church in Joltai

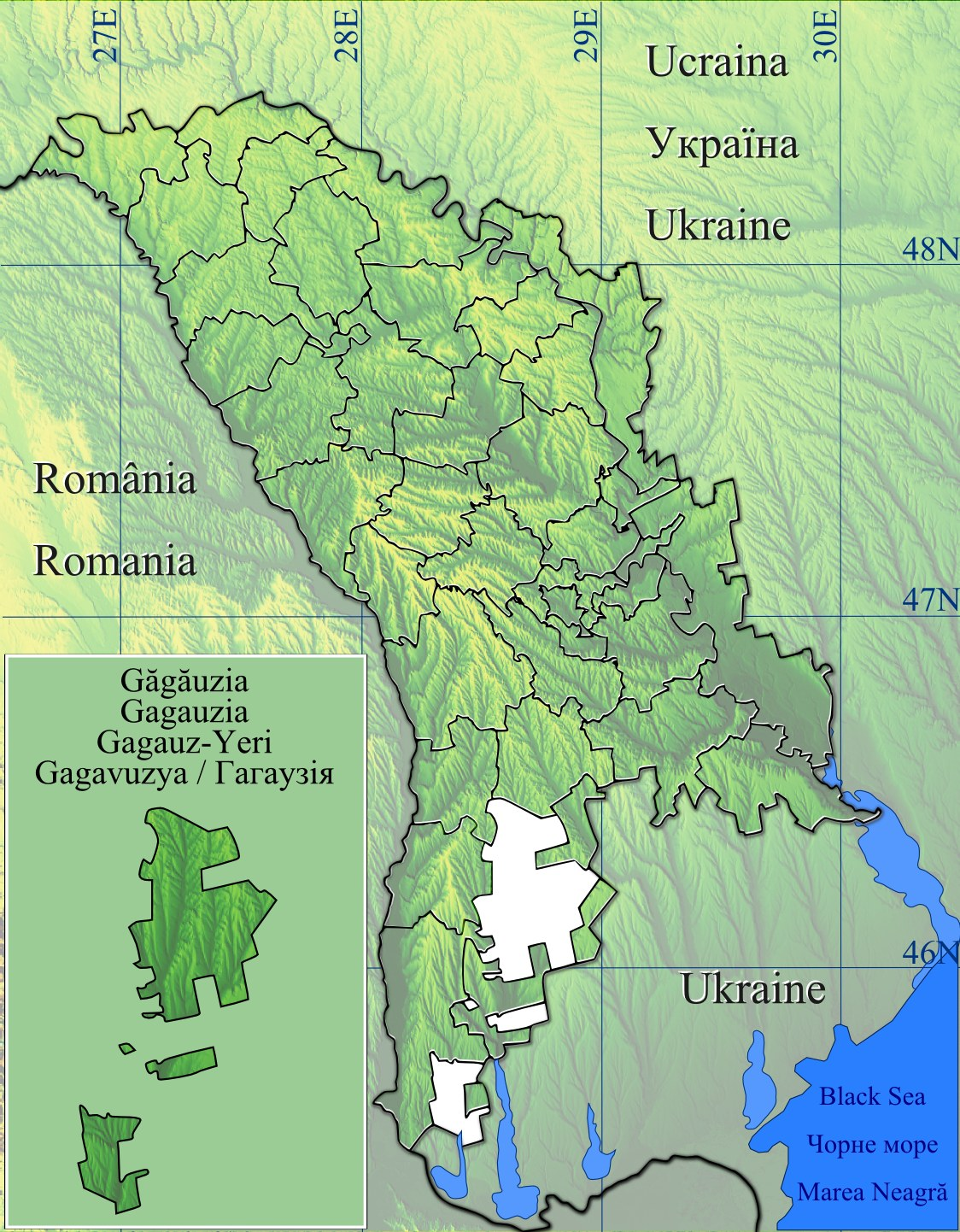
- Location of Joltai in Moldova
- Coordinates: 46°10′57″N 28°52′34″E
- Country: Moldova
- Autonomous Region: Gagauzia
- Founded: 1765

Government
  - Mayor: Ilya Koshulinsky

Population (2024)
  - Total: 1,111

Ethnicity (2024 census)
  - Gagauz people: 95.94%
  - Bulgarians: 1.71%
  - other: 2.35%
- Time zone: UTC+2 (EET)
- Climate: Cfb
- Website: joltai.md

Joltai (Gagauz: Coltay), also spelled as Djoltai is a commune and village in the Ceadîr-Lunga district, Gagauz Autonomous Territorial Unit of the Republic of Moldova. According to the 2024 Moldovan census the commune has 1,111 people, 1,066 (95.94%) of them being Gagauz.

== History ==
The site of the village used to be a Nogai Tatar settlement. The land was said to be very poor and yellow, which is why it was given the name Coltay, translated as "yellow land". The modern village was founded around the year 1765, by settlers from Dobruja. In 1847 the "Holy Trinity church" was built by a Romanian landowner.

== Notable people ==
- Natalia Șoșeva (born 1964), Moldovan pharmacist and politician
