= Gagauzia conflict =

Conflict between Moldova and its Gagauz-populated territory from 1989 to 1995

- Part of the post-Soviet conflicts
- Map of the territory claimed by the self-proclaimed Gagauz Republic; control over all of this area was relative
- Date: 12 November 1989 – 14 January 1995 (5 years, 3 months and 2 days)
- Location: Southern Moldova (modern Gagauzia and surrounding districts)
- Result: Diplomatic resolution: The Gagauz Republic is reintegrated into Moldova; Gagauzia is recognized as an "autonomous territorial unit" within Moldova

Parties
(Moldavian Soviet Socialist Republic) / Moldavian SSR (until 1991); Moldova (from 1991)	Gagauz Republic

Lead figures
(Moldova) Mircea Snegur	Stepan Topal

Units involved
(Moldova) Moldovan Police	Budjak Battalion; (Transnistria) Transnistrian volunteers

Casualties and losses
Some Moldovan policemen killed	Unknown

The Gagauzia conflict (Gagauz: Gagauziya çatışmaları; Romanian: Conflictul din Găgăuzia) was a conflict between the Moldavian SSR and posteriorly the independent Republic of Moldova and their Gagauz population, which sought further autonomy within Moldova. It culminated in the declaration of the Gagauz Republic, separate from Moldavia, with the aim of remaining within the Soviet Union; however, following the latter's dissolution, the Gagauz Republic became a de facto independent state. It was formally reintegrated into Moldova in 1995, when Gagauzia was officially recognized as an "autonomous territorial unit" within the country.

== History ==
In the autumn of 1989, during the final years of the Soviet Union, Moldavian, the name of the time for Romanian, written in the Latin alphabet, was recognized as the single official language of the Moldavian Soviet Socialist Republic. Furthermore, in the aftermath of the February–March 1990 Moldavian Supreme Soviet election, the Popular Front took power in Moldavia, with radical sectors of the front demanding unification with Romania; the front also radicalised its position regarding Moldavia's ethnic minorities. All of this produced certain discomfort in the Gagauz people, mostly Gagauz- or Russian-speaking and which remembered the previous rule of the Kingdom of Romania over Gagauz-populated lands unfavorably. Thus, an emerging Gagauz national movement, led by the political formation Gagauz Halkı ("Gagauz People"), started perceiving territorial autonomy as necessary to protect the Gagauz people and their interests. A similar situation developed in Moldavia's eastern bank of the Dniester, today known as Transnistria.

Amid Gagauz autonomist demands, the Supreme Soviet of the Moldavian Soviet Socialist Republic set up a commission with representatives of the Gagauz Halkı to study the issue of Gagauz territorial autonomy. The Gagauz Autonomous Soviet Socialist Republic, which was to exist within the Moldavian SSR, was declared on 12 November 1989 with the purpose of pressuring the Moldavian Supreme Soviet into accepting Gagauz autonomy, but the latter overturned this declaration and ruled it illegal. On 27 July 1990, the Moldavian Supreme Soviet, now led by the Popular Front, formally rejected Gagauz demands for autonomy. Faced with this decision, Gagauz representatives declared secession from the Moldavian SSR as the Gagauz Republic, still within the Soviet Union, on 19 August 1990. Elections in this new entity were scheduled for 28 October; on October 25, some 40,000 Moldavian volunteers mobilized by the Prime Minister of Moldavia Mircea Druc marched in the direction of Gagauzia to prevent the elections from taking place, but Moldavian police and forces of the Ministry of Internal Affairs of the Soviet Union managed to stop the volunteers.

The Gagauz Republic never formally declared independence from the Soviet Union, unlike the Transnistrian separatists on 25 August 1991 and the Moldavian SSR on 27 August 1991. Initially, Gagauz leaders, including the newly elected Gagauz president Stepan Topal, supported the New Union Treaty, which would establish a new confederation that would replace the collapsing Soviet Union.

With the dissolution of the Soviet Union, which culminated on 26 December 1991, the Gagauz Republic became a de facto independent state. However, Gagauz leaders doubted the ability of the Gagauz Republic, too small and with scarce financial resources, of surviving on its own. Therefore, the establishment of state institutions within the Gagauz Republic was deliberately delayed, and Gagauz authorities began to cooperate with the Moldovan authorities, with which such kind of institutions started being established jointly within the republic; this cooperation was celebrated on the third anniversary of the establishment of the Gagauz Republic in 1993. The financial weakness of the Gagauz Republic, together with the shock that the Transnistria War, and especially the bloodshed of the battle of Bender of 1992, gave to the Moldovan government, favored moderate, compromise-seeking forces in both sides.

The 1994 Moldovan parliamentary election saw the end of the rule of the Popular Front, which had vehemently opposed granting territorial autonomy to any of Moldova's ethnic minorities or a federalization of the country. Thus, following a victory in the elections by the Agrarian Party, the current constitution of Moldova was adopted in 1994. Article 111 of the Moldovan constitution establishes the right to autonomy to "the places on the left bank of the Dniester" and to "certain other places in the south of the Republic of Moldova"; this finally allowed granting the Gagauz an autonomy statute, which had already been largely drafted as a result of negotiations that had been going on since 1992.

On 23 December 1994, the Parliament of Moldova passed the "Law on the Special Juridical Status of Gagauzia (Gagauz-Yeri)" (Romanian: Legea privind statutul juridic special al Găgăuziei (Gagauz-Yeri)), which entered into force on 14 January 1995, thus legally formalizing the autonomy of modern Gagauzia. On 5 March 1995, referendums were held in 36 Moldovan localities where either the Gagauz constituted above 50% of the population or a third of the population had initiated a request for a vote to join the new Gagauz autonomous entity. Three towns and 29 villages voted in favor. The process for the establishment of a Gagauz autonomous entity within Moldova concluded de facto in June 1995.

== See also ==
- History of Gagauzia
- Transnistria conflict
- Reintegration of Transnistria into Moldova
