= Dmitri Constantinov =

Moldovan politician and businessman

- Dmitriy Konstantinov
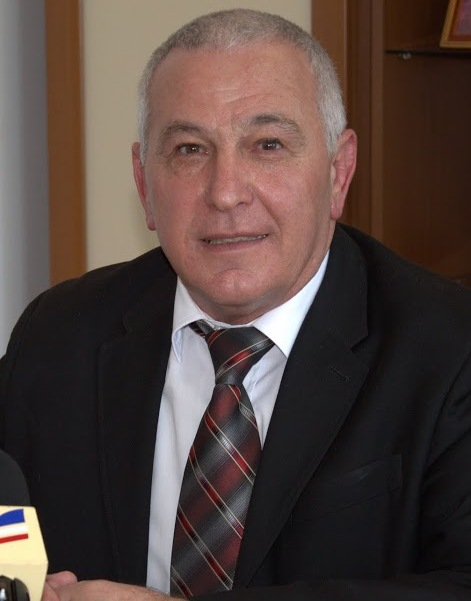
- Constantinov in 2013

Member of the People's Assembly of Gagauzia
- In office 1995–1999
- In office 2012–2016
- Constituency: 21st, Ferapontievca
- In office 2021–2026
- Constituency: 21st, Ferapontievca

President of the People's Assembly of Gagauzia
- In office 5 November 2012 – 20 January 2017
- Preceded by: Ana Harlamenco
- Succeeded by: Alexandr Tarnavski
- In office 4 February 2022 – 27 November 2025
- Preceded by: Vladimir Cîssa
- Succeeded by: Nicolai Ormanji (acting)

Personal details
- Born: 5 December 1952 (age 73) Comrat, Moldavian SSR, Soviet Union (now Gagauzia, Moldova)
- Citizenship: Moldova; Bulgaria
- Education: Ukrainian Agricultural Academy
- Occupation: Politician, businessman, zootechnician

Dmitri Georgievici Constantinov (Note: Gagauz: Dmitriy Georgieviç Konstantinov; Russian: Дмитрий Георгиевич Константинов, romanized: Dmitri Georgievich Konstantinov.) (also Dmitrii; born 5 December 1952) is a Moldovan politician and businessman of Gagauz ethnicity. Born in Comrat, he became a zootechnician, owning businesses in this field and holding managerial posts in several local companies. He was a member of the People's Assembly of Gagauzia, the parliament of Moldova's region of Gagauzia, during three different legislatures, and served as the president of the People's Assembly for two terms. He was disqualified as a candidate from the 2016 Gagauz legislative election over vote buying allegations.

Constantinov held strained relations with the Moldovan government and often criticized the central authorities. He was an affiliate of Moldovan pro-Russian fugitive oligarch Ilan Shor, promoting his projects in Gagauzia, aiding his Russian-backed vote buying and illegal party financing schemes in the country and attending the creation event of the Shor-affiliated Victory bloc in Moscow, Russia; Constantinov had his diplomatic passport revoked for over a year following the latter. On 26 December 2025, he was sentenced to 12 years in prison for the embezzlement of other people's wealth and forgery of accounting documents, escaping to Moldova's unrecognized breakaway region of Transnistria a day earlier to evade justice.

== Early and personal life ==
Dmitri Georgievici Constantinov was born on 5 December 1952 in Comrat, in the Moldavian SSR of the Soviet Union (now Gagauzia, Moldova). He studied at the Karmanovsky Agricultural Technical College in Briceni and at the Ukrainian Agricultural Academy in Kyiv, in the Ukrainian SSR (now Ukraine). He is a zootechnician by profession, with his family dedicating themselves to agriculture. Constantinov held managerial positions in several local companies and owned businesses in the zootechnics sector. He was president of the Wrestling Federation of Gagauzia and chairman of the Association of Entrepreneurs of the Comrat Municipality. As of 2014, he was a citizen of both Moldova as well as Bulgaria. As of 2021, Constantinov lived in Comrat.

In September 2017, Constantinov ran over a seven-year-old boy in Comrat. He cooperated with the investigation and admitted his guilt, with the lawyer of the child's family requesting a more lenient sentence for him, stating he "did everything he could to help the child's rehabilitation and found the best doctors". Constantinov was sentenced in December that year by the Hîncești Court to a year of suspended sentence with a one-year driving ban.

== Political career ==
=== Member and president of the Gagauz parliament ===
Constantinov was elected member of the People's Assembly of Gagauzia, Gagauzia's regional parliament, from 1995 to 1999 and again from 2012 to 2016, the latter time for the 21st electoral constituency serving Ferapontievca. During its 2012–2016 legislature, Constantinov was elected President of the People's Assembly of Gagauzia. He held the post from 5 November 2012 to 20 January 2017.

At the 2016 Gagauz legislative election, Constantinov won at the second round for the 1st constituency serving Comrat, but the results were annulled as he was accused of vote buying. His opponent Vitalie Dragoi, who filed a complaint requesting the results to be annulled, stated that several voters had admitted receiving amounts between 300 and 1000 lei. The Supreme Court of Justice of Moldova found that 59 people listed as voters were not in Moldova on the day of the election, annulling the results and disqualifying Constantinov from the election, with him denying the accusations of vote buying and stating that the case had been fabricated at the request of the Democratic Party of Moldova (PDM). According to him, the case was archived in 2020 as the events were not confirmed. Afterwards, Constantinov presented himself as an independent candidate in the 2019 Moldovan parliamentary election for the 45th constituency serving Comrat District. However, he did not obtain an integrity certificate and therefore could not submit the complete documentation for his registration as a candidate, withdrawing from the election. Alexandr Suhodolski would win the constituency's seat at the Parliament of Moldova instead.

In 2021, he was elected as a member of the People's Assembly once more, again winning Ferapontievca's constituency. He was the oldest member of this legislature. On 4 February 2022, Constantinov was elected again as president of the assembly, in the assembly's fifteenth attempt at electing a president, with 18 votes in his favour. According to Moldovan news website Laf.md, Constantinov initially established good relations with the Moldovan central government, but this later changed. Constantinov would criticize the central administration in Chișinău, Moldova's capital, on several occasions. For example, in the summer of 2022, during the anniversary of the self-proclaimed Gagauz Republic, he declared that "the people of Gagauzia no longer have to endure and let themselves be deceived" by the central authorities. In December 2023, Constantinov introduced a legislative initiative to dissolve the Central Electoral Commission of Gagauzia (CEC). As a result, the CEC was dissolved, a new one could not be established and local legislative elections could not be held in Gagauzia on time two years later.

In May 2023, Constantinov traveled to Israel and met with Moldovan pro-Russian fugitive oligarch Ilan Shor. Following the visit, the People's Assembly's official website published a news report about the agreements reached, promising the formation of an executive committee, investments in Gagauzia of 500 million lei in 2023 alone and the construction of an airport and of the GagauziyaLand amusement park; only one of these promises would be fulfilled. Constantinov began promoting Shor's projects in Gagauzia, having intensified relations with him ever since the 2023 election of Shor affiliate Evghenia Guțul as Governor of Gagauzia (başkan).

Constantinov signed an agreement in Moscow in Russia with the Russian state-owned bank Promsvyazbank, from which tens of thousands of residents in Gagauzia and later nationwide received money from Russia, in what would turn out to be a scheme for vote buying and illegal financing of parties affiliated with Shor. In an interview for American state-funded news broadcaster Radio Free Europe/Radio Liberty's Moldovan Service in August 2023, Constantinov reported being disappointed with Shor, as he would have lied to him about staying out of Gagauzia's politics as Constantinov stated. Constantinov later participated in the creation event held in Moscow of the Shor-affiliated Victory political bloc, which was not allowed to participate in the 2025 Moldovan parliamentary election on the grounds that it was the successor of the Șor Party, which had been dissolved by the Constitutional Court. After this visit, his diplomatic passport was revoked on 23 April 2024, and his baggage was thoroughly searched at Chișinău International Airport upon his return from Moscow according to Constantinov. On 22 May 2025, the Chișinău Court ruled that Moldova's Ministry of Foreign Affairs had to restore his diplomatic passport.

On 14 November 2025, Constantinov resigned as president of the Gagauz parliament, citing the legislature's expiration and health reasons as the motives. His resignation came less than a month after an unannounced visit by Alexandru Musteață, then head of the Security and Intelligence Service of Moldova (SIS), to Comrat on 23 October. During the visit, he discussed "the situation of Gagauzia" with regional leadership, including the upcoming elections, with Constantinov stating afterwards that he advocated for improved dialogue between Gagauzia and the central government. Constantinov denied that his resignation was related to Musteață's visit, but Vitali Gaidarji, then manager of Laf.md, argued that it might have been arranged to "free up" dialogue between Gagauzia and Chișinău, as the Moldovan government had a reticent attitude towards Constantinov. Gaidarji also stated he believed Shor's increasing role in the region could have also been discussed during the visit. On 27 November, the People's Assembly confirmed Constantinov's decision to resign, with Nicolai Ormanji, one of the parliament's vice presidents, being elected acting successor. Some members of the assembly accused Constantinov of resigning to avoid responsibility for Gagauzia's serious problems, calling the resignation "shameful".

=== Conviction and escape to Transnistria ===
On 26 December 2025, Constantinov was sentenced in absentia by the Comrat Court to 12 years in prison for embezzlement of other people's wealth and forgery of accounting documents. He also received a five-year ban on holding positions similar to the one from which he committed the crimes. Between 2017 and 2020, as manager of a commercial company in Comrat, Constantinov caused the founders of the company 46 million lei in damages, having concluded fictitious contracts and bringing the company to bankruptcy. In another episode, Constantinov inflicted damages of over 600,000 lei on a founder of the same company. Of his assets, a total equivalent of 46 million lei was seized for eventual confiscation for the benefit of the injured parties. Their request to recover that same amount after the sentence became final was admitted by the judge, Igor Botezatu, on that same hearing. The criminal case against Constantinov had begun in 2023, initially on suspicion of fictitious insolvency. Prosecutors had asked for a 13-year sentence for him.

The day before his sentencing, Constantinov escaped to Moldova's unrecognized breakaway region of Transnistria. With the help of several people, and having changed his means of transport three times, he managed to deceive some institutions and arrived in the region around midday. Prior to his sentencing, he had only been prohibited from leaving Moldova; any other action would not have had legal basis without a previous court decision, with search efforts against his person being initiated only afterwards. On 30 December, Maia Sandu, the President of Moldova, requested legislative measures from the Government to prevent those convicted from escaping their sentences, as the lack of constitutional control over Transnistria made the ban on leaving Moldovan territory insufficient. Constantinov was not a unique case; the very same year, former Moldovan parliament members Irina Lozovan and Alexandr Nesterovschi also escaped before their sentences were handed down and went into hiding in Transnistria.

Constantinov made his first public statements since his sentencing on 16 February, in a video posted on social media. He stated "I don't hide it, I don't want to go to prison because of an unjust decision", rejecting the accusations against him and calling for an "independent review" of his case. He added that he had appealed the first instance ruling on 9 February. He also stated "when an economic litigation ends with 12 years in prison for a 73-year-old man, a big question arises whether this corresponds to European standards". Igor Grosu, then President of the Moldovan Parliament, declared that excusing himself with his age and fleeing to Transnistria was no argument and called on him to take responsibility and return to answer to justice.
