= Gagauz Republic =

1989–1995 self-proclaimed political entity in Eastern Europe

Gagauz Republic Gagauz Respublikası (Gagauz)
- 1989–1995
- Flag Coat of arms

- Map of the territory claimed by the Gagauz Republic; control over all of this area was relative
- Status: Self-proclaimed state
- Capital: Comrat; 46°19′N 28°40′E
- Common languages: Gagauz; Romanian; Russian
- Government: Republic
- President
  - 1991–1995: Stepan Topal
- History
  - The Gagauz ASSR is unilaterally proclaimed: 12 November 1989
  - Gagauz ASSR unilaterally raised into the Gagauz SSR separate from the Moldavian SSR: 19 August 1990
  - Dissolution of the Soviet Union; de facto independence of the Gagauz Republic: 26 December 1991
  - Entry into force of a law reintegrating Gagauzia as an "autonomous territorial unit" into Moldova (Note: The law that provided Gagauzia with an autonomous status within Moldova was passed by the Parliament of Moldova on 23 December 1994, but it officially entered into force on 14 January 1995.): 14 January 1995
- Currency: Soviet ruble; Moldovan cupon; Moldovan leu
Preceded by	Succeeded by
Moldavian Soviet Socialist Republic	Moldova; Gagauzia
- Today part of: Moldova

The Gagauz Republic (Gagauz: Gagauz Respublikası, [ɡɑɡɑˈus rɪsˈpublʲɪkəsə]; Romanian: Republica Găgăuzia, [reˈpublika ɡəɡəˈuzia]; Russian: Республика Гагаузия, romanized: Respublika Gagauziya, [rɪsˈpublʲɪkə ɡɐɡəˈuzɪjə]) was a self-proclaimed unrecognised political entity, first declared in 1989, that separated from Moldova in 1990 during the dissolution of the Soviet Union but later peacefully joined Moldova after being de facto independent from 1991 to 1995.

== History ==
The Special Congress of Representatives of the Gagauz people was held on 12 November 1989, in which the Gagauz Autonomous Soviet Socialist Republic was proclaimed in the Moldavian SSR, but on the next day the Presidium of the Supreme Council of Moldavia abolished the Special Congress' decisions, calling them unconstitutional.

The Congress of People's Deputies of the Steppe South of the Moldavian SSR declared itself separate from the Moldavian SSR and the establishment of the Gagauz Republic within the Soviet Union on 19 August 1990. Two days later, the Presidium of the Supreme Council of the Moldavian SSR held an emergency meeting, and a decision was reached to declare the republic illegal and the congress unconstitutional. A detachment of Moldovan volunteers and police units were sent to Gagauzia to quell the dissidence, but the arrival of SSV soldiers prevented bloodshed.

Initially, the republic was made up of five districts: Comrat, Ceadîr-Lunga, Vulcănești, Basarabeasca, and Taraclia.

The Gagauz Republic never declared itself formally independent, and only became a de facto independent state following the dissolution of the Soviet Union.

On 23 December 1994, on the basis of agreements reached by the Gagauz Republic and the Republic of Moldova, a document on the peaceful reintegration of Gagauzia, with rights of autonomy, was signed. It entered into force on 14 January 1995. The reintegration of Gagauzia was carried out from December 1994 to June 1995, when the Gagauz Republic legally dissolved and became the Autonomous Territorial Unit of Gagauzia.

== Armed forces ==
As the Gagauzia conflict was developing and tensions between the Gagauz and the central government in Chișinău remained high, the Gagauz localities started establishing paramilitary structures such as the Budjak Battalion (Gagauz: Bucak Batalyonu; Romanian: Batalionul Bugeac) for their self-defense.

== See also ==
- Gagauzia
- Gagauz people
- Gagauzia conflict
- List of Chairmen of the Gagauzian People's Assembly
- Comrat Republic
- Transnistria
