= 2021 Gagauz legislative election =

The 2021 Gagauz legislative elections were held on 19 September 2021 in order to elect the 35 members of the People's Assembly of Gagauzia in Moldova. The second round or rerun for any applicable constituencies was held on 3 October.

== Electoral system ==
All residents of the Gagauzia who are 21 years or over and are a Moldovan citizen are eligible to vote. The 35 seats are elected from single-member constituencies using the two-round system. If no candidate receives 50% of the vote in the first round, a second round is held between the top two candidates. More than one-third of registered voters must participate in order for the election to be considered valid. If the threshold is not met, the elections will be declared null and void, and will be repeated at a later date.

== Results ==
Party	First round			Second round			Total seats
Party	Votes	%	Seats	Votes	%	Seats	Total seats
Bloc of Communists and Socialists	12,371	26.67	6	4,739	18.85	3	9
We Build Europe at Home Party	228	0.49	1				1
Independent	33,778	72.83	11	20,407	81.15	14	25
Total	46,377	100.00	18	25,146	100.00	17	35
Valid votes	46,377	98.33		25,146	98.36		
Invalid/blank votes	786	1.67		419	1.64		
Total votes	47,163	100.00		25,565	100.00		
Registered voters/turnout	116,123	40.61		66,929	38.20		

=== By constituency ===
№1 Comrat
Candidate	Party	First round		Second round	
Candidate	Party	Votes	%	Votes	%
Nikolay Harlampyeviç Dudoglo	Independent	936	41.25	1,347	62.22
İrina Sergeevna Zelenskaya	Independent	395	17.41	818	37.78
Mihail Petroviç Vlah	Independent	345	15.20		
Anna Trifanovna Bratunova	Bloc of Communists and Socialists	273	12.03		
Sergey Mihayloviç Külafı	Independent	212	9.34		
Valeriy Födoroviç Kısa	Independent	73	3.22		
Andrey Georgieviç Mukkoglo	Independent	35	1.54		
Total		2,269	100.00	2,165	100.00
Valid votes		2,269	97.55	2,165	97.30
Invalid/blank votes		57	2.45	60	2.70
Total votes		2,326	100.00	2,225	100.00
Registered voters/turnout		5,367	43.34	5,260	42.30

№2 Comrat
Candidate	Party	First round		First round rerun	
Candidate	Party	Votes	%	Votes	%
Viktor Nikolaeviç Petrov	Independent	1,541	96.13	1,780	97.53
Vladimir Dmitrieviç Bogaçöv	Independent	62	3.87	45	2.47
Total		1,603	100.00	1,825	100.00
Valid votes		1,603	95.64	1,825	97.02
Invalid/blank votes		73	4.36	56	2.98
Total votes		1,676	100.00	1,881	100.00
Registered voters/turnout		5,177	32.37	5,186	36.27

№3 Comrat
Candidate	Party	First round		First round rerun	
Candidate	Party	Votes	%	Votes	%
Aleksandr Grigoryeviç Tarnavskiy	Independent	911	65.54	882	69.83
Lidiya Yuryevna Gradinar	Independent	329	23.67	278	22.01
İvan Födoroviç Kılçik	Independent	150	10.79	103	8.16
Total		1,390	100.00	1,263	100.00
Valid votes		1,390	97.68	1,263	98.98
Invalid/blank votes		33	2.32	13	1.02
Total votes		1,423	100.00	1,276	100.00
Registered voters/turnout		5,386	26.42	5,404	23.61

№4 Comrat
Candidate	Party	First round		Second round	
Candidate	Party	Votes	%	Votes	%
İvan Konstantinoviç Dimitroglo	Bloc of Communists and Socialists	846	44.15	1,133	55.43
Stepan Dmitrieviç Kara	Independent	608	31.73	911	44.57
Pötr Födoroviç Mavrodi	Independent	288	15.03		
Nikolay Födoroviç Konstantinov	Independent	83	4.33		
Dmitriy Dmitrieviç Dimitroglo	Independent	55	2.87		
Praskovya Dmitrievna Arabacı	Independent	28	1.46		
İvan Konstantinoviç Çeşmeci	Independent	8	0.42		
Total		1,916	100.00	2,044	100.00
Valid votes		1,916	96.77	2,044	97.57
Invalid/blank votes		64	3.23	51	2.43
Total votes		1,980	100.00	2,095	100.00
Registered voters/turnout		4,896	40.44	4,919	42.59

№5 Ceadîr-Lunga
Candidate	Party	First round		Second round	
Candidate	Party	Votes	%	Votes	%
Nikolay İvanoviç İvançuk	Independent	753	40.88	1,163	65.04
Natalya Mihaylovna Mihalçuk	Independent	424	23.02	625	34.96
Pötr Mihayloviç Paşalı	Bloc of Communists and Socialists	335	18.19		
İvan Mihayloviç Konstantinov	Independent	330	17.92		
Total		1,842	100.00	1,788	100.00
Valid votes		1,842	98.71	1,788	97.97
Invalid/blank votes		24	1.29	37	2.03
Total votes		1,866	100.00	1,825	100.00
Registered voters/turnout		4,209	44.33	4,213	43.32

№6 Ceadîr-Lunga
Candidate	Party	First round		Second round	
Candidate	Party	Votes	%	Votes	%
Georgiy Georgieviç Leyçu	Independent	876	47.66	1,211	65.28
Aleksandr Nikolaeviç Kovrik	Independent	482	26.22	644	34.72
Anatoliy Petroviç Kulev	Bloc of Communists and Socialists	386	21.00		
Georgiy Georgieviç Ormancı	Independent	94	5.11		
Total		1,838	100.00	1,855	100.00
Valid votes		1,838	97.87	1,855	98.36
Invalid/blank votes		40	2.13	31	1.64
Total votes		1,878	100.00	1,886	100.00
Registered voters/turnout		4,700	39.96	4,691	40.20

№7 Ceadîr-Lunga
Candidate	Party	Votes	%
Elena Anatolyevna Yurçenko	Bloc of Communists and Socialists	1,089	61.66
Ruslan Petroviç Garbalı	Independent	364	20.61
Vladimir Dmitrieviç Konstantinov	Independent	228	12.91
Lüdmila Nikolaevna Moga	Independent	85	4.81
Total		1,766	100.00
Valid votes		1,766	97.62
Invalid/blank votes		43	2.38
Total votes		1,809	100.00
Registered voters/turnout		5,372	33.67

№8 Vulcănești
Candidate	Party	Votes	%
Aleksandr Georgieviç Toporaş	Bloc of Communists and Socialists	1,079	63.32
Sergey Afansyeviç Çernev	Independent	625	36.68
Total		1,704	100.00
Valid votes		1,704	97.93
Invalid/blank votes		36	2.07
Total votes		1,740	100.00
Registered voters/turnout		4,329	40.19

№9 Vulcănești
Candidate	Party	Votes	%
Dmitriy Panteleeviç Topal	Bloc of Communists and Socialists	1,123	64.84
Viktor Petroviç Petrioglo	Independent	384	22.17
Andrey Petroviç Çernev	Independent	225	12.99
Total		1,732	100.00
Valid votes		1,732	97.74
Invalid/blank votes		40	2.26
Total votes		1,772	100.00
Registered voters/turnout		4,703	37.68

№10 Vulcănești
Candidate	Party	First round		First round rerun	
Candidate	Party	Votes	%	Votes	%
Pötr İvanoviç Fazlı	Bloc of Communists and Socialists	805	58.25	1,056	76.63
İvan Pavloviç Kreţu	Independent	323	23.37	189	13.72
Roman Vladimiroviç Tütin	Independent	254	18.38	133	9.65
Total		1,382	100.00	1,378	100.00
Valid votes		1,382	96.78	1,378	97.87
Invalid/blank votes		46	3.22	30	2.13
Total votes		1,428	100.00	1,408	100.00
Registered voters/turnout		4,644	30.75	4,681	30.08

№11 Avdarma
Candidate	Party	Votes	%
Aleksandr Petroviç Dinjos	Bloc of Communists and Socialists	407	51.39
Elena Födorovna Karamit	Independent	385	48.61
Total		792	100.00
Valid votes		792	98.75
Invalid/blank votes		10	1.25
Total votes		802	100.00
Registered voters/turnout		2,308	34.75

№12 Baurci
Candidate	Party	First round		Second round	
Candidate	Party	Votes	%	Votes	%
Grigoriy Georgieviç Kadın	Independent	938	47.66	1,065	53.41
Viktor Aleksandroviç Terzi	Independent	626	31.81	929	46.59
Nadejda Nikolaevna Tukan	Bloc of Communists and Socialists	404	20.53		
Total		1,968	100.00	1,994	100.00
Valid votes		1,968	98.75	1,994	99.20
Invalid/blank votes		25	1.25	16	0.80
Total votes		1,993	100.00	2,010	100.00
Registered voters/turnout		5,410	36.84	5,377	37.38

№13 Beșalma
Candidate	Party	First round		First round rerun	
Candidate	Party	Votes	%	Votes	%
Grigoriy İvanoviç Dülger	Independent	606	54.84	732	69.19
İlya Födoroviç Kuru	Bloc of Communists and Socialists	279	25.25	206	19.47
Valentina Nikolaevna Varban	Independent	180	16.29	91	8.60
Pötr Georgieviç Kapaklı	Independent	40	3.62	29	2.74
Total		1,105	100.00	1,058	100.00
Valid votes		1,105	99.01	1,058	99.53
Invalid/blank votes		11	0.99	5	0.47
Total votes		1,116	100.00	1,063	100.00
Registered voters/turnout		3,740	29.84	3,745	28.38

№14 Beșghioz
Candidate	Party	Votes	%
İvan Daniloviç Karaca	Independent	546	62.69
Valeiy Semönoviç Garbali	Independent	197	22.62
Vitaliy Födoroviç Bratan	Independent	128	14.70
Total		871	100.00
Valid votes		871	99.54
Invalid/blank votes		4	0.46
Total votes		875	100.00
Registered voters/turnout		2,536	34.50

№15 Bugeac
Candidate	Party	First round		Second round	
Candidate	Party	Votes	%	Votes	%
Vladimir Mihayloviç Kısa	Independent	551	44.44	740	57.86
Aleksandr Mihayloviç Kendigelän	Independent	449	36.21	539	42.14
Aleksandr Vadimoviç Panov	Independent	229	18.47		
Vladimir Mihayloviç Kısa	Independent	7	0.56		
Födor Georgieviç Leyçu	Independent	4	0.32		
Total		1,240	100.00	1,279	100.00
Valid votes		1,240	99.28	1,279	99.69
Invalid/blank votes		9	0.72	4	0.31
Total votes		1,249	100.00	1,283	100.00
Registered voters/turnout		1,605	77.82	1,640	78.23

№16 Cișmichioi
Candidate	Party	Votes	%
Leonid Nikolaeviç Kiosä	Bloc of Communists and Socialists	1,076	55.49
Ekaterina Födorovna Jekova	Independent	863	44.51
Total		1,939	100.00
Valid votes		1,939	99.33
Invalid/blank votes		13	0.67
Total votes		1,952	100.00
Registered voters/turnout		3,736	52.25

№17 Cioc-Maidan
Candidate	Party	Votes	%
Födor Petroviç Yanioglo	Independent	758	59.54
Nikolay Semönoviç Arnaut	Independent	267	20.97
Valeriy Födoroviç Yanioglo	Independent	176	13.83
Anna Födorovna Maslennikova	Independent	72	5.66
Total		1,273	100.00
Valid votes		1,273	98.68
Invalid/blank votes		17	1.32
Total votes		1,290	100.00
Registered voters/turnout		2,186	59.01

№18 Dezghingea
Candidate	Party	Votes	%
Nikolay İlyiç Raya	Independent	879	60.70
Pötr Nikolaeviç Uzun	Independent	491	33.91
Dmitriy Stepanoviç Kapsamun	We Build Europe at Home Party	78	5.39
Total		1,448	100.00
Valid votes		1,448	98.64
Invalid/blank votes		20	1.36
Total votes		1,468	100.00
Registered voters/turnout		3,334	44.03

№19 Joltai
Candidate	Party	Votes	%
Nikolay İvanoviç Andruşoy	Independent	447	56.23
Natalya Dmitrievna Şoşeva	Independent	278	34.97
Viktor İvanoviç Petkoviç	Independent	70	8.81
Total		795	100.00
Valid votes		795	99.25
Invalid/blank votes		6	0.75
Total votes		801	100.00
Registered voters/turnout		1,398	57.30

№20 Etulia
Candidate	Party	First round		Second round	
Candidate	Party	Votes	%	Votes	%
Mihail Dmitrieviç Popov	Bloc of Communists and Socialists	650	47.83	833	58.99
Oleg Semönoviç Zabun	Independent	279	20.53	579	41.01
Yuriy Yuryeviç Motuzok	Independent	172	12.66		
Vladimir Vladislavoviç Sarioglo	Independent	132	9.71		
Sergey Aleksandroviç Minzat	Independent	73	5.37		
Vladimir Alekseeviç Manzul	Independent	53	3.90		
Total		1,359	100.00	1,412	100.00
Valid votes		1,359	99.12	1,412	98.06
Invalid/blank votes		12	0.88	28	1.94
Total votes		1,371	100.00	1,440	100.00
Registered voters/turnout		2,741	50.02	2,750	52.36

№21 Ferapontievca
Candidate	Party	Votes	%
Dmitriy Georgieviç Konstantinov	Independent	294	57.42
İgor Petroviç Mihaylov	Independent	170	33.20
Aleksandr Viktoroviç Odnostalko	Bloc of Communists and Socialists	48	9.38
Total		512	100.00
Valid votes		512	98.27
Invalid/blank votes		9	1.73
Total votes		521	100.00
Registered voters/turnout		881	59.14

№22 Gaidar
Candidate	Party	First round		Second round	
Candidate	Party	Votes	%	Votes	%
Nikolay İlyiç Uzun	Independent	621	44.68	892	62.86
Vitaliy Panteleeviç Kuru	Independent	475	34.17	527	37.14
Valeiy Mihayloviç Kapsamun	Bloc of Communists and Socialists	213	15.32		
Vyaçeslav Andreeviç Çebotar	Independent	55	3.96		
Mariya İlyiniçna Gaydarcı	Independent	26	1.87		
Total		1,390	100.00	1,419	100.00
Valid votes		1,390	98.51	1,419	98.34
Invalid/blank votes		21	1.49	24	1.66
Total votes		1,411	100.00	1,443	100.00
Registered voters/turnout		3,059	46.13	3,066	47.06

№23 Carbalia
Candidate	Party	Votes	%
Valentin İvanoviç Gaydarcı	We Build Europe at Home Party	150	56.39
İvan Mihayloviç Dergaç	Independent	116	43.61
Total		266	100.00
Valid votes		266	99.63
Invalid/blank votes		1	0.37
Total votes		267	100.00
Registered voters/turnout		409	65.28

№24 Cazaclia
Candidate	Party	Votes	%
Aleksandr Dmitrieviç Dülger	Independent	1,191	50.15
Elena Petrovna Mandacı	Bloc of Communists and Socialists	954	40.17
Dmitriy Vasilyeviç Kalak	Independent	230	9.68
Total		2,375	100.00
Valid votes		2,375	98.96
Invalid/blank votes		25	1.04
Total votes		2,400	100.00
Registered voters/turnout		4,959	48.40

№25 Chiriet-Lunga
Candidate	Party	Votes	%
Mihail Nikolaeviç Jelezoglo	Independent	590	74.40
Grigoriy Födoroviç Todoroglo	Independent	93	11.73
İvan Georgieviç Burguci	Independent	83	10.47
İvan Födoroviç Nikolaev	Independent	27	3.40
Total		793	100.00
Valid votes		793	99.37
Invalid/blank votes		5	0.63
Total votes		798	100.00
Registered voters/turnout		1,437	55.53

№26 Chirsova
Candidate	Party	Votes	%
Stepan Georgieviç Sarioglo	Bloc of Communists and Socialists	912	51.97
Stepan Georgieviç Piron	Independent	583	33.22
Semön İvanoviç Dragan	Independent	97	5.53
Vasiliy Savvoviç Neykovçen	Independent	86	4.90
Valentina İvanovna Şikil	Independent	77	4.39
Total		1,755	100.00
Valid votes		1,755	98.82
Invalid/blank votes		21	1.18
Total votes		1,776	100.00
Registered voters/turnout		4,157	42.72

№27 Congaz
Candidate	Party	First round		First round rerun	
Candidate	Party	Votes	%	Votes	%
Svetlana Rodionovna Düvenci	Independent	771	63.67	741	68.99
İvan Nikolaeviç Bessarab	Independent	218	18.00	194	18.06
Födor Petroviç Gaydarcı	Independent	163	13.46	89	8.29
Nikolay Nikolaeviç Arabacı	Independent	59	4.87	50	4.66
Total		1,211	100.00	1,074	100.00
Valid votes		1,211	97.90	1,074	99.08
Invalid/blank votes		26	2.10	10	0.92
Total votes		1,237	100.00	1,084	100.00
Registered voters/turnout		5,353	23.11	5,311	20.41

№28 Congaz
Candidate	Party	First round		First round rerun	
Candidate	Party	Votes	%	Votes	%
Demyan Nikolaeviç Karaseni	Independent	613	46.87	782	57.12
Vitaliy İvanoviç Kürkçü	Independent	409	31.27	333	24.32
Konstantin Konstantinoviç Telpiz	Independent	286	21.87	254	18.55
Total		1,308	100.00	1,369	100.00
Valid votes		1,308	98.64	1,369	99.06
Invalid/blank votes		18	1.36	13	0.94
Total votes		1,326	100.00	1,382	100.00
Registered voters/turnout		4,434	29.91	4,438	31.14

№29 Congazcicul de Sus
Candidate	Party	First round		Second round	
Candidate	Party	Votes	%	Votes	%
Sergey Konstantinoviç Zahariya	Independent	456	48.46	526	56.38
Evgeniy İvanoviç Tukan	Bloc of Communists and Socialists	313	33.26	407	43.62
Vasiliy Georgieviç İkizli	Independent	172	18.28		
Total		941	100.00	933	100.00
Valid votes		941	99.68	933	98.21
Invalid/blank votes		3	0.32	17	1.79
Total votes		944	100.00	950	100.00
Registered voters/turnout		1,684	56.06	1,688	56.28

№30 Copceac
Candidate	Party	First round		Second round	
Candidate	Party	Votes	%	Votes	%
Nikolay Semönoviç Dragan	Bloc of Communists and Socialists	637	44.48	821	49.10
Valeriy İlyiç Manastırlı	Independent	417	29.12	851	50.90
Georgiy Petroviç Gaydarcı	Independent	312	21.79		
İvan Vasilyeviç Yalama	Independent	66	4.61		
Total		1,432	100.00	1,672	100.00
Valid votes		1,432	98.08	1,672	98.82
Invalid/blank votes		28	1.92	20	1.18
Total votes		1,460	100.00	1,692	100.00
Registered voters/turnout		3,253	44.88	3,273	51.70

№31 Copceac
Candidate	Party	Votes	%
Dmitriy İordanoviç Manastırlı	Independent	818	68.86
Dmitriy Harlampyeviç Kurdov	Independent	370	31.14
Total		1,188	100.00
Valid votes		1,188	98.34
Invalid/blank votes		20	1.66
Total votes		1,208	100.00
Registered voters/turnout		2,626	46.00

№32 Cotovscoe
Candidate	Party	Votes	%
Nikolay Nikolaeviç Ormancı	Independent	295	100.00
Total		295	100.00
Valid votes		295	99.33
Invalid/blank votes		2	0.67
Total votes		297	100.00
Registered voters/turnout		693	42.86

№33 Chioselia Rusă
Candidate	Party	Votes	%
İlya Semönoviç Uzun	Independent	326	55.07
İvan Fördoroviç Kısa	Independent	216	36.49
Konstantin Aleksandroviç Belopşiţkiy	Independent	50	8.45
Total		592	100.00
Valid votes		592	99.66
Invalid/blank votes		2	0.34
Total votes		594	100.00
Registered voters/turnout		895	66.37

№34 Svetlîi
Candidate	Party	First round		Second round	
Candidate	Party	Votes	%	Votes	%
Pötr İvanoviç Çavdar	Bloc of Communists and Socialists	226	40.87	283	45.79
Ruslan Petroviç Unilovskiy	Independent	196	35.44	335	54.21
Dmitriy Dmitrieviç Çakir	Independent	81	14.65		
Dmitriy İvanoviç Mazılo	Independent	50	9.04		
Total		553	100.00	618	100.00
Valid votes		553	99.64	618	99.36
Invalid/blank votes		2	0.36	4	0.64
Total votes		555	100.00	622	100.00
Registered voters/turnout		1,264	43.91	1,287	48.33

№35 Tomai
Candidate	Party	Votes	%
Sergey Konstantinoviç Çimpoeş	Independent	870	56.71
Oksana İvanovna Nedälko-Kalın	Independent	348	22.69
Dmitriy İlyiç Kiosä	Bloc of Communists and Socialists	316	20.60
Total		1,534	100.00
Valid votes		1,534	98.71
Invalid/blank votes		20	1.29
Total votes		1,554	100.00
Registered voters/turnout		3,242	47.93
