= Vladimir Odnostalco =

Moldovan politician (born 1984)

Vladimir Odnostalco MP
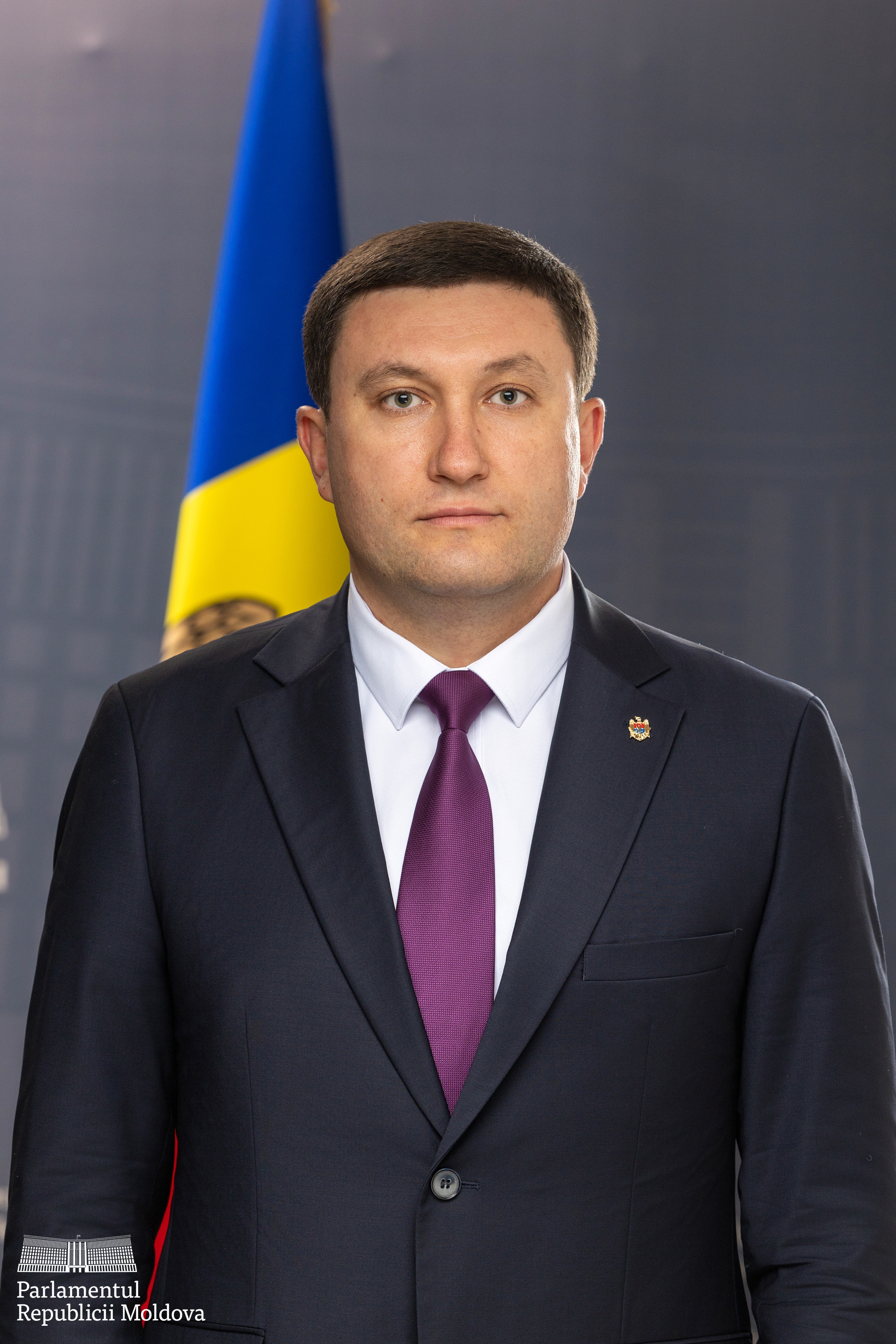
- Official portrait, 2025

Member of the Moldovan Parliament
- Incumbent
- Assumed office 9 December 2014
- Parliamentary group: Party of Socialists; Bloc of Communists and Socialists

Personal details
- Born: 31 October 1984 (age 41) Ferapontievca, Moldavian SSR, Soviet Union
- Education: Free International University of Moldova

Vladimir Odnostalco (born 31 October 1984) is a Moldovan politician and psychologist. He has served as a member of the Moldovan Parliament since December 2014.
