= Mihail Kendighelean =

Moldovan Gagauz politician

Mihail Kendighelean OR
- Mihail Kendigelän

President of the People's Assembly of Gagauzia
- In office 24 September 1999 – 23 May 2002
- President: Petru Lucinschi; Vladimir Voronin
- Prime Minister: Ion Sturza; Dumitru Braghiș; Vasile Tarlev
- Preceded by: Petru Pașalî
- Succeeded by: Ivan Kristioglo

Chairman of the Supreme Soviet of Gagauzia
- In office 1 December 1991 – 19 June 1995
- Preceded by: Stepan Topal

Personal details
- Born: 4 October 1941 (age 84) Congaz, Kingdom of Romania

Mihail Kendighelean (Gagauz: Mihail Kendigelän; born 4 October 1941) is a Gagauz politician in the Republic of Moldova.

== Biography ==
He was born on October 4, 1941, in Congaz in what is now the Gagauz Autonomous Territorial Unit.

In 1990 he was head of the Gagauz Supreme Soviet and along with President Stepan Topal led the Gagauz areas to achieve their own state formation that declared itself separate from Moldova. Gagauzia was de facto independent from Moldova until 1995. After negotiations it gained regional autonomy. From 1999 to 2002 Kendighelean was Chairman of the People's Assembly of Gagauzia.
