= Stepan Topal =

Moldovan politician (1938–2018)

Stepan Topal OR
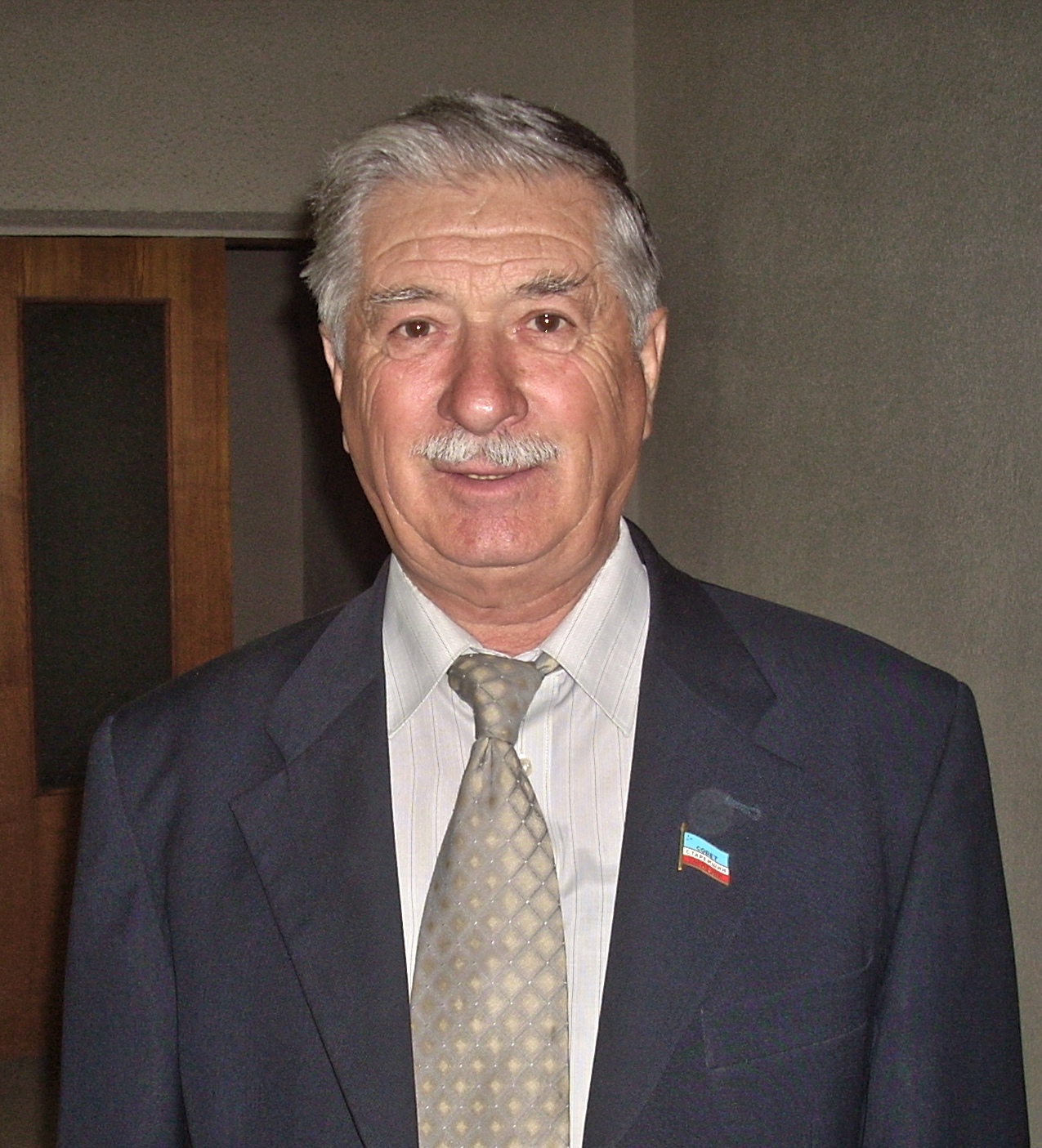
- Topal in 2011

President of the Gagauz Republic
- In office 1 December 1991 – 19 July 1995

Chairman of the Supreme Soviet of the Gagauz Republic
- In office 31 October 1990 – 1 December 1991
- Succeeded by: Mihail Kendighelean

Personal details
- Born: 18 January 1938 Comrat, Kingdom of Romania
- Died: 29 September 2018 (aged 80) Comrat, Moldova
- Party: Communist Party of Moldova (1980-1990); Independent (1990-1995); PSRM (1997-2018)
- Profession: Engineering

Stepan Mikhailovich Topal (18 January 1938 – 29 September 2018) was a Moldovan politician of Gagauz ancestry. From 1990 to 1995 he served as the only leader and President of the Gagauz Republic; after reintegration into Moldova he served until 1995 as Governor (başkan) of Gagauzia.

== Leader of Gagauzia's separatist movement ==
By training, Topal was a road engineer. He was an activist of the Communist Party of Moldova.

Following the declaration of the Gagauz ASSR in Moldova on 12 November 1989, on 19 August 1990, ethnic Gagauz nationalists proclaimed a Soviet autonomous republic in southern Moldova separate from Moldova, around the city of Comrat, and called it the Gagauz Republic (Gagauz-Yeri in their language). It had previously been declared as an ASSR within Moldova on 12 November 1989. In September 1990, individuals representing the mostly Slavic inhabitants of the Dniester River's east bank proclaimed a separate entity in Transnistria with a capital at Tiraspol.

In 1990, Topal became one of the leaders of the national movement in southern Moldova. On 31 October 1990, he was elected president of the Supreme Soviet of the self-proclaimed Gagauz Republic.

Although the Supreme Soviet of the Republic of Moldova immediately declared these proclamations invalid, elections took place in both self-proclaimed republics. On 1 December 1991, Topal was elected president of the Gagauz Republic (90% votes), and from 1991 to 1995 he headed the Supreme Soviet of the Gagauz Republic. That same month, Igor Smirnov was elected president of Transnistria.

Topal supported greater unity among the former Soviet republics.

He also self-declared as an "anti-Romanian".

== Political activity after 1995 ==
Gagauz autonomy was enshrined in the July 1994 Constitution of Moldova, in Article 111, which also provides for Transnistria's autonomy. Later, the Parliament of the Republic of Moldova adopted an even broader law, which confers a special autonomous status on Gagauzia as of 23 December 1994. It entered into force on 14 January 1995.

After Gagauzia's autonomy was accepted by the Moldovan Parliament, the first round of elections for the post of Governor of Gagauzia took place on 25 May 1995, together with elections for the region's Popular Assembly. None of the four candidates for the governorship (Gheorghe Tabunșcic, Mihail Kendighelean, Dumitru Croitor and Stepan Topal) won the votes needed to be elected in the first round. Topal had not even managed to advance to the second round.

From 1999 to 2002, Topal was the principal adviser to başkan Dumitru Croitor. In the 2001 Moldovan parliamentary election, Topal ran for a seat from Comrat on the lists of the Edinstvo electoral bloc, but the alliance won less than the 5% of the vote needed to secure parliamentary seats, so Topal was not elected. In 2002, he was one of the founders of the social-political movement Za Gagauziu! (For Gagauzia), formed in opposition to the ruling Communists.

When snap elections for Governor of Gagauzia were held again on 6 October 2002, Topal ran again. However, the results were declared invalid, as only 41.43% of voters took part. When the election was repeated two weeks later, the local electoral commission barred Topal from running, citing irregularities in his filing papers.

Preceded by –	President of the Supreme Soviet of the Gagauz SSR; 31 October 1990 – 1 December 1991	Succeeded by –
Preceded by –	President of the Republic of Gagauzia; 1 December 1991 – 19 June 1995	Succeeded by Gheorghe Tabunșcic (as Governor)
