= Ana Sözü =

- Editor: Todur Zanet
- Founded: 1988
- Headquarters: Gagauzia
- Website: anasozu.com

Ana Sözü ("Native speech") is the largest local newspaper in Gagauzia (Moldova). It is also the only local newspaper still written entirely in Gagauz, and was the first newspaper of any kind published in the Gagauz language.
