= Realitatea TV (Moldova) =

Moldovan television channel

- Country: Moldova
- Broadcast area: Semi-national
- Headquarters: Chișinău

Ownership
- Owner: HB Media SRL

History
- Launched: 8 July 2014

Links
- Website: www.realitatea.md

Realitatea TV (Romanian pronunciation: [re.aliˈtate̯a teˈve], meaning "The Reality TV") is a Moldovan generalist-informative television channel. The channel is distributed by the cable operators in Moldova, and since May 2015 also broadcasts through analogue terrestrial television in Chișinău and its suburbs.

The station's programming lineup consists of news programs, talk shows, movies, serials, cognitive and entertaining programs, concerts. The editorial staff produces new programs and talk shows, while the movies, serials and the other programs are purchased.

According to the administrator of the TV channel, Dumitru Țîra, this channel has nothing in common with the homonymous Romanian channel Realitatea TV.

On 27 July 2017, in a press release Realitatea TV has announced that since 29 July the TV channel suspends its activity for an indefinite period. Meanwhile, in a press release was stated that the online media group "Realitatea" (www.realitatea.md; www.rlive.md; www.kankan.md; www.bani.md; www.stireata.md; www.topmedia.md) will continue their activity.
