= Gagauz Halkı =

Cultural and political organisation in Moldova

- President: Stepan Bulgar
- Founder: Stepan Bulgar
- Founded: May 1989
- Banned: 22 August 1990
- Ideology: Gagauz nationalism; Gagauz separatism; Gagauz autonomism (initially)

Party flag

Gagauz Halkı (meaning "Gagauz People" in the Gagauz language) was a Gagauz cultural and political organisation in Moldova. It originated as a cultural club in the Gagauz capital Comrat and initially supported the Popular Front of Moldova. However, the Popular Front's shift towards Romanian nationalism and Moldova-Romania unification caused Gagauz Halkı to turn and support Gagauz autonomy within and later separation from the Moldavian Soviet Socialist Republic. Moldovan authorities consequently declared Gagauz Halkı an illegal organisation in 1990. Gagauz Halkı supported the separatist side in the Gagauzia conflict, which was resolved with the intervention of the Soviet Army and the establishment of the Autonomous Territorial Unit of Gagauzia.

== History ==
Gagauz Halkı originated as a Gagauz cultural club in the Gagauz political capital of Comrat, founded amid Moldova's move towards independence (1988–1989). In early May 1989, it was transformed into an umbrella association of Gagauz organisations and people, and one of its representatives attended the founding congress of the Popular Front of Moldova later that month. Gagauz Halkı was initially supportive of the Popular Front, but the Popular Front's shift in focus to Romanian nationalism and proposed Romanian language laws created fears of cultural erasure among the Gagauz populace. Gagauz Halkı consequently made plans to declare the independence of Gagauzia from Moldova, in anticipation of the unification of Moldova and Romania.

The organisation supported the declaration of the Gagauz Autonomous Soviet Socialist Republic within the Moldavian Soviet Socialist Republic in November 1989 and then the declaration of the Gagauz Republic on 19 August 1990. Both declarations were made amid worsening relations between Chisinau and Moscow. Moldovan authorities designated Gagauz Halkı an illegal organisation immediately after the latter declaration, on 22 August, and called on Moldovans to take up arms against separatists in the Gagauzia conflict. The intervention of Soviet soldiers prevented massive bloodshed and the conflict was resolved peacefully with the creation of the Autonomous Territorial Unit of Gagauzia.

Gagauz Halkı supported the 1991 Soviet coup attempt, which sought to prevent the break-up of the Soviet Union.

== Membership and orientation ==
Although it was founded as a general cultural organisation, Gagauz Halkı's membership mostly came from the local district-level administrative elite. Many were content with Soviet governance but receptive to reforms proposed in Chisinau because they wanted to revitalise the historically impoverished Gagauzia. However, for this reason they were also fiercely opposed to the idea of Moldovan independence and unification with Romania.
