= Ferapontievca =

Ferapontievca Parapontika
- Commune
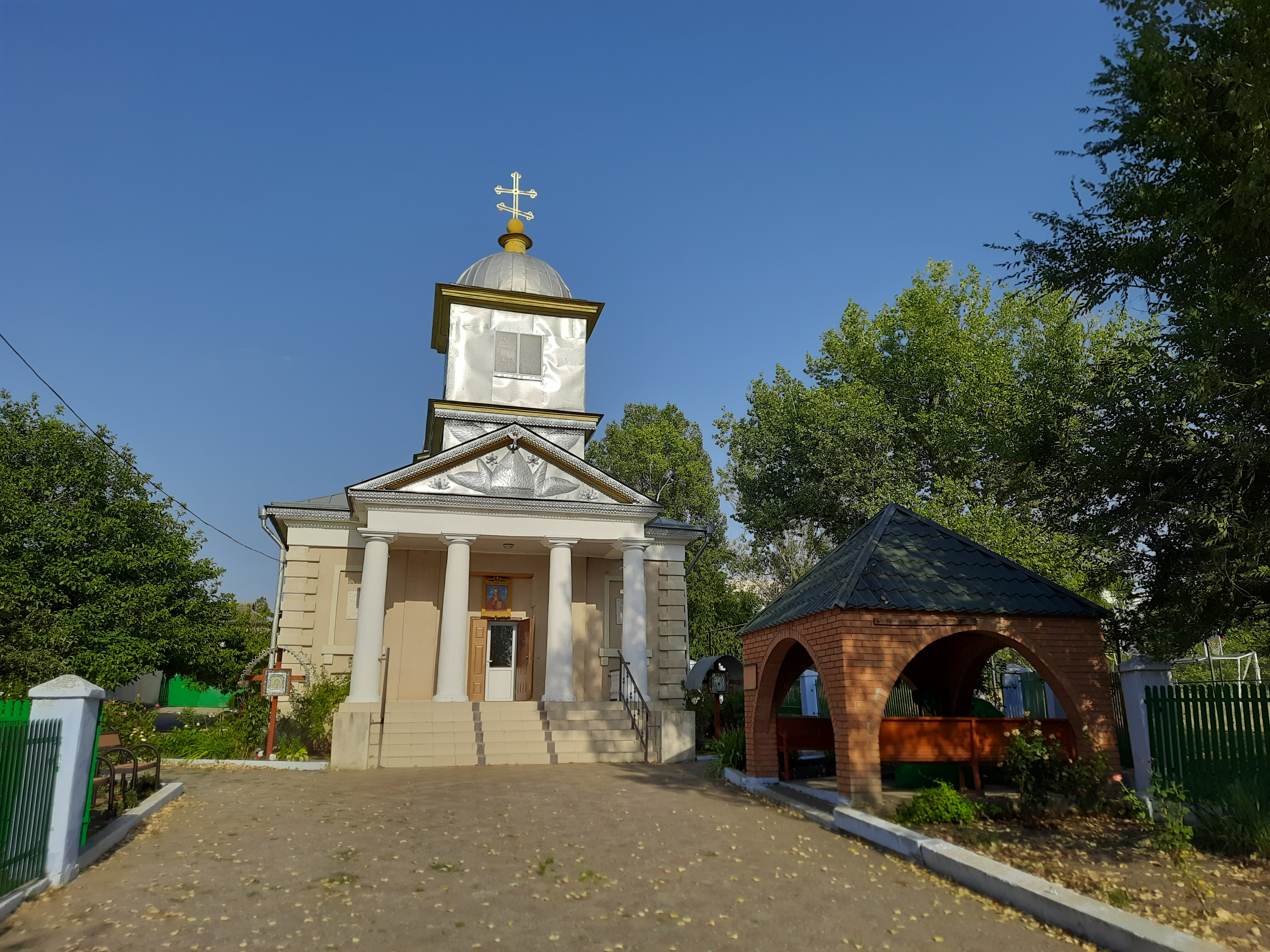
- St. John the Theologian church in Ferapontievca

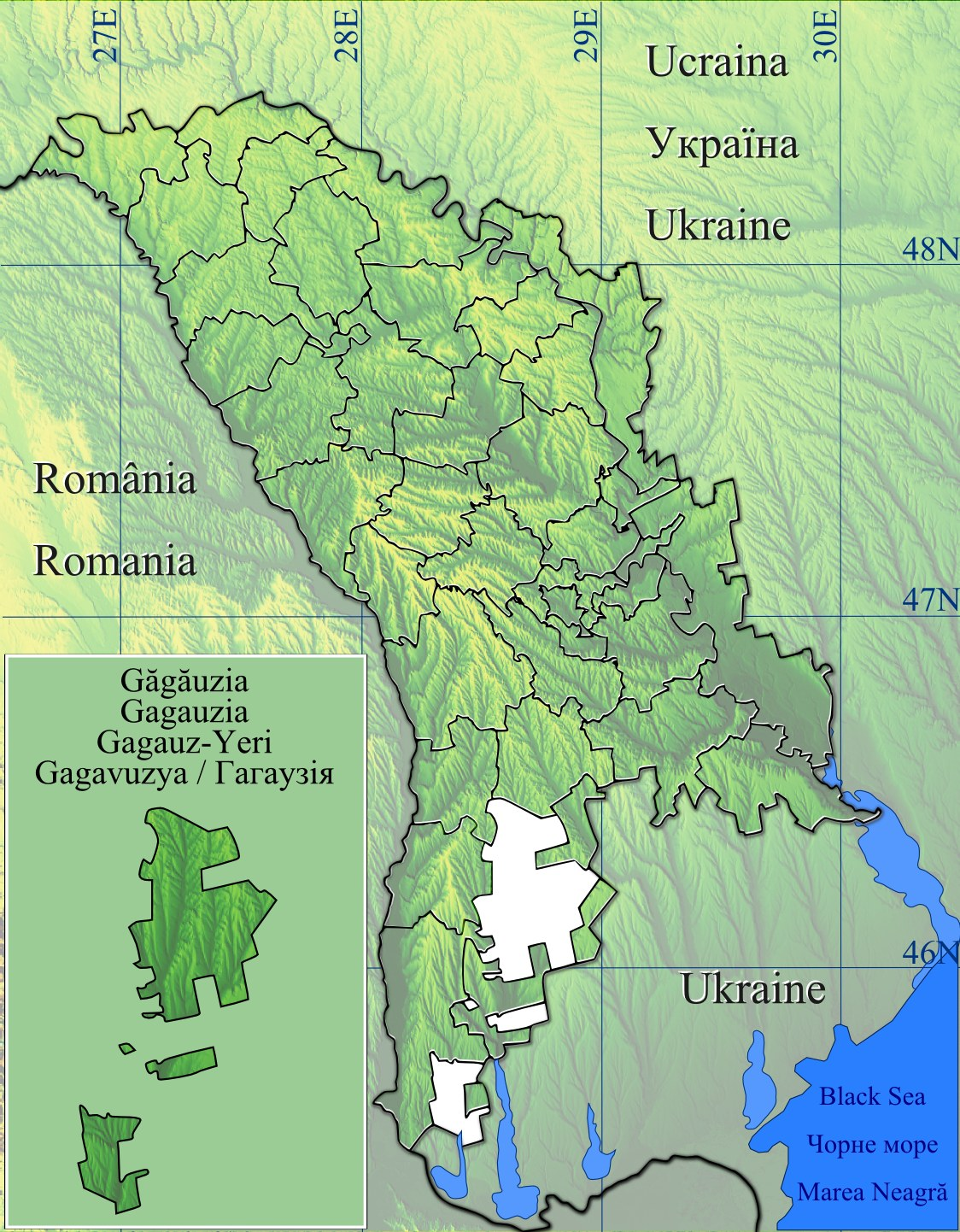
- Location of Ferapontievca in Moldova
- Coordinates: 46°14′24″N 28°46′28″E
- Country: Moldova
- Autonomous Region: Gagauzia
- Founded: 1784

Government
  - Mayor: Yelena Odnostalko

Population (2024)
  - Total: 600

Ethnicity (2024 census)
  - Ukrainians: 43%
  - Gagauz people: 36.50%
  - other: 15.50%
- Time zone: UTC+2 (EET)
- Climate: Cfb

Ferapontievca (Gagauz: Parapontika) is a commune and village in the Comrat district, Gagauz Autonomous Territorial Unit of the Republic of Moldova. According to the 2024 Moldovan census the commune has 600 people, 258 (43%) of them being Ukrainians and 219 (36.50%) being Gagauz.

== History ==
The commune was founded in 1784 and named Ferapontievca, after Saint Ferapont. The commune was settled by Gagauz refugees from the Ottoman empire and Ukrainians from Zaporizhzhia. The latter was led by the Imperial Russian general Ivan Inzov, a plenipotentiary of the Bessarabia Governorate. In 1862, the "St. John the Theologian" church was built.

== Demographics ==
According to the 2024 Moldovan census the commune has 600 people inhabitants, a 25.74% decrease from the previous census in 2014, when 808 inhabitants were registered.

Ethnic composition of Ferapontievca (2024)
Ethnic group	Population	% Percentage
Ukrainians	258	43%
Gagauz	219	36.50%
Moldovans (Note: There is an ongoing controversy regarding the ethnic identification of Moldovans and Romanians.)	36	6%
Russians	31	5.16%
Romani	23	3.83%
Bulgarians	19	3.16%
Others	14	2.33%
Total	600	100%

== International relations ==
=== Twin towns — Sister cities ===
Ferapontievca is twinned with:

- Holubeche, Vinnytsia Oblast, Ukraine;

== Notable people ==
- Vladimir Odnostalco (born 1984), Moldovan politician and psychologist
