= Mihail Ciachir =

- Mihail Çakir
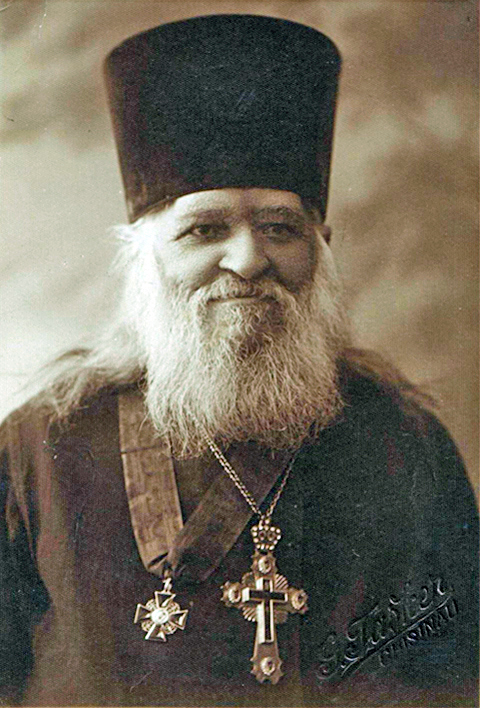
- Ciachir in 1937
- Born: May 9, 1861; Ceadîr-Lunga
- Died: September 8, 1938 (aged 77); Chișinău
- Occupations: priest, ethnographer, grammarian, poet

Mihail Ciachir (also spelled Çakir; 27 April 1861 – 8 September 1938) was a protoiereus and educator in the Gagauz language, and first publisher of Gagauz books in the former Russian Empire.

== Biography ==
Mihail Ciachir was born on April 27, 1861, in the Bessarabian village of Ceadîr-Lunga, in a Gagauz deacon family.

Ciachir studied at the Theological Seminary of Chișinău. After graduation, he taught at a men's theological school. Three years later, he was elected Chairman of the Chișinău School Board.

In 1896, he appealed to the Ministry of Education of the Russian Empire for permission to print books in the Moldovan language. This was granted provided the Moldovan text appeared parallel to the Russian.

From 1901, Ciachir published several books on Moldovan grammar, and tutorials on Russian language and grammar. His textbook to help Moldovans learn Russian went through three editions in fourteen years.

In 1904, Ciachir appealed to the Synod of the Eastern Orthodox Church to permit him to publish religious literature in the Gagauz language. Three years later, he released in Gagauz translation selected passages from the Old Testament, as well as the Gospel of St. Matthew. He was called the Apostle of the printed language by Gagauz contemporaries.

After 1918, when Bessarabia became part of the Kingdom of Romania, Ciachir initiated the transition of Gagauz writing from the previous Cyrillic to the Latin script. In 1924, he joined the leadership of the Alexander Nevsky Brotherhood of the Eastern Orthodox Church to coordinate the struggle against the Romanianisation of Bessarabia.

Ciachir was in touch with Atatürk and presented a copy of his book The History of the Gagauz of Bessarabia to him. Atatürk also provided several Turkish books and teachers to Gagauz people through Ciachir in order to prevent their assimilation.

Ciachir worked for the Romanian magazine Viața Basarabiei between 1933 and 1934. In 1934, he published in the Gagauz language The History of the Gagauz of Bessarabia, and two years later, Wedding Ceremonies of the Gagauz. These two books established his ethnographic credentials.

In 1938, Ciachir published his Gagauz-Romanian dictionary.

Ciachir died in 1938 following a short illness, and was buried in the Chișinău Central Cemetery on Armenian Street.

== Acclaim ==
Although Mihail Ciachir was not a professionally trained researcher, the value of his contributions to history and Gagauz tradition cannot be overestimated. Modern Gagauz researchers depend on his works, and while reinterpreting them, continue to treasure them as a valuable source for investigations carried out in a comparative historical perspective.

Besides the literary and historical impact of Ciachir, his role in defining the Gagauz nationhood is lauded, in particular his spiritual and moral leadership of the Gagauz people. Indeed, for his attempts at a liturgical Gagauz, he is referred to as the Cyril and Methodius of his people, and celebrated throughout the province of Gagauzia today.

The Governor of Gagauzia Mihail Formuzal declared 2011 the Year of Ciachir.

== Works ==
- Bucoavna, 1900
- Rusesc și moldovenesc cuvântelnic, 1907
- Agiutorid moldovenilor în vremea învățăturii limbii rusească, 1911
- Dicționar găgăuzo (turco) român, 1938
