= People's Assembly of Gagauzia =

Legislature of Gagauzia, Moldova

People's Assembly of Gagauzia Gagauziyanin Halk Topluşu (Gagauz) Adunării Populare a Găgăuziei (Romanian) Народное Собрание Гагаузии (Russian)

Type
- Type: Unicameral

Leadership
- Chairman: Valentin Gaidarzhi

Structure
- Seats: 35
- Political groups: Independents (26); BCS (8); PACE (1)

Elections
- Voting system: Two-round system
- Last election: 19 September and 3 October 2021

Meeting place
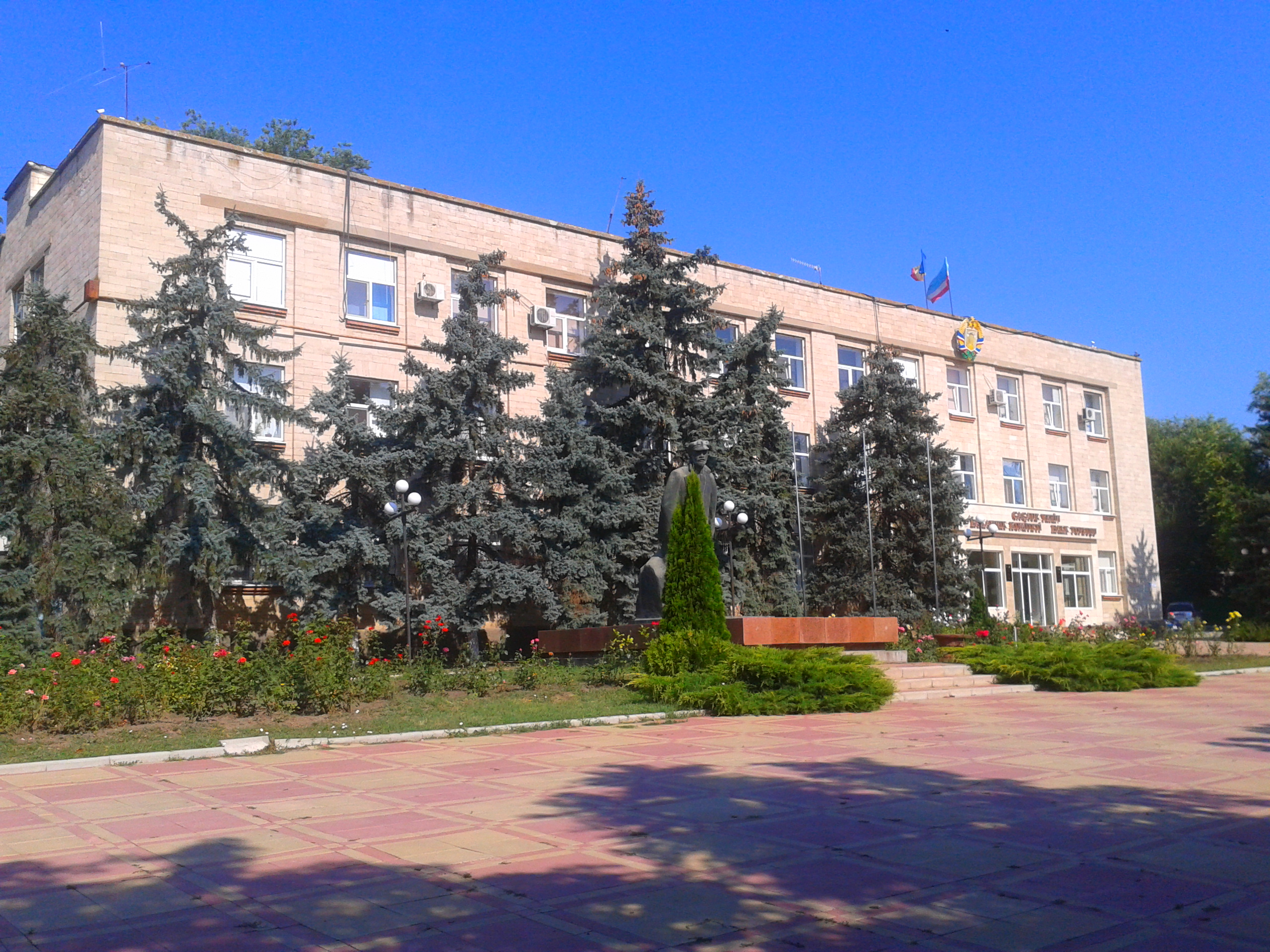
- Gagauz People's Assembly, Comrat, Moldova.

Website
- halktoplushu.md

The People's Assembly of Gagauzia (Gagauz: Gagauziyanin Halk Topluşu, Romanian: Adunării Populare a Găgăuziei, Russian: Народное Собрание Гагаузии) is the representative and legislative body of Gagauzia, an autonomous territorial unit of Moldova.

== Composition ==
The People's Assembly consists of 35 deputies, elected for a term of four years, in single-mandate territorial constituencies, on the basis of universal, equal and direct suffrage with secret and free voting.

=== Members ===
Party	First round			Second round			Total seats
Party	Votes	%	Seats	Votes	%	Seats	Total seats
Bloc of Communists and Socialists	12,371	26.67	6	4,739	18.85	3	9
We Build Europe at Home Party	228	0.49	1				1
Independent	33,778	72.83	11	20,407	81.15	14	25
Total	46,377	100.00	18	25,146	100.00	17	35
Valid votes	46,377	98.33		25,146	98.36		
Invalid/blank votes	786	1.67		419	1.64		
Total votes	47,163	100.00		25,565	100.00		
Registered voters/turnout	116,123	40.61		66,929	38.20		

== Chairmen ==
The work of the National Assembly is headed by the President of the People's Assembly of Gagauzia and the Presidium of the People's Assembly. Below is a list of office-holders:

Name	Entered office	Left office
Petru Pașalî	October 1995	1999
Mihail Kendighelean	24 September 1999	23 May 2002
Ivan Kristioglo	23 May 2002	20 December 2003
Stepan Esir	20 December 2003	16 March 2008
Ana Harlamenco	31 July 2008	5 November 2012
Dmitri Constantinov	5 November 2012	20 January 2017
Alexandr Tarnavski	20 January 2017	20 February 2017
Vladimir Cîssa	3 March 2017	4 February 2022
Dmitri Constantinov	4 February 2022	27 November 2025
Nicolai Ormanji	27 November 2025	3 July 2026
Valentin Gaidarzhi	3 July 2026	
