= Ceadîr-Lunga =

Ceadîr-Lunga Çadır-Lunga
- Municipality
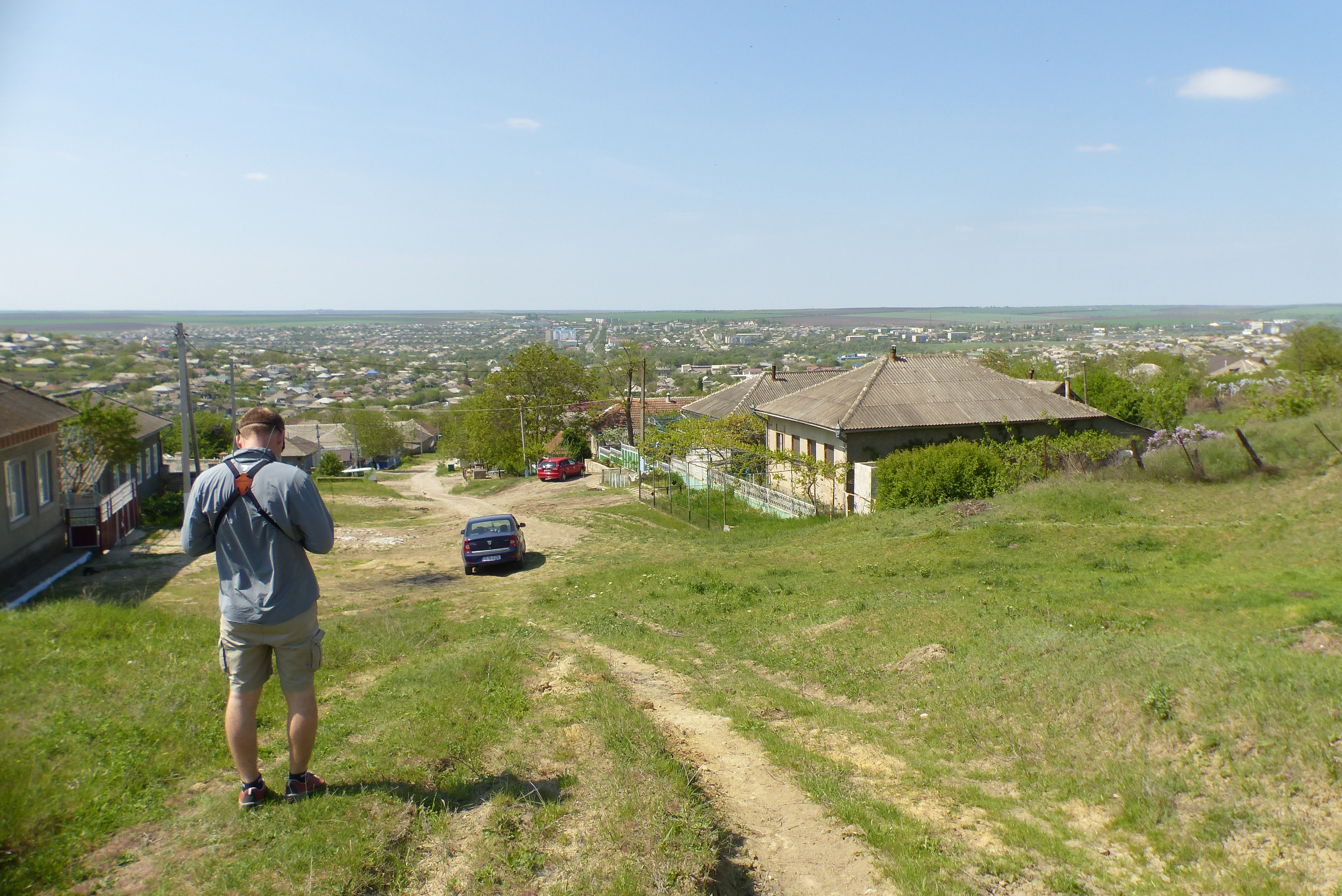
- Skyline of Ceadîr-Lunga

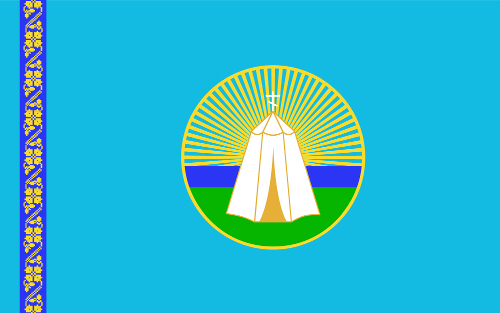
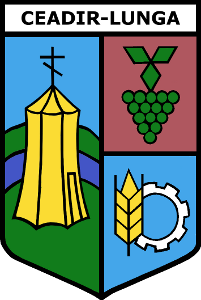
- Flag Coat of arms
- Interactive map of Ceadîr-Lunga
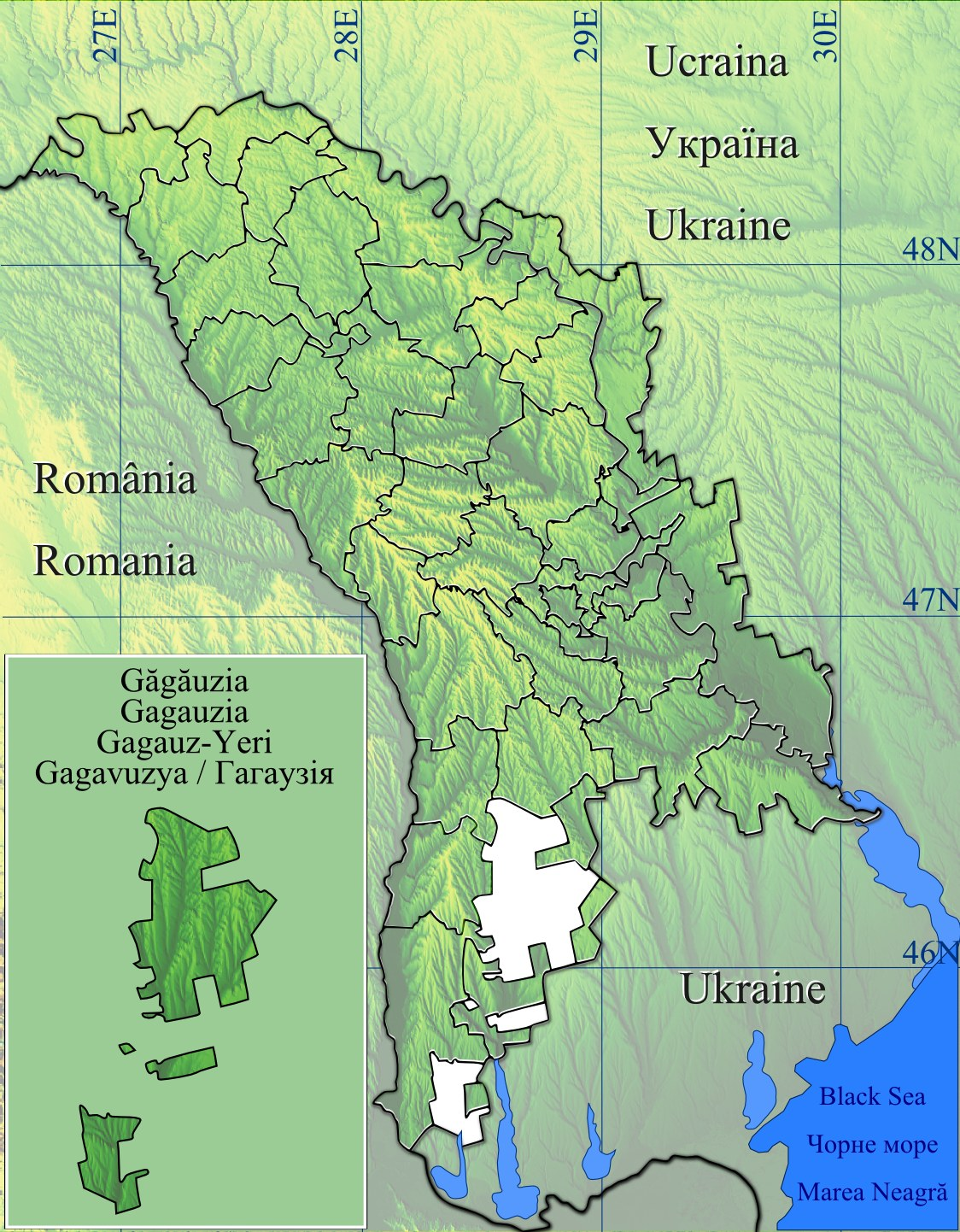
- Location of Ceadîr-Lunga in Moldova Ceadîr-Lunga (Moldova)
- Coordinates: 46°03′N 28°50′E
- Country: Moldova
- District: Gagauzia
- Founded: 1812

Government
  - Mayor: Anatoly Topal

Area
  - Total: 9.61 km^{2} (3.71 sq mi)

Population (2024)
  - Total: 14,285
  - Density: 1,490/km^{2} (3,850/sq mi)

Ethnicity (2024 census)
  - Gagauz people: 77.7%
  - Bulgarians: 7.5%
  - other: 14.8%
- Time zone: UTC+2 (EET)
  - Summer (DST): UTC+3 (EEST)
- Climate: Cfb
- Website: ceadir-lunga.md

Ceadîr-Lunga (Romanian pronunciation: [t͡ʃaˈdɨr ˈluŋɡa], also spelled Ceadâr-Lunga; Gagauz: Çadır-Lunga) is a city and district in Gagauz Autonomous Territorial Unit of the Republic of Moldova. It is the second biggest city in Gagauzia with a population of 14,285.

== History ==
The area in where Ceadîr-Lunga is located was once a settlement called Aran-Yurt, belonging to the Budjak Horde, populated by Nogai-Tatars until its conquest by the Russian Empire in 1806. After which the Nogais were expelled to Taurida Governorate and the North Caucasus, with many also fleeing to the Ottoman Empire.

By local accounts the settlement was founded around 1812, by migrants from Ceadîr in Cahul County who settled the Lunga valley, thus its name Ceadîr-Lunga. Settlers from Dobruja, Fălciu County, Muntenia and Vaslui County also followed. Gradually Gagauz and Bulgarian refugees from the Ottoman Empire became the dominant group in the then village, with the Romanian minority adopting the Gagauz language. The priest Zacharias Chakir opened the first Bulgarian school in Bessarabia in 1819.

In 1827 the village was said to have 150 households in total, 135 of whom were Bulgarians, with the others households like 10 Moldovan, 2 "Gypsy", 1 "Little Russian" and 1 "Arnaut" being counted, the remainder being clergy and mazils.

The first church in the village was built in 1818, which lasted until 1867. On the same year Church of St. Athanasius was built in its stead. To supplement the growth of the village another church was built in 1911, named St. Dumitru church. A sizable Lipovan minority was also founded in the mid 19th century. Early 20th century saw the coalescing of a small Jewish community, with around 24 business being run by Jews in 1924 and 524 Jewish inhabitants in the village (7.11%) by 1930.

In 1957 when Gagauz was formally established as an official written language in the Soviet Union, it was developed on the basis of the Comrat and Ceadîr-Lunga dialect of the vernacular.

On June 9, 1958, by decree of the Presidium of the Supreme Council of the Moldavian SSR, Ceadîr-Lunga was given the status of city.

== Demographics ==
According to the 2024 census, 14,285 inhabitants lived in Ceadîr-Lunga, a decrease compared to the previous census in 2014, when 16,605 inhabitants were registered.

Ethnic composition of Ceadîr-Lunga (2024)
Ethnic group	Population	% Percentage
Gagauz	11,095	77.66%
Bulgarians	1,075	7.52%
Russians	796	5.57%
Moldovans (Note: There is an ongoing controversy regarding the ethnic identification of Moldovans and Romanians.)	606	4.24%
Ukrainians	477	3.33%
Romani	91	0.64%
Others	145	1.04%
Total	14,285	100%

Historical population
Year	Pop.	±%
1930	7,365	—
1943	8,200	+11.3%
1959	13,193	+60.9%
1970	20,474	+55.2%
1979	21,949	+7.2%
1989	23,161	+5.5%
2004	19,401	−16.2%
2014	16,605	−14.4%
2024	14,285	−14.0%

== Climate ==
Climate data for Ceadîr-Lunga (1991–2020, extremes 1956–1964 and 1974–present)
Month	Jan	Feb	Mar	Apr	May	Jun	Jul	Aug	Sep	Oct	Nov	Dec	Year
Record high °C (°F)	18.1 (64.6)	21.9 (71.4)	25.7 (78.3)	30.4 (86.7)	35.1 (95.2)	38.2 (100.8)	39.8 (103.6)	40.2 (104.4)	37.0 (98.6)	32.5 (90.5)	24.7 (76.5)	18.9 (66.0)	40.2 (104.4)
Mean daily maximum °C (°F)	1.6 (34.9)	4.2 (39.6)	9.9 (49.8)	16.7 (62.1)	22.7 (72.9)	26.7 (80.1)	29.2 (84.6)	29.2 (84.6)	23.4 (74.1)	15.9 (60.6)	9.3 (48.7)	3.4 (38.1)	16.0 (60.8)
Daily mean °C (°F)	−1.8 (28.8)	0.0 (32.0)	4.5 (40.1)	10.5 (50.9)	16.4 (61.5)	20.5 (68.9)	22.8 (73.0)	22.6 (72.7)	17.1 (62.8)	11.1 (52.0)	5.2 (41.4)	0.0 (32.0)	10.7 (51.3)
Mean daily minimum °C (°F)	−4.7 (23.5)	−3.4 (25.9)	0.1 (32.2)	5.2 (41.4)	10.7 (51.3)	14.8 (58.6)	16.9 (62.4)	16.6 (61.9)	11.7 (53.1)	6.9 (44.4)	2.0 (35.6)	−2.9 (26.8)	6.2 (43.2)
Record low °C (°F)	−25.9 (−14.6)	−23.8 (−10.8)	−17.0 (1.4)	−7.6 (18.3)	−2.1 (28.2)	5.0 (41.0)	8.3 (46.9)	6.7 (44.1)	−2.6 (27.3)	−8.6 (16.5)	−13.7 (7.3)	−22.2 (−8.0)	−25.9 (−14.6)
Average precipitation mm (inches)	26 (1.0)	22 (0.9)	27 (1.1)	32 (1.3)	46 (1.8)	69 (2.7)	53 (2.1)	46 (1.8)	42 (1.7)	40 (1.6)	35 (1.4)	32 (1.3)	469 (18.5)
Average precipitation days (≥ 1.0 mm)	5	5	6	5	7	8	6	4	5	5	4	5	65
Average relative humidity (%)	86	83	78	71	67	68	66	65	70	76	85	87	75
Source 1: NOAA
Source 2: Serviciul Hidrometeorologic de Stat (extremes, relative humidity)

== Sport ==
The city is represented by FC Saxan Gagauz Yeri in Moldovan Liga 2, the third tier of Moldovan football. The club play their matches in Ceadîr-Lunga Stadium.

== International relations ==
=== Twin towns – Sister cities ===
Ceadîr-Lunga is twinned with:

- Dobrush, Belarus;
- Salihorsk, Belarus;
- Bursa, Turkey
- Rechytsa, Belarus;
- Kavarna, Bulgaria;
- Techirghiol, Romania;
- Serpukhov, Russia;
- Pravets, Bulgaria;
- Siverskodonetsk, Ukraine;
- İzmit, Turkey
- Bolgrad, Ukraine;
- Comrat, Moldova;
- Navlinsky District, Russia;
- Tighina, Moldova; (Note: Transnistria's political status is disputed. It considers itself to be an independent state, but this is not recognised by any UN member state. The Moldovan government and the international community consider Transnistria a part of Moldova's territory.)
- (Israel) Ariel, West Bank;
- Kostroma, Russia;
- Nurlat, Tatarstan, Russia;
- Vylkove, Ukraine;
- Târgu Ocna, Romania;

== Notable people ==
- Yefim Chulak (born 1948), a Russian former volleyball player
- Mihail Ciachir (1861 in Ceadîr-Lunga - 1938 in Chișinău) was a Gagauz protoiereus who was the first published of Gagauz books in the former Russian Empire
- Dumitru Croitor (born 1959), Moldovan politician
- Nina Karpachova (born 1957), Ukrainian lawyer and politician
- Marina Radiş (born 1982), Gagauz singer
- Ludmila Tukan (born 1982), Gagauz singer and Turkvision Song Contestant

== Gallery ==
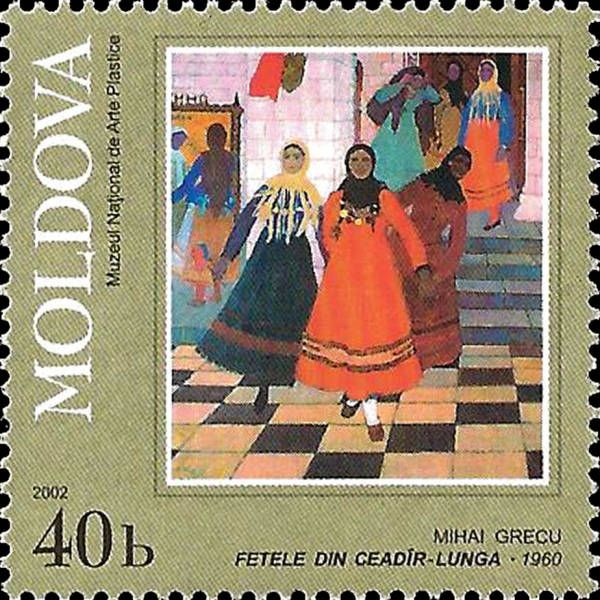
Girls from Ceadîr-Lunga (1960). Mihai Grecu.

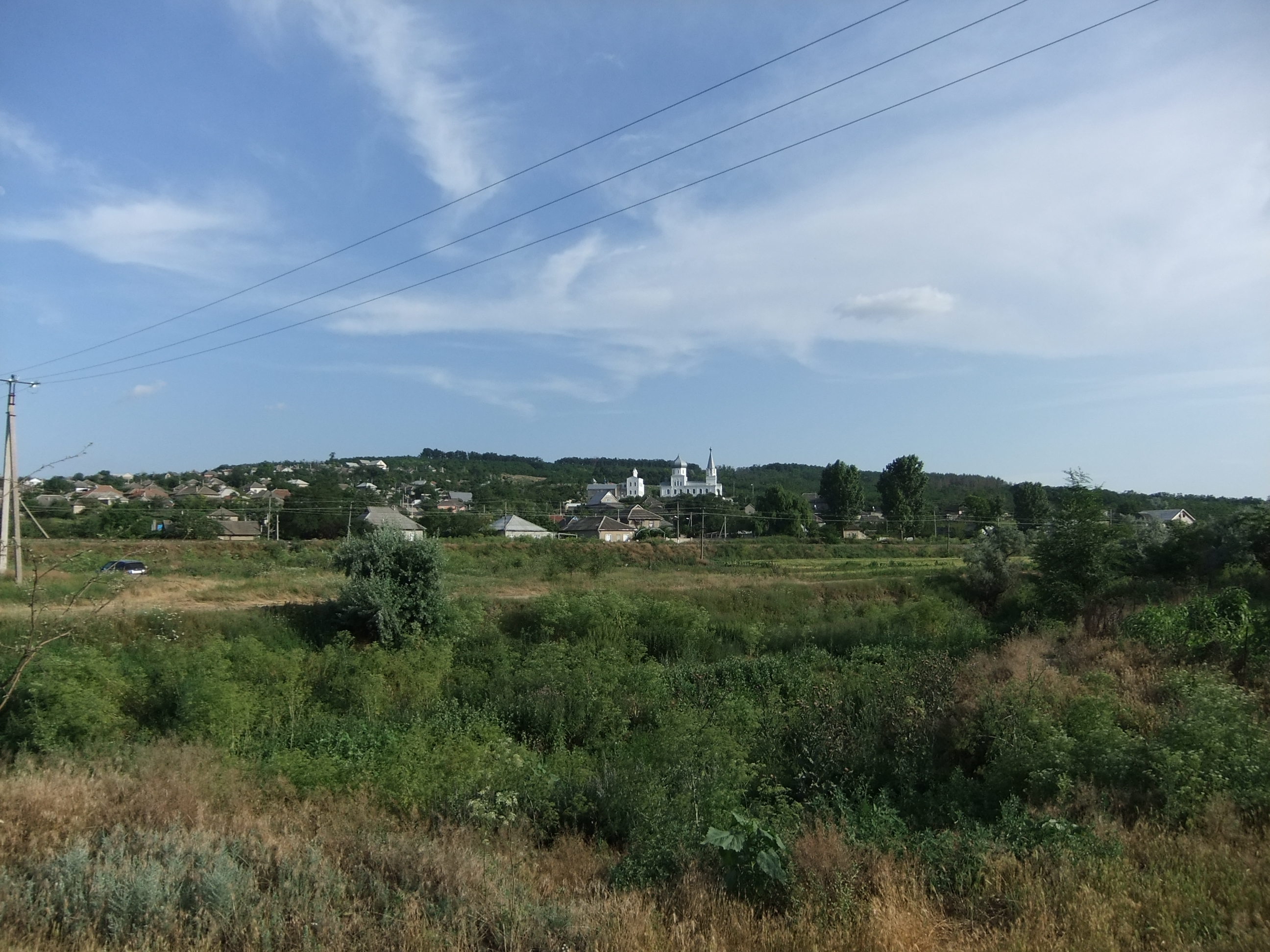
Ceadîr-Lunga, women Monastery

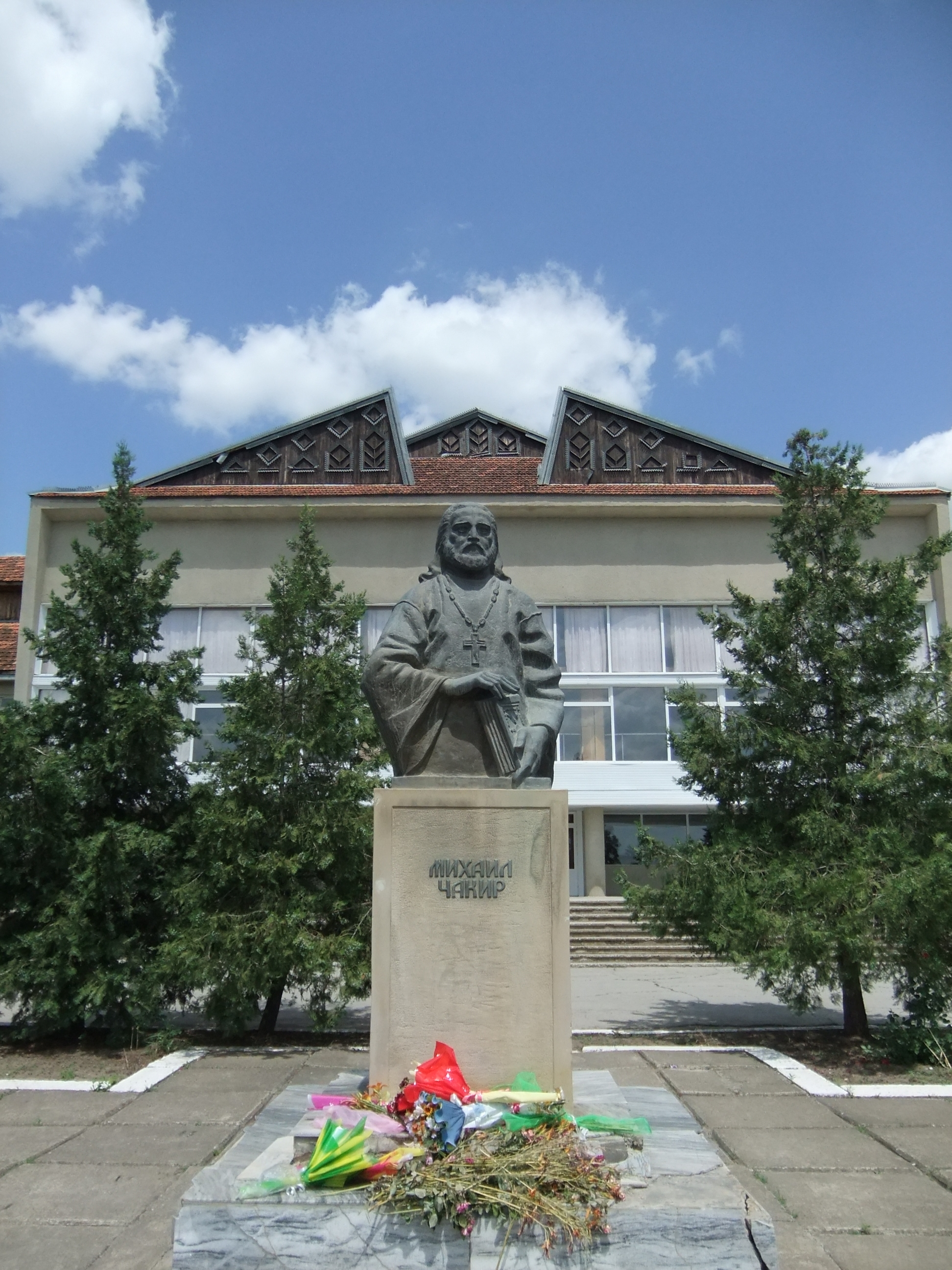
House of Culture and monument of Mihail Ciachir

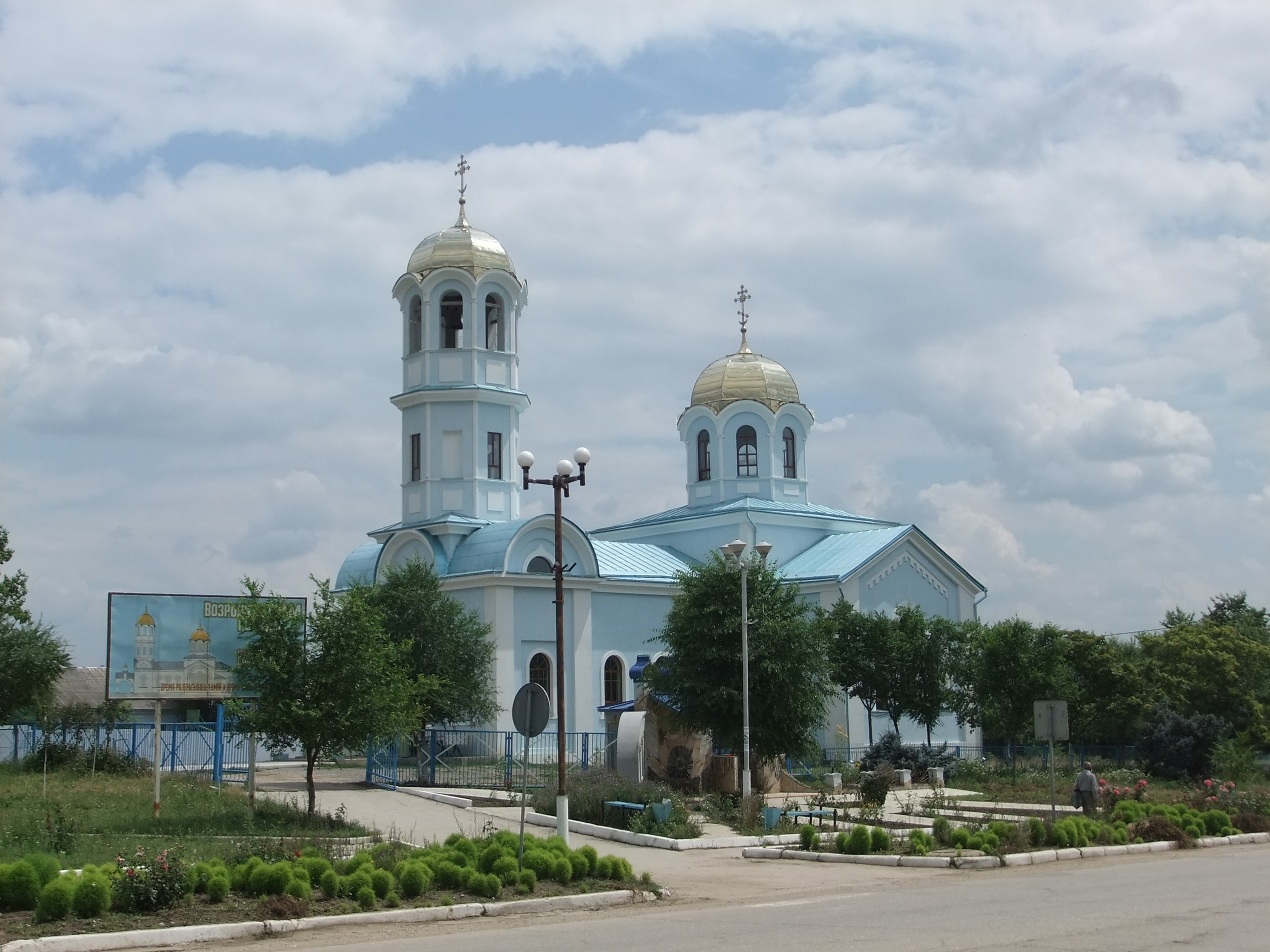
Church of Our Lady of Kazan
