= 2023 Gagauz gubernatorial election =

- 30 April 2023 (first round); 14 May 2023 (second round)
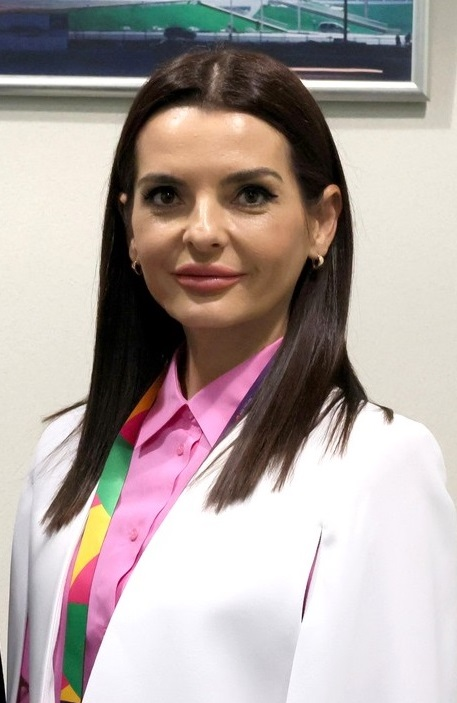

Candidate	Evghenia Guțul	Grigorii Uzun
Party	ȘOR	Independent
Alliance		PSRM
Popular vote	27,374	24,926
Percentage	52.34%	47.66%
- Results for the first round (left) and the second round (right)
Başkan before election
Irina Vlah
Independent
Elected Başkan
Evghenia Guțul
ȘOR

The 2023 Gagauz gubernatorial election was held on 30 April and 14 May 2023 on the territory of the Autonomous Territorial Unit of Gagauzia, part of the Republic of Moldova. The position of Governor (Başkan) of Gagauzia represents one of the highest positions in the autonomy, also having the position of a member of the Government of the Republic of Moldova ex officio.

The election was marred by heavy irregularities, including alleged Russian-influenced vote buying, illegal financing, corruption, bribing and organized voter transport, all of which the Moldovan government failed to prevent. Evghenia Guțul, an affiliate of the Moldovan pro-Russian fugitive oligarch Ilan Shor, won the election as a Șor Party candidate and became governor of Gagauzia. She would later become a suspect in a case of illegal financing related to the 2023 election campaign in the region and received a seven-year prison sentence two years later over a different case of illegal financing.

== Background ==
Gagauzia's autonomy is guaranteed by the Constitution of the Republic of Moldova and regulated by the Gagauz Autonomy Act of 1994. Irina Vlah was elected on 22 March 2015 as the Başkan of Gagauzia and won her second mandate in 2019. She is no longer eligible for a third term.

Gagauzia is an autonomous region under the constitutional control of the Chișinău authorities

Following the statements by which Irina Vlah admitted that the official language of the Republic of Moldova is Romanian, PSRM leader Igor Dodon announced that the socialists are withdrawing their support for the governor of Gagauzia. Irina Vlah is an ex-officio member of the government of the Republic of Moldova throughout her mandate, being a member of the cabinets of Chiril Gaburici (2015), Valeriu Streleț (2015–2016), Pavel Filip (2016–2019), Maia Sandu (2019), Ion Chicu (2019–2021), Natalia Gavrilița (2021–2023) and Dorin Recean (2023–present).

== Candidates ==
In the 2023 election, eight candidates registered, including one party member and seven independent candidates.

Romanian news sites HotNews and România Liberă referred to all candidates in the election as being pro-Russian. The Bulgarian-Romanian Observatory of Digital Media stated that the electoral campaign was saturated by disinformation, rhetoric against the Moldovan government and anti-Romanian and anti-Western narratives.

Candidate	Political party	Positions held	Endorsed by	Ref.
Nicolai Dudoglo	Independent	Member of the Moldovan Parliament (2014–2018); Mayor of Comrat (2004–2014)		
Grigorii Uzun	Independent	Member of the Moldovan Parliament (2021)	Party of Socialists of the Republic of Moldova (PSRM); Igor Dodon, 5th President of Moldova (2016–2020)	
Mihail Formuzal	Independent	Governor of Gagauzia (2006–2015)	Victor Petrioglu, PN mayor of Vulcănești	
Victor Petrov	Independent	Member of the People's Assembly of Gagauzia (since 2021)	Vasile Bolea, Member of the Moldovan Parliament for BCS	
Dumitru Croitor	Independent	Ambassador to Turkey, Lebanon, Egypt and Jordan (since 2019); Governor of Gagauzia (1999–2002)		
Serghei Cernev	Independent	Member of the People's Assembly of Gagauzia		
Evghenia Guțul	Șor Party	No previous offices	Șor Party	
Serghei Cimpoieș	Independent	Member of the People's Assembly of Gagauzia (since 2021)		

== Opinion polls ==
Dates conducted	Polling firm	Sample size	Petrov Ind.	Guțul ȘOR	Uzun Ind.	Dudoglo Ind.	Formuzal Ind.	Croitor Ind.	Cimpoieș Ind.	Cernev Ind.	Lead
14 May 2023 (2nd round)	CEC	–	–	52.3	47.7	–					4.6
30 Apr 2023 (1st round)	CEC	–	16.2	26.5	26.4	9.0	3.5	10.4	5.7	2.3	0.1
30 Apr 2023	Intellect Group-SPERO	984	22	16	24	8	6	16	2	1	2
18–23 Apr 2023	iData	1,023	12.7	18.3	20.5	11.1	10.4	15.2	8.3	3.5	2.2
12–20 Apr 2023	Başkan Elections 2023	2,060	46	18	14	7	5	4	4	2	28
28 Mar – 3 Apr 2023	Başkan Elections 2023	1,050	55	—N/a	16	11	10	6	—N/a	2	39

== Results ==
Candidate	Party	First round		Second round	
Candidate	Party	Votes	%	Votes	%
Evghenia Guțul	Șor Party	14,890	26.47	27,374	52.34
Grigorii Uzun	Independent	14,849	26.40	24,926	47.66
Victor Petrov	Independent	9,133	16.24		
Dumitru Croitor	Independent	5,825	10.35		
Nicolai Dudoglo	Independent	5,059	8.99		
Serghei Cimpoieș	Independent	3,228	5.74		
Mihail Formuzal	Independent	1,969	3.50		
Serghei Cernev	Independent	1,301	2.31		
Total		56,254	100.00	52,300	100.00
Valid votes		56,254	98.51	52,300	97.44
Invalid/blank votes		853	1.49	1,376	2.56
Total votes		57,107	100.00	53,676	100.00
Registered voters/turnout		92,563	61.70	92,558	57.99
Source: Central Electoral Commission – First round, Data, Second round, Data

== Irregularities and alleged Russian interference ==
The election was manipulated by vote buying influenced by Russia that led to the victory of Guțul as the German Marshall Fund (GMF) described. The pan-European think tank European Council on Foreign Relations (ECFR) stated that Russia spent four million euros to buy 27,000 votes during the election, which helped secure Guțul's victory, who the ECFR noted was an affiliate of Moldovan pro-Russian fugitive oligarch Ilan Shor. Shor had been put under sanctions from the United States in 2022 over his involvement in Russian electoral interference in Moldova. The election saw an unprecedented level of illegal campaign financing, with Guțul's rise to power being compromised by irregularities such as electoral fraud allegations, vote buying and corruption which national law enforcement failed to counter. A particularly controversial tactic was the bribing of pensioners through financial supplements. Organized transport for voters in buses also took place.

Political analyst and researcher Laurențiu Pleșca stated for the GMF that Shor's network demonstrated its capacity to influence electoral outcomes through vote buying and media control in the 2023 Gagauz election. Researcher Jamie Bergin stated for the Chr. Michelsen Institute that the Russian government had in recent years concentrated its geopolitical interests on Gagauzia and supporting the Șor Party there, the region being one of the party's strongest bases at the time. In an interview for Civicus Lens, Moldovan human rights NGO Promo-LEX's director Ion Manole stated, commenting on the 2024 presidential election and EU membership constitutional referendum in Moldova, that Russia started testing new political tactics in the country with the 2023 election in Gagauzia, later leading to the Russian interference in both 2024 votes.

On 13 May, a day before the election's second round, the Central Electoral Commission (CEC) of Moldova opened proceedings against all eight candidates of the previous round, as they all had received donations that surpassed the legal maximum of 11,700 lei, with Guțul having received the largest amount of money exceeding the legal limit by a combined 458,000 lei coming from 65 donations, followed by Petrov with a total of 436,800 lei from 21 donations.

Following the election, Moldova's National Anti-Corruption Center (CNA) initiated a criminal case into "corrupting voters and violating the way of managing the financial means of political parties or electoral funds". Later, on 25 March 2025, Guțul was handcuffed and detained for 72 hours at the Chișinău International Airport, right as she intended to flee Moldova. This was due to a criminal case under investigation in which she was a suspect over illegal financing amounting to 370,000 Moldovan lei for the 2023 election campaign in Gagauzia. This was one of two criminal cases she was involved in when she received a seven-year sentence on 5 August that year over a different case of illegal financing.

On 22 May 2023, the Comrat Court of Appeal recognized the results of the election and Guțul's victory. This was despite the CNA and the CEC having questioned the integrity of the electoral process. In early May, the CEC had provided Gagauzia's regional electoral commission documents alleging violations of electoral legislation, with most of them having been ignored by the Gagauz authorities as Polish Centre for Eastern Studies political analyst Kamil Całus described. The day after the election, the CEC also reported at least eight law violations on campaign financing. As a result, CNA agents entered the premises of the Gagauz electoral commission on 16 May, seizing the voter lists. This was part of an investigation that had begun in late April regarding vote buying and the illegal financing of one of the election's candidates by an "organized criminal group", which Całus argued clearly referred to affiliates of Shor.

== Aftermath ==
On 19 July, Guțul was appointed as governor by the People's Assembly, Gagauzia's regional parliament, with no representative figure of the central government being present at the inauguration. President of Moldova Maia Sandu kept delaying signing the decree that would have included Guțul into the government's composition despite being obliged to do so under a 1994 law, as she invoked suspicions regarding the affiliation of Guțul with a criminal group or actions from her in the interest of another country. Guțul was later sentenced to seven years in prison over illegal financing on 5 August 2025.

Following the election, the Șor Party strengthened control over Gagauzia Radio Television (GRT), the autonomous region's public broadcaster, as well as online platforms, leading to widespread censorship, disinformation and the omission of several critical issues during coverage. The party was later banned in June 2023 by the Constitutional Court of Moldova amid numerous allegations of electoral corruption and peddling Russian foreign influence, including during the 2023 Gagauz election.
