= Executive Committee of Gagauzia =

Executive branch of Gagauzia

- Gagauz: Gagauz Yerin Bakannık Komiteti; Romanian: Comitetul Executiv al UTA Găgăuzia; Russian: Исполнительный комитет Гагаузии
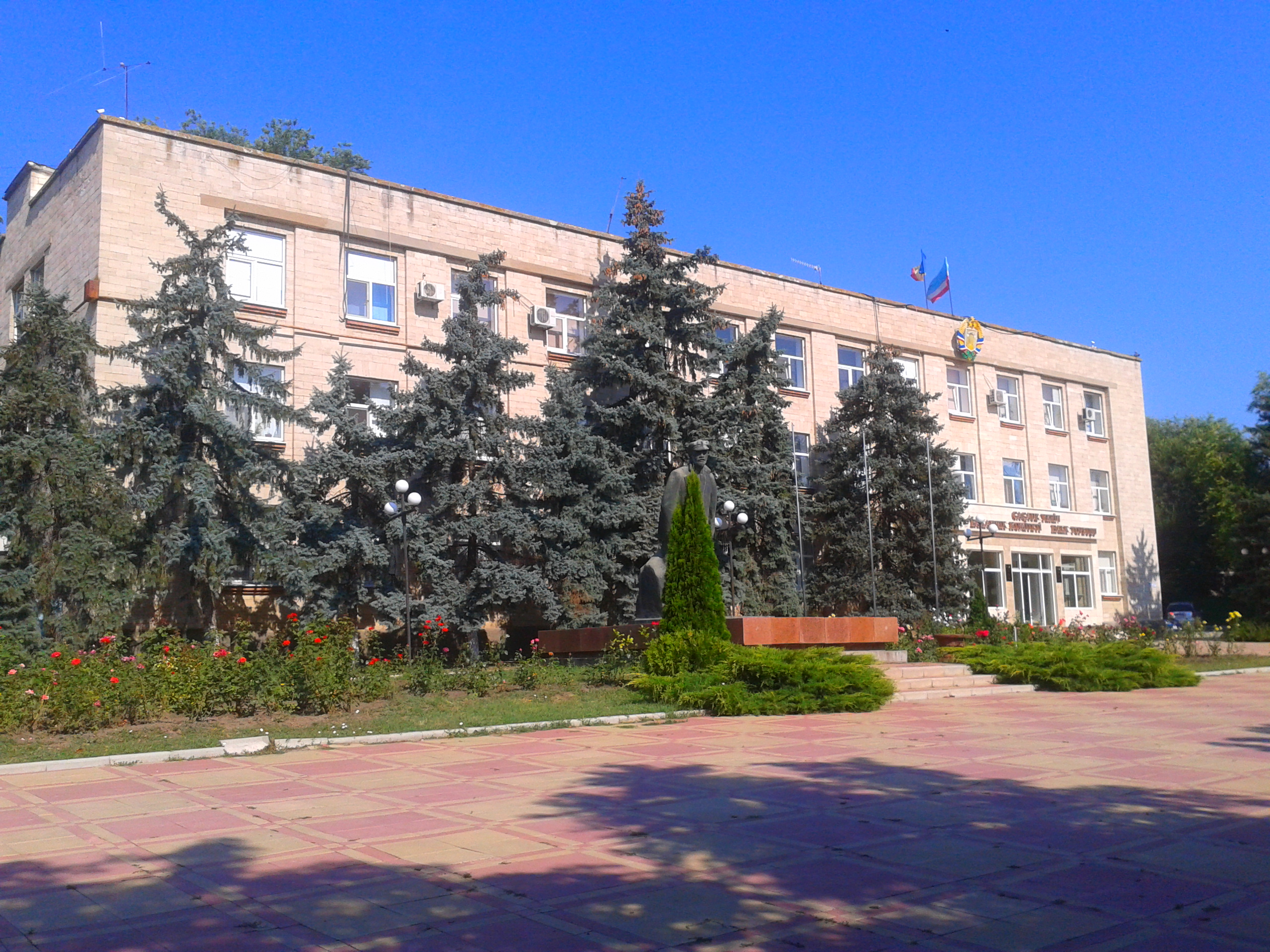
- Headquarters of the Executive Committee

Overview
- State: Moldova; Gagauzia
- Leader: Governor of Gagauzia
- Appointed by: Governor
- Responsible to: People's Assembly of Gagauzia
- Headquarters: 196 Lenin Street, Comrat, Gagauzia, Republic of Moldova
- Website: gagauzia.md

The Executive Committee of Gagauzia (Gagauz: Gagauz Yerin Bakannık Komiteti; Romanian: Comitetul Executiv al UTA Găgăuzia; Russian: Исполнительный комитет Гагаузии) is the chief executive body of Gagauzia, a territorial autonomous unit within the Republic of Moldova. It comprises a diverse array of officials responsible for governing various administrative and strategic departments. By law, the Committee is elected by the People's Assembly of Gagauzia in its first sitting after the elections, following the proposals of the Başkan. In case the Başkan is unable to fulfill its duties or the post becomes vacant, the first vice president of the Executive Committee takes over its duties. The Committee has the right to initiate legislation in the People's Assembly. Unusually, after the 2023 elections, the Executive Committee could only be voted in the People's Assembly's ninth sitting, on the seventh attempt. One of the main points of the Assembly's opposition was that seven of the originally proposed members were unable to speak Gagauz.

== Structure ==
The structure of the Executive Committee as voted on September 20, 2023 is as follows:

| Position | Name |
|---|---|
| President of the Executive Committee – Governor of Gagauzia | Evghenia Guțul |
| First Vice-president of the Executive Committee | Ilia Uzun |
| Vice-president of the Executive Committee | Victor Petrov |
| Head of the General Department of Affairs of the Başkan and the Executive Committee | Pavel Tulba |
| Head of the General Department of Economic Development and Tourism | Larisa Cerven |
| Head of the General Department of Finance | Ana Peev |
| Head of the General Department of External Relations | Anastasia Ciolac |
| General Department of the Agro-Industrial Complex | Sergey Ibrishim |
| Head of the General Department of Health and Social Protection | Edgar Dimov |
| Head of the General Department of Education | Natalia Cristeva |
| Head of the General Department of Youth Affairs and Sports | Veaceslav Dragoi |
| Head of the General Department of Culture | Marina Semyonova |
| Head of the General Department of Fiscal Administration | Ivanna Avramova |
| Head of the General Construction and Infrastructure Department | vacant (as of September 2023) |
| Head of the General Internal Affairs Department | vacant (as of September 2023) |
| Head of the Information and Security Service Department | vacant (as of September 2023) |
| President of the Comrat District | Vadim Ceban |
| President of Ciadîr-Lunga District | Natalia Shosheva |
| President of Vulcănești District | Pyotr Ceban |

== See also ==
- List of prime ministers of Moldova
- Politics of Moldova
- Government of Moldova
