= Grigorii Uzun =

Moldovan businessman and politician

Grigorii Uzun MP
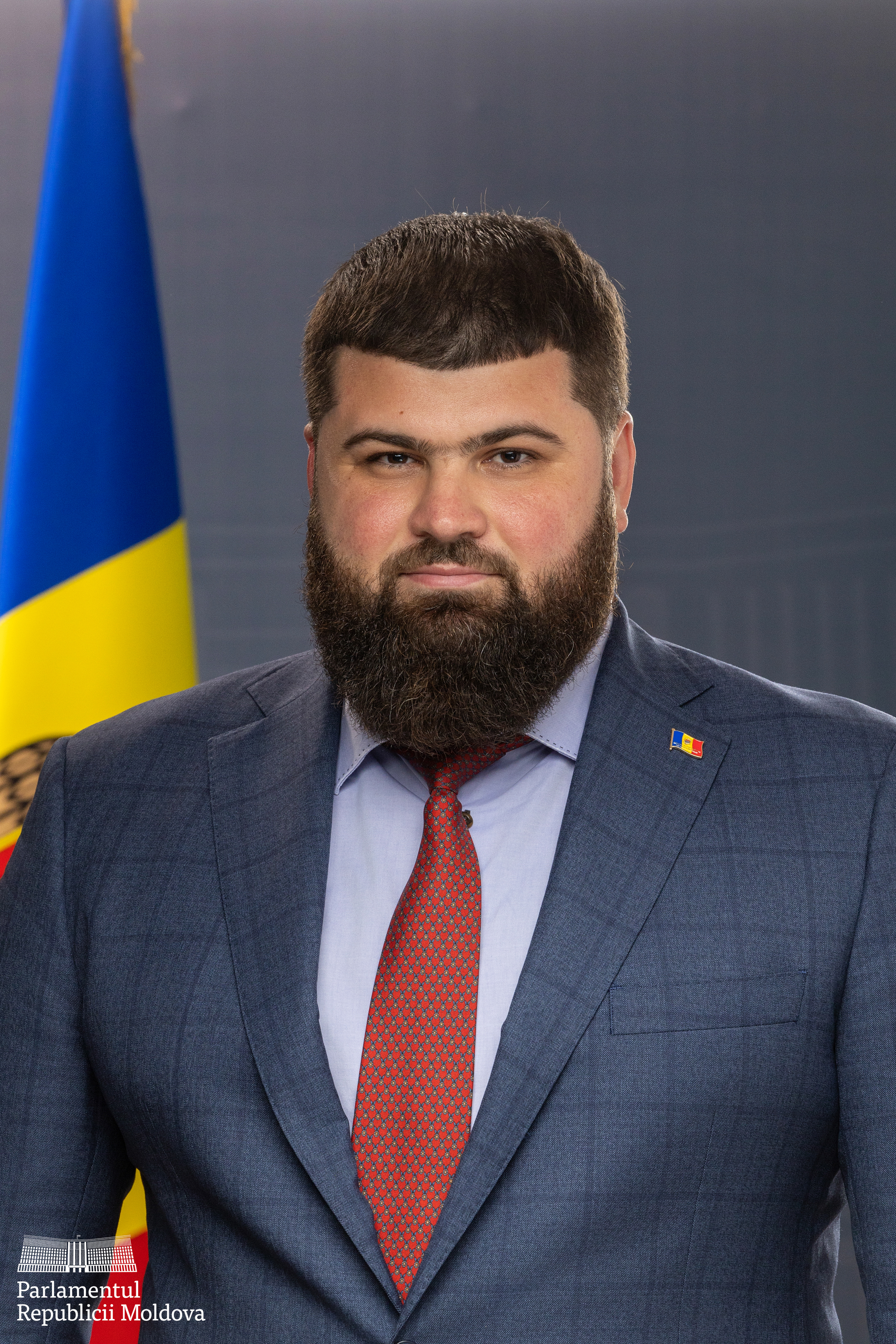
- Official portrait, 2025

Member of the Moldovan Parliament
- Incumbent
- Assumed office 22 October 2025
- Parliamentary group: Party of Socialists
- In office 11 February 2021 – 23 July 2021
- Preceded by: Vladimir Golovatiuc
- Parliamentary group: Party of Socialists

Personal details
- Born: Grigorii Vladimirovici Uzun; 14 November 1986 (age 39) Vulcănești, Moldavian SSR, Soviet Union (now Moldova)
- Party: Party of Socialists of the Republic of Moldova (PSRM); Independent
- Education: Omsk State Technical University
- Occupation: Businessman, politician

Grigorii Vladimirovici Uzun (born 14 November 1986) is a Moldovan businessman and politician. Born in Vulcănești today in Gagauzia, he moved to Russia in 1999 and started a transportation business there. After returning to Moldova, Uzun became a member of the People's Assembly of Gagauzia as well as of the Parliament of Moldova for the Party of Socialists of the Republic of Moldova (PSRM). Supported by the PSRM, Uzun was defeated by Evghenia Guțul during the 2023 Gagauz gubernatorial election for the position of Governor (başkan) of Gagauzia.

== Biography ==
Grigorii Vladimirovici Uzun was born on 14 November 1986 in Vulcănești (Gagauz: Valkaneş), in the Moldavian SSR of the Soviet Union (now in Gagauzia, Moldova). In 1999, at the age of 13, he moved to Russia, where his parents were working. There, he finished his secondary education and then studied at the Omsk State Technical University. Despite his earned qualification as a petroleum engineer, Uzun has said he has not worked in the industry. After graduating from his university, Uzun returned to the town in Russia where his parents were living and developed together with them a transportation business named after himself.

Uzun later returned to Moldova and was a "trusted person" of presidential candidate Igor Dodon, who was the leader of the Party of Socialists of the Republic of Moldova (PSRM) at the time, during the 2016 Moldovan presidential election. In January 2017, Uzun became a member of the People's Assembly of Gagauzia after being elected in the Vulcănești electoral district during the 2016 Gagauz legislative election. Uzun has held the post of president of the Commission for Health, Social Protection, Family and Work of the assembly. A fight he participated in with several other people in Vulcănești on 19 January 2019, on the day of Epiphany, resulted in several local councillors of the town calling for his resignation from his post as member of the assembly.

Uzun was 37th on the list of candidates of the PSRM for the 2019 Moldovan parliamentary election. In 2021, he became member of the Parliament of Moldova of the PSRM, replacing Vladimir Golovatiuc after he was appointed as the Moldovan ambassador to Russia. He was not re-elected for this post on the 2021 Moldovan parliamentary election in July. Officially supported by the PSRM, Uzun ran as an independent candidate for the 2023 Gagauz gubernatorial election for the position of Governor (başkan) of Gagauzia. He was defeated during the second round on 14 May by Șor Party candidate Evghenia Guțul. Uzun obtained 24,926 (47.66%) of the votes while Guțul obtained 27,374 (52.34%) of them. Uzun had gotten 14,849 (26.4%) of the votes during the first round on 30 April, having been very close to Guțul, who got 14,890 (26.47%) of them.
