= Etulia =

Etulia Tülüküü
- Commune
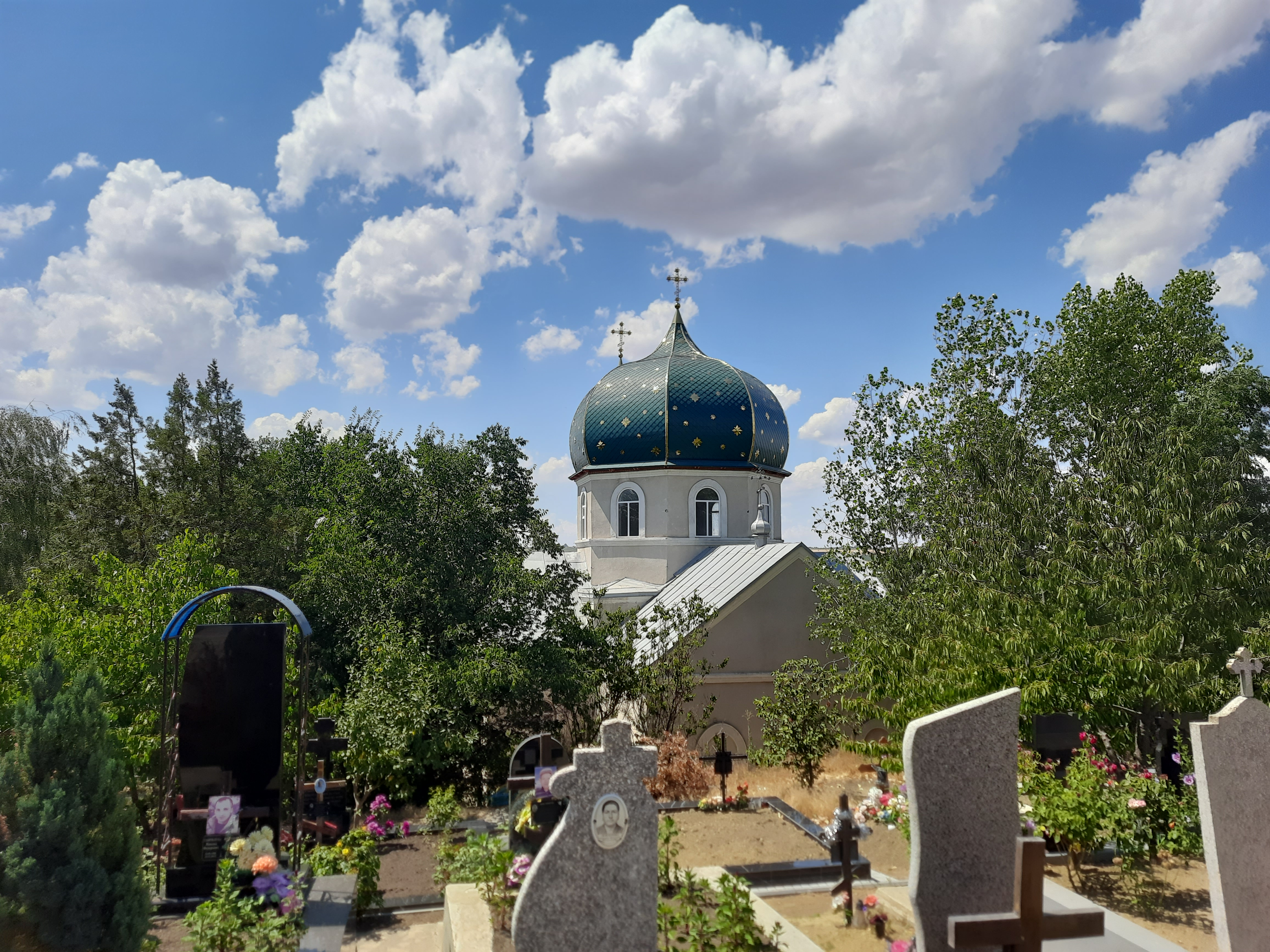
- Saint Athanasius church in Etulia

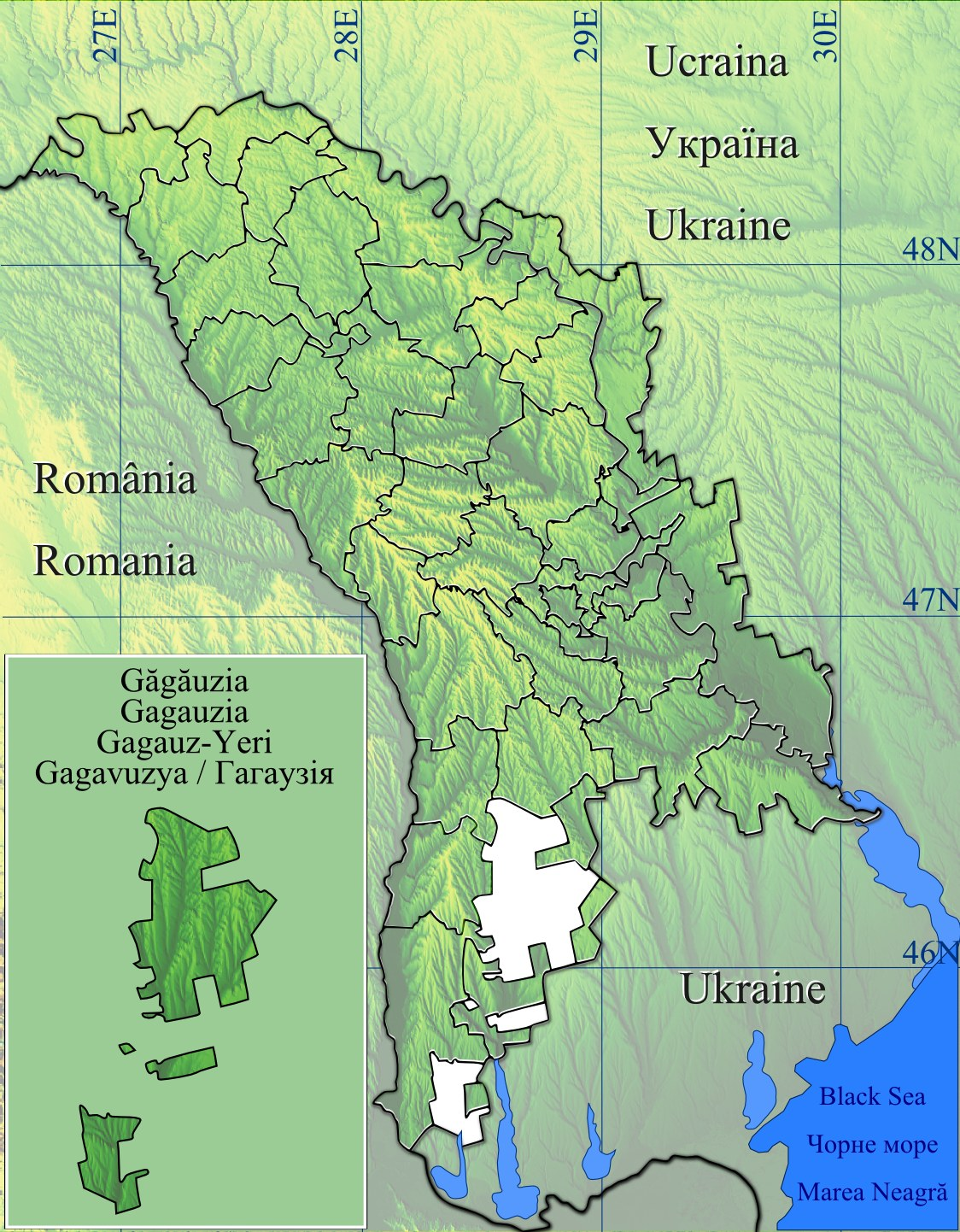
- Location of Etulia in Moldova
- Coordinates: 45°32′21″N 28°26′34″E
- Country: Moldova
- Autonomous Region: Gagauzia
- Founded: 1808, 1890

Government
  - Mayor: Natalya Popova

Population (2024)
  - Total: 2,080

Ethnicity (2024 census)
  - Gagauz people: 91.25%
  - Moldovans: 4.66%
  - other: 4.09%
- Time zone: UTC+2 (EET)
- Climate: Cfb
- Website: etulia.md

Etulia (Gagauz: Tülüküü) is a village and commune in the Vulcănești district, Gagauz Autonomous Territorial Unit of the Republic of Moldova. According to the 2024 Moldovan census the village has 2,080 people, 1,898 (91.25%) of them being Gagauz and 96 (4.66%) Moldovans.

It is composed of three villages:

- Etulia (Gag: Tülüküü)
- Etulia Nouă (Gag: Eni Tülüküü)
- Etulia, station (Gag: Tülüküü, demir yolu)

== History ==
=== Roman era ===
Etulia was the site of a Roman Castrum, amphorae ceramics and pottery of Roman time 2nd–3rd centuries AD have been found at the site. That corresponds to the time of construction and operation of the Trajan's Wall. It is thought that the Castrum was the site for a temporary or permanent military camp, since the area provided a strategic advantage. The nearby water reservoirs point to the era of Emperor Valent' campaigns.

=== Founding ===
The modern settlement was founded in 1808 by Gagauz and Bulgarian refugees from the Ottoman Empire, settling alongside Nogai-Tatars who were expelled in the mid 19th century. In 1890 Etulia Nouă (New-Etulia) and Etulia train station were founded, this is why the main settlement of Etulia is sometimes called "Old-Etulia".

=== 2024 drone incident ===
On 11 February 2024, Moldovan border police found fragments of a Russian drone in Etulia. On the night of 9 to 10 February, Russia had launched an attack with drones against Ukraine's Izmail Raion. Moldovan border police reported that the drone was suspected to have crashed in Moldova after being shut down by Ukrainian air defense forces. On 17 February, fragments of a Russian drone were again found in Moldova, near the village of Etulia Nouă. On 4 April, Moldovan border police found again the wreckage of a Russian drone near Etulia, at about 500 metres (1,600 feet) from the Moldova–Ukraine border. The previous night, Russia had launched an attack against Ukraine with drones.

== Notable people ==
- Evghenia Guțul (born 1986), Gagauz politician and former Governor of Gagauzia
- Artiom Zabun (born 1996), Moldovan footballer
