= Moldova–Russia relations =

- Moldova: Russia

Moldova–Russia relations are the bilateral relations between the Republic of Moldova and the Russian Federation, two Post-Soviet states. Russian support for the self-proclaimed Pridnestrovian Moldavian Republic (Transnistria) and a substantial Russian military presence therein strained Moldovan relations with Russia, according to the Foreign Policy Research Institute (FPRI).

Russo-Moldovan relations became a main focus of foreign policy for Republic of Moldova after the collapse of the Soviet Union. During the 1990-92 Transnistria War, Russia gave formal and informal support to Moldovan secessionist, direct intervention of Russian 14th Guards Army stationed in Moldova on behalf of the secessionist side resulted in end to fighting and the emergence of the internationally unrecognized entity of Transnistria.

Despite Moldova and Russia agreeing that Russian troops in Transnistria would leave by 2002, they did not leave, and proposals by Russia resulted in a deterioration in the relationship with economic pressure put on Moldova. Gradually Moldova began to look westward, culminating in 2020 with a new government determined to join the European Union. Russia's invasion of Ukraine in 2022 added momentum to Moldova's turning away from Russia.

== Pre-history ==
Following its victory in the Russo-Turkish War (1806–12), the Russian empire annexed Bessarabia from the Ottoman Empire. This historical region, which was originally part of the Principality of Moldavia, constitutes most of the territory of modern Moldova.

After the collapse of the Russian Empire, Bessarabia briefly gained independence from Russia as the Moldavian Democratic Republic in 1918. The same year, it entered into a union with the Kingdom of Romania, with whom it shares the same language and ethnicity. In 1924 the Soviet Union established the Moldavian Autonomous Soviet Socialist Republic, located east of the Dniester, as an autonomous republic within the Ukrainian SSR. Bessarabia was ceded by Romania to the Soviet Union in 1940. This led to the establishment of the Moldavian Soviet Socialist Republic (Moldavian SSR).

The Moldavian SSR declared sovereignty in June 1990 and proclaimed its independence from the USSR on August 27, 1991, repudiating the Molotov–Ribbentrop Pact and declaring the 1940 Soviet occupation illegal, thereby founding the Republic of Moldova. The Soviet Union was dissolved in December 1991.

== Post-independence and Transnistrian war ==
Russo-Moldovan relations became a main focus of foreign policy for newly established Republic of Moldova. During the war of Transnistria, Russia gave formal and informal support to Transnistrian secessionists, direct intervention of Russian 14th Guards Army stationed in Moldova on behalf of the secessionist side resulted in an end to the fighting and the emergence of the internationally unrecognized entity of Transnistria. Russian-brokered ceasefire, cemented the status quo, and left two separate groups of Russian military forces remained in Moldova: a small peacekeeping regiment, which is part of the Joint Control Commission, and the 14th Army, which was tasked with guarding a large Soviet ammunition depot in Cobasna on Transnistria-controlled territory. Evacuation of this depot was eventually stalled and Russian military presence in Moldova continues to this day, against the will of the Moldovan Government.

Following 1997 Moscow memorandum, Russia and Moldova signed an agreement on military co-operation. In 1999, an agreement on economic co-operation was signed and Russia committed itself to withdraw its troops and weapons from Moldova by the end of 2002, which did not happen. Relations between Moldova and Russia deteriorated in November 2003 over a Russian proposal for the solution of the Transnistria conflict, which Moldovan authorities refused to accept. In 2006, a diplomatic conflict resulted in the Russian ban of Moldovan wines, damaging the wine industry of Moldova considerably, as Russia remained the largest importer of Moldovan wines by far.

== 21st century relations ==
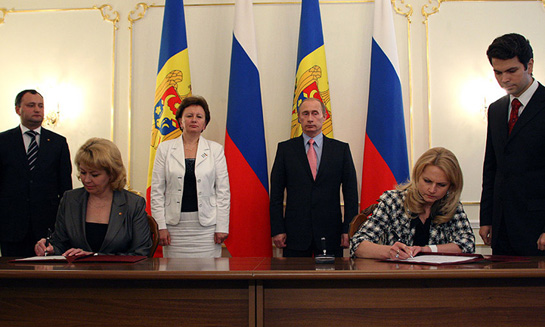
Zinaida Greceanîi with Prime Minister Putin in June 2008.

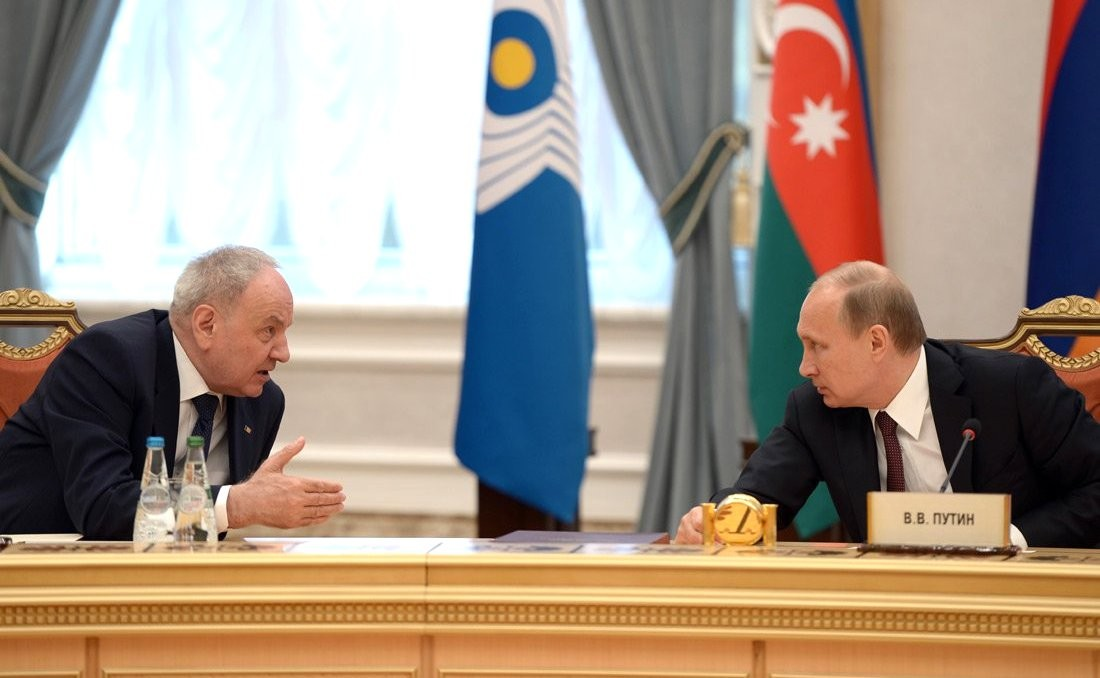
Nicolae Timofti speaking with Vladimir Putin during a summit in Minsk (2014, Belarus).

On September 8, 2015, after a Russian military attaché attended at a military parade celebrating the proclamation of Transnistria the Moldovan government called it an "unfriendly" action on Moscow's part and suspended military relations with the Russian Federation. On July 21, 2017, Moldovan parliament passed a declaration asking calling for the removal of Russian troops, weapons, and military equipment from the Transnistria region. After the Constitutional Court of Moldova ruled that the "stationing of any military troops or bases on the territory of the Republic of Moldova, managed and controlled by foreign states, is unconstitutional."

In the 10 years that followed, the Moldovan parliament became dominated by pro-European parties who sought to move the country away from Russian influence and to move closer to Romania and the European Union (EU).

=== Dodon presidency ===
In December 2016, Igor Dodon, the leader of the Party of Socialists of the Republic of Moldova, was elected to the presidency with a pro-Russian platform, and a promise to identify with the former Soviet Union and Eastern Bloc. Since becoming president, he has visited the Russian Federation numerous times on state and working visits, having visited the country over a dozen times by January 2019. He was, however, defeated in the 2020 Moldovan presidential election by Maia Sandu, who became the new President of Moldova.

During the worldwide COVID-19 pandemic, Russia helped Moldova with its vaccination campaign with 71,000 Sputnik V COVID-19 vaccine units twice, once on 24 April 2021 and another on 30 April 2021. Vaccination with this vaccine officially started in Moldova on 4 May 2021. However, these deliveries provoked many controversies, first because former Moldovan President Dodon was accused of inflating the number of vaccine units Russia gave to Moldova, later because Russia gave vaccine doses to Transnistria without the intermediation of the Moldovan authorities as had been done previously with donations from other countries, and lastly because it was claimed Russia had given Moldova vaccine units that were supposed to go to Slovakia but which the country rejected later.

== Current relations ==
In April 2023 Russian MFA spokeswoman Maria Zakharova complained that Moldova was become a tool of the European Union, and that the new EU civilian mission to Moldova was "unlikely to help stabilize the situation in the country and the region.. We see that the EU is increasingly trying to gain a foothold in the post-Soviet space."

A document written in 2021 by the Russia's FSB's Directorate for Cross-Border Cooperation, titled “Strategic objectives of the Russian Federation in the Republic of Moldova” sets out a 10-year plan to destabilise Moldova. Using energy blackmail, political and elite sources in Moldova that are favourable to Russia and the Orthodox Church. Russia denies any such plan.

=== Russian invasion of Ukraine ===
==== 2022 ====
On 25 February 2022, during the Russian invasion of Ukraine, the Moldovan chemical tanker MV Millennial Spirit, which was navigating through the Black Sea at the time, was shelled by Russian military forces.

In light of the invasion of Ukraine, the government of Moldova banned the Russian military symbols V and Z on 7 April 2022. Pro-Russian parties in Moldova protested the ban on the nationalist symbols, accusing the Moldovan government of erasing their history. Furthermore, it was reported that ethnic Russians in Moldova vandalised the World War II Chișinău Heroes' Cemetery following this decision. The spokeswoman for the Russian Foreign Ministry, Maria Zakharova, and Russian senator Aleksey Pushkov condemned the Moldovan government's ban on the nationalist symbols.

On 22 April, the Russian major general Rustam Minnekayev said that one of the objectives of the Russian invasion of Ukraine was to establish a land corridor with occupied Transnistria, claiming that there was "evidence that the Russian-speaking population is being oppressed" in the region without giving further detail on the issue. Following this, a series of explosions of unknown authorship occurred in Transnistria. They may have been a false flag operation by Russia or Transnistria.

In May 2022, the Russian hacking group Killnet attacked several websites of official institutions in Moldova.

In August 2022, Russia banned the import of most agricultural products from Moldova, after Russia claimed that they contained "dangerous quarantine objects". However, it is speculated that the real reason for the ban is because Moldova asked for an extension on payment for its August supply of natural gas from Russia. Russia has a history of using trade as a weapon in disputes over energy and energy payments.

On 30 September, after the annexation referendums in Russian-occupied Ukraine and the Russian annexation of Donetsk, Kherson, Luhansk and Zaporizhzhia oblasts, Sandu declared that the 2022 Russian invasion of Ukraine had "dramatically affected" relations between Moldova and Russia.

On 10 October, amid a series of Russian missile strikes over Ukrainian cities, the Moldovan Minister of Foreign Affairs and European Integration Nicu Popescu announced that three Russian missiles had breached Moldovan airspace. Popescu strongly condemned this and said that Russia's ambassador to Moldova had been summoned as a result of this incident. Later, on 31 October, Russia launched a new wave of missile strikes over Ukraine. One of the Russian missiles was taken down by a Ukrainian air defence system and crashed into Naslavcea, a village within the territory of Moldova. Although windows of some residential buildings on the village were shattered, no casualties were reported. Moldovan authorities strongly condemned this new wave of Russian strikes. On 5 December, as a result of another Russian wave of attacks against Ukraine, a missile fell near the city of Briceni within Moldova's territory.

==== 2023 ====
On 14 January 2023, due to yet another wave of missile strikes, another missile fell into the Moldovan village of Larga, violating Moldova's airspace. Russia violated Moldovan airspace once again on 10 February. On 16 February, Moldovan police found missile debris in Larga once again. This was the fourth time a Russian missile or its debris hit Moldova.

In February 2023 Russia canceled a 2012 decree underpinning Moldova's sovereignty.

On 17 April 2023, Moldova barred the entry of the chief of the Moscow fief Republic of Tatarstan Rustam Minnikhanov, upon his entry on a plane in Chișinău. He had allegedly sought to interfere in the 2023 Gagauz gubernatorial election. On 19 April, a Russian diplomat was declared persona non grata by Moldova over his misbehaviour at the airport during the Minnikhanov affair.

On 22 June 2023, Ukraine destroyed a bridge at Chonhar connecting Crimea with Russian-occupied parts of southern mainland Ukraine. Following this, Vladimir Saldo, the Russian-appointed governor of occupied Kherson Oblast, threatened that Russia would destroy bridges in Odesa in Ukraine but also a bridge connecting Giurgiulești in Moldova with Galați in Romania. A spokesman for the Ministry of Foreign Affairs and European Integration of Moldova, Igor Zaharov, strongly condemned Saldo's statements and announced that the Russian ambassador to Moldova Oleg Vasnetsov had been summoned as a result. The Prime Minister of Romania Marcel Ciolacu also condemned Saldo's declarations. Vasnetsov did not respond to his summoning, though the secretary of Russia's embassy in Chișinău, Anatoly Loshakov, declared that the "special military operation" was restricted to Ukraine and that its course and objectives were attributed exclusively to the Ministry of Defence of Russia and not to representatives of regional administrations. On the same day, Igor Grosu, the President of the Moldovan Parliament, announced that it was intended to reduce the number of diplomats in Russia's Embassy in Chișinău, adding that the Russian Federation behaves like an empire trying to expand its borders, that it does not respect international laws and that it has never respected its neighbors or the post-Soviet states. The mayor of Giurgiulești, Tatiana Gălățeanu, commented that there was concern among the inhabitants of the town, that Moldova would be affected if Ukraine failed to contain the war on its territory and that "we cannot really do anything" about the situation. She also explained that Giurgiulești is a strategic point because of its bridge that connects Romania and the European Union with Moldova and Ukraine. Giurgiulești also hosts Moldova's only port.

On 26 July 2023, Popescu announced that the number of staff in the Russian Embassy in Chișinău would be significantly decreased amid espionage concerns. Both Vasnetsov and the spokeswoman of the Ministry of Foreign Affairs of Russia Maria Zakharova protested against this decision, with the latter saying that it "will not remain unanswered". 45 Russian diplomats were then expelled for spying, reducing the embassy to 25, the same as the Moldovan Embassy in Moscow.

On 25 September 2023, a missile crashed into Chițcani, for the first time in Moldovan territory controlled by Transnistria.

In November 2023 Russia's foreign minister, Sergey Lavrov, threatened Moldova at an OSCE conference, saying the Republic is putting itself in danger with its desire to join the European Union, "Moldova is destined to be the next victim in the hybrid war against Russia".

==== 2024 ====
On 11 February 2024, fragments of a Russian drone were found in the Moldovan village of Etulia. It was suspected to have crashed in Moldova after being shot down by Ukrainian air defense forces. A Russian attack with drones against Ukraine's Izmail Raion had taken place earlier on the night of 9 to 10 February. On 17 February, fragments of a Russian drone were again found in Etulia Nouă. This happened again on 4 April, when the wreckage of a Russian drone was found again near Etulia following a Russian attack against Ukraine with drones the previous night.

=== Transnistria ===
Transnistria, a de facto independent region of Moldova since the collapse of the USSR, is supported by Russia, although Russia has not recognised Transnistria. There have been proposals in Transnistria for joining the Russian Federation. In March 2023, Transnisitria's government accused Ukraine of carrying out an attempted assassination against its leader, which Ukraine denied. In February 2024 Transnistrian officials asked Russia for "protection" while accusing Moldova of blocking imports in an "economic war" and turning the region into a "ghetto".

Around 1,500 Russian soldiers have been permanently stationing the region.

== Trade ==
In 2021 Moldovan exports to Russia were $345m of goods with apples and pears being the main product. Russian exports were $1.02 billion with natural gas being the main product. Since 1995 Moldovan exports have shown almost no growth whereas Russian exports have risen by an average of 5.52% per annum.

Russia cut off gas supplies in 2022 and Moldova has resolved to cease buying any energy related goods from Russia.

== State visits ==
In March 2017, Prime Minister Pavel Filip ordered a ban of official visits by government officials to Russia. This ban was lifted by Prime Minister Maia Sandu in June 2019.

=== Visits of Russian leaders to Moldova ===
- President Boris Yeltsin (1997)
- President Vladimir Putin (June 2000)
- Prime Minister Vladimir Putin (November 2008)
- President Dmitry Medvedev (October 2009)

President Dodon floated a potential visit by Putin in August 2019; however, it did not eventuate.

=== Visits of Moldovan leaders to Russia ===
A joint news conference between Vladimir Putin and Igor Dodon in Moscow, January 2017.

- President Petru Lucinschi (July 2000)
- President Vladimir Voronin (September 2001)
- President Vladimir Voronin (June 2009)
- President Igor Dodon (January 2017)
- President Igor Dodon (May 2017)
- President Igor Dodon (May 2020)

== Resident diplomatic missions ==
- Moldova has an embassy in Moscow.
- Russia has an embassy in Chișinău.
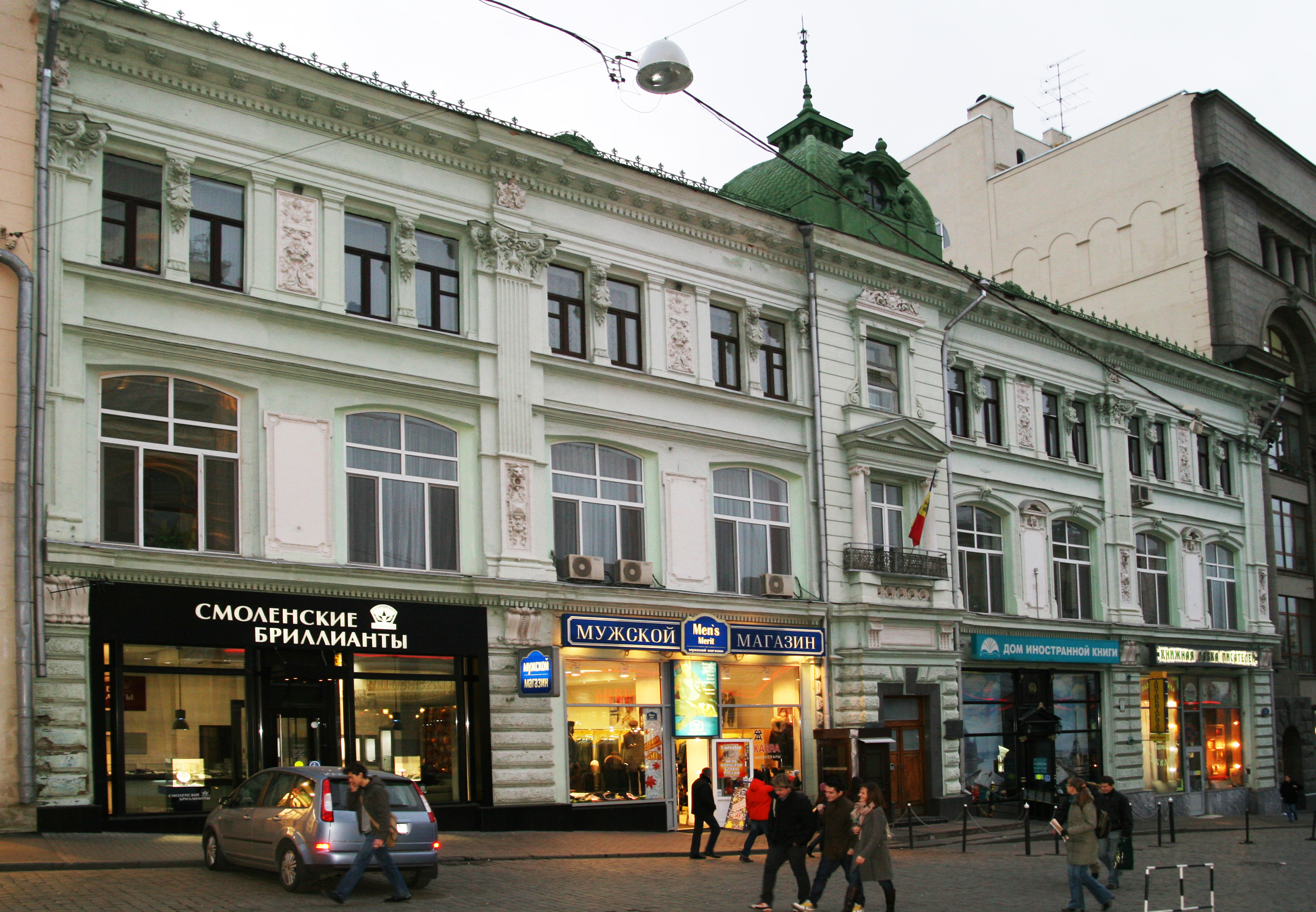
Embassy of Moldova in Moscow

Embassy of Russia in Chișinău

=== List of ambassadors of Moldova to Russia ===
- Petru Lucinschi (1992–1993)
- Anatol Țăranu (1993–1995)
- Valeriu Pasat (1995–1997)
- Valeriu Bobuțac (1998–2001)
- Vladimir Țurcan (2002–2005)
- Vasile Sturza (2006–2008)
- Andrei Neguța (2009–2012)
- Andrei Galbur (2012–2015)
- Dumitru Braghiș (2015–2017)
- Andrei Neguța (2017–2020)
- Vladimir Golovatiuc (2020–2021)
- Lilian Darii (2022–present)

== See also ==
- Dissolution of the Soviet Union
- List of ambassadors of Russia to Moldova
- Greater Russia
- Moldova–European Union relations
- Moldova–NATO relations
- Moldova–Ukraine relations
- Romania–Russia relations
- Moldovans in Russia
- Russians in Moldova
- Transnistria conflict
- 2022 Moldovan energy crisis
- 2025 Moldovan energy crisis
