= Chioselia Rusă =

Chioselia Rusă Köseli Rus
- Village
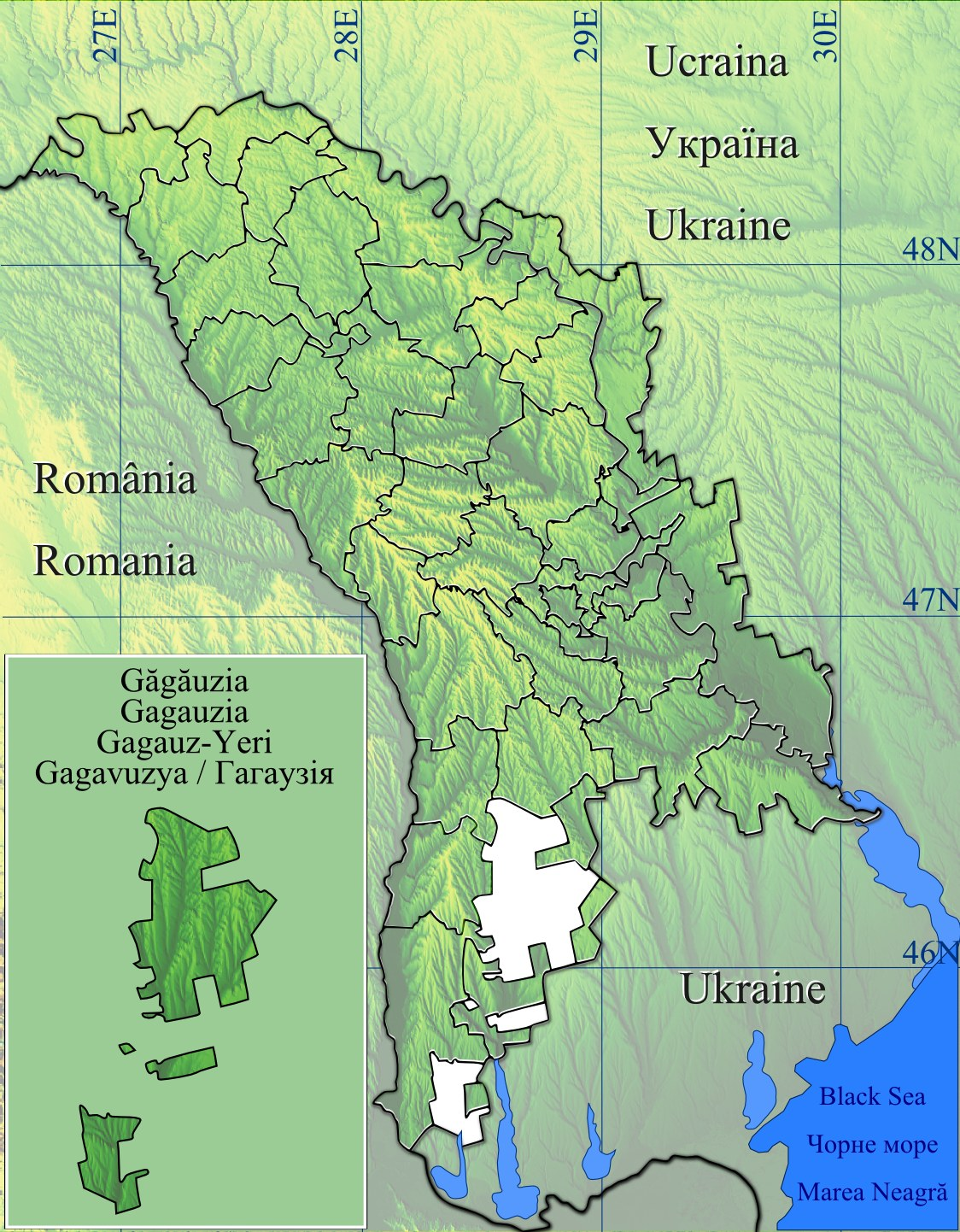
- Location of Chioselia Rusă in Moldova
- Coordinates: 46°05′07″N 28°30′54″E
- Country: Moldova
- Autonomous Region: Gagauzia
- Founded: 1891

Government
  - Mayor: Georgiy Gospodinov

Population (2024)
  - Total: 422

Ethnicity (2024 census)
  - Moldovans: 38.86%
  - Gagauz people: 25.82%
  - Ukrainians: 21.09%
  - other: 14.23%
- Time zone: UTC+2 (EET)
- Climate: Cfb

Chioselia Rusă (Gagauz: Köseli Rus) is a village in the Comrat district, Gagauz Autonomous Territorial Unit of the Republic of Moldova. According to the 2024 Moldovan census the village has 422 people, 164 (38.86%) of them being Moldovans and 109 (25.82%) Gagauz.

== History ==
The village was founded in 1891, administered by the Bolgrad Cathedral and initially recorded as Katlabug (Russian: Катлабуг), not to be confused with Katlabuh, Ukraine.

== Notable people ==
- Ilia Uzun (born 1967), Gagauz politician and acting Governor of Gagauzia
