= Vladimir Golovatiuc =

Moldavian politician and economist (born 1962)

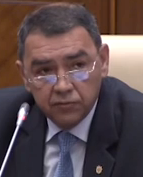
- Golovatiuc in 2015

Moldovan Ambassador to Russia
- In office 16 December 2020 – 19 August 2021
- President: Igor Dodon; Maia Sandu
- Prime Minister: Ion Chicu; Aureliu Ciocoi (acting); Natalia Gavrilița
- Preceded by: Andrei Neguța
- Succeeded by: Lilian Darii

Member of the Moldovan Parliament
- In office 9 December 2014 – 16 December 2020
- Succeeded by: Grigorii Uzun
- Parliamentary group: Party of Socialists

Personal details
- Born: 7 June 1962 (age 63) Brăviceni, Moldavian SSR, Soviet Union

Vladimir Golovatiuc (born 7 June 1962) is a Moldovan economist, diplomat and politician. He served as the Moldovan ambassador to Russia and member of the Moldovan parliament.
