= Evghenia Guțul =

Moldovan politician

- Evgeniya Guţul or Guțul (Gagauz)
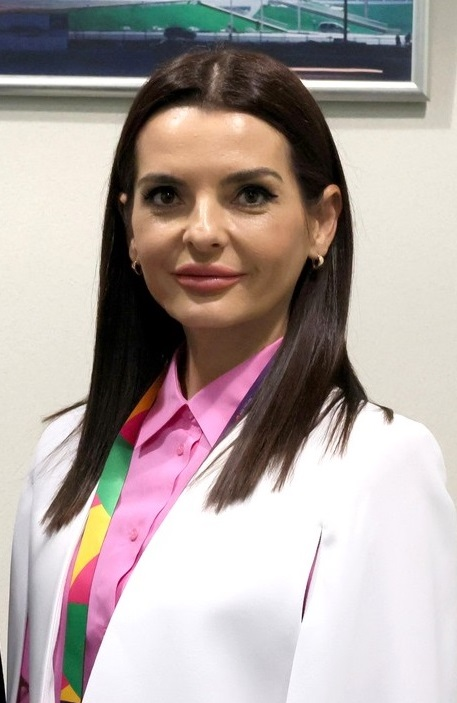
- Guțul in 2024

Governor of Gagauzia
- In office 19 July 2023 – 5 August 2025
- Preceded by: Irina Vlah
- Succeeded by: Ilia Uzun (acting)

Personal details
- Born: 5 September 1986 (age 40) Etulia, Moldavian SSR, Soviet Union (now Gagauzia, Moldova)
- Party: Victory (since 2024)
- Other political affiliations: Șor Party (2018–2023); Independent (before 2018, 2023–2024)

Evghenia Guțul (born 5 September 1986; Gagauz: Evgeniya Guţul or Guțul), also rendered Yevgenia Gutsul (Russian: Евгения Гуцул) and Eugenia Guțul, is a Moldovan Gagauz jurist and politician, who served as Governor of Gagauzia (başkan) from July 2023 to August 2025.

As governor, she has sought to have closer relations with Russia. Following her party's banning by Moldovan authorities, she has been an independent. She has been sanctioned by the EU Council for promoting separatism, and by the United States' Office of Foreign Assets Control.

In April 2024, she was indicted in a criminal case with the Anti-Corruption Prosecutor's Office of Moldova, and in August 2025 she was sentenced to seven years in jail for using undeclared Russian funds to finance her Șor Party.

== Early life ==
Guțul was born on 5 September 1986 in the village of Etulia, a Gagauz village in the Moldavian SSR of the Soviet Union. Guțul's maiden name is Buiucli. She is married and has two children, and as of 2023 continued to maintain Etulia as her permanent place of residence.

After attending school to become a lawyer, she worked as a telephone operator from 2012 to 2014. Afterwards she worked as a telecommunications operator, commercial representative, and archivist. Guțul only entered politics when she worked as a secretary for her local Șor Party branch in 2018. Prior to her 2023 election, Guțul had no significant political background.

== Political career ==
Guțul built her political career as a pro-Russian activist. On 22 March 2023, she was selected as candidate for Governor of Gagauzia by the Șor Party. During the election campaign, Guțul promised that if she was elected, she would build an airport in Gagauzia worth 100 million euros, increase the salaries of budget workers by 30%, build an amusement park and that there would be other investments in infrastructure, education and other sectors of the economy. Some journalists described many of the promises as unrealistic, as in their assessment the implementation of such projects were beyond the powers of the Governor. Guțul was supported in the elections by pro-Russian fugitive oligarch and party chair Ilan Shor, lawmakers Marina Tauber and Reghina Apostolova and several Russian performers and artists such as Nikolay Baskov, Philipp Kirkorov and Stas Mikhaylov, as well as Leonid Slutsky, the leader of the Russian ultra-nationalist LDPR.

=== Political views ===
In March 2024, she met with President of Russia Vladimir Putin to ask for Russia's help "in defending [Gagauzia's] legitimate rights, powers and positions" against the "lawlessness of the authorities in Moldova". When meeting with Putin, Guțul discussed "complex regional and geopolitical issues, in the epicentre of which the region is located". Guțul said she was ready to open a representative office of Gagauzia in Moscow, to which she was reminded in Chișinău that Gagauzia was not a separate subject of international law and was part of Moldova.

Guțul said that in case of a potential unification of Moldova and Romania, she wanted to initiate secession from Moldova and was ready to ask Russia for "protection" if this was obstructed. Guțul said Gagauzia opposed unification with Romania, and "many residents of the autonomy and the whole of Moldova oppose Moldova's accession to the EU". The American Institute for the Study of War (ISW) said that Guțul's remarks were an attempt by the Kremlin "to use pro-Russian players in Moldova to destabilize Moldovan democracy and society, prevent Moldova's accession to the EU, or even to justify future hybrid or conventional operations against Moldova". President of Moldova Maia Sandu stated Guțul's visits to Moscow meant that she supported the Russian invasion of Ukraine.

=== Governor of Gagauzia ===
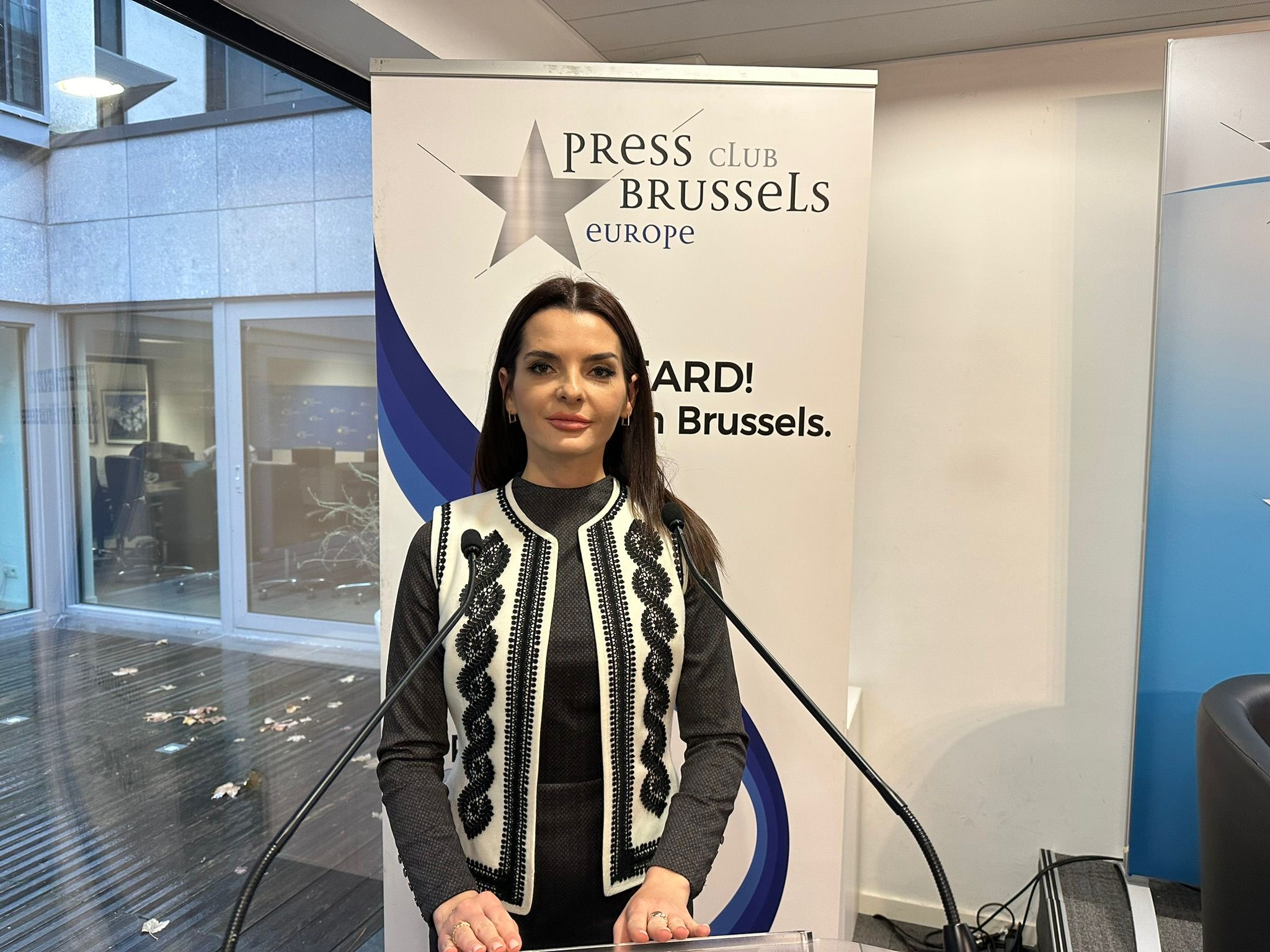
Guțul at a Press Club Brussels Europe press conference in December 2023

In the 2023 Gagauz gubernatorial election, she finished the first round in first place with 14,890 votes (26.47%), but given the fact that a majority was not met, the second round took place on 14 May. In the second round, Guțul obtained 27,376 of the votes (52.39%), defeating the independent candidate Grigorii Uzun, supported by the Party of Socialists of the Republic of Moldova (PSRM), who had 24,926 votes (47.66%), thus winning a 4-year mandate at the head of the autonomous unit. In her victory speech, Guțul affirmed her intention to align the region closer with Russia. Following the banning of the Șor Party on 19 June 2023, Guțul announced that she would take office and govern Gagauzia as a political independent.

On 19 July 2023, the inauguration of Guțul as Governor of Gagauzia (also known as başkan) took place. The event was not attended by Irina Vlah, the former governor, and therefore the symbolic procedure of transfer of power did not take place. Sandu, Prime Minister of Moldova Dorin Recean, and members of the Parliament of Moldova of the ruling Party of Action and Solidarity (PAS) said they would not attend the inauguration. Representatives of the Comrat Court of Appeal, which approved the election results, were also not present at the event. According to the Statute of Gagauzia, the oath of office is taken no later than 30 days after the official announcement of the election results, in a solemn atmosphere at a special session of the People's Assembly (parliament) and Tribunal of Gagauzia, in the Gagauz language. Instead, the results were announced by the head of the CEC of Gagauzia, Iana Covalenco, in Russian. Furthermore, representatives of Moldovan diplomatic missions were absent at the event. During the oath of office, Guțul did not put her hand on the Moldovan Constitution, and after finishing reading the oath, Guțul kissed only the flag of the Gagauz autonomy, without kissing the flag of Moldova. The governor promised to hold a press conference and answer journalists' questions, some of whom asked which was the source of funding for this event. However, Guțul and People's Assembly chairman Dmitri Constantinov left the stage in a hurry.

Guțul named Sergei Ibrishim as the head of the Main Directorate of the Agro-Industrial Complex of Gagauzia, the governmental branch in charge of agriculture and industry. Ibrishim wrote to the Kremlin asking Russia to abolish excise taxes and customs duties for Gagauz exports to Russia. Gagauz businesses had been unable to sell goods to Russia after Moldova withdrew from the CIS Interparliamentary Assembly in July 2023.

Guțul conducted a state visit to Russia from March 1 to 8 March 2024, during which she met with Russian officials. Guțul outlined three key economic policies that would be created as a result of her visit. The first would be a "special gas tariff", independent from Moldova's tariff, without input from Moldovan officials, bypassing sanctions placed on Russian natural gas companies. Secondly, Gagauzia and its residents would be integrated into the Russian MIR payment system. Lastly, Gagauzia would have independent excise taxes and duties on Russian goods, without input from the Moldovan government. The ISW deemed this a form of "energy blackmail" against Moldova, as the lower tariffs would make it nearly impossible for the Moldovan government to reduce dependence on Gagauzia's four Gazprom natural gas power plants.

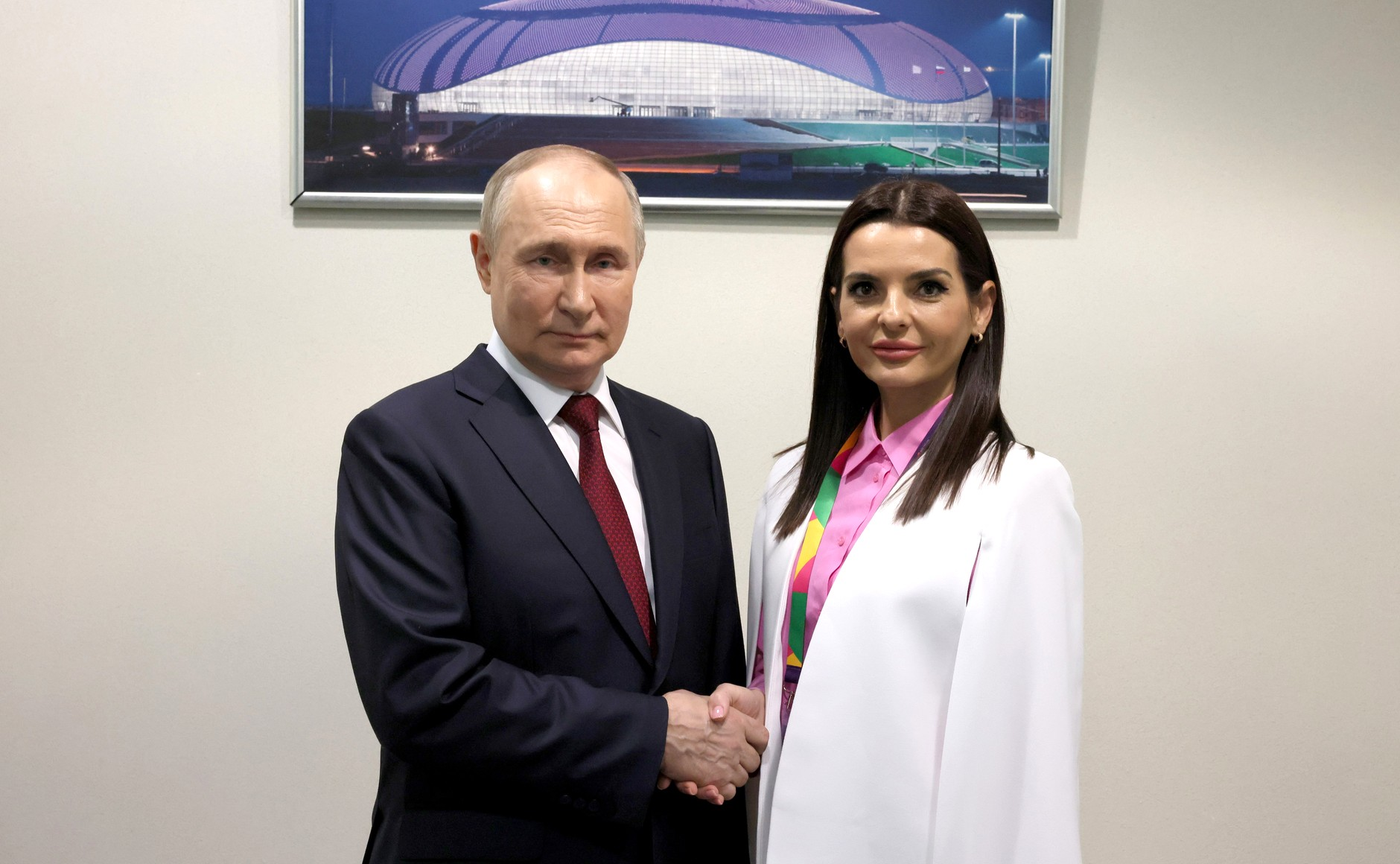
Guțul with President of Russia Vladimir Putin in 2024

On 13 March 2024, Guțul announced that she was organizing a meeting with prominent pro-Russian politicians of Moldova such as Shor, Igor Dodon, Vladimir Voronin and the leadership of the Revival Party. The ISW stated that this quadrumvir of Dodon, Guțul, Shor and Voronin were possibly organizing into one singular opposition movement against the pro-European ruling PAS to contest the 2024 presidential and 2025 parliamentary elections. On 9 April 2024, Guțul and Constantinov signed an agreement in Moscow on the use of Mir cards in Gagauzia. According to Guțul, "these measures will allow to overcome the economic blockade organized by Chișinău and to bring to Gagauzia funds for financing social, infrastructural and economic projects".

On 21 April 2024, a congress was held which brought together about 500 supporters of Shor. The agreement to unite several opposition political forces into the Victory bloc was signed by Guțul, who became the executive secretary of the national political council. For the Russian press, the event was described as "a congress of Moldovan politicians supporting Chișinău's accession to the Eurasian Economic Union".

== International sanctions ==
On 12 June 2024, the United States Treasury's Office of Foreign Assets Control imposed sanctions on Guțul, freezing any assets held by her in the country and banning its citizens from dealing with her.

On 14 October 2024, the EU Council imposed personal sanctions on Guțul for "promoting separatism in Gagauzia, thereby attempting to overthrow the constitutional order and threatening the sovereignty and independence of Moldova".

== Criminal case ==
In January 2022, a criminal prosecution against Guțul was launched. The Anti-Corruption Prosecutor's Office of Moldova brought charges against her for receiving and smuggling money from Russia to finance the pro-Russian Șor Party, which was posteriorly banned. According to the investigation, in 2019–2022, Guțul, while working as a secretary in the party, systematically imported into Moldova money received from an organized criminal group from Russia. Subsequently, this money was integrated into the party's activities in order to support itself in the Moldovan political arena. There was another accusation according to which Guțul, as an accomplice, in the period from October to November 2022, coordinated the activity of some territorial branches of the Șor Party in the districts of Moldova. She was responsible for verifying, approving lists and remunerating protesters in front of state institutions in Chișinău: Parliament, Government, Presidency, Prosecutor General's Office, etc. (at the same time, the actions were organized by a party declared unconstitutional in the country). Thus, she knowingly accepted funding for the political party from an organized criminal group for a total amount of about 42.5 million lei (more than 2.2 million euros).

On 24 April 2024, the Anti-Corruption Prosecutor's Office of Moldova announced that it had completed the investigation and submitted the case against Guțul to the court. The hearing of the case was postponed several times, with Guțul being unable to attend the court session purportedly for health reasons. If proven guilty, Guțul would face imprisonment from 2 to 7 years and a temporal ban on holding public office.

Guțul criticized the hearings, stating that lengthy sessions, up to two hours at a time, are spent reviewing low-quality video evidence in which both visuals and audio are unclear, making it difficult to establish relevance to the charges. Guțul wrote a letter to Putin, asking him to use diplomatic pressure against Moldova to secure her release. She also issued a statement through Telegram requesting help from President of Turkey Recep Tayyip Erdoğan.

=== Escalation of legal battles ===
On 25 March 2025, Guțul was detained at Chișinău International Airport as she prepared to depart for Istanbul in Turkey reportedly to attend an event hosted by the Global Journalism Council. The arrest marked a dramatic escalation in her conflict with Moldova's central authorities and ruling government. Moldovan police held her for an initial 72-hour period without immediate charges, a move Guțul's legal team decried as unlawful. Subsequently, the Anti-Corruption Prosecutor's Office accused her of illegal financing of her 2023 gubernatorial campaign. Guțul firmly denied these charges, labeling them as politically motivated attacks on Gagauzia's autonomy.

On 26 March, the People's Assembly of Gagauzia issued an emergency statement condemning the detention of Guțul. The deputies called the incident a politically motivated persecution aimed at weakening the region's autonomy, and demanded the immediate release of the head of Gagauzia. Critics, including Gagauz officials and human rights advocates, condemned the decision to place Guțul at Prison 13 in Chișinău, rather than at the National Anti-Corruption Center's own detention center, as a deliberate act of humiliation. Guțul herself labeled the proceedings a "legal absurdity" and an attack on Gagauz autonomy, a sentiment amplified by her supporters, who saw her detention as emblematic of a purported Moldovan broader campaign to suppress regional dissent. On 9 April 2025, a court in Chișinău changed the detention measure from pre-trial detention to house arrest for 30 days. On 5 August 2025, Guțul was sentenced to seven years in jail and re-arrested after the sentencing.

=== Protests in Gagauzia and beyond ===
On 16 April, approximately 5,000 residents gathered in Comrat, the capital of Gagauzia, for a mass rally in support of Guțul, protesting her house arrest and perceived pressure from Moldovan authorities. The demonstrators, including local parliament deputies and government members, adopted a resolution demanding Guțul's release and the restoration of Gagauzia's autonomous rights.

The international reaction underscored Gagauzia's historical dependence on external backing, particularly from Russia and Turkey, both of which have maintained close ties with the region. Turkish media portrayed the arrest as an attack on democracy and civil liberties, raising concerns about Moldova's political stability and the potential erosion of the Gagauz people's cultural autonomy. These reports also emphasized Turkey's long-standing support for Gagauzia.

Russia condemned the arrest, with presidential spokesperson Dmitry Peskov calling it a breach of democratic norms and an act of political pressure against pro-Russian figures in Moldova. Russian Foreign Ministry spokeswoman Maria Zakharova alleged that the case was part of a broader crackdown on dissent ahead of Moldova's 2025 parliamentary election.

=== Sentencing ===
On 5 August 2025, Guțul was sentenced to seven years in prison for laundering money from Russia to support the Șor Party from 2019 to 2022. The court also found her guilty of accepting the equivalent of some 2.5 million dollars from an "organised criminal group" to support her party. Guțul stated that she did not accept the verdict. Her lawyer announced that he plans to appeal the decision, opining that "this is not a trial, but a public execution". Russia condemned the ruling as politically motivated and anti-democratic.

At the same hearing as Guțul, Svetlana Popan, former secretary of the Șor Party, was sentenced to six years in prison and barred from holding any positions related to the financial management of a party and from membership in any party for five years. Between September and November 2022, Popan illegally received 9.8 million lei, which she used to pay protesters, unofficially pay employees of the Șor Party's regional offices and other illicit activities. Popan stated she was innocent, and her lawyer too said he would appeal her sentence.

The ruling was rendered just weeks before the upcoming 2025 parliamentary election, described by Bloomberg News as a test between pro-European president Sandu and Russian influences. Warsaw-based political scientist Oktawian Milewski stated that "Moldovan authorities will showcase Guțul's sentencing as an instance of success in the fight against the oligarchic networks supported by the Kremlin in Moldova". After the ruling, over 100 people attended a pro-Guțul rally in Chișinău.

The judge who treated Guțul's case was subjected for several months to pressure and intimidation, including death threats, images of murdered and decapitated people and false messages about the judge's death to her relatives.
