= Lilian Darii =

Moldovan diplomat

Moldovan Ambassador to Russia, Kyrgyzstan and Tajikistan
- Incumbent
- Assumed office 16 February 2022
- President: Maia Sandu
- Prime Minister: Natalia Gavrilița; Dorin Recean; Alexandru Munteanu; Eugen Osmochescu (acting); Vasile Tofan
- Preceded by: Vladimir Golovatiuc

Moldovan Ambassador to Belgium and Luxembourg
- In office 26 March 2018 – 2 February 2022
- President: Igor Dodon; Maia Sandu
- Prime Minister: Pavel Filip; Maia Sandu; Ion Chicu; Aureliu Ciocoi (acting); Natalia Gavrilița
- Preceded by: Iurie Reniță
- Succeeded by: Viorel Cibotaru

Deputy Minister of Foreign Affairs and European Integration
- In office 2 March 2016 – 7 November 2017
- President: Nicolae Timofti; Igor Dodon
- Prime Minister: Pavel Filip
- Minister: Andrei Galbur

Personal details
- Born: 6 October 1970 (age 55) Negureni, Moldavian SSR, Soviet Union
- Education: Moldova State University

Lilian Darii (born 6 October 1970) is a Moldovan diplomat, who currently serves as the Moldovan Ambassador to Russia.
