= Beșghioz =

Beșghioz Beşgöz
- Commune
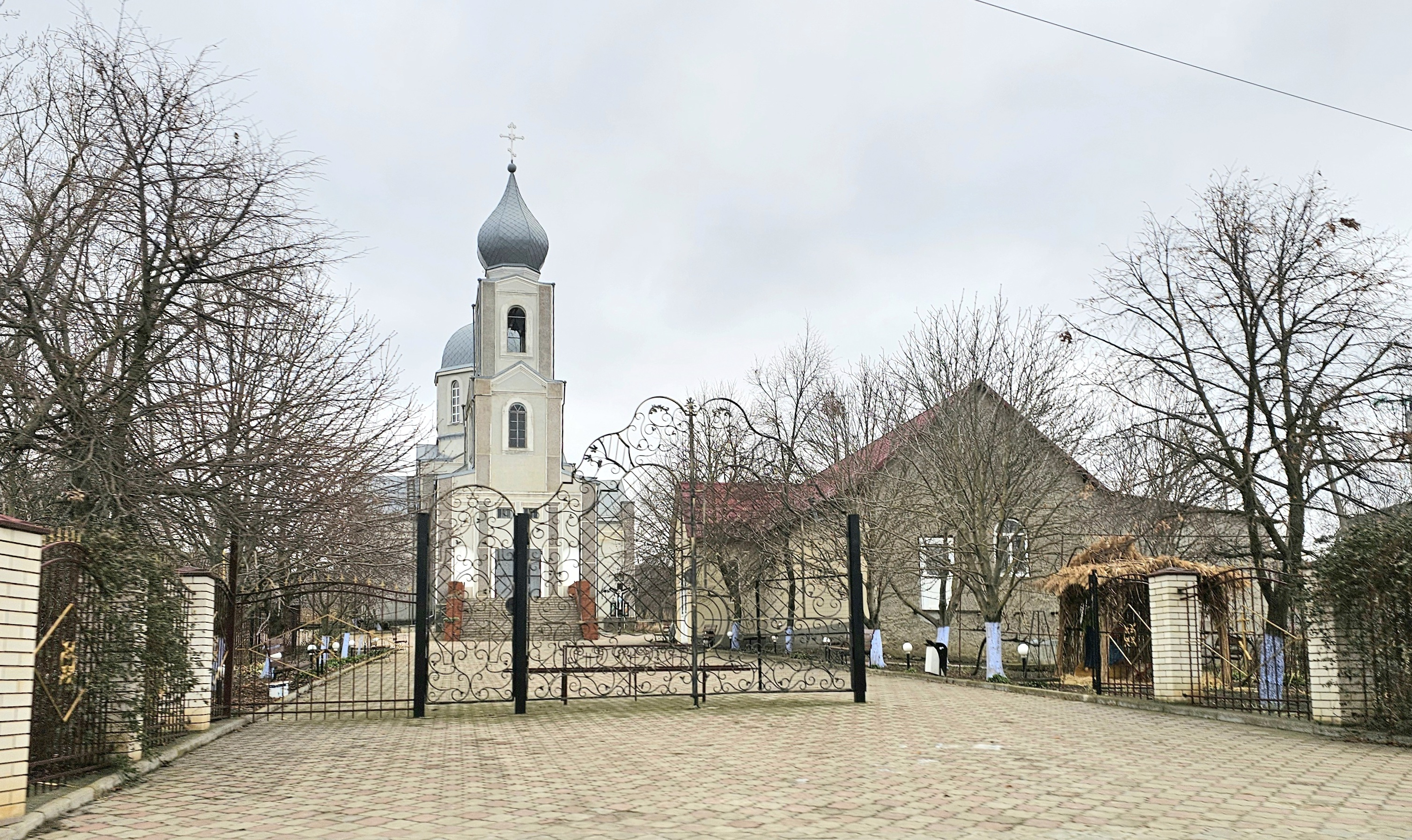
- St. Dumitru church in Beșghioz

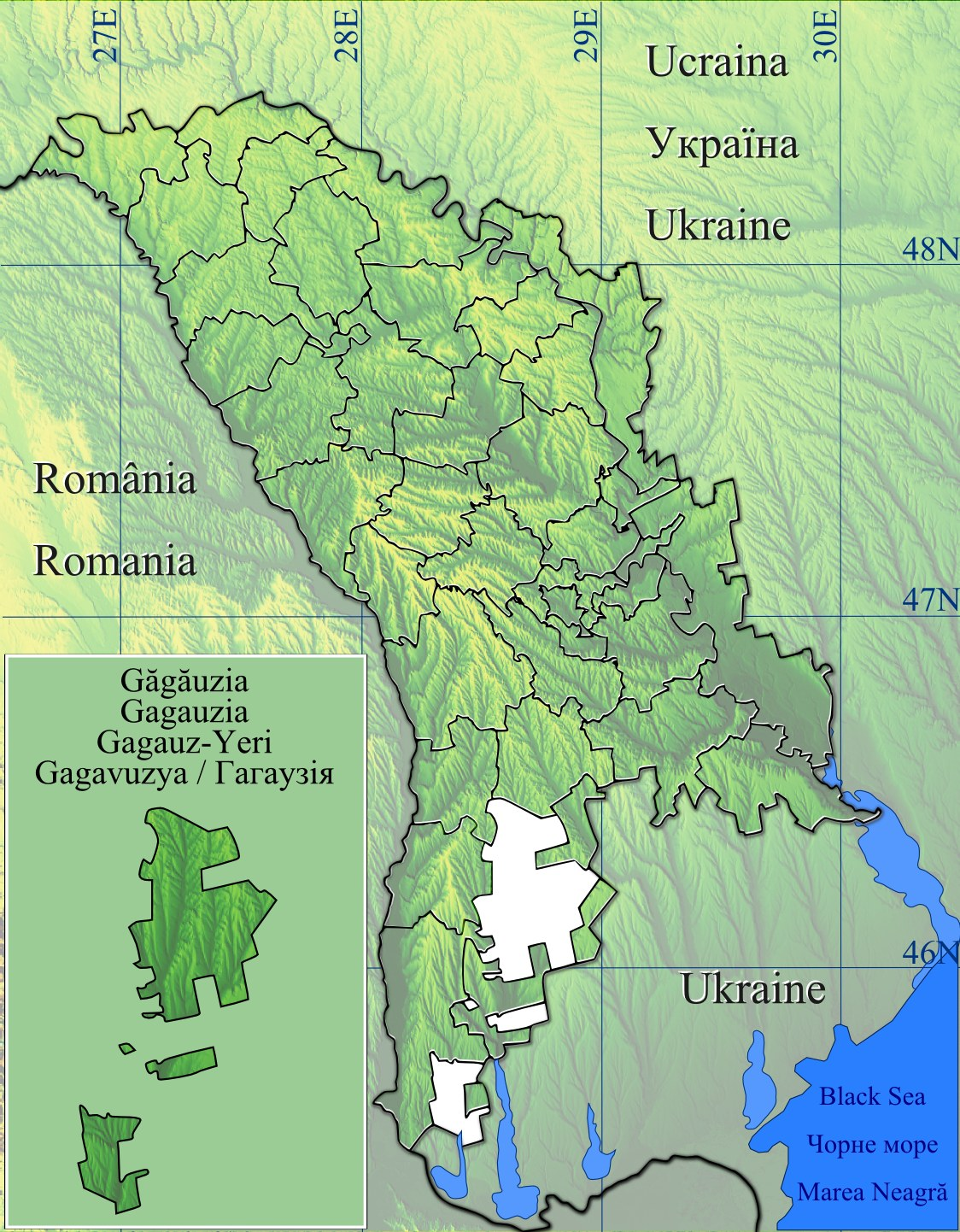
- Location of Beșghioz in Moldova
- Coordinates: 46°07′08″N 28°52′31″E
- Country: Moldova
- Autonomous Region: Gagauzia
- Founded: 1811

Government
  - Mayor: Fyodor Todorov

Population (2024)
  - Total: 1,940

Ethnicity (2024 census)
  - Gagauz people: 92.01%
  - Moldovans: 2.68%
  - other: 5.31%
- Time zone: UTC+2 (EET)
- Climate: Cfb
- Website: beshgioz.md

Beșghioz (Gagauz: Beşgöz) is a commune and village in the Ceadîr-Lunga district, Gagauz Autonomous Territorial Unit of the Republic of Moldova. According to the 2024 Moldovan census the commune has 1,940 people, 1,785 (92.01%) of them being Gagauz.

== History ==
Beshghioza, sometimes known as Copcui was founded in 1811–1812 by Gagauz settlers from Bulgaria and Romanians from Cahul. Between 1864–1872, the St. Dumitru church was built with contributions from the locals.

== Notable people ==
- Mihail Formuzal (born 1959), former governor of Gagauzia (2006–2015)
- Viktor Yefteni (born 1973), Ukrainian wrestler
