= Omsk State Technical University =

Coordinates: 55.0156°N 73.3569°E

- Омский государственный технический университет
- Motto: Your Ideas will Change the World
- Established: 1942
- Rector: Dmitriy Maevskiy, acting rector
- Academic staff: 800 professors, 8 institutions, 8 faculties
- Students: 15,000
- Location: Omsk, Russia
- Website: http://omgtu.ru/english/

University rankings

Regional – Overall
- QS Emerging Europe and Central Asia: 231-240 (2022)

Omsk State Technical University (OmSTU) in Omsk, Russia, is an educational institution in the Western Siberian Region. Omsk State Technical University (OmSTU) was established in 1942.

== Bachelor courses ==
- Mechanical Engineering
- Design-Technological Support
- Machine-Building Manufacturing
- Materials Science And Technology Of Materials
- Technological Machines And Equipment
- Refrigerating, Cryogenic Engineering And Life Support Systems
- Chemical Technology
- Energy And Resource-Saving Processes In Chemical Technology, Petrochemicals And Biotechnology
- Biotechnology
- Technospheric Safety
- Oil And Gas Business
- Technology Of Polygraphic And Packaging Production
- Heatenergy And Heat Engineering
- Electro-Power Engineering And Electrical Engineering
- Fundamental Informatics And Information Technologies
- Mathematical Security And Administration Of Information Systems
- Computer Science And Computer Engineering
- Applied Informatics
- Program Engineering
- Automation Of Technological Processes And Production
- System Analysis And Management
- Management In Technical Systems
- Information Security
- Radio Engineering
- Infocommunication Technologies And Communication Systems
- Design And Technology Of Electronic Means
- Electronics And Nanoelectronics
- Instrumentation
- Nanoin Engineering
- Building
- Power Engineering Engineering
- Applied Mechanics
- Operation Of Transportation And Technological Machines And Complexes
- Missile Complexes And Cosmonautics
- Standardization And Metrology
- Information Systems And Technologies
- State And Municipal Management
- Social Work
- Advertising And Communication With The Public
- Design
- Economy
- Management
- Human Resources Management
- Product Technology And Public Catering
- Technology Of Equipment Of Light Industry
- Design Of Equipment Of Light Industry
- Trading Business
- Equipment
- Service
- Tourism
- Hotel Business
- Rocket Complexes and Space Science

== Master courses ==
- Fundamental Computer Science and Information technologies
- Computer Science and Engineering
- Information Systems and Technology
- Applied Informatics
- Radio engineering
- Information and Communication Technologies and Communication Systems
- Design and technology of electronic means
- Electronics and Nanoelectronics
- Instrumentation
- Heat power and heat engineering
- Power and Electrical Engineering
- Power machinery
- Engineering
- Technological machines and equipment
- Applied mechanics
- Automation of technological processes and production
- Design and technological support of machine-building production
- Refrigerating, cryogenic equipment and life support systems
- Chemical Technology
- Energy and resource saving processes in chemical engineering, petrochemical and biotechnology
- Biotechnology
- Technosphere safety
- Oil and gas business
- Materials science and technology of materials
- Operation of transport and technological machines and systems
- Missile Systems and Astronautics
- Standardization and Metrology
- Nanoengineering
- The technology of printing and packaging production
- Economy
- State and municipal management
- Design

== PhD Courses ==
- Mathematics and Mechanics
- Physics and Astronomy
- Chemical sciences
- Earth sciences
- Computer Science and Engineering
- Electronics, radio engineering and communication systems
- Photonics, instrumentation, optical and biotechnical systems and technologies
- Elektro- and combined heat and power
- Nuclear Energy and Technology
- Machinery
- Physics and engineering science and technology
- Chemical
- Materials Technology
- Aviation, rocket and space technology
- Management in technical systems
- Economy
- Social sciences
- Linguistics and Literature
- Historical sciences and archeology
- Philosophy, Ethics and Religion
- Physical culture and sport
- Cultural

== Alumni ==
- Grigorii Uzun (born 1986), Moldovan businessman and politician
