= Gheorghe Tabunșcic =

Moldovan politician (born 1939)

Gheorghe Tabunșcic OR
- Georgiy Tabunşçik

1st Governor of Gagauzia
- In office 9 November 2002 – 29 December 2006
- Preceded by: Dumitru Croitor
- Succeeded by: Mihail Formuzal
- In office 19 June 1995 – 24 September 1999
- Succeeded by: Dumitru Croitor

Member of the Moldovan Parliament
- In office 20 March 2001 – 9 November 2002
- Succeeded by: Victor Jitari
- Parliamentary group: Party of Communists

Personal details
- Born: 1 August 1939 (age 87) Copceac, Kingdom of Romania
- Education: State Agrarian University of Moldova; Moldova State University

Gheorghe Tabunșcic (Gagauz: Georgiy Tabunşçik; born 1 August 1939) is a Moldovan politician of Gagauz ethnicity. He served as the first Governor of Gagauzia from 1995 to 1999 and then from 2002 to 2006.
