= Andrei Neguța =

Moldovan politician and diplomat

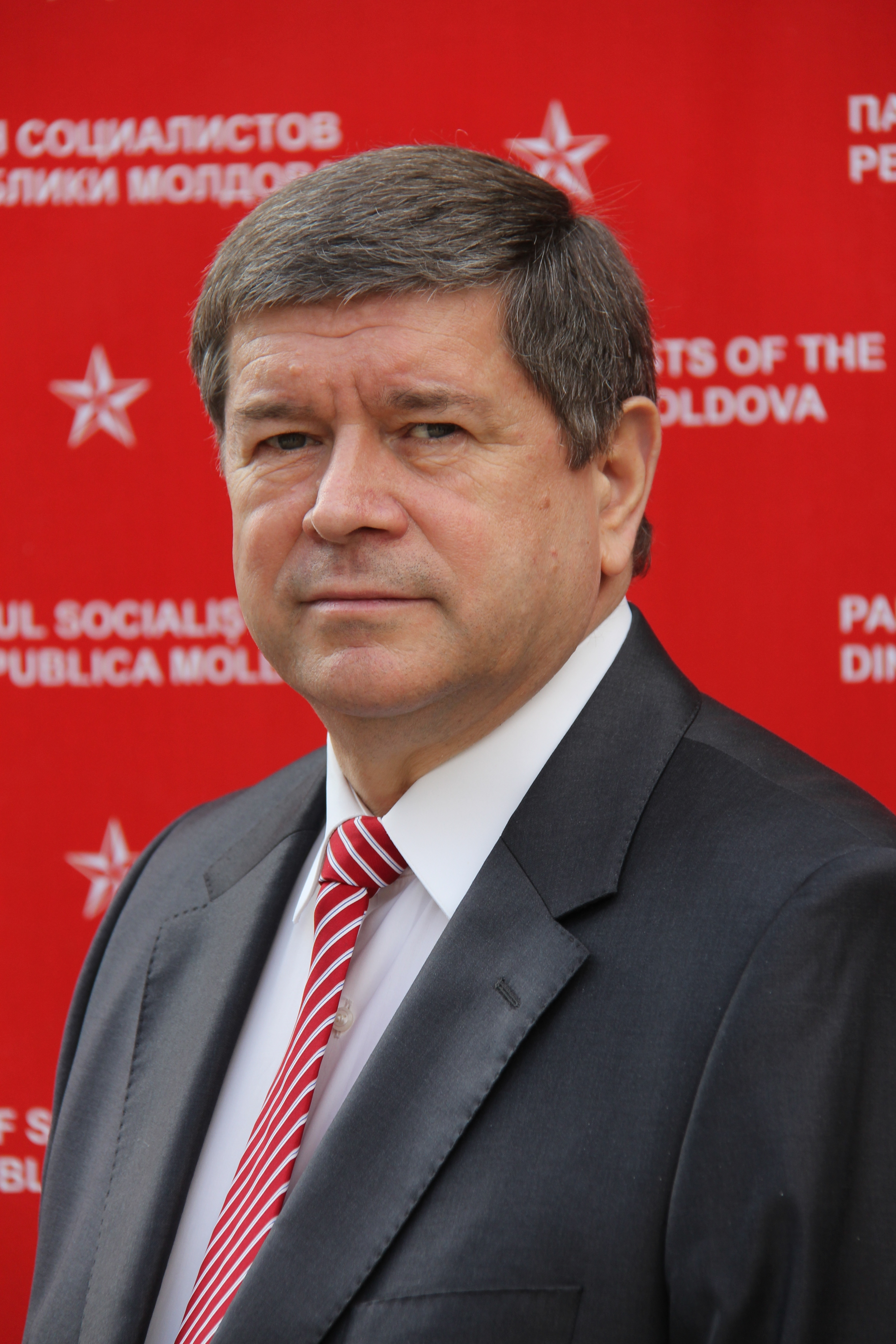
- Neguța in 2014

Moldovan Ambassador to Russia, Kazakhstan, Tajikistan and Kyrgyzstan
- In office December 2014 – 14 December 2020
- President: Igor Dodon
- Prime Minister: Pavel Filip; Maia Sandu; Ion Chicu
- Preceded by: Dumitru Braghiș
- Succeeded by: Vladimir Golovatiuc
- In office 26 December 2008 – 25 April 2012
- President: Vladimir Voronin; Mihai Ghimpu (acting); Vladimir Filat (acting); Marian Lupu (acting); Nicolae Timofti
- Prime Minister: Zinaida Greceanîi; Vitalie Pîrlog (acting); Vladimir Filat
- Preceded by: Vasile Sturza
- Succeeded by: Andrei Galbur

Foreign Policy Adviser to the President
- In office 26 December 2016 – 4 May 2017
- President: Igor Dodon
- Preceded by: Iulian Grigoriță
- Succeeded by: Aureliu Ciocoi

Member of the Moldovan Parliament
- In office 9 December 2014 – 26 December 2016
- Succeeded by: Oleg Cuciuc
- Parliamentary group: Party of Socialists
- In office 22 March 1998 – 14 November 2003
- Succeeded by: Mihail Poleanschi
- Parliamentary group: Party of Communists

Moldovan Ambassador to France, Spain and Portugal
- In office 19 November 2003 – 19 May 2006
- President: Vladimir Voronin
- Prime Minister: Vasile Tarlev
- Preceded by: Mihai Popov
- Succeeded by: Victoria Iftodi

Personal details
- Born: 18 July 1952 (age 74) Hîrbovăț, Moldavian SSR, Soviet Union
- Party: Party of Communists of the Republic of Moldova (until 2014)
- Spouse: Tatiana Neguța
- Children: 2 sons (Vadim and Chiril)
- Education: Moldova State University; Odessa State University
- Occupation: Diplomat, political scientist, politician, chemist

Andrei Neguța (born 18 July 1952) is a Moldovan politician and diplomat, former Ambassador of Moldova to Russia (2008–2012, 2017–2020).
