= Reghina Apostolova =

Moldovan politician (born 1951)

Member of the Parliament of Moldova
- In office 9 March 2019 – 16 October 2025
- Parliamentary group: Șor Party

Deputy Mayor of Orhei
- In office 7 July 2015 – 24 February 2019

Member of the Chișinău Municipal Council
- In office 23 May 1999 – 3 June 2007

Personal details
- Born: 15 September 1951 (age 75) Alexandrovsk, Irkutsk Oblast, Russian SFSR, Soviet Union
- Party: Șor Party (2016–2023)

Reghina Apostolova (born 15 September 1951) is a Russian-born Moldovan politician who was a member of the Parliament of Moldova from 2019 to 2025.

She was also a member of the Parliamentary Assembly of the Council of Europe from 2021 to 2024.

== Biography ==
Reghina Apostolova was born in Alexandrovsk, Irkutsk Oblast, on 15 September 1951.

Her parents were victims of Stalinist repression. Her family returned to Chișinău when she was four years old.

After completing school in 1969, Apostolova studied geography at the State Pedagogical Institute "Taras Shevchenko" in Tiraspol, graduating in 1975 and qualifying as a geography teacher. Between 1968 and 1972, she worked as a pioneer counsellor at Russian Middle School No. 14 in Chișinău (now Theoretical High School "Natalia Gheorghiu"). From 1972, she worked there as a geography teacher.

After graduating in 1975, she continued working at the same school, later serving as deputy principal from 1998 to 2007 and as principal from 2015 to 2019.

In December 1981, she became deputy director of the school. From July 1985 to February 2007, she served as director of Russian Middle School No. 14 in Chișinău, which later became Theoretical High School "Natalia Gheorghiu".

She was initially a member of the Party of Communists of the Republic of Moldova (PCRM) and entered local politics as a member of the Chișinău Municipal Council on 23 May 1999.

Between February and October 2007, she served as interim praetor of the Rîșcani sector of Chișinău.

After a short break beginning in June 2007, she returned to teaching and continued as a geography teacher until July 2015.

On 7 July 2015, she became Deputy Mayor of Orhei, responsible for construction and infrastructure.

In 2017, she joined the Șor Party, founded by Ilan Șor, and was elected chair of the party's Veterans Organization.

In the 2018 Chișinău mayoral election, she was the Șor Party candidate but was excluded after a court ruled that illegal foreign funding had been used in her campaign.

At the 2019 parliamentary elections, Apostolova was elected to the Parliament of Moldova on the Șor Party list. She also contested constituency no. 28 (Chișinău, Rîșcani), which she did not win; she entered Parliament via the party list system.

In Parliament, she was a member of the Commission for Social Protection, Health and Family.

From 2021 to 2024, she served as a member of the Parliamentary Assembly of the Council of Europe and as a substitute member of the Committee on Social Affairs, Health and Sustainable Development.

=== Accusations of fraud ===
According to RISE Moldova, Apostolova's name appeared in the Kroll audit report concerning the 2012–2014 bank fraud investigation known as the “theft of the billion.” The report stated that she held a 4.75% share in Unibank, one of the banks involved in the fraud worth 13.7 billion lei.

In May 2015, she became publicly known after the first Kroll report on the bank fraud was published. It alleged that Apostolova controlled 4.75% of shares in Unibank and had acquired them using funds borrowed from a British bank and a Moldovan bank. Ilan Șor, later convicted in connection with the case, was elected mayor of Orhei in 2015.

On 16 September 2019, the acting Prosecutor General requested that Parliament lift Apostolova's parliamentary immunity, which Parliament approved the same day. She and Marina Tauber were subsequently detained by the National Anticorruption Center on suspicion of involvement in the bank fraud case. Apostolova denied the allegations.

She was placed under judicial control in October 2019.

During hearings, she was hospitalised, where she was reported to have suffered a stroke.

On 2 October 2020, Apostolova and Tauber were removed from criminal prosecution and were no longer subject to charges in the case.

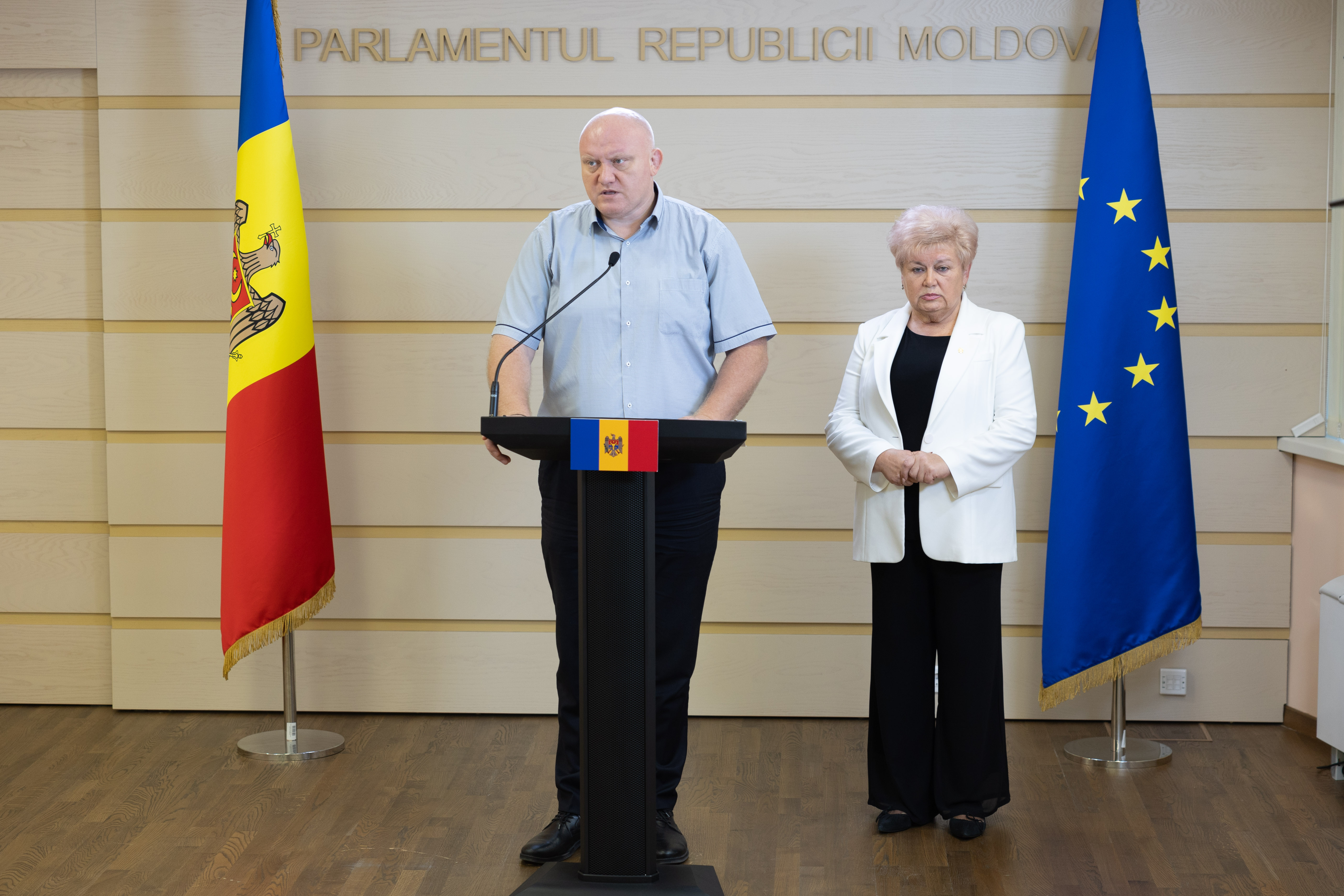
Apostolova in 2024

== Honours ==
In 2004, she was awarded the Order of Labour by President Vladimir Voronin for her services.

== Personal life ==
She is involved in parliamentary friendship groups with Canada, Switzerland, Russia, Georgia, and Ireland.

Her daughter, Irina, is the director of the "Natalia Gheorghiu" High School.
