= Ilia Uzun =

Moldovan-Gagauz politician (born 1967)

- Uzun in March 2018

Acting Governor of Gagauzia
- Incumbent
- Assumed office 5 August 2025
- Preceded by: Evghenia Guțul

Personal details
- Born: 16 May 1967 (age 59) Chioselia Rusă, Moldavian SSR, Soviet Union (now Moldova)
- Citizenship: Moldova; Bulgaria

Ilia Uzun (born on 16 May 1967) is a Moldovan politician who is currently the acting Governor of Gagauzia since 5 August 2025.

He had been the First Deputy Chairman of the Executive Committee of UTA Gagauzia.

He had also been the deputy of several convocations of the People's Assembly of Gagauzia (the region's parliament).

He was a veterinarian by education. According to autobiographical data, he lives in the village of Chioselia Rusă (Gagauz: Köseli Rus).

Uzun has pro-Russian views, and supports Moldovan pro-Russian fugitive oligarch Ilan Shor. He is currently under European Union sanctions.
