= Dumitru Croitor =

Moldovan politician (born 1959)

- Dmitriy Kroytor
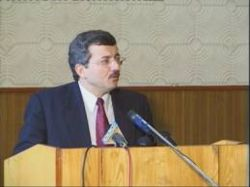
- Croitor in 2007

Moldovan Ambassador to Turkey, Lebanon, Egypt and Jordan
- In office 29 November 2019 – 27 June 2025
- President: Igor Dodon; Maia Sandu
- Prime Minister: Ion Chicu; Aureliu Ciocoi (acting); Natalia Gavrilița; Dorin Recean
- Preceded by: Igor Bolboceanu
- Succeeded by: Oleg Serebrian

Moldovan Ambassador to Switzerland; Permanent Representative to the United Nations Office at Geneva
- In office 6 February 2003 – 26 December 2005
- President: Vladimir Voronin
- Prime Minister: Vasile Tarlev
- Preceded by: Andrei Cheptine
- Succeeded by: Tatiana Lapicus

Governor of Gagauzia
- In office 24 September 1999 – 21 June 2002
- Preceded by: Gheorghe Tabunșcic
- Succeeded by: Gheorghe Tabunșcic

Deputy Minister of Foreign Affairs
- In office 15 June 1998 – 24 September 1999
- President: Petru Lucinschi
- Prime Minister: Ion Ciubuc; Ion Sturza
- Minister: Nicolae Tăbăcaru

Member of the Moldovan Parliament
- In office 22 March 1998 – 15 June 1998
- Succeeded by: Ilie Trombițchi
- Parliamentary group: For a Democratic and Prosperous Moldova

Personal details
- Born: 2 October 1959 (age 67) Ceadîr-Lunga, Moldavian SSR, Soviet Union
- Party: Democratic Party of Moldova
- Education: Moldova State University; Odesa National University of Economics

Dumitru Croitor (Gagauz: Dmitriy Kroytor; born 2 October 1959) is a Moldovan politician of Gagauz ethnicity. He served as the Governor of Gagauzia from 1999 to 2002.
