= Mihail Formuzal =

Moldovan politician of Gagauz ethnicity

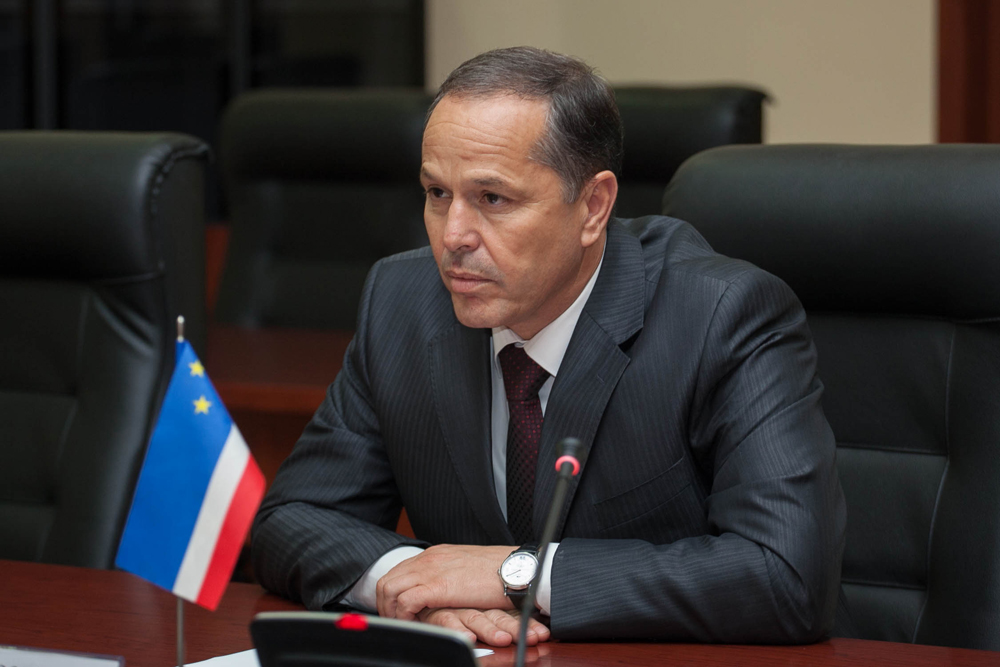
- Formuzal in 2013

Governor of Gagauzia
- In office 29 December 2006 – 23 March 2015
- Preceded by: Gheorghe Tabunșcic
- Succeeded by: Irina Vlah

Mayor of Ceadîr-Lunga
- In office 23 May 1999 – 29 December 2006

Personal details
- Born: 7 November 1959 (age 66) Beșghioz, Moldavian SSR, Soviet Union
- Citizenship: Moldova
- Party: Party of Regions of Moldova
- Other political affiliations: Our Party (2006–2011)

Military service
- Branch/service: Soviet Navy
- Years of service: 1977–1994
- Rank: Major

Mihail Formuzal (born 7 November 1959) is a Moldovan politician of Gagauz ethnicity, who was the governor of the Autonomous Territorial Unit of Gagauzia from December 2006 to March 2015.

== Early life and career ==
Mihail Formuzal was born on 7 November 1959, in Beșghioz, Ceadîr-Lunga, in what is now Gagauzia, into a large family of peasants. After graduating from elementary schools (1966–1977) of his native village, in 1977 he was enrolled in the military service, within the Soviet Navy.

In 1979, he joined the Frunze Higher Artillery Military School in Odessa (now the Odesa Military Academy) and graduated from it in 1983. He then worked for the Soviet Armed Forces in various leading positions and in November 1994, he resigned having the military rank of major.

== Gagauz politics ==
In 1995, Formuzal became Deputy Mayor of Ceadîr-Lunga. Between 1995 and 1998 he studied at Academy of Public Administration of the Government of Republic of Moldova.

In 1995 he was elected deputy mayor, and in 1999 Formuzal was elected as Mayor of Ceadîr-Lunga, later in 2003 being re-elected.

Mihail Formuzal had run for governor on 6 October 2002, but because of low turnout (of only 41.43% of voters) the elections were invalidated. He participated in a new round of elections on 20 October 2002. In this elections, Gheorghe Tabunşcic won 50.99% of the votes, being elected as a governor, and Mihail Formuzal obtained 43.22% of the votes.

Shortly, after Formuzal became the main rival of the PCRM's (Communist Party of the Republic of Moldova) candidate at the governor's election in 2002, a series of persecutions were initiated against Formuzal, 8 criminal cases for alleged economic crimes (corruption), committed as mayor of Ceadîr-Lunga were opened. He rejected the accusations as politically motivated.

In 2005, he became a member of the Republican Popular Party, and then, elected as a president of the Republican Council of the Party. He is the leader of the "Gagauzia Unita" Public Movement, a promoter of the most vehement and acute criticism addressed to the Communists Party of the Republic of Moldova and President Voronin. The Republican Popular Party accused the government of the Republic of Moldova of that time for usurping the state power.

== Elections of 3 December 2006 ==
On 3 December 2006, the new elections were held for the governor post of the Autonomous Territorial Unit of Gagauzia. These were due to the expiring of the four-year mandate of the Governor Gheorghe Tabunşcic. In the electoral race for the governor position there were registered four independent candidates: Gheorghe Tabunşcic, the actual governor, Alexandru Stoianoglo, the Deputy General Prosecutor of the Republic of Moldova, Nicolai Dudoglo, the Mayor of Comrat, and Mihail Formuzal, the Mayor of Ceadâr-Lunga.

In this election, Formuzal was supported by the pro-Russia parties alliance such as Ravnopravie-Patria Rodina. In the election campaign, Formuzal pledged to open commercial, economic and cultural representations of Gagauzia in Turkey, Russia, Bulgaria and Ukraine and to implement a project called "Bringing home the compatriots", targeting the Gagauz citizens who work abroad. Formuzal insisted to stipulate in the Constitution the Gagauzia's right to self-determination if the Republic of Moldova would in some way lose its status as a subject of international law.

"From our point of view, we have to put end to the speculations and to stop once and for all to perceive the Republic of Moldova as a state that would have a historical purpose only for a very short historical term. It was a mistake that the Parliament from the Chisinau did not introduce in the Constitution the article that would provide the right for self-determination to Gagauzia in case of loss of sovereignty by the Republic of Moldova."

— Mihail Formuzal to BBC Radio,

In the first round of elections, on 3 December 2006, Mihail Formuzal and Nicolai Dudoglo accumulated 33.89% and 31.40% respectively of votes. At the second round held on 17 December 2006, the mayor of Ceadir-Lunga, Mihail Formuzal, won the election and became the bashkan (governor of Gagauzia with 56.23% of the votes.

== Governor of Gagauzia ==
On 19 December 2006, Mihail Formuzal, the elected governor of Gagauzia, said that he intends to work constructively with the central authorities from Chișinău, which have been criticized several times during the campaign. Formuzal also mentioned that he will not criticize or blame his predecessors, but will end all the projects started during their mandate.

According to the legislation in force, after the announcement of the final official results by the Central Electoral Committee of Gagauzia, the mandate of the new governor must be validated by the Comrat Court of Appeal. Subsequently, by presidential decree, the new governor must be appointed as a member of the Government. Therefore, after almost four years of absence, a representative of the opposition has appeared in the Cabinet, even if he did not have a portfolio.

== Personal life ==
After his term as governor of Gagauzia finished, Formuzal emigrated to Germany, where he currently resides. Mihail Formuzal is married and has three children.
