= Vulcănești =

Vulcănești Valkaneş
- Municipality
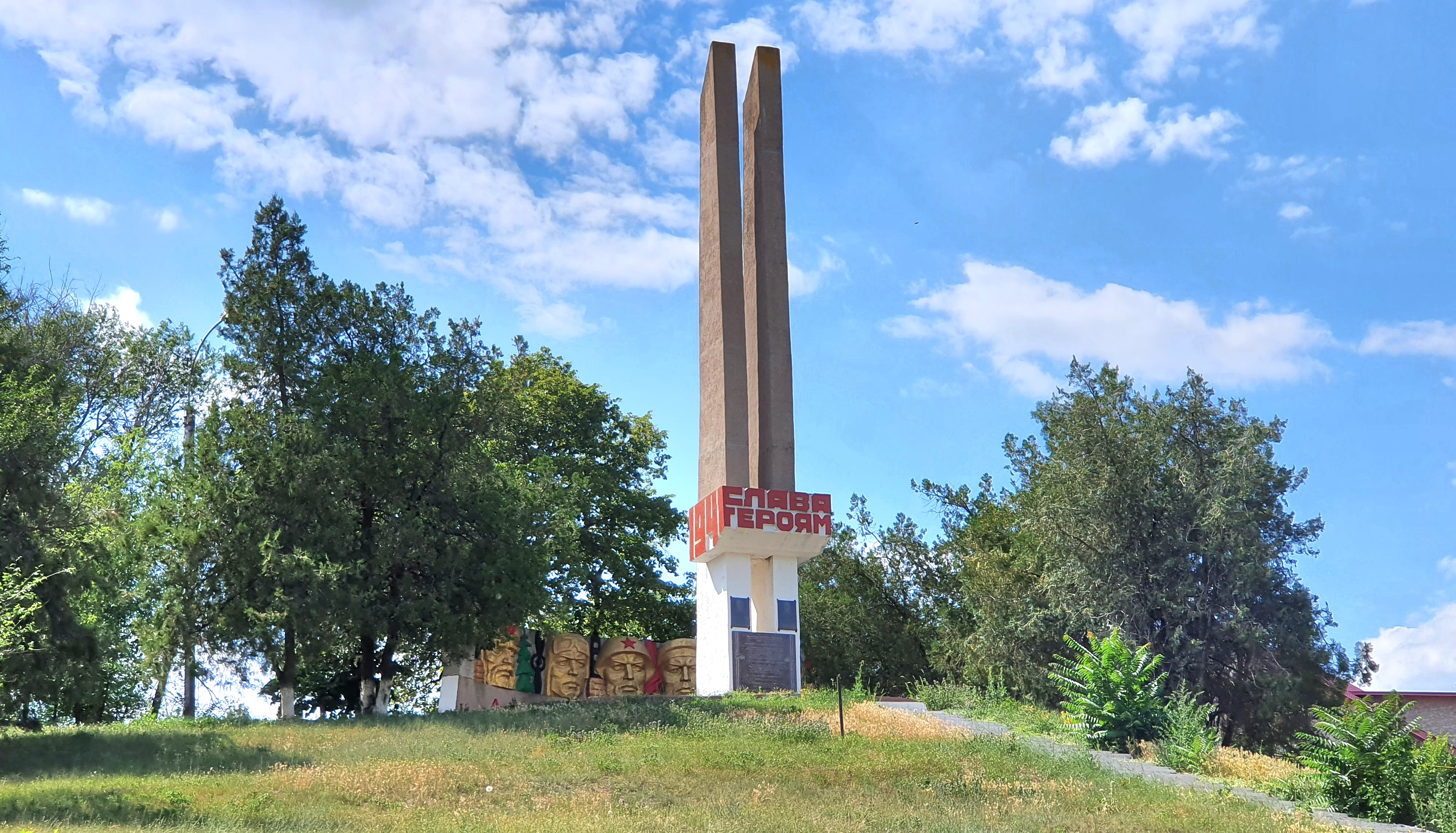
- Vulcănești WWII monument

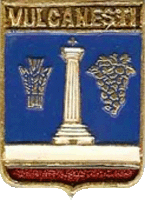
- Coat of arms

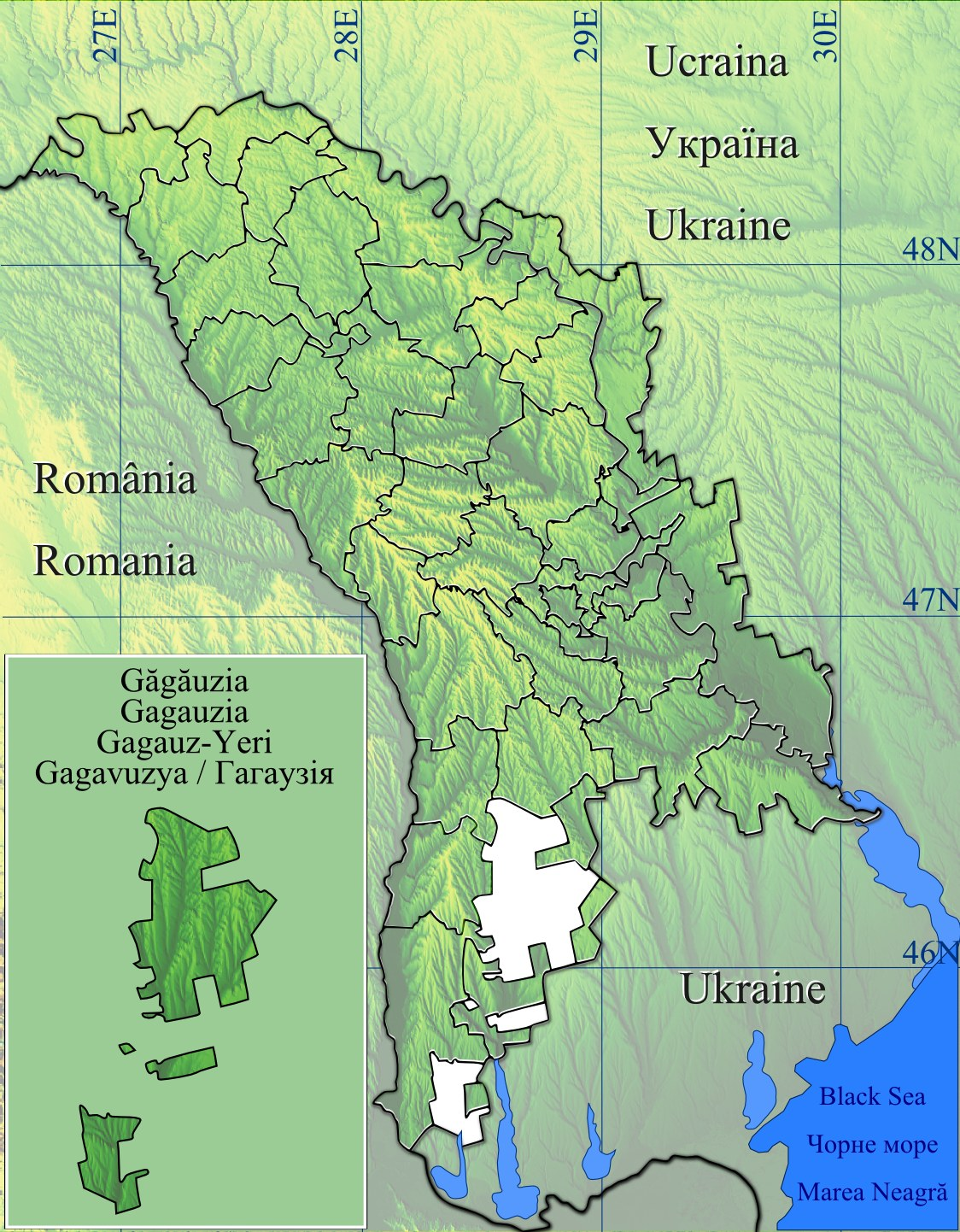
- Location of Vulcănești in Moldova Vulcănești (Moldova)
- Coordinates: 45°41′00″N 28°24′10″E
- Country: Moldova
- District: Gagauzia
- Founded: 1712

Government
  - Mayor: Nikolai Posmak

Area
  - Total: 15.26 km^{2} (5.89 sq mi)

Population (2024)
  - Total: 10,919
  - Density: 715.5/km^{2} (1,853/sq mi)

Ethnicity (2024 census)
  - Gagauz people: 70.17%
  - Moldovans: 13.3%
  - other: 16.53%
- Time zone: UTC+2 (EET)
  - Summer (DST): UTC+3 (EEST)
- Climate: Cfb
- Website: primariavulcanesti.com

Vulcănești (Romanian pronunciation: [vulkəˈneʃtʲ]; Gagauz: Valkaneş; Russian: Вулканешты, romanized: Vulkaneshty) is a city and district in Gagauz Autonomous Territorial Unit of the Republic of Moldova. The district of Vulcănești is the southern exclave of Gagauzia surrounded by the Cahul District (Moldova) and Odesa Oblast (Ukraine). One village-rail station also named Vulcănești, is administered by the city.

== History ==
The site of the city has been settled by humans for centuries, archaeological investigations have revealed a Neolithic sculpture that echoes Rodin's The Thinker.

The present day town was settled in the 18th century by Gagauz and Moldovan refugees from the Ottoman Empire.

The symbol of the town, the monument dedicated to the Battle of Cahul was erected in around 1849. Signifying a battle that took place in the proximate area in the Russo-Turkish War (1768–1774). The monument was designed by the Italian architect Francesco Boffo.

After the Union of Bessarabia with Romania in 1918 Vulcănești was integrated into the Cahul county in Romania. In 1930 the town was recorded to have 6,538 people, including 3389 men and 3149 women.

In 1965 the then village received the status of urban-type settlement and in 1995 city status.

== Demographics ==
According to the 2024 census, 10,919 inhabitants lived in Vulcănești, a decrease compared to the previous census in 2014, when 12,185 inhabitants were registered.

Ethnic composition of Vulcănești (2024)
Ethnic group	Population	% Percentage
Gagauz	7,662	70.17%
Moldovans (Note: There is an ongoing controversy regarding the ethnic identification of Moldovans and Romanians.)	1,452	13.3%
Russians	691	6.33%
Ukrainians	518	4.74%
Bulgarians	401	3.67%
Others	195	1.77%
Total	10,919	100%

Historical population
Year	Pop.	±%
1930	6,538	—
1970	13,637	+108.6%
1979	15,493	+13.6%
1989	18,230	+17.7%
2004	15,729	−13.7%
2014	12,185	−22.5%
2024	10,919	−10.4%

== Media ==
- Moldovan radio station Vocea Basarabiei broadcasts in Vulcănești on 106.7.

== International relations ==
=== Twin towns – Sister cities ===
Ceadîr-Lunga is twinned with:

- Zhukovka, Bryansk Oblast, Russia;
- Babruysk, Belarus;
- Lüleburgaz, Turkey;

== Notable people ==
- Aleksandra Albu (born 1990), Russian mixed martial artist
- Vladimir Pushkaryov (born 1973), Russian senator
- Grigorii Uzun (born 1986), Moldovan businessman and politician
