= Governor of Gagauzia =

Chief executive of Gagauzia, Moldova

- Gagauz: Gagauz Yeri başkanı Romanian: Guvernator al UTA Găgăuzia
- Coat of arms of Gagauzia

- Incumbent; Ilia Uzun; Acting since 5 August 2025
- General Department of Affairs of the Governor (Bashkan)
- Style: His Excellency
- Type: Head of government
- Member of: Cabinet of Moldova; Executive Committee of Gagauzia
- Residence: Comrat
- Appointer: Universal suffrage election (as governor) President of Moldova (as member of cabinet)
- Term length: Four years, renewable once (consecutively)
- Constituting instrument: Constitution of Moldova; Law on Special Legal Status of Gagauzia
- Inaugural holder: Gheorghe Tabunșcic
- Formation: 14 January 1995
- Website: gagauzia.md

The governor of Gagauzia (Gagauz: Başkan, pronounced [ˈbaʃkan]) is the highest political position in Gagauzia, an autonomous territorial unit of the Republic of Moldova. They chair the Executive Committee of Gagauzia and are an ex-officio member of the Cabinet of Moldova.

== Powers ==
The position is created by the 14th article of the law on the legal status of Gagauzia No. 344-XIII (December 23, 1994), which entered into force on 14 January 1995. All state authorities in Gagauzia are subordinate to the governor. The governor is elected by universal, equal, direct, secret and free suffrage on an alternative basis for a term of 4 years. One and the same person can be a governor for no more than two consecutive terms. They must be a citizen of Moldova over 35 years old and know the Gagauz language. The governor can issue decisions and decrees valid throughout the territory of Gagauzia. The governor can also sign or veto laws, appoint the members of the cabinet, and grant pardons when allowed to do so by the People's Assembly.

== List of governors ==
No.	Portrait	Name (Birth–Death)	Tenure			Political party	Notes
No.	Portrait	Name (Birth–Death)	Took office	Left office	Duration	Political party	Notes
1		Gheorghe Tabunșcic (born 1939)	19 June 1995	24 September 1999	4 years, 97 days	Party of Communists	Massive economic recession during tenure
2		Dumitru Croitor (born 1959)	24 September 1999	21 June 2002	2 years, 270 days	Independent (Note: Supported by the Movement for a Democratic and Prosperous Moldova.)	Forced to resign under pressure from the PCRM due to abuses of power
–		Valeriu Ianioglo (born 1957); Acting	21 June 2002	10 July 2002	19 days	Independent	Appointed interim governor by Croitor, rejected by the People's Assembly of Gagauzia
–		Ivan Kristioglo (born 1952); Acting	10 July 2002	29 July 2002	19 days	Independent	Appointed interim governor by the People's Assembly, tenure struck down by the Supreme Court of Justice of Moldova
–		Gheorghe Mollo (born 1939); Acting	29 July 2002	9 November 2002	103 days	Independent	Sought the expansion of the Romanian language in Gagauzia
3		Gheorghe Tabunșcic (born 1939)	9 November 2002	29 December 2006	4 years, 50 days	Party of Communists	Sought to rewrite the constitution of Moldova to create a federalized state. Lost his re-election bid.
4		Mihail Formuzal (born 1959)	29 December 2006	15 April 2015	8 years, 107 days	Party of Regions	Russophile, declared that Gagauzia has a right to self determination in the event of the unification of Moldova and Romania.
5		Irina Vlah (born 1974)	15 April 2015	19 July 2023	8 years, 95 days	Party of Socialists	Russophile, first female governor, granted a seat on the Supreme Security Council.
6		Evghenia Guțul (born 1986)	19 July 2023	5 August 2025	2 years, 17 days	Victory (Note: Initially elected as a candidate of the ȘOR party, but after the party was banned by the Constitutional Court on 19 June 2023, she became an independent Başkan. In 2024, she became secretary of the Victory Bloc during its foundation in Moscow.)	Russophile, elected as a member of the Șor Party until the party's outlawing, took office as an independent. Arrested while trying to flee the country due to corruption charges brought against her.
–		Ilia Uzun (born 1968); Acting	5 August 2025	Incumbent	1 year, 81 days	Independent	Appointed interim governor by the People's Assembly.

== See also ==
- Cabinet of Moldova
- President of Moldova
