= Shevchenkove, Izmail Raion, Odesa Oblast =

Rural locality in Odesa Oblast, Ukraine

Shevchenkove Шевченкове (Ukrainian)
- Village
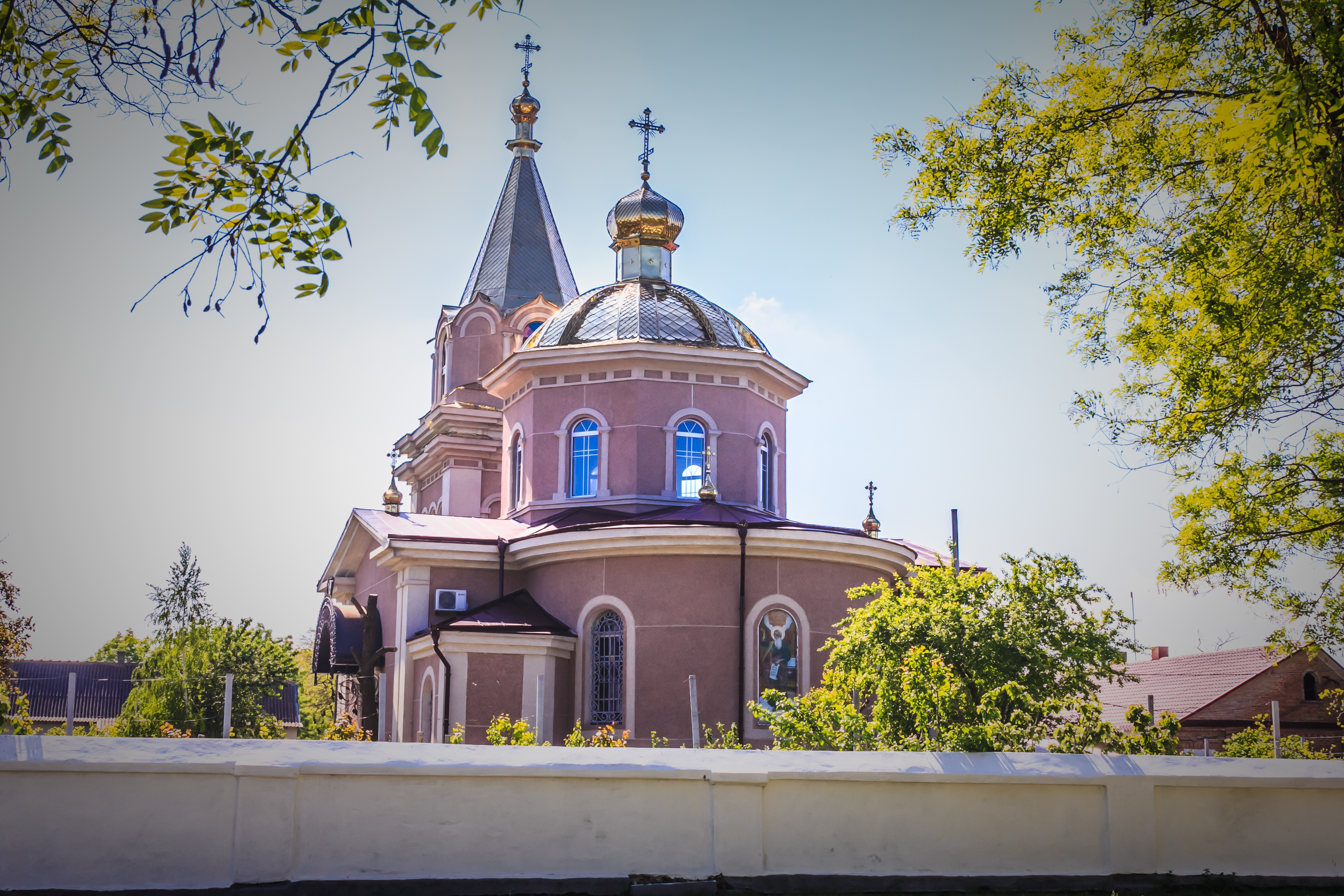
- Orthodox Saint John's Church, built in 1848

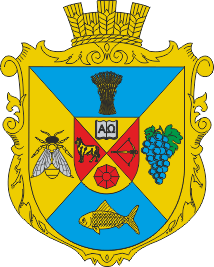
- Flag Coat of arms
- Interactive map of Shevchenkove
- Coordinates: 45°33′16″N 29°20′09″E
- Country: Ukraine
- Oblast: Odesa Oblast
- Raion: Izmail Raion
- Hromada: Kiliia urban hromada
- First mentioned: 1776
- Founder: 1790 as sloboda Karamahmed Historical affiliations: Ottoman Empire (1776–1812); Russian Empire (1812–1856); (Ottoman Empire) Principality of Moldavia (1856–1859); (Ottoman Empire) (Romania) United Principalities of Moldavia and Wallachia (1859–1862); (Ottoman Empire) (Romania) Romanian United Principalities (1862–1866); (Ottoman Empire) Principality of Romania (1866–1877); Principality of Romania (1877–1878); Russian Empire (1878–1917); Moldavian Democratic Republic (1917–1918); Kingdom of Romania (1918–1940); Soviet Union (1940–1941); Kingdom of Romania (1941–1944); Soviet Union (1944–1991); Ukraine (1991 – present)
- Named for: Taras Shevchenko, 1946

Government
  - Starosta: Oleksandr Ostapenko

Area
  - Village: 9,907 km^{2} (3,825 sq mi)
  - Land: 98.68 km^{2} (38.10 sq mi)
  - Urban: 6.37 km^{2} (2.46 sq mi)
- Elevation: 32 m (105 ft)

Population (2001)
  - Village: ▼5,625
  - Rank: 5th in Izmail Raion; 40th in Odesa Oblast
  - Density: 883.05/km^{2} (2,287.1/sq mi)
- Demonym(s): Shevchenkivtsi, Karahmedchany
- Time zone: UTC+2 (EET)
  - Summer (DST): UTC+3 (EEST)
- Postal code: 68332
- Area code: +380 (48) 433-7x-xx
- Climate: Dfa

Shevchenkove (Ukrainian: Шевче́нкове, IPA: [ʃeu̯ˈtʃɛnkowe]; Romanian: Caramahmet) is a village in Izmail Raion of Odesa Oblast of Ukraine. It belongs to Kiliia urban hromada, one of the hromadas of Ukraine. It is located 63 km (39 mi) from the raion center and 28 km (17 mi) from the Dzinilor railway station. The territory has a flat topography. A large cluster of water bodies in the Danube and Northern Black Sea basins is concentrated within a radius of 30 km (19 mi). According to the 2001 census, 5,625 inhabitants lived in the village, the territory is 6.37 km^{2} (2.46 mi^{2}), with the agricultural land measuring 98.68 km^{2} (38.10 mi^{2}), and by both indicators it is the largest village in the district.

The village was founded in 1790 as a Karamahmet sloboda of the Ottoman Empire. Renamed to Shevchenkove village in 14 November 1945 in honor of the poet-kobzar Taras Shevchenko. As of 17 July 2020, as part of the administrative reform in Ukraine, Shevchenkove became part of the Izmail Raion after the abolition of the Kiliia Raion.

== Places of interest ==
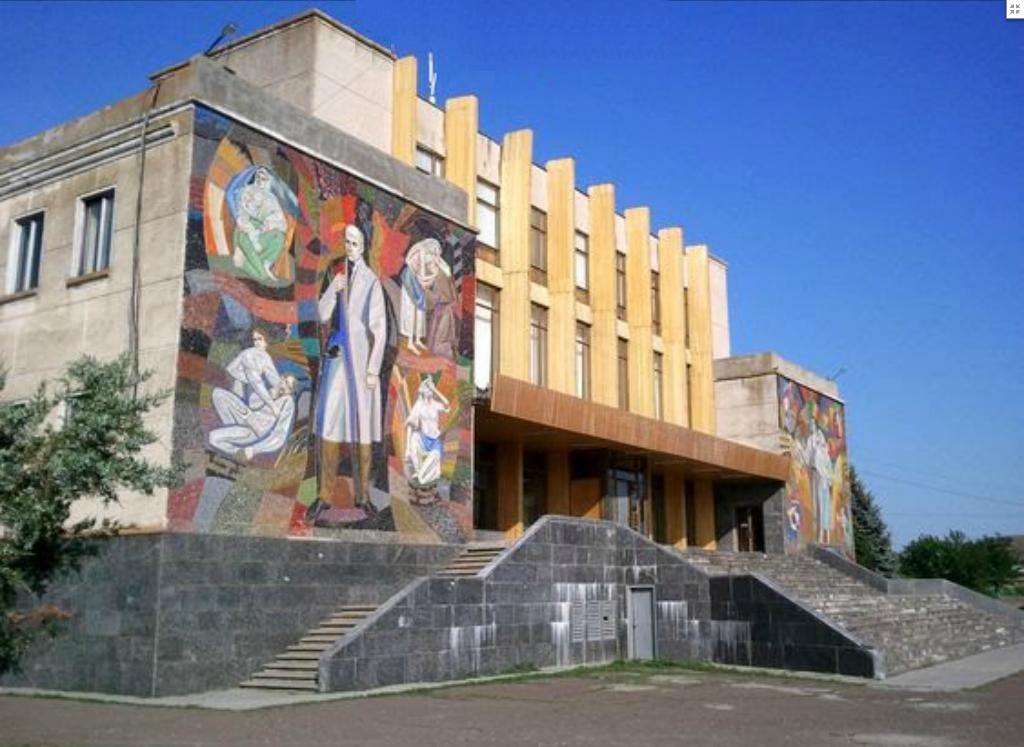
Palace of Culture

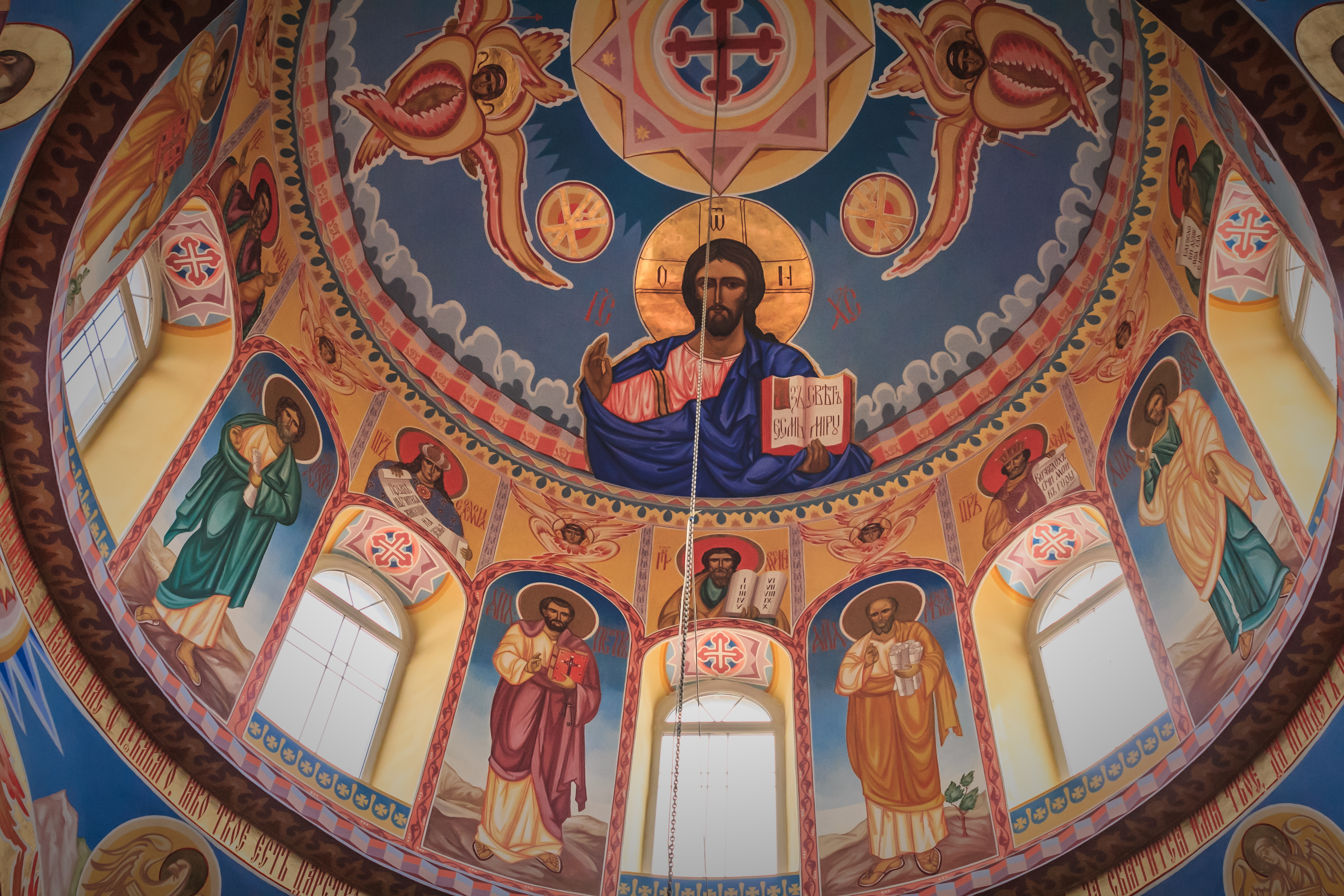
The dome of St. John's Church (since 2023 — Orthodox Church of Ukraine)

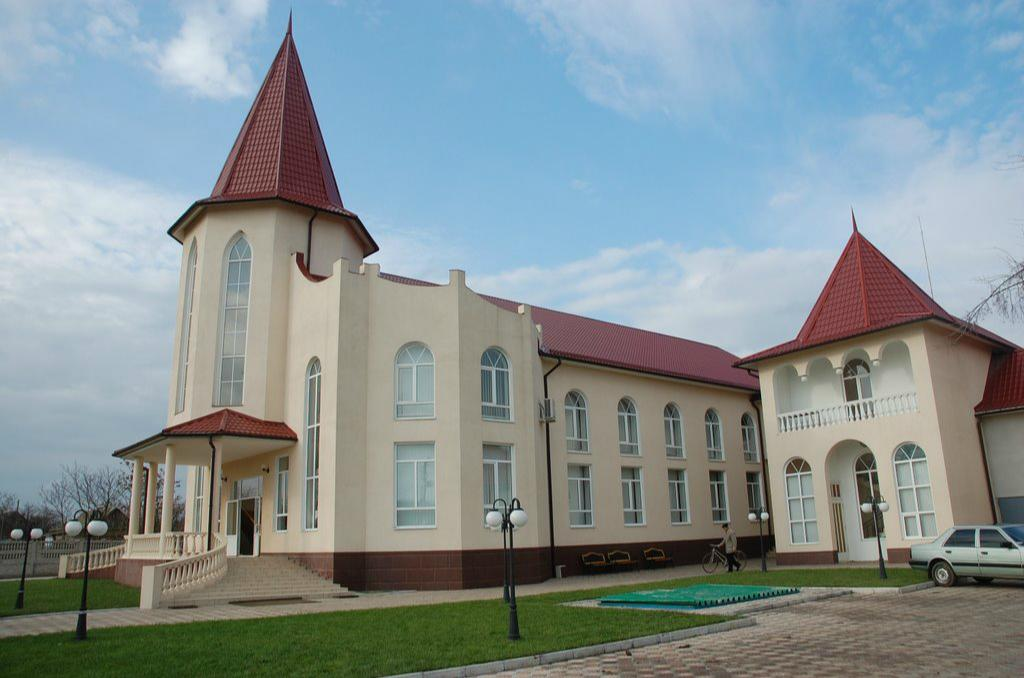
Facade of the Baptist Church, also called the House of the Gospel

== History ==
In 1776, next to the estate of the general of the Ottoman army, Kara Mahmet (Ottoman Turkish: Kara Mehmet), on the bank of the Techia stream, the first Ukrainian settlement appeared, founded by Cossack families from Zaporozhian Sich. 23 April [O.S. 12 April] 1790, the settlement was transformed into sloboda. In 1812, following the Treaty of Bucharest, became part the Bessarabian Oblast of the Russian Empire. In 1856, according to the results of the Treaty of Paris, village became part of states under Ottoman Empire suzerainty: Principality of Moldavia (1856–1859), United Principalities of Moldavia and Wallachia (1859–1862), Romanian United Principalities (1862–1866), Principality of Romania (1866–1878). Sloboda became a village and labor obligations and taxes were introduced for the inhabitants. In 1878, according to the Treaty of Berlin, the village returned to the Bessarabia Governorate of the Russian Empire, and the Principality of Romania gained its independence. In 1917, after the collapse of the Russian Empire, the village became part of the self-proclaimed Moldavian Democratic Republic, formed in the former Bessarabia Governorate. In 1918, the Kingdom of Romania carried out a military intervention into the Bessarabia Governorate (including the village) and the decision was made to join Bessarabia to the Kingdom of Romania. In 1940, according to the Molotov–Ribbentrop Pact, the Soviet Union annexed Bessarabia to the USSR, and the village belonged to the Ukrainian SSR. 1941, after the start of Operation Barbarossa, the village became part of the Kingdom of Romania again. In 1944, during the second Jassy–Kishinev offensive, the Soviet Army recaptured the village, and in 14 November 1945 it was renamed Shevchenkove. In 1991, after the dissolution of the Soviet Union, the village became part of Ukraine.

=== Administrative subordination ===
- Since 1873 — Karamahmet Volost, Akkermansky Uyezd, Bessarabia Governorate, Russian Empire
- Since 1904 — Karamahmet Volost, Izmailsky Uyezd, Bessarabia Governorate, Russian Empire
- Since 1925 — Karamahmed Commune, Chilia Nouă Plasă, Ismail County, Kingdom of Romania
- Since 1938 — Karamahmed Commune, Chilia Nouă Plasă, Ismail County, Ținutul Dunărea de Jos, Kingdom of Romania
- Since 28 June 1940 — The last king of Romania, Karol II, agreed to hand over Bessarabia to the USSR.
- Since 7 August 1940 — Karamahmet Volost, Akkerman Oblast, Ukrainian SSR, USSR
- Since 11 November 1940 — Kiliia Raion, Akkerman Oblast, Ukrainian SSR, USSR
- Since 19 July 1941 — Romanian military occupation zone of USSR
- Since 4 September 1941 — Karamahmed Commune, Kiliia Plasă, Chilia County, Bessarabia Governorate, Kingdom of Romania
- Since 24 August 1944 — Kiliia Raion, Akkerman Oblast, Ukrainian SSR, USSR
- Since 7 December 1940 — Kiliia Raion, Izmail Oblast, Ukrainian SSR, USSR
- Since 15 February 1954 — Kiliia Raion, Odesa Oblast, Ukrainian SSR, USSR
- Since 30 December 1962 — Izmail Raion, Odesa Oblast, Ukrainian SSR, USSR
- Since 4 January 1965 — Kiliia Raion, Odesa Oblast, Ukrainian SSR, USSR
- Since 24 August 1991 — Kiliia Raion, Odesa Oblast, Ukraine
- Since 12 February 2018 — Kiliia urban hromada, Kiliia Raion, Odesa Oblast, Ukraine
- Since 17 July 2020 — Kiliia urban hromada, Izmail Raion, Odesa Oblast, Ukraine

Until 17 July 2020, Shevchenkove belonged to Kiliia Raion. The raion was abolished in July 2020 as part of the administrative reform of Ukraine, which reduced the number of raions of Odesa Oblast to seven. The area of Kiliia Raion was merged into Izmail Raion.

== Population ==
Distribution of the population by mother tongue
1. Ukrainian (96.8%)
2. Russian (1.51%)
3. Romanian (0.73%)
4. Bulgarian (0.39%)
5. Romani (0.25%)
6. Others (0.27%)

According to the 2001 census, the majority of Shevchenkove's population was Ukrainian-speaking (96.85%).
