= Dmytrivka, Izmail Raion, Odesa Oblast =

Rural locality in Odesa Oblast, Ukraine

Dmytrivka Дмитрівка (Ukrainian) Dumitrești (Romanian)
- Village
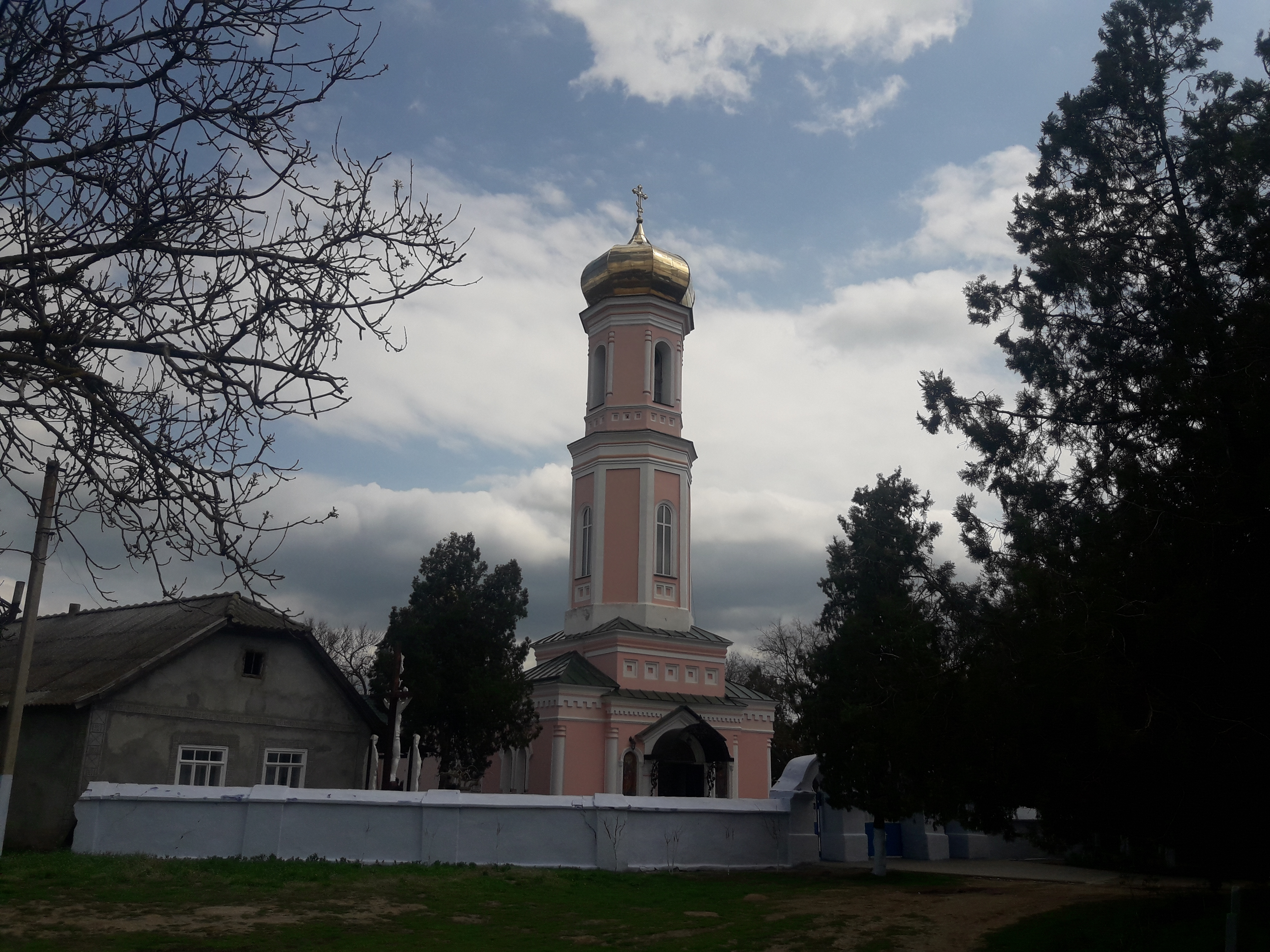
- Orthodox Saint Demetrius Church, built in 1860

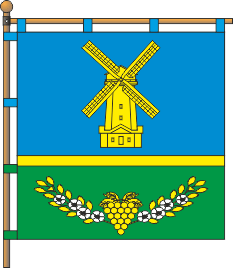
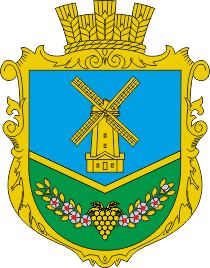
- Flag Coat of arms
- Interactive map of Dmytrivka
- Coordinates: 45°38′33.0″N 29°22′34.9″E
- Country: Ukraine
- Oblast: Odesa Oblast
- Raion: Izmail Raion
- Hromada: Kiliia urban hromada
- Founder: 1821
- Named for: Demetrius of Thessaloniki

Area
  - Land: 61.55 km^{2} (23.76 sq mi)
  - Urban: 2.56 km^{2} (0.99 sq mi)
- Elevation: 15 m (49 ft)

Population (2022)
  - Village: ▼2,538
- Time zone: UTC+2 (EET)
  - Summer (DST): UTC+3 (EEST)
- Postal code: 68330
- Area code: +380 (48) 433-7x-xx
- Climate: Dfa

Dmytrivka (Ukrainian: Дмитрівка; Romanian: Dumitrești) is a village in Izmail Raion, Odesa Oblast, Ukraine. It belongs to Kiliia urban hromada, one of the hromadas of Ukraine.

== History ==
About 600 Jews (supposedly from Odesa) were executed by Romanian gendarmerie on March 3, 1942.

Until 18 July 2020, Dmytrivka belonged to Kiliia Raion. The raion was abolished in July 2020 as part of the administrative reform of Ukraine, which reduced the number of raions of Odesa Oblast to seven. The area of Kiliia Raion was merged into Izmail Raion. There were 3,144 inhabitants in 2001, including 74 Ukrainian-speakers (2.35%), 2,941 Romanian-speakers (93.54%, including 2,901 who called the language Moldovan, or 93.54%, and 40 who called it Romanian, or 1.27%), 12 Bulgarian-speakers (0.38%), 49 Russian-speakers (1.56%), and 4 Gagauz-speakers (0.13%).
