= Vasylivka, Izmail Raion, Odesa Oblast =

Rural locality in Odesa Oblast, Ukraine

Vasylivka Василівка (Ukrainian)
- Village
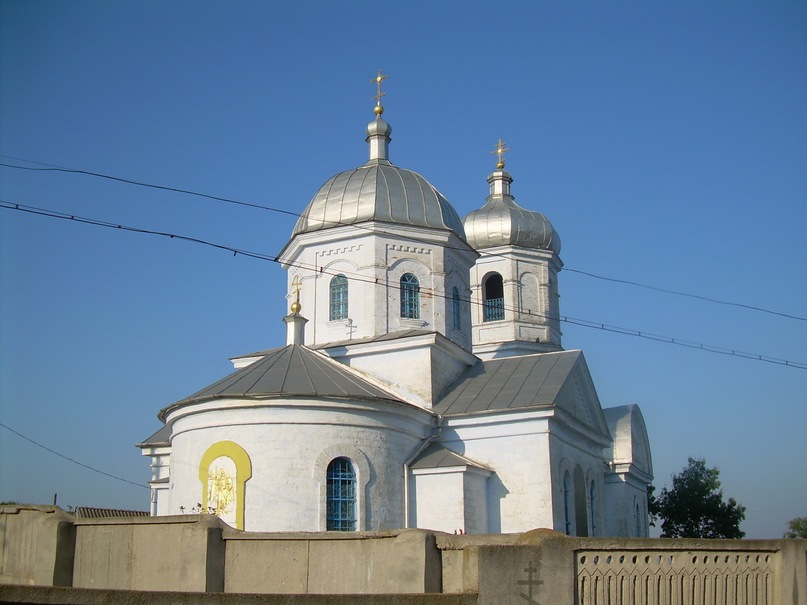
- Saint Michael the Archangel Church, built in 1863
- Interactive map of Vasylivka
- Coordinates: 45°31′20.4″N 29°10′00.5″E
- Country: Ukraine
- Oblast: Odesa Oblast
- Raion: Izmail Raion
- Hromada: Kiliia urban hromada
- Founder: 1775

Area
  - Land: 35.71 km^{2} (13.79 sq mi)
  - Urban: 2.26 km^{2} (0.87 sq mi)
- Elevation: 16 m (52 ft)

Population (2022)
  - Village: ▼991
- Time zone: UTC+2 (EET)
  - Summer (DST): UTC+3 (EEST)
- Postal code: 68323
- Area code: +380 (48) 433-8x-xx
- Climate: Dfa

Vasylivka (Ukrainian: Василівка; Romanian: Aprodul Purice) is a village in Izmail Raion, Odesa Oblast, Ukraine. It belongs to Kiliia urban hromada, one of the hromadas of Ukraine.

Until 18 July 2020, Vasylivka belonged to Kiliia Raion. The raion was abolished in July 2020 as part of the administrative reform of Ukraine, which reduced the number of raions of Odesa Oblast to seven. The area of Kiliia Raion was merged into Izmail Raion.
