= Lisky, Izmail Raion, Odesa Oblast =

Rural locality in Odesa Oblast, Ukraine

Lisky Ліски (Ukrainian)
- Village
- Location in Ukraine Lisky (Ukraine)
- Coordinates: 45°28′6″N 29°28′41″E
- Country: Ukraine
- Oblast: Odesa Oblast
- Raion: Izmail Raion
- Hromada: Kiliia urban hromada
- Founder: 1895

Area
  - Land: 83.19 km^{2} (32.12 sq mi)
  - Urban: 2.71 km^{2} (1.05 sq mi)
- Elevation: 0 m (0 ft)

Population (2022)
  - Village: ▼1,612
- Time zone: UTC+2 (EET)
  - Summer (DST): UTC+3 (EEST)
- Postal code: 68354
- Area code: +380 (48) 433-5x-xx
- Climate: Dfa

Lisky (Ukrainian: Ліски; Romanian: Liskî) is a village in Odesa Oblast, Ukraine. It belongs to Kiliia urban hromada, one of the hromadas of Ukraine.

Until 18 July 2020, Lisky belonged to Kiliia Raion. The raion was abolished in July 2020 as part of the administrative reform of Ukraine, which reduced the number of raions of Odesa Oblast to seven. The area of Kiliia Raion was merged into Izmail Raion.
