= Furmanivka, Odesa Oblast =

Rural locality in Odesa Oblast, Ukraine

Furmanivka Фурманівка (Ukrainian) Furmanca (Romanian)
- Village
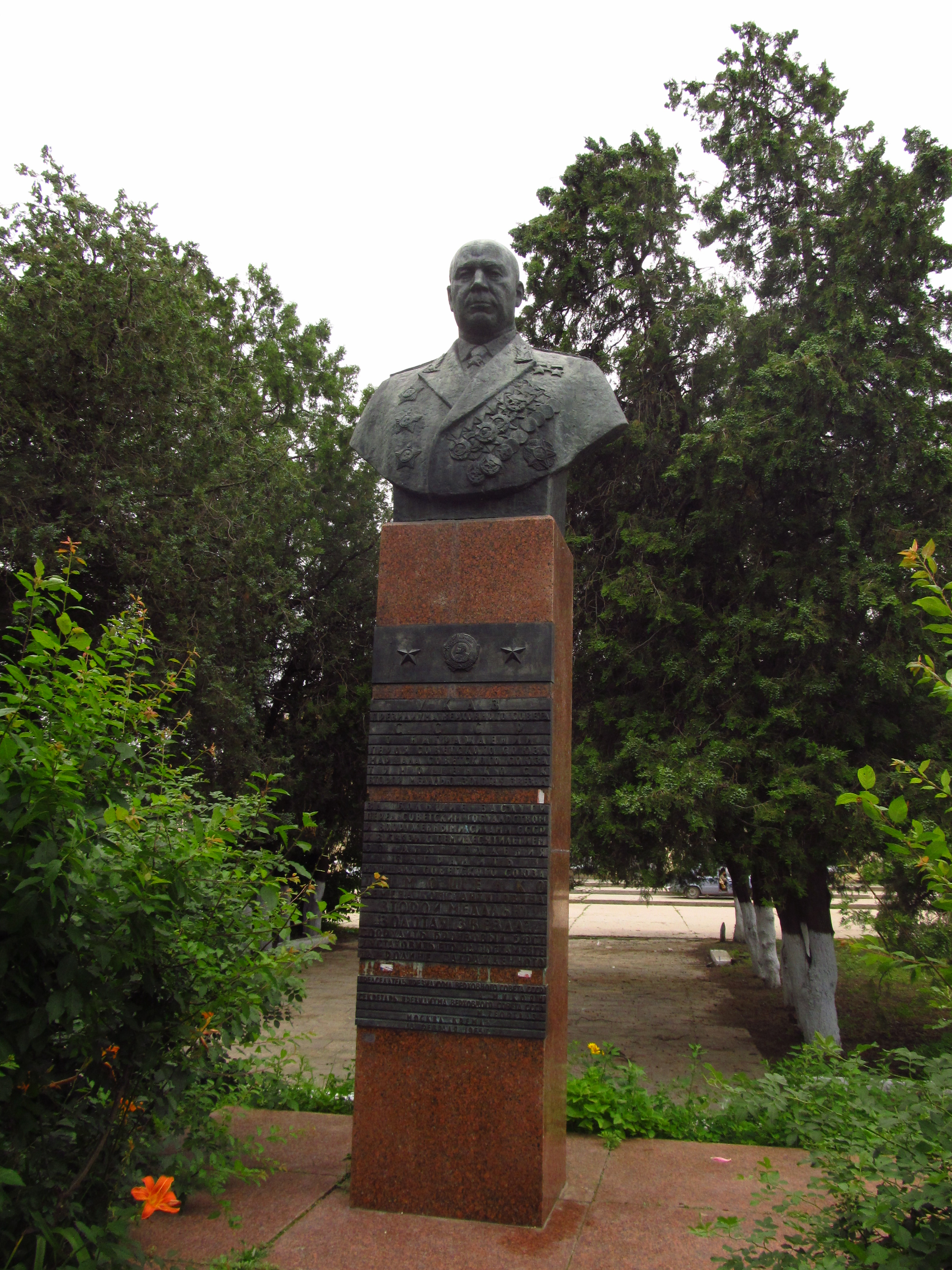
- Monument to Semyon Timoshenko
- Interactive map of Furmanivka
- Coordinates: 45°38′12.2″N 29°14′12.1″E
- Country: Ukraine
- Oblast: Odesa Oblast
- Raion: Izmail Raion
- Hromada: Kiliia urban hromada
- Founder: 1760

Area
  - Land: 108.93 km^{2} (42.06 sq mi)
  - Urban: 1.9 km^{2} (0.73 sq mi)
- Elevation: 8 m (26 ft)

Population (2022)
  - Village: ▼1,202
- Time zone: UTC+2 (EET)
  - Summer (DST): UTC+3 (EEST)
- Postal code: 68321
- Area code: +380 (48) 433-8x-xx
- Climate: Dfa

Furmanivka (Ukrainian: Фурма́нівка; Romanian: Furmanca) is a village in Odesa Oblast, Ukraine. It belongs to Kiliia urban hromada, one of the hromadas of Ukraine.

Until 18 July 2020, Furmanivka belonged to Kiliia Raion. The raion was abolished in July 2020 as part of the administrative reform of Ukraine, which reduced the number of raions of Odesa Oblast to seven. The area of Kiliia Raion was merged into Izmail Raion. In 2001, 76.7% of the inhabitants spoke Romanian as their native language, while 7.02% spoke Ukrainian and 12.81% spoke Russian.

Semyon Timoshenko, a Soviet military commander and Marshal of the Soviet Union, was born in the village.
