= Semyon Timoshenko =

Soviet military commander (1895–1970)

- Семён Тимошенко
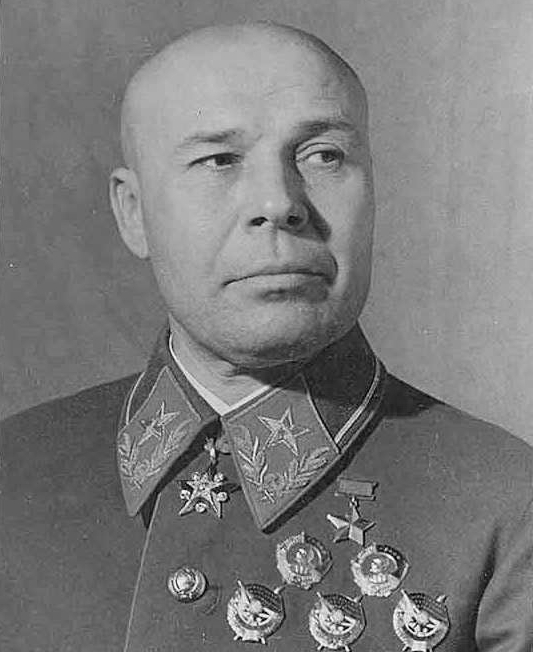
- Timoshenko in the 1940s

People's Commissar for Defense of the Soviet Union
- In office 7 May 1940 – 19 July 1941
- Leader: Joseph Stalin
- Premier: Vyacheslav Molotov; Joseph Stalin
- Preceded by: Kliment Voroshilov
- Succeeded by: Joseph Stalin

Personal details
- Born: 18 February 1895 Orman, Russian Empire
- Died: 31 March 1970 (aged 75) Moscow, Soviet Union
- Resting place: Kremlin Wall Necropolis
- Party: Communist Party (1919–1970)
- Awards: Hero of the Soviet Union (twice); Order of Victory; Order of Lenin (five times); Order of the October Revolution; Order of the Red Banner (five times); Order of Suvorov (three times); Cross of St. George

Military service
- Allegiance: Russian Empire (1914–1917); Russian Republic (1917); Soviet Russia (1918–1922); Soviet Union (1922–1970)
- Branch/service: Imperial Russian Army; Red Army; Soviet Army
- Years of service: 1914–1970
- Rank: Marshal of the Soviet Union
- Commands: Kiev Military District; Ukrainian Front (1939); Leningrad Military District; Western Front; Southwestern Front; Northwestern Front; Belorussian Military District
- Battles/wars: World War I; Russian Civil War; Polish–Soviet War; World War II; Winter War; Eastern Front

Semyon Konstantinovich Timoshenko (Note: Russian: Семён Константинович Тимошенко; Ukrainian: Семен Костянтинович Тимошенко, romanized: Semen Kostyantynovych Tymoshenko) (18 February [O.S. 6 February] 1895 – 31 March 1970) was a Soviet military commander, Marshal of the Soviet Union, and one of the most prominent Red Army commanders during the Second World War.

Born to a Ukrainian family in Bessarabia, Timoshenko was drafted into the Imperial Russian Army and saw action in the First World War as a cavalryman. On the outbreak of the 1917 Russian Revolution he joined the Red Army. He served with distinction during the Russian Civil War of 1917 to 1922 and the subsequent Polish–Soviet War of 1919 to 1921, which brought him into Vladimir Lenin's and Joseph Stalin's favour. Rapidly rising through the ranks, Timoshenko held several regional commands throughout the 1930s and survived the Great Purge of 1936 to 1938. He led the Ukrainian Front during the Soviet invasion of Poland in 1939. In early 1940, Timoshenko took over the command of Soviet troops in the Winter War in Finland from Kliment Voroshilov and turned the tide for the Red Army. In May 1940, he was named a Marshal of the Soviet Union and the People's Commissar for Defence. In the latter capacity, he took steps to modernise the Red Army and to prepare for a likely war with Nazi Germany.

On the outbreak of the Axis invasion of the Soviet Union in June 1941, Timoshenko was named chairman of the Stavka. Replaced by Stalin himself a month later, he went on to hold a series of important field commands in the following year. In late 1941, he organised a major counter-offensive in Rostov, which brought him international renown. His fortunes had faltered by mid-1942, in particular after the overwhelming Soviet defeat at the Second Battle of Kharkov, and he was relieved from the command of the newly formed Stalingrad Front. He was recalled later that year and appointed commander of the Northwestern Front, and as a Stavka representative he oversaw and coordinated the activities of several fronts in various times during the last phase of the war, including the Leningrad, Volkhov, and North Caucasus Fronts and the Black Sea Fleet, and the 2nd and 3rd Ukrainian fronts.

After the war, Timoshenko held commands in several Soviet military districts until his effective retirement in 1960. He died in 1970 at the age of 75.

== Early life ==
Born in Orman in the Akkerman uezd, Bessarabia Governorate of the Russian Empire (present-day Furmanivka, Odesa Oblast, Ukraine), to an ethnic Ukrainian family.

== Military career ==
=== First World War ===
In 1914, he was drafted into the Imperial Russian Army and served as a cavalryman on Russia's western front in the First World War. Upon the outbreak of the Russian Revolution in 1917, he sided with the Bolsheviks, joining the Red Army in 1918 and the Russian Communist Party (Bolsheviks) in 1919.

=== Russian Civil War ===
During the Russian Civil War of 1917–1923, Timoshenko served on various fronts. He fought against Polish forces in Kiev and then against Pyotr Wrangel's White Army and Nestor Makhno's Black Army. His most important encounter occurred at Tsaritsyn, where he commanded a cavalry regiment and met and befriended Joseph Stalin, who was responsible for the city's defense. The personal connection would ensure his rapid advancement after Stalin gained control of the Communist Party by the end of the 1920s. In 1920–1921, Timoshenko served under Semyon Budyonny and Kliment Voroshilov in the 1st Cavalry Army; Budyonny and Voroshilov became the core of the "Cavalry Army clique" which, under Stalin's patronage, would dominate the Red Army for many years. In April 1920, he was given command of the Sixth Division of the Red Cavalry, which was the first to attack the Polish army during the 'May offensive' launched by the Red Army during the Polish-Soviet War. On 29 May, the Sixth Division charged Polish trenches, taking heavy casualties for no gain, which convinced the Soviet commanders that charging trenches was pointless.

=== The 1930s ===
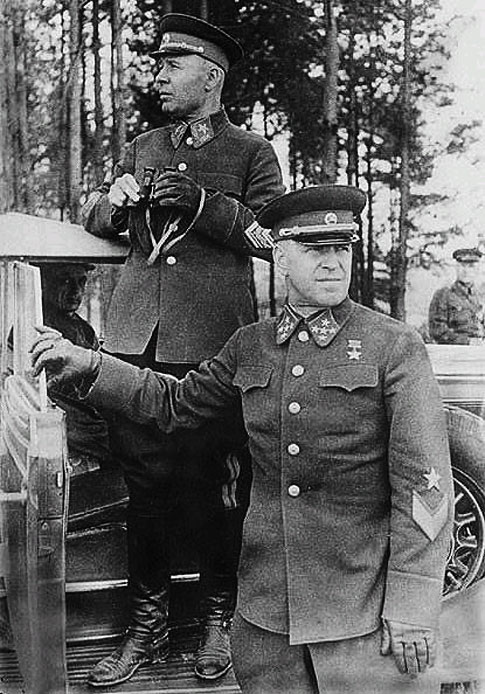
Timoshenko and Georgy Zhukov at the maneuvers of the Kiev Military District, 1940

By the end of the civil and Polish–Soviet wars, Timoshenko had become the commander of the Red Army cavalry forces. Thereafter, under Stalin, he became Red Army commander in Byelorussia (1933); in Kiev (1935); in the northern Caucasus and then Kharkov (1937); and Kiev again (1938). In 1939, he was given command of the entire western border region and led the Ukrainian Front during the Soviet invasion of eastern Poland. He also became a member of the Communist Party's Central Committee. Due to being a loyal friend of Lenin and Stalin, Timoshenko survived the Great Purge to become the Red Army's senior professional soldier.

=== World War II ===
==== The Winter War ====
In January 1940, Timoshenko took charge of the Soviet armies fighting Finland in the Soviet-Finnish War. This began the previous November, under the disastrous command of Kliment Voroshilov. Under Timoshenko's leadership, the Soviets succeeded in breaking through the Finnish Mannerheim Line on the Karelian Isthmus. His reputation increased, Timoshenko was made the People's Commissar for Defence and a Marshal of the Soviet Union in May, replacing Marshal Voroshilov as the Minister of Defence.

British historian John Erickson has written:

Although by no means a military intellectual, Timoshenko had at least passed through the higher command courses of the Red Army and was a fully trained 'commander-commissar'. During the critical period of the military purge, Stalin had used Timoshenko as a military district commander who could hold key appointments while their incumbents were liquidated or exiled.

Timoshenko was a competent but traditionalist military commander who nonetheless saw the urgent need to modernise the Red Army if, as expected, it was to fight a war against Nazi Germany. Overcoming the opposition of other more conservative leaders, he undertook the mechanisation of the Red Army and the production of more tanks. He also reintroduced much of the traditional harsh discipline of the Tsarist Russian Army.

In June 1940, Timoshenko ordered the formation of the Baltic Military District in the occupied Baltic states.

==== 1941–1942 ====
In the weeks before the German invasion of the Soviet Union, Timoshenko and Zhukov were worried by reports that German planes were crossing the Soviet border at least 10 times a day, and on 13 June, they asked Stalin for permission to put the troops on the western border on high alert, but were overruled because Stalin was convinced that there would be no German invasion before spring 1942.

General Ivan Boldin, deputy commander on the western front, recounted in memoirs published 20 years later that early in the morning of the invasion, on 22 June, when several towns in Belarus, including Grodno, were being bombed, aircraft destroyed on the ground, troops were being strafed, and German paratroopers were landing behind Red Army lines, Timoshenko rang him with an instruction that "no action is to be taken against the Germans without our knowledge ... Comrade Stalin has forbidden to open artillery fire against the Germans".

On 23 June, Timoshenko was named chairman of Stavka, the Soviet Armed Forces High Command. In July 1941, Stalin replaced Timoshenko as Defense Commissar and Stavka's chairman. At the same time, the Western Front was divided into three sectors, with Timoshenko put in command of the Central Front to supervise a fighting retreat from the border to Smolensk. The Northern Front was commanded by Voroshilov, and the Southwestern Front by Budyonny, both of whom were removed by Stalin for incompetence after only a few weeks. Timoshenko was transferred to Ukraine in September to replace Budyonny and restore order at the gates of Kiev. On 23 October, the Soviets made Timoshenko command the entire southern half of the Eastern Front and Georgy Zhukov command the northern half. In November and December 1941, Timoshenko organized major counter-offensives in the Rostov region, as well as carving a bridgehead into German defenses south of Kharkiv in January 1942.

In May 1942, Timoshenko, with 640,000 men, launched a counter-offensive (the Second Battle of Kharkov), which was the first Soviet attempt to gain initiative in the springtime war. After initial Soviet successes, the Germans struck back at Timoshenko's exposed southern flank, halting the offensive, encircling Timoshenko's armies, and turning the battle into a major Soviet defeat.

The fact that he was the most senior Soviet army officer with a front-line command during most of the first year after the German invasion turned Timoshenko, briefly, into an international celebrity, lionised in the US and UK in particular as a supposed military genius. According to an account written later in the war:

Marshal Timoshenko flared up like a shooting star of unusual brightness against a sky that was more than commonly dark, and faded just as swiftly and unexpectedly. From June 1941 to about July 1942, so famous was he that foreigners, notably the Welsh and Irish, attempted to inch under his halo by finding their blood in him. The Welsh said that Timothy Jenkins was the Marshal's ancestor who had migrated to Russia to work as a mechanic and marry a Ukrainian girl. The Hibernians told a similar story about a certain Tim O'Shenko. In June 1942, an American humorist wrote: "I am waiting to hear from the Poles, the Czechs, the Brazilians and the Greeks. Everybody wants to be a winner." But just then, Marshal Timoshenko began his descent from glory.

General Georgy Zhukov's success in defending Moscow during December 1941 had persuaded Stalin that he was a better commander than Timoshenko. On 22 July 1942, Stalin replaced Timoshenko with Vasily Gordov as Commander of the Stalingrad Front due to his failures up to that point in the war, making him "Chairman of the High Command". He was called back into service as overall commander of the Northwestern Front between October 1942 and March 1943.

==== 1943–1945 ====
Nonetheless, Timoshenko continued active military action in the later phase of the war. From March 1943, he was appointed as a representative of the Stavka to coordinate the actions of a number of fronts. He took part in the development and conduct of some operations. From March to June 1943, Timoshenko coordinated the Volkhov and Leningrad fronts during the battles at the Leningrad sector. By December 1943, he had coordinated the North Caucasian Front and the Black Sea Fleet, oversaw the liberation of the North Caucasus and Novorossiysk, the landing operation on the Kerch Peninsula, paving the way for the liberation of Crimea later. From February to June 1944, he oversaw the actions of 2nd and 3rd Baltic fronts, including the Starorussko-Novorzhevskaya operation. From August 1944 until the end of the war, he coordinated the actions of the 2nd, 3rd and 4th Ukrainian fronts.

Timoshenko was awarded his first Order of Suvorov, 1st class, due to the achievements in the Caucasus and the bridgehead in Crimea. After the Red Army liberated Chișinău on 25 August during the Jassy–Kishinev offensive, Timoshenko sent a telegram to Stalin that praised the achievement of the 2nd and 3rd Ukrainian fronts under his coordination and requested the promotion of their respective commanders, Malinovsky and Tolbukhin, to the rank of Marshal of the Soviet Union. The commanders were indeed promoted, and Timoshenko was also awarded another Order of Suvorov, 1st class. On 4 June 1945, Timoshenko was awarded the Order of Victory for his contributions in the war.

In 1945, Timoshenko attended the Yalta Conference. A rumor started in the Western press that Stalin had attacked Timoshenko, but this was later disproved.

Between 15 August 1945 and 15 September 1945, Timoshenko travelled alone to review the Starye Dorogi displaced persons camp where Auschwitz concentration camp survivors recuperated after their liberation. Later, the author Primo Levi (Prisoner 174517) wrote in The Truce of how the extremely tall Timoshenko "unfolded himself from a tiny Fiat 500A Topolino" to announce that the liberated survivors would soon begin their final journey home.

=== Postwar and death ===
After the war, Timoshenko was reappointed commander of the Baranovichi Military District (Byelorussian Military District since March 1946), then of the South Urals Military District (June 1946); and then the Byelorussian Military District once again (March 1949). In 1960, he was appointed Inspector-General of the Defence Ministry, a largely honorary post. From 1961 he chaired the State Committee for War Veterans.

Timoshenko died in Moscow on 31 March 1970 at the age of 75. He was honoured with a state funeral and was cremated on 3 April. The urn containing his ashes was buried in the Kremlin Wall Necropolis.

== Assessment ==
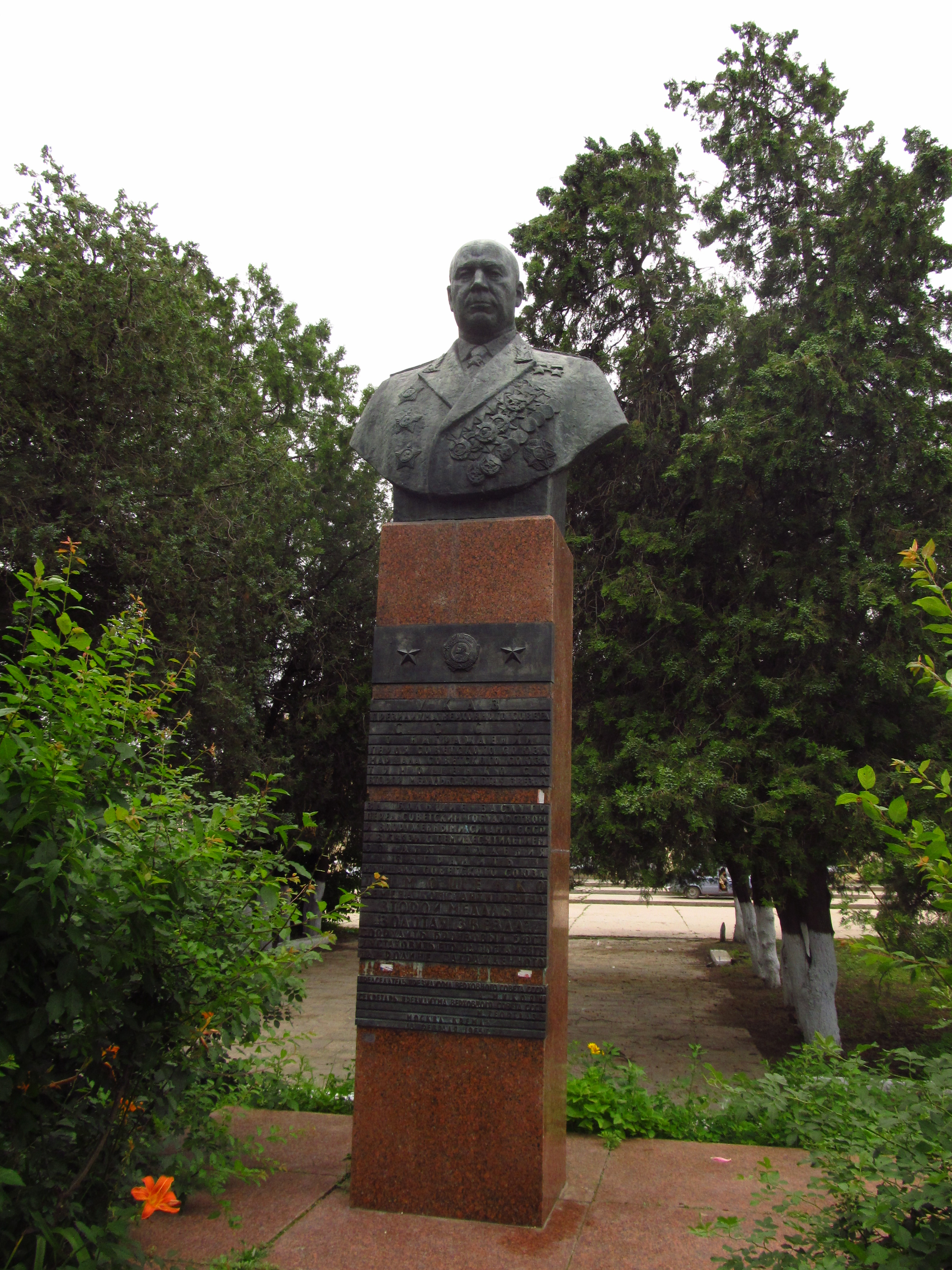
Monument to Timoshenko in Furmanivka, Ukraine, June 2014

Timoshenko was highly praised by his contemporary Marshal Georgy Zhukov. During a discussion with Stalin in 1941, Zhukov praised Timoshenko's conducts at Smolensk sector, claimed that he had done everything he could and gained the trust of the soldiers. After the war, Zhukov repeated his praise during an interview with Konstantin Simonov, claimed that Timoshenko was a strong-willed, educated and experienced military man. He was removed from the frontline duty not because of his capability, but mainly because people were upset with his defeat at Kharkov and Timoshenko himself did not attempt to curry favour with his superior.

General A.P. Pokrovsky, also in an interview with Simonov, gave a more multidimensional assessment of Timoshenko. Pokrovsky praised Timoshenko as a well-trained, hard-working commander and was proficient in military matters. However, Timoshenko had a deep distrust of the personnel of the Stavka, therefore he also worked with a separated group of trusted associates and double-checked the data gathered by both the Stavka group and his own group. Pokrovsky commented that Timoshenko's method was "abnormal" although his desire for accurate information was reasonable. Sergei Shtemenko in his memoirs also recounted Timoshenko's hostile attitude towards High Command's personnel including Shtemenko himself, however, their mutual relationship finally improved after some time working together.

There was a Marshala Tymoshenko Street in (the capital of Ukraine) Kyiv's Obolonskyi District. On 27 October 2022 the Kyiv City Council renamed this street to Levko Lukianenko Street.

== In popular culture ==
During the war with Poland, Isaac Babel rode with a cavalry unit commanded by Timoshenko, who was then aged 25, and who appeared as a named character in at least two of the stories that Babel wrote about his war experiences, one of which was originally published in Odessa under the title "Timoshenko and Melnikov". When the stories were republished, his name was changed to Savitsky, after Budyonny had denounced Babel's work as "slander" by a "literary degenerate". Babel's story My First Goose opens with this description:

Savitsky, the commander of the Sixth Division, rose when he saw me, and I was taken aback by the beauty of his gigantic body. He rose – his breeches purple, his crimson cap cocked to one side, his medals pinned to his chest – splitting the hut in two like a banner splitting the sky. He smelled of perfume and the nauseating coolness of soap. His long legs looked like two girls wedged to their shoulders in riding boots.

In Babel's The Story of a Horse, originally "Timoshenko and Melnikov", "Savitsky" is described as having been removed from his command, and living with a Cossack woman, and is accused of having taken a white stallion that belonged a rival officer, who tries in vain to get it back.

In the Warner Bros. cartoon Russian Rhapsody, a caricature of Adolf Hitler referred to Timoshenko as "that Irish general, Tim O'Shenko".

== Awards ==
=== Russian Empire ===
Cross of St. George, 2nd, 3rd and 4th class

=== Soviet Union ===
Hero of the Soviet Union (No. 241 – 21 March 1940, No. 46 – 18 February 1965)
Order of Victory (No. 11–6 April 1945)
Five Orders of Lenin (22 February 1938, 21 March 1940, 21 February 1945, 18 February 1965, 18 February 1970)
Order of the October Revolution (22 February 1968)
Order of the Red Banner, Five times (25 July 1920, 11 May 1921, 22 February 1930, 3 November 1944, 6 November 1947)
Order of Suvorov, 1st Class, Three times (9 October 1943, 12 September 1944, 27 April 1945)
Medal "For the Defence of Stalingrad"
Medal "For the Defence of Leningrad"
Medal "For the Defence of Kiev"
Medal "For the Defence of the Caucasus"
Medal "For the Defence of Moscow"
Medal "For the Capture of Budapest"
Medal "For the Capture of Vienna"
Medal "For the Liberation of Belgrade"
Medal "For the Victory over Japan"
Medal "For the Victory over Germany in the Great Patriotic War 1941–1945"
Jubilee Medal "Twenty Years of Victory in the Great Patriotic War 1941–1945"
Jubilee Medal "XX Years of the Workers' and Peasants' Red Army"
Jubilee Medal "30 Years of the Soviet Army and Navy"
Jubilee Medal "40 Years of the Armed Forces of the USSR"
Jubilee Medal "50 Years of the Armed Forces of the USSR"
Medal "In Commemoration of the 250th Anniversary of Leningrad"
Medal "In Commemoration of the 800th Anniversary of Moscow"
Honorary weapon – sword inscribed with golden national emblem of the Soviet Union (22 February 1968)

- Honorary revolutionary weapon – a sword with a nominal Order of the Red Banner (28 November 1920)

=== Foreign awards ===
Military Order of the White Lion "For Victory" (Czechoslovakia)
Golden Order of the Partisan Star (Yugoslavia)
Medal "30 Years of Victory in the Khalkhin-Gol" (Mongolia)

== Notes ==
Military offices
Preceded by Ivan Fedko	Commander of the Kiev Military District; 1938–1940	Succeeded by Georgy Zhukov
Preceded by Kirill Meretskov as Commander of the Leningrad Military District	Commander of the Northwestern Front; 1940	Succeeded by Mikhail Kirponos as Commander of the Leningrad Military District
Preceded by -	Chairman of the Soviet Armed Forces High Command; 1941	Succeeded by Joseph Stalin
Political offices
Preceded by Kliment Voroshilov	People's Commissar of Defense; 1940–1941	Succeeded by Joseph Stalin
