= Novoselivka, Izmail Raion, Odesa Oblast =

Rural locality in Odesa Oblast, Ukraine

Novoselivka Новоселівка (Ukrainian) Enichioi (Romanian)
- Village
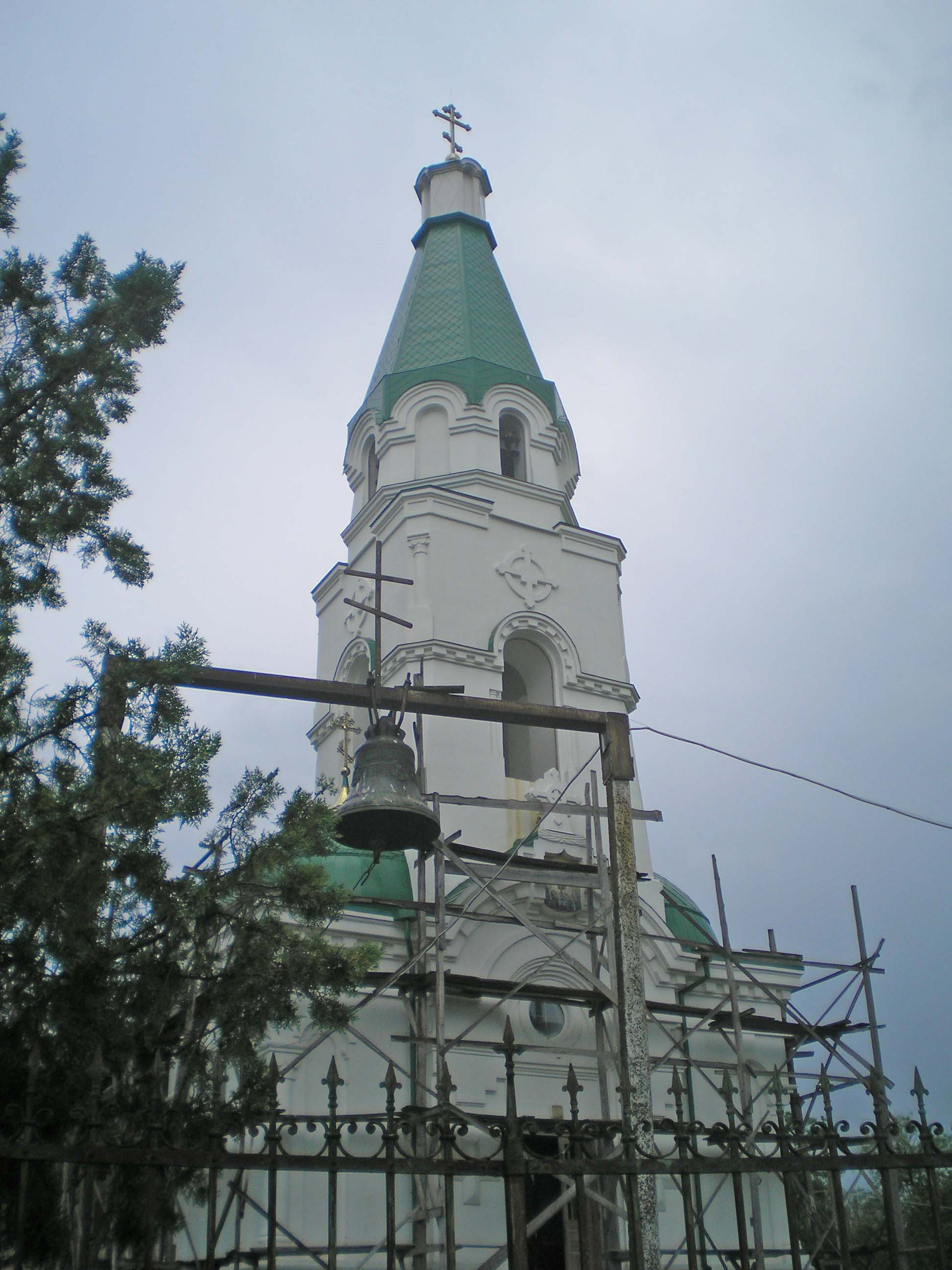
- Interactive map of Novoselivka
- Coordinates: 45°40′38.8″N 29°15′42.3″E
- Country: Ukraine
- Oblast: Odesa Oblast
- Raion: Izmail Raion
- Hromada: Kiliia urban hromada
- Founder: 1816
- Named for: 'New village', (new selo or new selivka) 1945

Area
  - Land: 67.13 km^{2} (25.92 sq mi)
  - Urban: 2.72 km^{2} (1.05 sq mi)
- Elevation: 14 m (46 ft)

Population (2022)
  - Village: ▼1,352
- Time zone: UTC+2 (EET)
  - Summer (DST): UTC+3 (EEST)
- Postal code: 68320
- Area code: +380 (48) 433-5x-xx
- Climate: Dfa

Novoselivka (Ukrainian: Новоселівка; Romanian: Enichioi) is a village in Izmail Raion of Odesa Oblast of Ukraine. It belongs to Kiliia urban hromada, one of the hromadas of Ukraine.
