= Chervonyi Yar, Izmail Raion, Odesa Oblast =

Rural locality in Odesa Oblast, Ukraine

Chervonyi Yar Червоний Яр (Ukrainian) Chitai (Romanian)
- Village
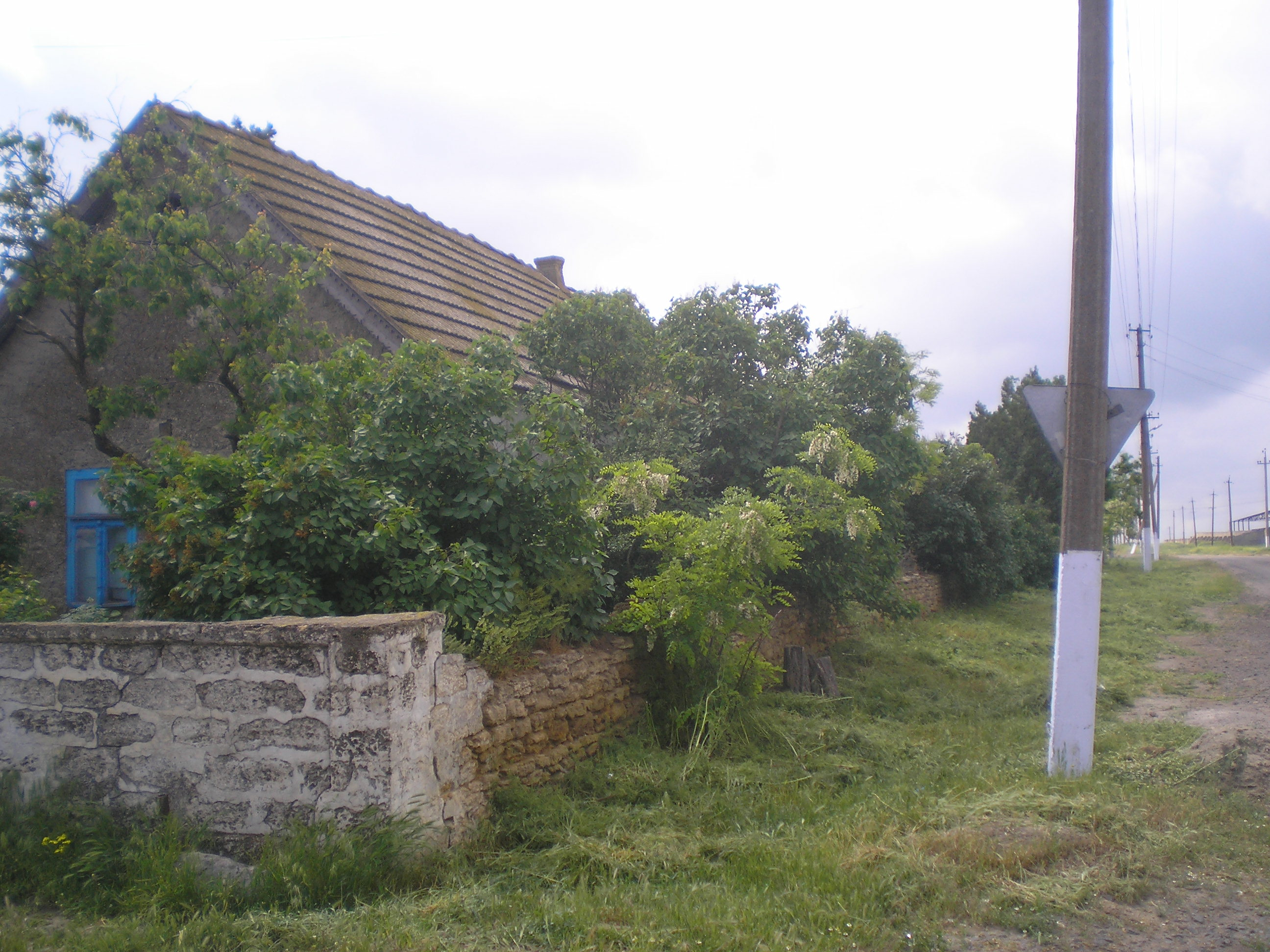
- Interactive map of Chervonyi Yar
- Coordinates: 45°35′03.1″N 29°12′32.7″E
- Country: Ukraine
- Oblast: Odesa Oblast
- Raion: Izmail Raion
- Hromada: Kiliia urban hromada
- Founder: 1807
- Named for: Red gully, 1945

Area
  - Land: 24.74 km^{2} (9.55 sq mi)
  - Urban: 1.08 km^{2} (0.42 sq mi)
- Elevation: 15 m (49 ft)

Population (2022)
  - Village: ▼662
- Time zone: UTC+2 (EET)
  - Summer (DST): UTC+3 (EEST)
- Postal code: 68322
- Area code: +380 (48) 433-0x-xx
- Climate: Dfa

Chervonyi Yar (Ukrainian: Червоний Яр; Romanian: Chitai) is a village in Izmail Raion of Odesa Oblast of Ukraine. It belongs to Kiliia urban hromada, one of the hromadas of Ukraine. According to the 2001 census, the majority of the population of the Chitai commune was Romanian-speaking (86.58%), with Ukrainian (7.95%) and Russian (4.72%) speakers in the minority.
