= Trudove, Izmail Raion, Odesa Oblast =

Rural locality in Odesa Oblast, Ukraine

Trudove Трудове (Ukrainian)
- Village
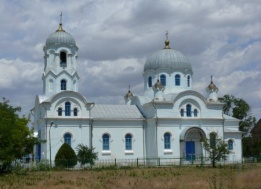
- Orthodox Saint Nicholas Church, built in 1897
- Interactive map of Trudove
- Coordinates: 45°37′12.2″N 29°23′57.9″E
- Country: Ukraine
- Oblast: Odesa Oblast
- Raion: Izmail Raion
- Hromada: Kiliia urban hromada
- Founder: 1805
- Named for: 'Labouring' (trud) 1945

Area
  - Land: 56.06 km^{2} (21.64 sq mi)
  - Urban: 2.64 km^{2} (1.02 sq mi)
- Elevation: 13 m (43 ft)

Population (2022)
  - Village: ▼1,201
- Time zone: UTC+2 (EET)
  - Summer (DST): UTC+3 (EEST)
- Postal code: 68332
- Area code: +380 (48) 433-3x-xx
- Climate: Dfa

Trudove (Ukrainian: Трудове; Romanian: Draculea) is a village in Izmail Raion of Odesa Oblast of Ukraine. It belongs to Kiliia urban hromada, one of the hromadas of Ukraine.

== Population ==
Distribution of the population by mother tongue
1. Ukrainian (84.1%)
2. Romanian (8.74%)
3. Russian (5.65%)
4. Bulgarian (0.47%)
5. Gagauzian (0.47%)
6. Romani (0.25%)
7. Others (0.21%)

According to the 2001 census, the majority of Trudove's population was Ukrainian-speaking (84.06%).
