= Kiliia urban hromada =

Coordinates: 45°34′N 29°17′E

Kiliia urban hromada Кілійська міська громада
- Hromada
- Interactive map of Kiliia urban hromada
- Country: Ukraine
- Oblast: Odesa Oblast
- Raion: Izmail Raion
- Admin. center: Kiliia

Area
  - Total: 713.7 km^{2} (275.6 sq mi)

Population (2022)
  - Total: 33,699
  - Density: 47.22/km^{2} (122.3/sq mi)
- CATOTTG code: UA51080050000022808
- Settlements: 11
- Cities: 1
- Villages: 10
- Website: kiliyska-gromada.gov.ua

Kiliia urban hromada (Ukrainian: Кілійська міська громада) is a hromada (municipality) in Ukraine, in Izmail Raion of Odesa Oblast. The administrative center is the city of Kiliia. Population: 33,699 (2022 estimate)

It was formed by the decision of the Odesa Oblast Council of February 12, 2018 as part of the administrative and territorial reform of 2015–2020 as a result of the voluntary merger of the Kiliia City Council with the Liskivska and Shevchenkivska Village Councils. At that time it was called Kiliia united urban territorial hromada (Ukrainian: Кілійська міська об'єднана територіальна громада). By order Government of Ukraine of June 12, 2020, Chervonoiarska, Dmytrivska, Furmanivska, Novoselivska, Trudivska and Vasylivska Village Councils were added to the composition of the hromada. Until 18 July 2020, the area of hromada belonged to Kiliia Raion and after its abolished was merged into Izmail Raion. The Kiliia urban hromada had 40,408 inhabitants in 2001, out of which 5,847 spoke Romanian (14.47%), 14,628 spoke Russian (36.20%), 17,816 spoke Ukrainian (44.09%), 578 spoke Gagauz (1.43%), and 1,254 spoke Bulgarian (3.1%).

== Administrative division ==
The hromada consists of 1 city (Kiliia) and 10 villages:

- Shevchenkivskyi Starostyn District No.1 (including Pomazany)
- Liskivskyi Starostyn District No.2
- Vasylivskyi Starostyn District No.3
- Dmytrivskyi Starostyn District No.4
- Novoselivskyi Starostyn District No.5
- Trudivskyi Starostyn District No.6 (including Mykolaivka)
- Furmanivskyi Starostyn District No.7
- Chervonoiarskyi Starostyn District No.8
