= Oleksandr Dubovoy =

Ukrainian politician

- Олександр Дубовой
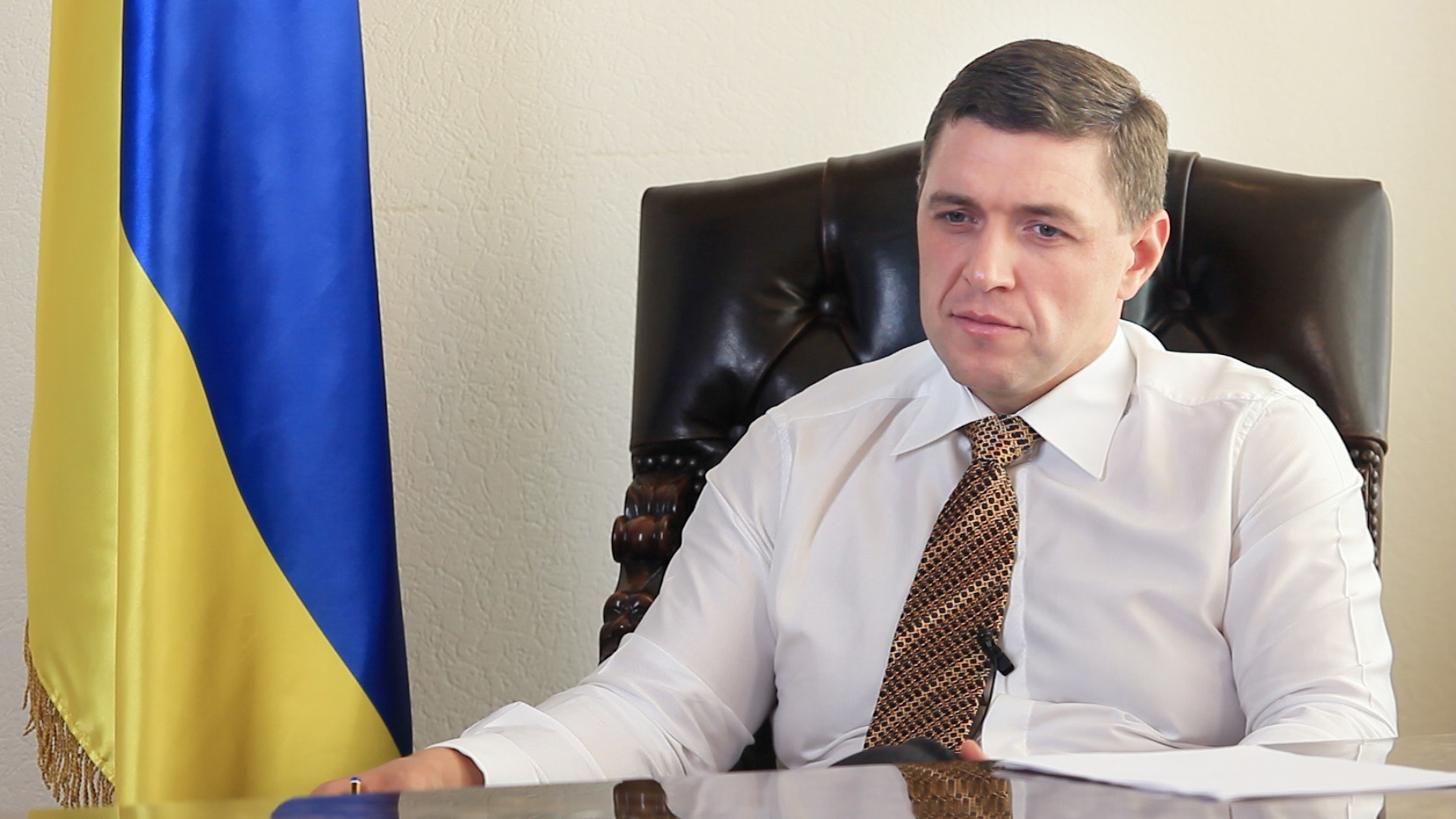
- Dubovoy in 2011

People's Deputy of Ukraine
- In office 23 November 2007 – 27 November 2014
- Constituency: Yulia Tymoshenko Bloc, No. 128 (2007–2012); Batkivshchyna, No. 64 (2012–2014)

Personal details
- Born: 11 March 1976 (age 50) Kiliya, Ukrainian SSR, Soviet Union (now Ukraine)
- Party: Batkivshchyna
- Other political affiliations: Yulia Tymoshenko Bloc
- Spouse: Svetlana
- Education: Odesa National Polytechnic University; Lviv University of Trade and Economics
- Website: dubovoy.com.ua

Oleksandr Fedorovych Dubovoy (Ukrainian: Олександр Федорович Дубовой; born 11 March 1976) is a Ukrainian politician who served as a People's Deputy of Ukraine from 2007 to 2014, first as a member of the Yulia Tymoshenko Bloc and later as a member of Batkivshchyna.

== Early life ==
Oleksandr Dubovoy was born in Kiliya, in Ukraine's Odesa Oblast in what was then part of the Soviet Union.

== Career ==
- 1995-1997 — Deputy Director of the Developer "Dombudkonstruktsiya" Izmail.
- 1997-2002 — Deputy Director for General Affairs of Christian Charitable Foundation "Doverie" in Izmail, Odesa region.
- 2002-2004 — Deputy Director for Legal Affairs, "Poliservis" LLC Manufacturing & Trading Company in Odesa.
- 2004-2006 — First Deputy Chairman of the Board of CJSC "Ukrainian Investment Group" LLC, Kyiv.
- 2006-2007 —President of CJSC "International Investment Group" in Kyiv. The joint-stock company made a significant contribution to the development of small and medium business in Ukraine.
- 2007 —President of International Charitable Organization "Foundation of the Good and Love", the main purpose is charitable activities.
- 23 November 2007 — 12 December 2012 — Ukrainian MP of the 6th convocation, Committee on Fuel and Energy Complex, Nuclear Policy and Nuclear Safety. Author and co-author of a number of specialized bills.
- 12 December 2012 – 27 November 2014 — Ukrainian MP of the 7th convocation. Chairman of Committee on Legislative Support of Law Enforcement. Chairman of the Subcommittee on Legislation of Administrative Offences, public order protection and public safety.
- 7 May 2014 – Vladimir Nemirovsky accused Dubovoy of organizing the 2014 Odesa clashes. In July, the court ordered Nemirovsky to reject this false report.
- 5 March 2015 - Headed Ukrainian "Federation of Karate".
