= Chilia County =

County in Romania from 1941 to 1944

Chilia County (Romanian: Județul Chilia or Județul Chilia Nouă) was a county (județ) of Romania part of the Bessarabia Governorate. Having lost Bessarabia in 1940 following an ultimatum by the Soviet Union (USSR), Romania recovered the region in 1941 following the Axis invasion of the USSR during World War II. Chilia County was the only Romanian county in Bessarabia that had not been created earlier in the administrative reform of 1930.

Chilia County was divided into three plăși ("districts"), Plasa Chilia (capital Chilia or Chilia Nouă, now Kiliia; composed of 17 communes with a total of 26 villages), Plasa Tarutino (capital Tarutino or Ancecrac, now Bessarabske; composed of 12 communes with a total of 20 villages) and Plasa Tătărești (capital Tătărești, composed of 16 communes with a total of 25 villages).

In 1944, Romania abandoned the Axis and joined the Allies, having to agree to giving up Bessarabia again.
