= Kiliia =

City in Odesa Oblast, Ukraine

Kiliia Кілія
- City
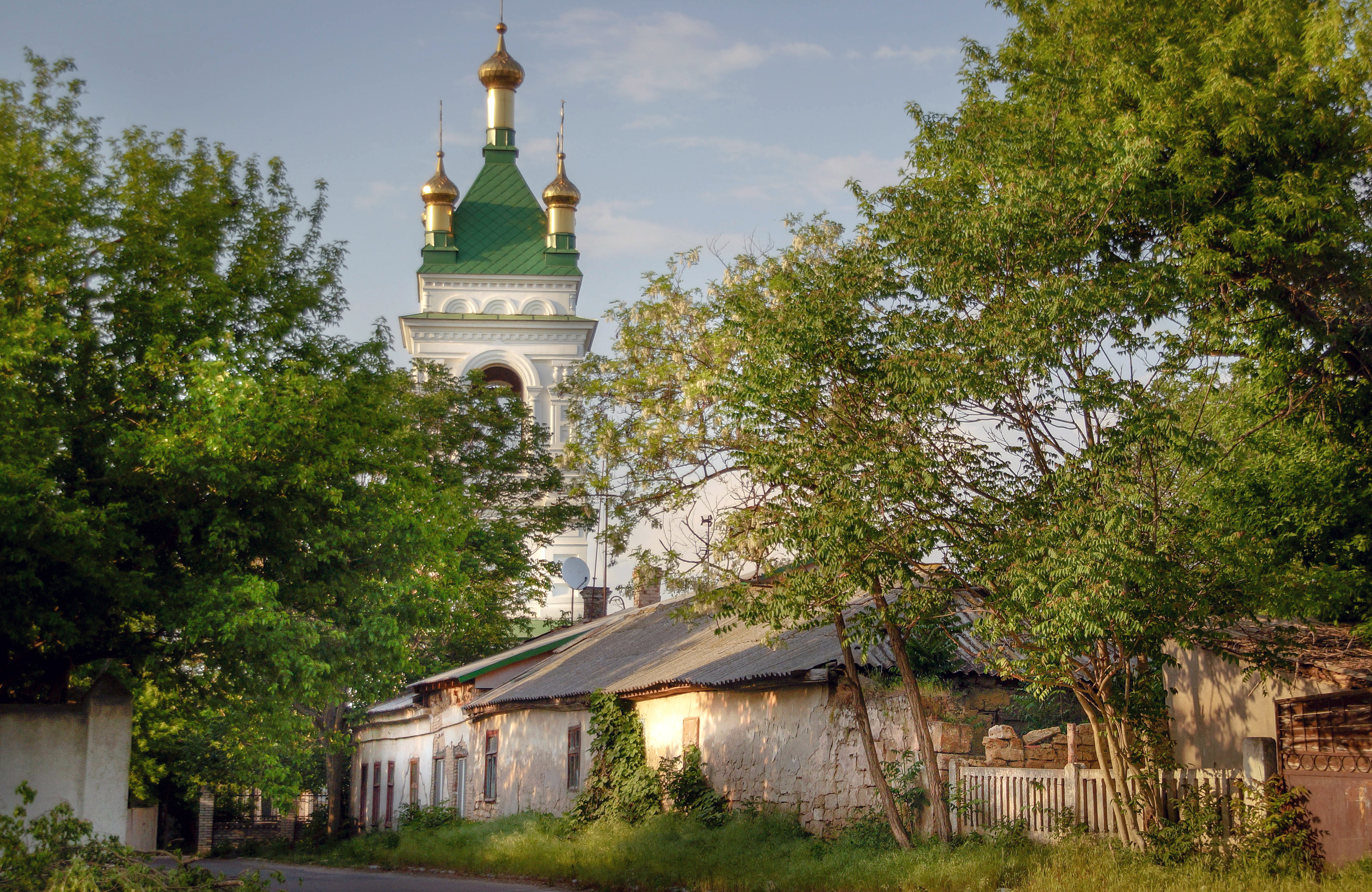
- Old street with the view at the St. Nicholas Church

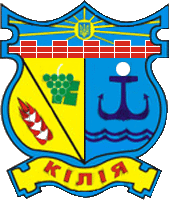
- Coat of arms

- Location in Ukraine Kiliia (Ukraine)
- Coordinates: 45°27′N 29°14′E
- Country: Ukraine
- Oblast: Odesa Oblast
- Raion: Izmail Raion
- Hromada: Kiliia urban hromada
- City founded: 862

Government
  - Mayor: Pavlo Boychenko

Area
  - Total: 19.5 km^{2} (7.5 sq mi)
- Elevation: 5 m (16 ft)

Population (2022)
  - Total: 18,745
  - Density: 961/km^{2} (2,490/sq mi)
- Time zone: UTC+2 (EET)
  - Summer (DST): UTC+3 (EEST)
- Postal code: 68300 - 68303
- Area code: +380 4843

Kiliia, Kiliya or Kilia (Ukrainian: Кілія, IPA: [kil⁽ʲ⁾iˈjɑ]; Russian: Килия; Romanian: Chilia Nouă) is a city in Izmail Raion, Odesa Oblast, southwestern Ukraine. It hosts the administration of Kiliia urban hromada, one of the hromadas of Ukraine. Kiliia is located in the Danube Delta, in the historic Bessarabian district of Budjak; across the river lies the town of Chilia Veche (Old Kiliia) in Romania. The Chilia branch of the Danube river, which separates Ukraine from Romania, is named after it. Population: 18,745 (2022 estimate).

== History ==
Historical affiliations

Byzantine Empire until 1361
From 1361 until 1412 contested between Kingdom of Hungary, Wallachia, Poland, the Republic of Genoa and the Ottoman Empire
Principality of Moldavia 1412–1448
Kingdom of Hungary 1448–1465
Principality of Moldavia 1465–1484
Ottoman Empire 1484–1812
Russian Empire 1812–1856
Ottoman Empire 1856–1878
Russian Empire 1878–1917
Moldavian Democratic Republic 1917–1918
Kingdom of Romania 1918–1940
Soviet Union 1940–1941
Kingdom of Romania 1941–1944
Soviet Union 1944–1991
Ukraine 1991–present

A town on the Romanian side of the Chilia branch of the Danube, now known as Chilia Veche or "Old Chilia", was founded by the Greek Byzantines – κελλία, kellia in Greek being the equivalent of "granaries", a name first recorded in 1241, in the works of the Persian chronicler Rashid-al-Din Hamadani. Kiliia is therefore sometimes referred to as Nova Kiliia meaning "New Kiliia".

In the place that is now Kiliia, a large colony was established by the Republic of Genoa, known as "Licostomo" and headed by a consul (a representative of the Republic in the region). From that time, only the defensive ditches of a Genoese fortress remained.

The city was founded by Stephen the Great of Moldavia, in order to counteract the Ottoman Empire which had taken control over Chilia Veche in the 15th century. It was a major Moldavian port. However, it was eventually conquered by the Ottomans in 1484. In 1570 (Hijri 977) the town of Kilia was inhabited by Muslims and Christians. It had 298 Muslim households in 13 neighbourhoods and 316 Christian households in 5 neighbourhoods and it was a "has" of the Sultan, a land property that was directly owned by the Sultan. One of the Muslim neighbourhoods was recorded as a Circassian neighbourhood. Kiliia was taken by the Russian army under the command of the general Ivan Gudovich during Russo-Turkish War (1787–1792). The Times of London reported that "35,000 of the inhabitants were involved in a general massacre," an incident that had "been celebrated in prose and poetry." The city was given back to the Ottomans in 1792, but retaken by the Russians in 1806 and awarded to them officially in 1812.

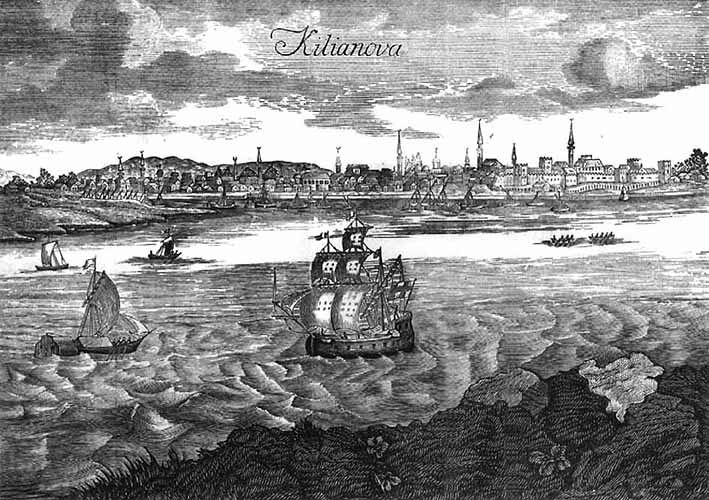
Kiliya in the 15th century

After being bombarded by the Anglo-French fleet in July 1854 during the Crimean War, it was given to Romania in the Treaty of Paris (1856). In 1878 (Congress of Berlin), Kiliia was transferred back to Russia together with Budjak. Between 1918 and 1940 (Interwar period, Greater Romania) it was again part of Romania. In July 1940, after a Soviet ultimatum, Romania agreed to give up Bessarabia and northern Bukovina; the Soviet Union occupied it and came to the Ukrainian SSR (it was held yet again by Romania, from 1941 to 1944, in World War II, time during which it was the capital of the Chilia County), and passed on to independent Ukraine after the dissolution of the Soviet Union. The Jews were deported to Transnistria (the area between the Dniester and Bug rivers) by the Romanian authorities in 1941, where a large majority of the 316 deported Jews died. According to the Yad Vashem website, 199 Jews who had lived before the war in Kiliia whose names are listed died in Ukraine.

The oldest building in Kiliia is the semi-subterranean church of St. Nicholas, which may go back to 1485, although an old inscription in the church claims that it was founded on 10 May 1647.

Until 18 July 2020, Kiliia was the administrative center of Kiliia Raion. The raion was abolished in July 2020 as part of the administrative reform of Ukraine, which reduced the number of raions of Odesa Oblast to seven. The area of Kiliia Raion was merged into Izmail Raion.

== Demographics ==
As of the 2001 Ukrainian census, Ukrainians constitute the majority of the town's population. Russians, Moldovans and Bulgarians form significant minorities.

Ethnic groups in Kiliia
	percent
Ukrainians	55.41%
Russians	28.41%
Moldovans	9.67%
Bulgarians	3.63%
Gagauz	0.91%
Belarusians	0.51%
Jews	0.16%
Armenians	0.07%
Georgians	0.05%

In 2001, 55.5% of the inhabitants spoke Russian as their native language, while 39.56% spoke Ukrainian and 2.93% of the inhabitants spoke Romanian.

== Economy ==
Historically, Kilia served as a trading outpost. Along with nearby Vylkove, it is an important fishing location on the Danube river. There is also a ship repairment facility in the city.

== Notable people ==
- Emilian Bucov (1909–1984), Soviet Moldovan writer and poet
- Vadym Prystaiko (born 1970), Ukrainian diplomat
- Oleksandr Dubovoy (born 1976), Ukrainian politician (Batkivshchyna)
- Ihor Nesterenko (born 1990), Israeli-Ukrainian basketball player in the Israel Basketball Premier League

== Gallery ==
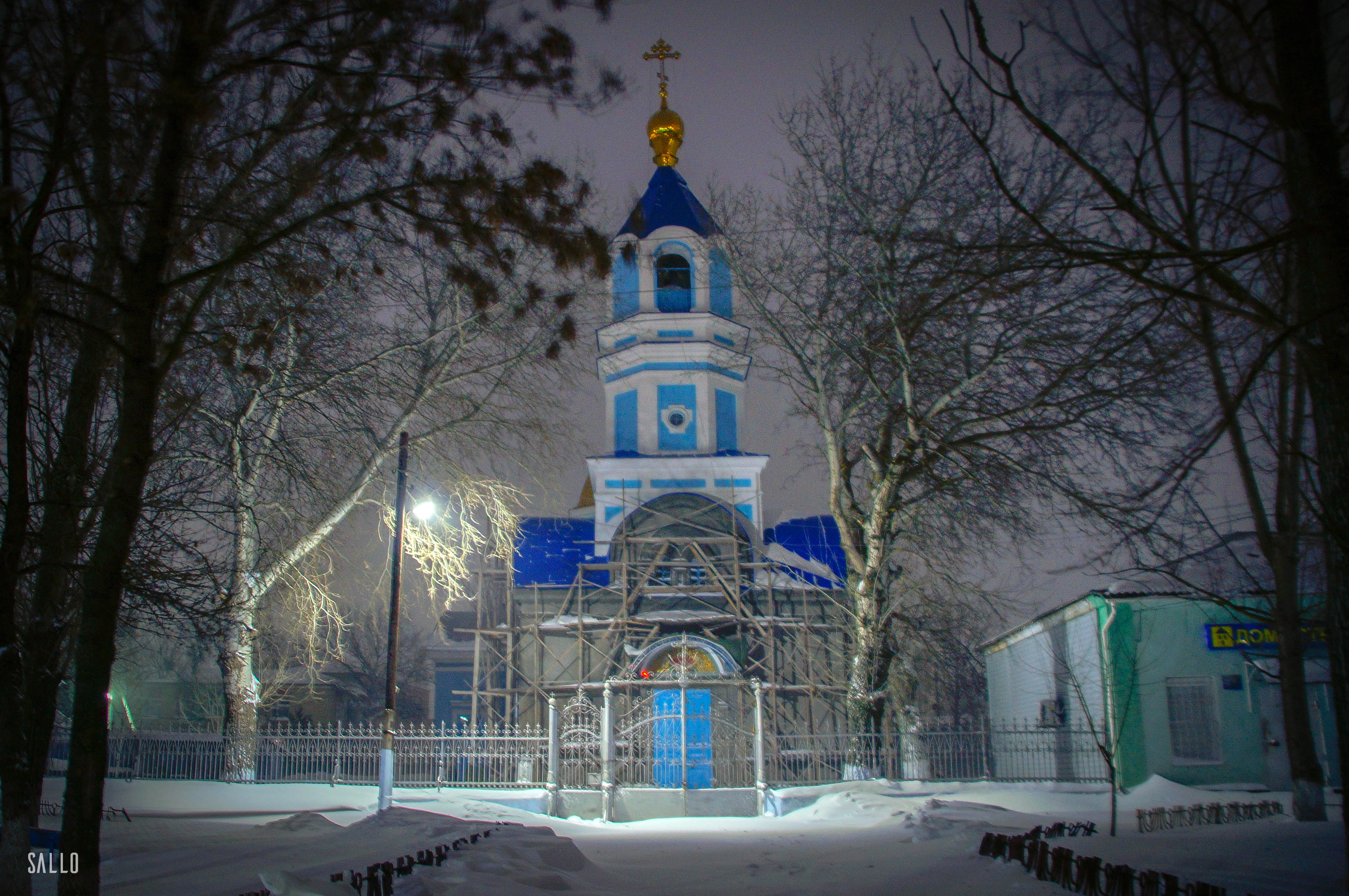
Intercession of the Theotokos Church

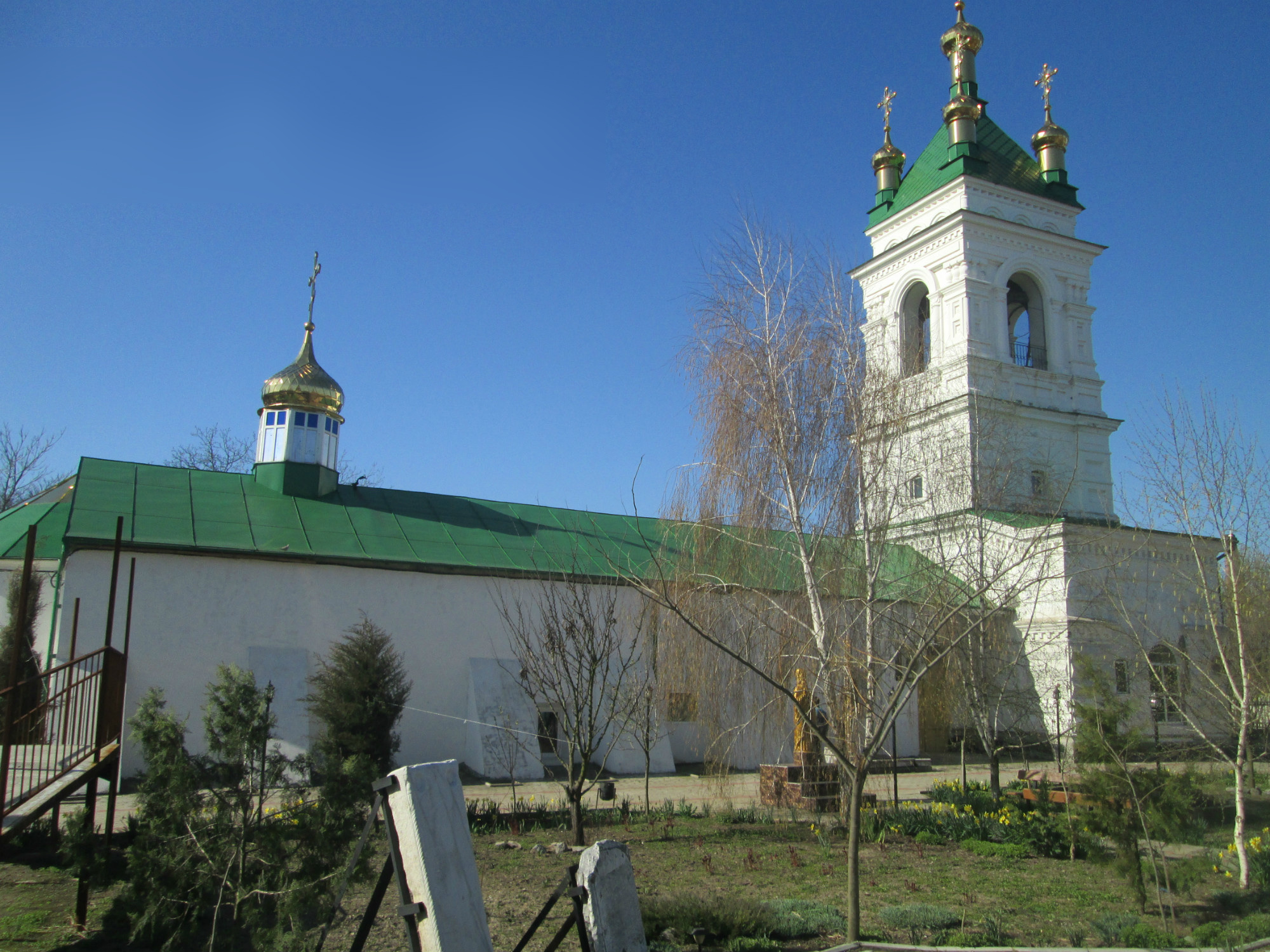
St. Nicholas Church

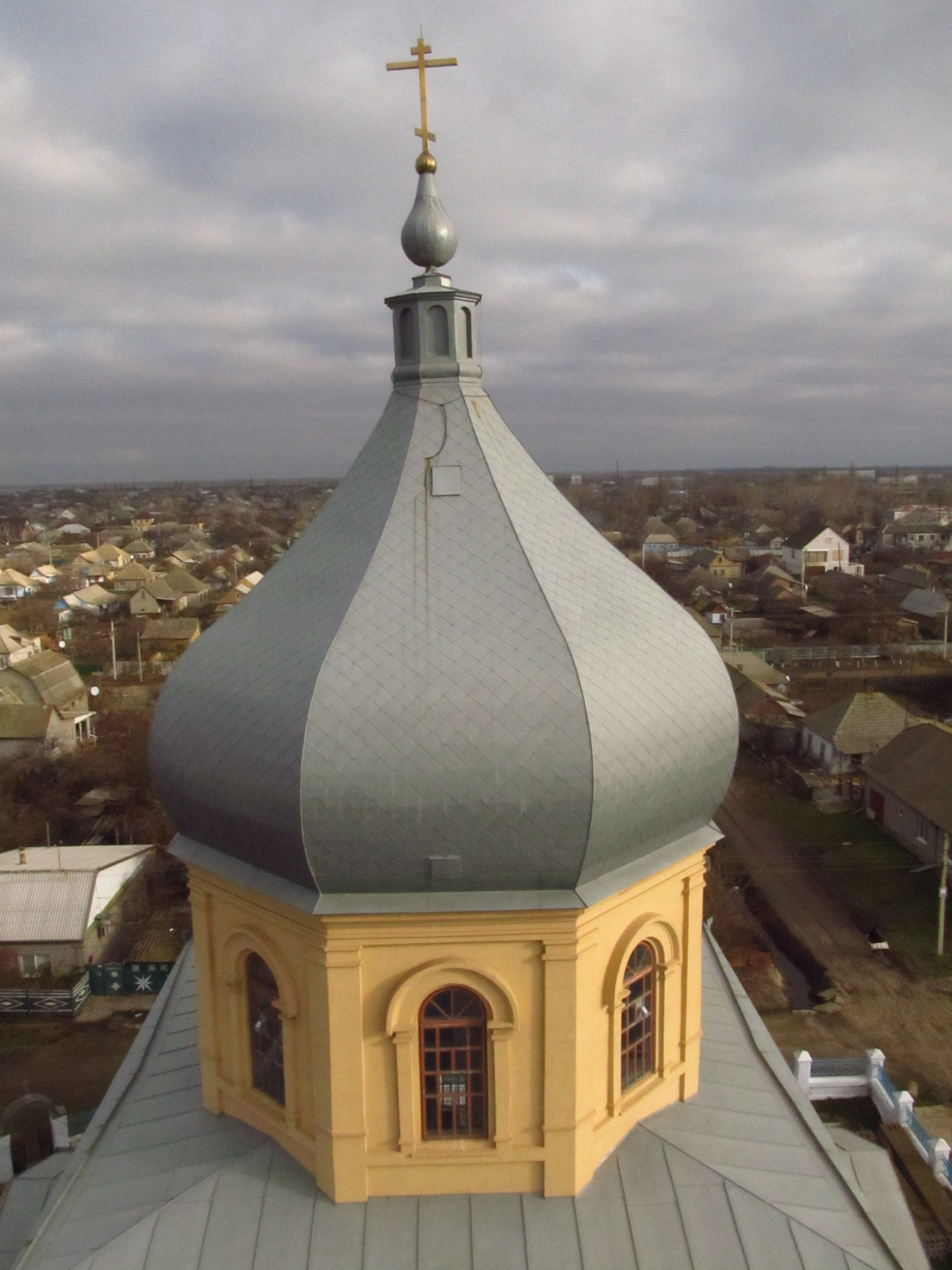
Skyline of Kiliia from one of the churches

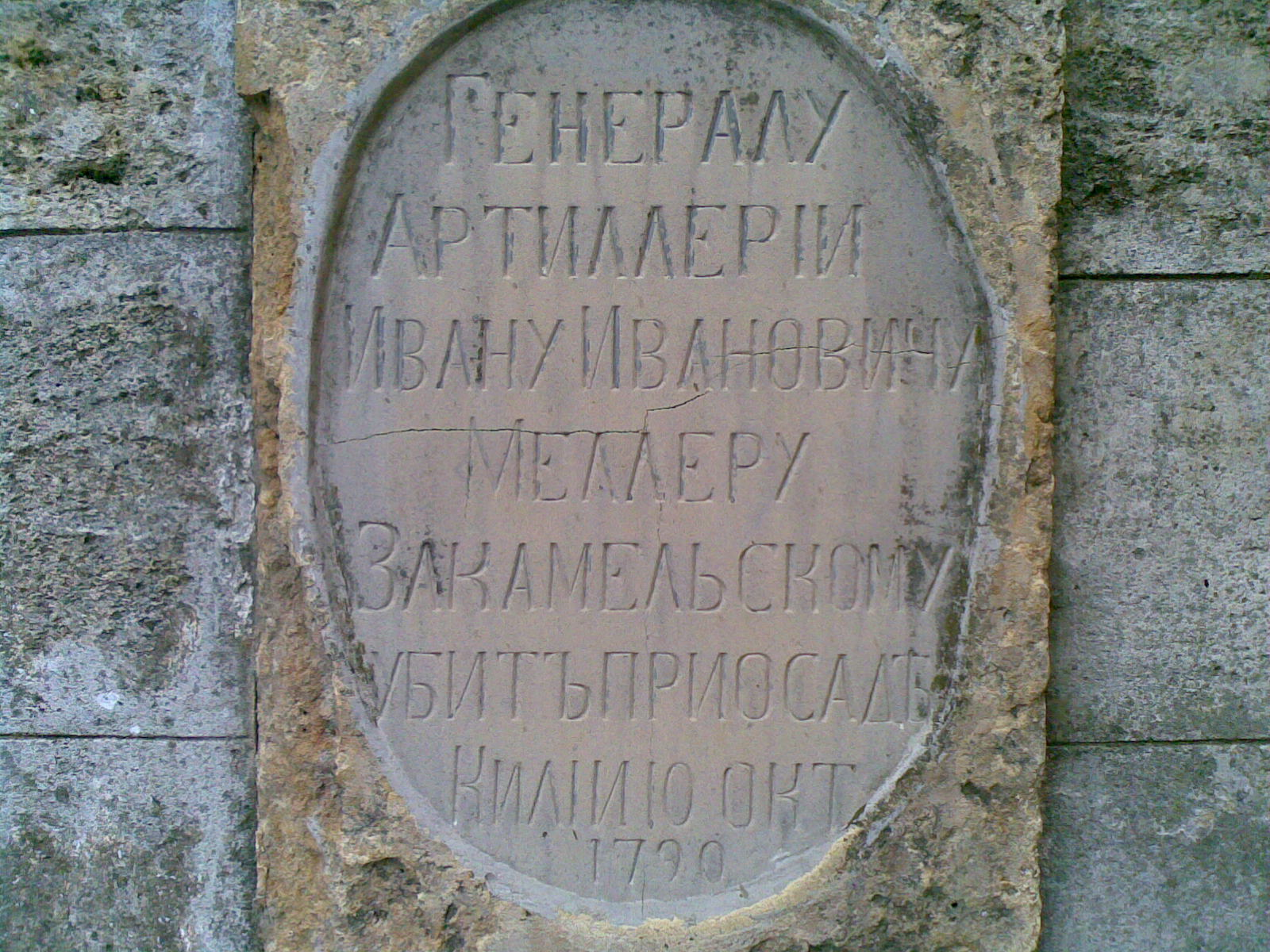
Tombstone in Kherson of soldier fallen in the siege of Kiliia

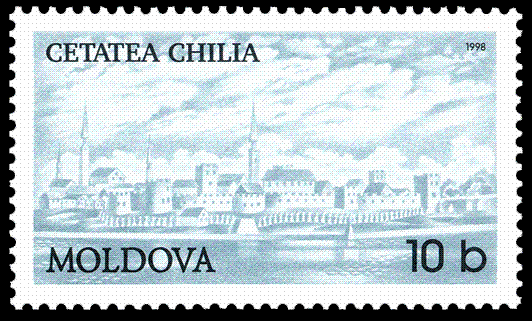
Kiliia Fortress
