= Akkermansky Uyezd =

Subdivision of the Bessarabia Governorate of the Russian Empire

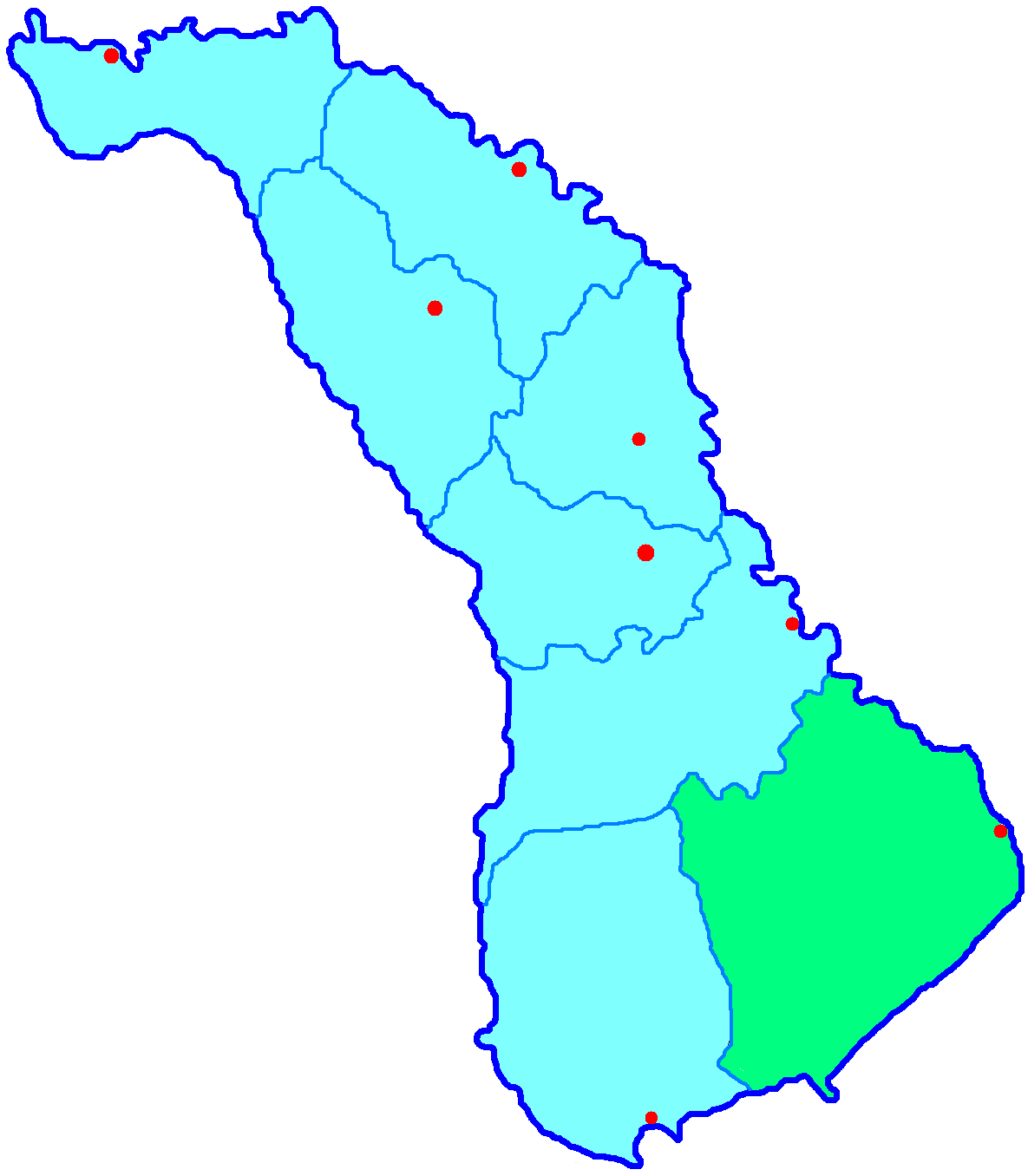
Akkermansky County map

Akkermansky County (Russian: Аккерманский уезд, romanized: Akkermansky Uyezd) was an uezd, one of the subdivisions of the Bessarabia Governorate of the Russian Empire. It was situated in the southeastern part of the governorate. Its administrative centre was Bilhorod-Dnistrovskyi (Akkerman).

== Demographics ==
At the time of the Russian Empire Census of 1897, Akkermansky Uyezd had a population of 265,247. Of these, 26.7% spoke Ukrainian, 21.3% Bulgarian, 16.4% Moldovan and Romanian, 16.4% German, 9.6% Russian, 4.6% Yiddish, 3.9% Gagauz or Turkish, 0.4% Romani, 0.2% Armenian, 0.1% French, 0.1% Polish and 0.1% Belarusian as their native language.

== See also ==
- Cetatea Albă County
