= Kiliia Raion =

Former subdivision of Odesa Oblast, Ukraine

Coordinates: 45°34′N 29°20′E

Kiliia Raion Кілійський район
- Raion
- Kiliiskyi raion
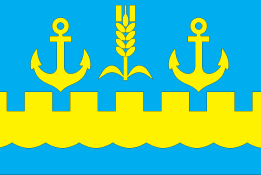
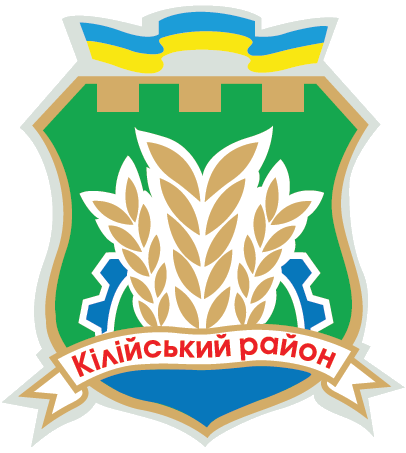
- Flag Coat of arms

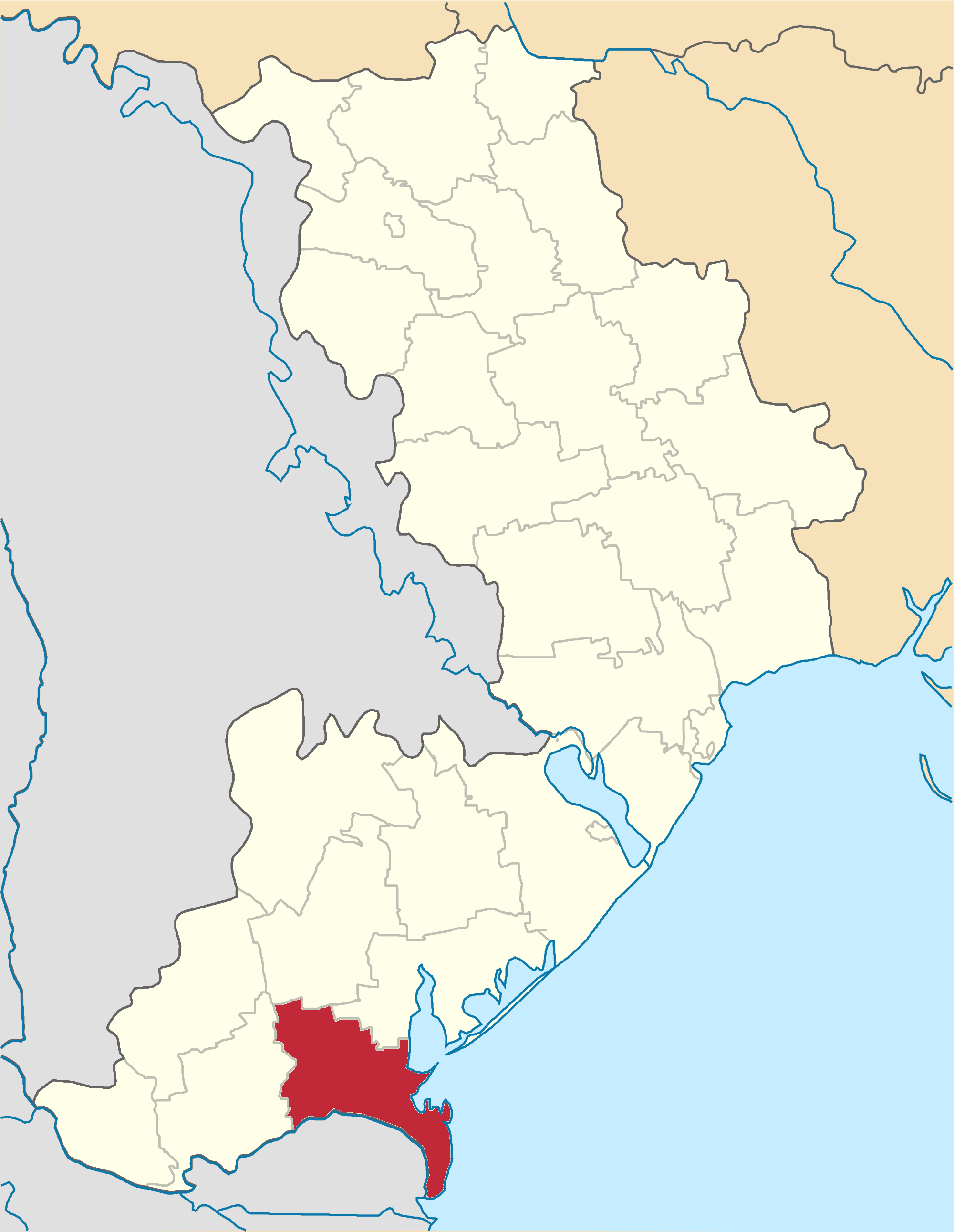
- Country: Ukraine
- Oblast: Odesa Oblast
- Disestablished: 18 July 2020
- Admin. center: Kiliia
- Subdivisions: List: — city councils; — settlement councils; — rural councils; Number of localities: — cities; — urban-type settlements; 16 — villages; — rural settlements

Area
  - Total: 1,359 km^{2} (525 sq mi)

Population (2020)
  - Total: 50,386
  - Density: 37.08/km^{2} (96.03/sq mi)
- Time zone: UTC+02:00 (EET)
  - Summer (DST): UTC+03:00 (EEST)
- Area code: +380

Kiliia Raion (Ukrainian: Кілійський район, romanized: Kiliiskyi raion) was a raion (district) in Odesa Oblast of Ukraine. It was part of the historical region of Bessarabia. Its administrative center was the city of Kiliia. The small sector of the Danube Delta that lies in Ukraine lied partially in this raion. The raion was abolished and its territory was merged into Izmail Raion on 18 July 2020 as part of the administrative reform of Ukraine, which reduced the number of raions of Odesa Oblast to seven. The last estimate of the raion population was 50,386 (2020 est.).

The raion was formed on November 11, 1940, first as part of the Ackerman region, and from December of the same year — the Izmail region. On February 15, 1954 the territory of the raion was included in the Odesa region.

Liquidated in accordance with the Resolution of the Verkhovna Rada of Ukraine «On the formation and liquidation of raion» of July 17, 2020, No. 807-IX.

The territory of the raion became part of the re-founded Izmail raion.

The population of the raion lived in 20 settlements, including 2 cities, 16 villages, and 2 settlements, which were part of 2 cities and 13 village councils. The administrative center of the raion is the city of Kiliia. The number of the population of the raion on December 1, 2011, was 53,646 people, of which 55% are urban population.

The industry of the raion was represented by enterprises of mining, food industry, processing of agricultural products, and mechanical engineering. The area had a strong potential for the development of tourist services. The area had reserves of brick raw materials (under arable land), building stone (limestone), and building sand. A large area of the raion was occupied by checks for growing rice.

The Rostov-Odesa-Reni E87 M15 highway passed through the raion. The length of public roads was 244.1 km, all paved. The station of the Odesa-Ismail-Dzinilor railway line was located in the north-west of the Kiliia raion. The area was served by water transport through the Danube port — Ust-Dunaisk and the checkpoints Kiliia and Vylkove. There were 2 sewerage networks in the raion, there was a water supply system in 6 settlements.

In the Danube Delta in the extreme southwest of the raion, the city of Vylkove was located, known as Ukrainian Venice, thanks to numerous Jericam channels, gun along the streets. In the south, there is one of the oldest cities of Ukraine — Kiliia. In the Black Sea, there is a single sea island in Ukraine — snake, near the coast of which rare objects were found, the age of which reaches an era of antiquity. Near the village of Liski was created by the botanical reserve of the local scales. Much of the islands of Delta Danube and large territories of the Danube flooded that in the southwestern part of the raion are part of the Danube Biosphere Reserve. In the Danube Delta on the territory of Kiliia and Ismail raions, the Regional Landscape Park `Ismail Islands` was created.

== Administrative divisions ==
At the time of disestablishment, the raion consisted of two hromadas:

- Kiliia urban hromada with the administration in Kiliia;
- Vylkove urban hromada with the administration in the city of Vylkove.

== Physical and geographical characteristics ==
=== Location ===
Kiliia raion was located in the southwestern part of Ukraine, in the extreme southeast of Odesa region. The territory of the raion stretches for 61 km in length and 56 km in latitude. To the west, on land and partly on Lake China, the raion borders the Ismail raion. Its neighbor in the north-west was Artsyz raion, in the north — Tatarbunary raion, the border with which partly passed through the estuary Sasyk. To the south, the Kiliia raion was bounded by the state border with Romania along the Danube. A total of 182 km of the state border runs within the raion. In the east, the territory of the raion was limited by the waters of the Black Sea, the seacoast of which reaches a length of almost 60 km. The Kiliia raion also included a number of islands in the Danube Delta as well as the sea island of Zmiiny, which is 37 kilometers away from the mainland.

=== Administrative and territorial structure ===
As of January 1, 2012, the system of local self-government of Kiliia raion consists of 15 administrative-territorial units, including 13 village and 2 city councils, which, in turn, consist of 20 settlements, namely 2 cities of raion importance, 16 villages and 2 settlements. The power of self-government bodies of 9 villages and 1 city extends to only one settlement; 4 village councils and 1 city council have 2 settlements each. On the island of Zmiiny, there is the only settlement in Ukraine completely separated from the mainland: the village of Bile on Snake Island. Raion authorities are the Kiliia raion Council and the Kiliia raion State Administration.

The territory of Kiliia raion occupies 135,869.5 hectares, which is 4.08% of the area of the Odesa region (13th place in the region). Of these: agricultural land occupies 74,038.52 hectares, 1,321.14 hectares are occupied by farm buildings and yards, 1,268 hectares are under farm roads and girders, 2,501 hectares are forest lands, 3,910.7994 hectares are built-up lands, swamps - 29,566.73 ha, open lands without vegetation cover or with insignificant cover —1,708.8106 ha and 21,554.5 ha are underwater. The total land area of settlements is 7,458.6 hectares — 5.1% of the raion.

=== Climate ===
Kiliia raion is located in the temperate-continental climate zone. The temperature difference in the area reaches 5 °C. The average annual temperature is +11.1 °C. Winter is mild, short and light snow with frequent thaws, lasts from mid-November to late March (4.5 months), the average temperature is +0.8 °C. The coldest month of the year is January, with an average temperature of −1 °C and a minimum temperature of −22.8 °C. Summer is long, warm, rarely hot, but with insufficient humidity, lasts from mid-May to late September (4.5 months), average temperature +20.8 °C. The warmest month is July, the average temperature is +24 °C, the maximum is +37.8 °C. The duration of the frost-free period varies in the range of 250–260 days, the growing season — up to 297 days.

=== Air temperature ===
300–600 mm of precipitation falls per year. The wettest months are June, July and November, during which the monthly rainfall is about 60–80 mm. The driest months are January and February, when 20–30 mm of precipitation falls. The average annual humidity is 75%. The highest humidity occurs in the cold season (November — February 85-90%), the lowest — in May 56-60%. Blizzards are quite rare in winter, the snow cover reaches a height of not more than 4 cm. Occasionally there are droughts, accompanied by dry winds and dust storms. Fogs and dew are common. They can be observed throughout the year, but most fogs appear in the cold half of the year (November – May), while dew—in the summer.

=== Monthly precipitation ===
The average annual wind speed is 3.8 m/s. From September to April, the northern (18–41%) and north-western winds (12–26%) have the highest frequency. Only in May, there is no clear predominance of any wind direction. In June–August, prevailing winds from the south and east, the frequency of each direction, reaches 35%. The highest wind speed and the highest number of days with wind speeds above 15 m/s are observed in the cold season (November — March).

=== Wind speed gradation ===
The average duration of daylight, which particularly affects the process of photoperiodic of living organisms, is 11 hours 46 minutes. The longest day in June is up to 15 hours and 50 minutes, while the shortest is in December — 8 hours and 35 minutes.

=== Relief ===
The territory of Kiliia raion lies on the south-western edge of the Eastern European plain within the Black Sea lowlands and borders the Danube River, due to which some parts of it differ markedly in their natural conditions. The surface is mostly flat, rising above sea level by 5–42 m with a slope from northwest to southeast, to the Black Sea coast and the Danube Delta. The plain is crossed by shallow river valleys, ravines and gullies. The location on the Eastern European platform minimizes the manifestations of such natural phenomena like earthquakes and volcanism. The nature reserve and park fund of the raion consist of 22 objects with a total area of 52,362.1 ha (39% of the territory of Kiliia raion), including 19 parks of garden and park art (9.3 ha), the Botanical Reserve of local significance Liski and 46,402, 9 ha of the Danube Biosphere Reserve — a protected area of national importance.

The soil layer of the raion was formed on forest rocks and is represented mainly by chernozems, namely the southern chernozems and dark-chestnut slightly saline soils common in the raion. Sod-sandy soils are formed on a coastal spit and overflow, in the Danube delta — sod-gley, silt-gley and peat-gley soils. The average thickness of humus horizons is 53 cm, with an average fertility (soil-agrochemical index) of 53 points. In order to protect the soil cover from weathering, prevent freezing of crops and soil erosion, the territory of the northern Kiliia raion is covered with a network of forest belts.

Kiliia raion does not have a great variety of minerals. The most common are solid non-metallic minerals of local importance — sand, loam, gravel, limestone, pebbles, marl, which are used as building materials. Together with Saratsky, it is part of the oil and gas field. The Black Sea shelf is being studied more actively to identify oil and gas fields.

=== Aquatic resources ===
The raion has large reserves of surface water belonging to the Danube and Northern Black Sea basins. In the south flows the main waterway in Europe - the Danube River, namely the Kiliia raion estuary, 58 km of which belong to the raion. The river is of great economic importance in irrigation, shipping, and in providing drinking water to the inhabitants of the region. On the left bank of the lower Danube, in the valley from the mouth of the Kiliia to the north, there are many reservoirs, including small rivers of local importance: Dracula (21.2 km), Nerushai (12 km), Yenikoy (11.5 km), Aliaga (8.7 km), and Kyrgyz-China (5.5 km); 3 flowing beams: Priozerna (5.5 km), Kanazir (5 km) and Kazeyka (4.8 km), about 100 small estuaries, rivers and streams, and about 100 lakes, estuaries and ponds with a water volume of about 8 million m^{3}. Among the latter are the artificially isolated estuary of the Sasyk (Kunduk) lagoon, separated from the sea only by a narrow strip of sand-shell alluvium, and the freshwater lake of the floodplain-estuary China, as well as Lakes Zeleny Kut and Lebedynka, Limba Lake. Dracula and Kazei Reservoirs, Pukalovsky Estuary, Karachev Estuary (Shvedovo), Small Salt Estuary, Grabovsky Estuary, Liskovsky Ponds and Furmanovsky Pond; Trudovsky and Shevchenkivsky fish farms, Kiliysky and Vilkivsky PTRH, and Bazarchuk Bay. In the east, the raion is washed by the Black Sea, on the shores of which are the Primorye resort and entertainment zone and Vilkivsky recreational complex of green tourism.

The total area occupied by water is 21,554.5 hectares, which is about 16% of the raion. Of these, natural watercourses make up 4,105.63 ha of the raion, artificial watercourses — 4,059.63 ha, under lakes and estuaries — 12,063.09 ha; ponds — 5,919 hectares, and 1,266.96 hectares are occupied by artificial reservoirs. Due to hydrological and geological-geomorphological conditions, the depth of groundwater from the earth's surface is 1–15 m.

=== Flora ===
The area lies in the steppe zone, respectively, the natural vegetation of the region — steppe. The south is characterized by meadow vegetation, which occupies the plains of riparian and floodplain ridges, and is represented by groups of swampy, saline, true, and steppe meadows, grassy swamps, and swampy meadows. Wetland vegetation (reeds, hornbeams) is a characteristic element of the Danube floodplains and lake vegetation. Saline and saline vegetation is represented by rather insignificant areas. With the advance to the north, more steppe species appear, among which herbaceous plants predominate (over 90% of species), which are adapted to conditions of medium humidity and drought. The range of leading families consists of aster, cereals, legumes, sedges, crucifers, quince, carnations, labiate, buckwheat, umbrella, buttercups, rough-leaved, etc. In the south and southwest of the raion there are small areas of forest vegetation. It is dominated by different species of willows. Among them, the most common are white willow and brittle willow.

A significant place in the flora of the raion belongs to aquatic vegetation. It is represented by unrooted free-floating, rooted submerged, rooted with floating leaves, and air-water forms. Common toaster (seaweed), phyllophora (red algae), chara, and other algae. There are also many very small unicellular algae (phytoplankton) in the water column. Especially developed diatoms and dinoflagellants. The number and biomass of planktonic algae are highest in the surface layer of water, reaching several tens of millions of cells per liter in summer.

Numerous species of flora of Kiliia raion are listed in the Red Book of Ukraine. Among the Red Book species are protected, in particular, floating salvinia, floating water nut, floating thyme, swordfish, sword-grass marsh, Aldrovanda vesicular, cuckoo marsh, marsh marigold, and hellebore, white-flowered.

=== Fauna ===
Due to its geographical location and climatic conditions, Kiliia raion differs from other regions of Ukraine by diverse fauna, ichthyo- and ornithofauna, hunting and other species of fauna, represented by 1,500 species of invertebrates and more than 400 species of vertebrates.

The most numerous and most important group of vertebrates of the raion in terms of both conservation and ecology are birds. More than 320 species of birds have been registered, including rare species such as cormorants, woodpeckers, gray, red, red and great white egrets, quacks, terns and grouse, pink and curly, white-tailed eagles and white-tailed eagles.

Among amphibians, the most numerous are lake and edible frogs, common terns and Danube newts. Also found crested newt, red-bellied godmot her, grass.

Among the reptiles are numerous marsh turtles, common snakes and agile lizards. There are colorful foot-and-mouth disease, Crimean lizards, water snakes, common and eastern steppe vipers.

Common representatives of mammals are hares, hamsters, gophers. There are also roe deer, wild boar, fox, badger, marten and others. Of particular interest is the only representative of pinnies in the Black Sea — the monk seal, some individuals of which until the ‘80s were observed in the Ukrainian part of the Danube Delta in the reserve. In the Black Sea there are populations of dolphins (bottlenose dolphin, white-tailed deer, Azov). Among the amphibians - the inhabitants of freshwater: introduced muskrats and raccoons, as well as rare Red Book — ermine, river otter, European mink. The forest cat is seldom found in floodplains.

The ichthyofauna of rivers is diverse. Rivers and lakes are home to bream, pike perch, catfish, pike, carp, perch and other fish species. Breed silver carp, grass carp, carp. In the Danube area there are species of fish included in the IUCN Red List: thorn, Atlantic sturgeon, Black Sea and Danube salmon, umber, chop large and small, sterlet, carp, Danube snipe, shemaia, ruff stripe, beluga, beluga, in the fresh waters of Europe), and others. The most valuable industrial species are sturgeon and Danube herring.

Of the species of wild fauna of the Kiliia raion, many are listed in the Red Book of Ukraine and the IUCN Red List: gogol, burial eagle, field and steppe kite, pink starling, and others.

== History ==
In the first and third centuries, the northwestern Black Sea coast was conquered by the Romans, who were replaced in the third century by the Goths from the northwest, and at the end of the fourth century by the Huns who invaded from the east. In the 8th century, Albanian-Bulgarian tribes settled between the Danube and Dniester rivers. During the times of Kievan Rus, Slavs lived here, which in turn in the 12th century. Expelled the Pechenegs from here. Later, the Polovtsians migrated here, which was replaced in the 13th century by the Mongol-Tatar hordes, whose rule led to the gradual transformation of the Northern Black Sea Coast into the so-called Wild Field. But in the 15th century, these territories were conquered by the Ottoman Empire. In the 15th century. From the disintegrating Golden Horde, the Crimean Khanate emerged, whose rulers controlled the territory between the Dniester and the Southern Bug. The Transnistria part, then called Budzhak, came under the rule of the Moldavian principality, which gradually became under the control of the Ottoman Empire from the middle of the 15th century. In 1475, the Crimean Khanate became a vassal of the Ottoman Empire, which since then and for almost three hundred years has turned the Northern Black Sea coast into a springboard for Ottoman-Tatar attacks on the northern lands.

At the beginning of the 19th century, vast areas of the former Wild Field began to be gradually inhabited by immigrants (mostly runaway peasants) from the Commonwealth, the Russian Empire and Moldova. The Russian Empire needed three Russo-Turkish wars (1768–1774, 1787–1792, and 1806–1812) to finally drive the Turks out of modern-day Kiliia. However, in 1856, as a result of the unsuccessful Crimean War for the Russian Empire, the Danube passed from it to the Ottoman Empire and was returned only in 1878. In 1918–1920, the territory of the raion underwent foreign military intervention and was occupied by the Kingdom of Romania (1918), of which it was a part until 1940.

On November 11, 1940, after the departure of Bessarabia to the USSR under the Molotov–Ribbentrop Pact, a new administrative-territorial unit was formed, first in the Ackerman region (August 7-December 7, 1940), and later in the Ismail region, the Kiliia raion. The period of uncertainty was the war years of World War II, when the area was occupied by troops of the Kingdom of Romania. In 1944 the raion finally became part of the Ukrainian SSR. With the arrival of Soviet troops, the mobilization of the able-bodied population into the ranks of the RSCA began. On the fronts of Central and Southern Europe, 2,063 people died and went missing. The names of Soviet Kiel soldiers and fellow villagers who died during World War II have been engraved on the slabs and stelae of 18 monuments and obelisks in the towns and villages of the raion.

Beginning on February 15, 1954, the territory of the Ismail region was included in the Odesa region. As a result of Khrushchev's reforms of the administrative division on December 30, 1962, the raion were consolidated. Kiliia raion was liquidated, and its territory is divided between Ismail and Tatarbunary raions. Thus the city of Kiliia was allocated to the city of regional subordination on subordination to it of the city of Vylkove. After the removal of Khrushchev from 1965 to 1966, many former raions were restored. Thus, on January 4, 1965, the Kiliia raion was restored from parts of the Izmail and Tatarbunary raions and the Kiliya City Council. On February 5, 1965, by the Decree of the Presidium of the Verkhovna Rada of the Ukrainian SSR, the Novoselivka Village Council of the Izmail raion was transferred to the Kiliia raion.

94 primary party, 153 trade union, 98 Komsomol organizations are being created. 11 monuments to VI Lenin are erected. Agriculture is actively developing, there are 11 collective farms, 3 fish farms, 5 state farms, which are assigned 69.6 thousand hectares of agricultural land. Swamps are being drained, on the basis of which checks for rice cultivation are being built. Already at the end of the ‘60s rice crops in the area occupy about 5.5 thousand hectares. 20 industrial enterprises are starting to work, employing 14,400 Kiliia. In 1969, the population was served by 35 medical institutions, which involved 110 doctors and 450 employees with secondary special education. In 26 secondary schools, including 15 secondary, 9 eight-year, and 2 schools of working and rural youth during this period, 770 teachers teach almost 11,000 students. There are 3 cinemas, 21 stationary cinemas. Cultural and educational work is carried out by 20 houses of culture, 6 clubs, 35 libraries, and a museum of history and local lore on a voluntary basis.

Cells of parts of the city (Omarbia, Miyaki). Omarbia is named after the Ottoman naval admiral who in 1341 stormed the Venetian Kiliia with his flotilla. The lighthouse, which used to raise cattle, comes from the Ottoman `miyaki`, which means that it smells of milk and butter. Lake China is named after one of the leaders of the Tatar tribe, which was called China. The village of China (Red Yar) received the same name due to its location on the shores of the lake of the same name. Karamahmet - in honor of the last Ottoman commander of the Kiliia fortress, Kara Mahmet, who owned the lands of the modern village of Shevchenkove. Karashikir (Mirne) — in the name of the Ottoman lord who owned the lands of the village. Old Trojans, from the name of the Trojan shaft on both sides of which the village stretches. Colony Yenikioy took the name of the previous small Tatar settlement in the same place (literally sounds like `New Village`). Lipovania was named after the runaway schismatic Old Believers and the Don and Zaporozhian Cossacks. The village of Chamachur (Priozerne), which means `laundry`, was founded by Moldovan shepherds from the Carpathians. The village of Furmanivka took the name of the Tatar settlement. Many words remain from the Moldavian-Romanian domination in the vernacular — papushoya (corn), chapa (onion), ashak (donkey), brine (ear sauce), lamp, etc. The Ukrainian language of the Kiliia region underwent some changes under the influence of Russia, as a result of which the Southern Bessarabian dialect was formed.

With the proclamation of Independence of Ukraine on August 24, 1991, Kiliyshchyna became a part of Ukraine. In 2003, Snake Island was placed under the administrative jurisdiction of the Kiliia raion.

As a result of many wars and changes of government in the Kiliia raion, many historical monuments have been preserved. The Tatars and Turks preserved the geographical names of small rivers and lakes (China), settlements (Karamakhmet, Galilee), in the city.

During 2014, during an anti-terrorist operation in the east of Ukraine, the victims of the territorial expansion of the Russian Federation and the liquidation of terrorist organizations became three inhabitants of the Kiliia raion.

== Socio-economic characteristics ==
=== Population ===
The population of Kiliia raion as of January 1, 2012 amounted to 54,843 inhabitants, including urban — 29.8 thousand people (54.3%) and rural — 25.0 thousand people (45.7%). Kiliia Raion, within its boundaries at that time, had 59,837 inhabitants in 2001, including 36.09% Ukrainian-speakers, 12.81% Romanian-speakers, 44.23% Russian-speakers, 2.52% Bulgarian-speaking and 3.69% Gagauz-speaking. Kiliia Raion, within its boundaries at that time, had in 2001 59,837 inhabitants, of which 26,659 ethnic Ukrainians (44.55%), 17,977 ethnic Russians (30.04%), 9,442 Moldovans (15.78%), 2,559 Bulgarians (4.28%), 2,263 ethnic Gagauz (3.78%) and 54 Romanians (0.09%).

=== Industry ===
The industry of the raion is represented by enterprises of various forms of ownership, which are engaged in shipbuilding and ship repair, processing of agricultural products, as well as the manufacture of many types of industrial products of the food and processing industries. During 2011, the industrial enterprises of the raion produced UAH 99 million, 23 thousand. Marketable products (6% of the region's production). The main enterprises are Titan LLC, whose share in total production is 39%, Lad LLC — 29%, Kiliia Shipbuilding and Shiprepair Plant — 21%, Vylkivsky Fleet Repair and Maintenance Base — 6% and others.

=== Agriculture ===
Agriculture is one of the main branches of material production in the raion in terms of production and employment. It employs about 35% of the population, concentrates more than half of the production assets, produces 42% of gross domestic product, 80% of consumer goods. Due to the special climatic conditions, Kiliia raion belongs to the grain and livestock zone of production specialization of agriculture, where viticulture and pig breeding are actively developing. The share of the raion in the total volume of gross agricultural output in the region exceeds 5.3%, grain — 7.5%, sunflower — 8.1%, grapes — 45.5%, meat — 4.5%, milk — 4.8%, eggs — 6.3%. The share of plant products in the total gross agricultural output of the raion is 62%, livestock — 38%.

=== Education ===
There are 20 preschools, 6 out-of-school, and 23 secondary schools in the raion, including 8 in urban settlements and 15 in rural settlements. In summer, the raion children's health and recreation institution `Sputnik` works. General secondary education covered 6,903 students, preschool education — 1,133 pupils (43% of the number of preschool children), extracurricular education covered 3,321 pupils, expanded the number of clubs and sections of out-of-school institutions operating in villages.
