= Izmail Raion =

Subdivision of Odesa Oblast, Ukraine

Izmail Raion Ізмаїльський район
- Raion
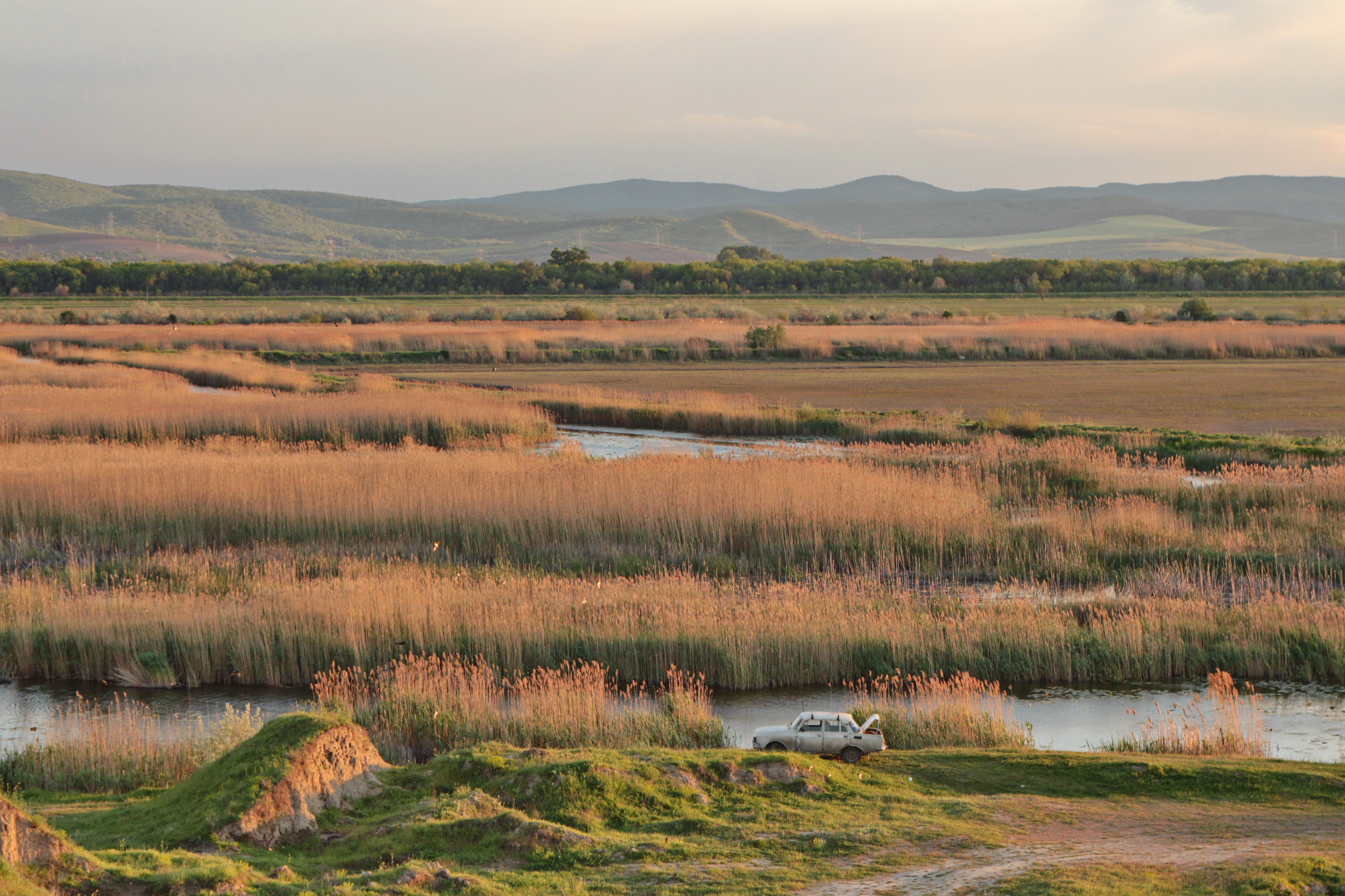

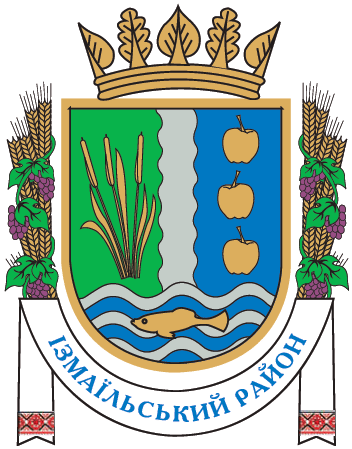
- Flag Coat of arms

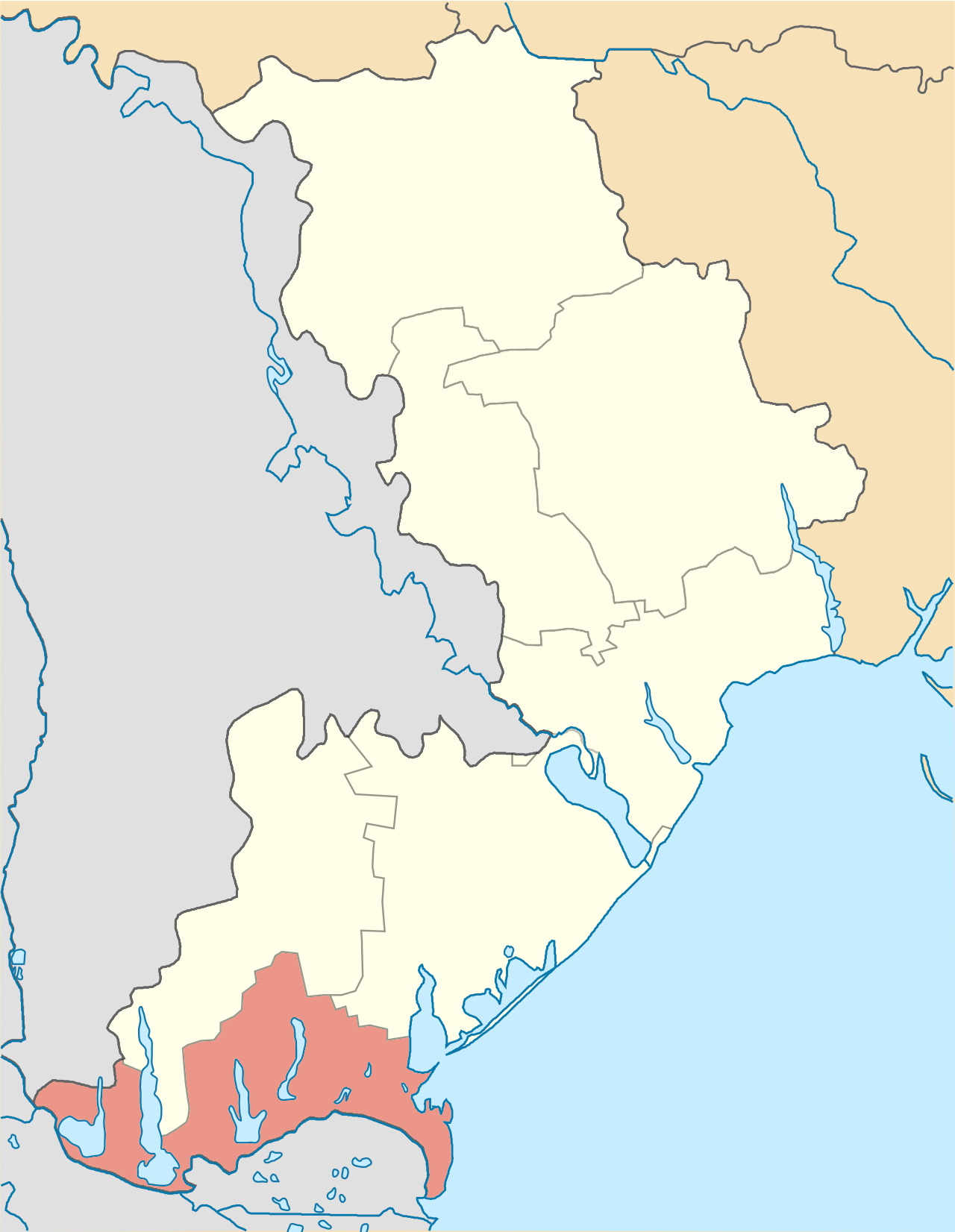
- Interactive map of Izmail Raion
- Coordinates: 45°28′59″N 28°55′43″E
- Country: Ukraine
- Oblast: Odesa Oblast
- Established: 1959
- Admin. center: Izmail
- Subdivisions: 6 hromadas

Government
  - Governor: Serhiy Pavluhin

Area: since July 2020
  - Total: 3,439.9 km^{2} (1,328.2 sq mi)

Population (2022)
  - Total: 204,745
  - Density: 59.521/km^{2} (154.16/sq mi)
- Time zone: UTC+02:00 (EET)
  - Summer (DST): UTC+03:00 (EEST)
- Postal index: 68640—68681
- Area code: +380
- Website: izmail-rda.od.gov.ua

Izmail Raion (Ukrainian: Ізмаїльський район, romanized: Izmailskyi raion; Bulgarian: Измаилски район; Romanian: Raionul Ismail) is a raion (administrative division) in Odesa Oblast in southwestern Ukraine. Its administrative center is the town of Izmail. It is in the historical region of Budjak in southern Bessarabia. Population: 204,745 (2022 estimate).

On 18 July 2020, as part of the administrative reform of Ukraine, the number of raions of Odesa Oblast was reduced to seven, and the area of Izmail Raion was significantly expanded. Two abolished raions, Kiliia and Reni Raions, as well as the city of Izmail, which was previously incorporated as a city of oblast significance and did not belong to the raion, were merged into Izmail Raion. The January 2020 estimate of the raion population was 50,568 (2020 est.).

In the 2001 Ukrainian Census, the raion, within its boundaries at that time, had a multi-ethnic population of 54,692, including 15,798 ethnic Ukrainians (28.89%), 15,083 self-identified Moldovans (27.58%), 14,072 Bulgarians (25.73%), 8,870 ethnic Russians (16.22%), 230 Gagauz (0.42%) and 34 self-identified Romanians (0.06%). Izmail Raion, within its boundaries at that time, had 54,692 inhabitants in 2001, including 26.34% Ukrainian-speakers, 26.21% Romanian-speakers, 21.56% Russian-speakers, 24.88% Bulgarian-speaking and 0.26% Gagauz-speaking.

== Administrative division ==
=== Current ===
After the reform in July 2020, the raion consisted of 6 hromadas:

- Izmail urban hromada with the administration in the city of Izmail, transferred from the city of oblast significance of Izmai;
- Kiliia urban hromada with the administration in the city of Kiliia, transferred from Kiliia Raion;
- Reni urban hromada with the administration in the city of Reni, transferred from Reni Raion;
- Safiany rural hromada with the administration in the village of Safiany, retained from Izmail Raion;
- Suvorove settlement hromada with the administration in the rural settlement of Katlabuh, retained from Izmail Raion;
- Vylkove urban hromada with the administration in the city of Vylkove, transferred from Kiliia Raion.

=== Before 2020 ===
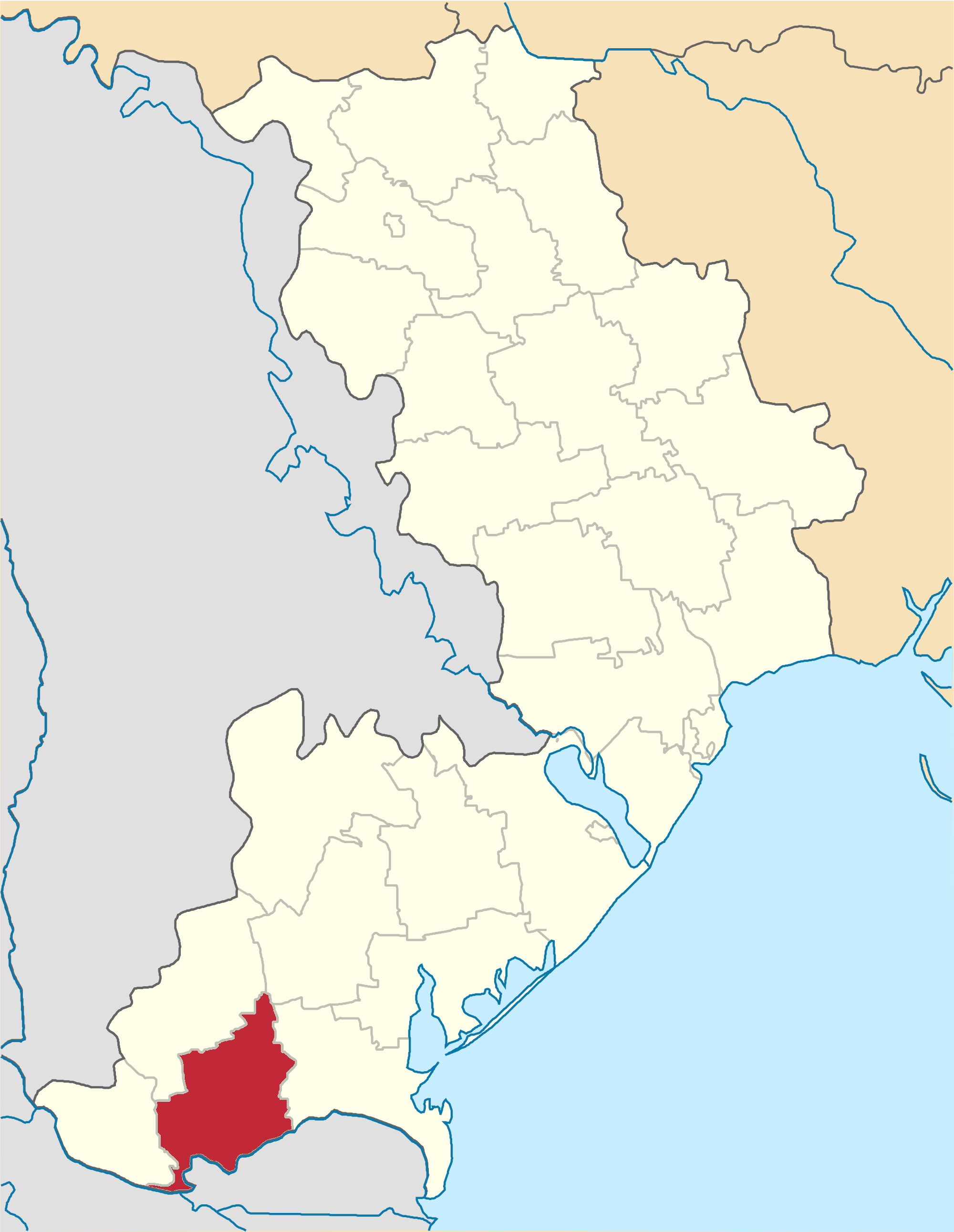
Izmail Raion in Odesa Oblast (1966-2020)

Before the 2020 reform, the raion consisted of two hromadas,

- Safiany rural hromada with the administration in Safiany;
- Suvorove settlement hromada with the administration in Suvorove.

== See also ==
- Izmail Oblast
