= Alvania alexandrae =

Scientific classification
- Kingdom: Animalia
- Phylum: Mollusca
- Class: Gastropoda
- Subclass: Caenogastropoda
- Order: Littorinimorpha
- Superfamily: Rissooidea
- Family: Rissoidae
- Genus: Alvania
- Species: †A. alexandrae

Binomial name
- †Alvania alexandrae O. Boettger, 1902

Synonyms
- † Actonia alexandrae (O. Boettger, 1902) superseded combination (Actonia regarded as a junior of Alvania); † Alvania (Actonia) alexandrae O. Boettger, 1902

Species of gastropod

Alvania alexandrae is an extinct species of small sea snail, first described by Otto Boettger in 1902 from fossils found in Romania. It belongs to the Rissoidae family.

== Distribution ==
Fossils of this marine species were found in Middle Miocene strata in Poland.

== Taxonomy and classification ==
Alvania alexandrae is a marine gastropod mollusk in the family Rissoidae, part of the order Littorinimorpha. The genus Alvania is known for its minute sea snails, with shells typically measuring between 1 mm and 7 mm, ovate-conical in shape, and featuring reticulated axial and spiral elements. The species was described by Otto Boettger in his 1902 publication Zur Kenntnis der Fauna der mittelmiocänen Schichten von Kostej im Krassó-Szörényer Komitat, which focused on the fauna of middle Miocene deposits in what is now Romania.

== Description and morphology ==
The length of the shell attains 3 mm, its diameter 1.5 mm.

== Habitat and distribution ==
Alvania alexandrae is known from fossil deposits in the middle Miocene layers of Kostej, located in the Krassó-Szörényer county, now part of Romania. During the middle Miocene, this region was submerged under the Paratethys Sea, a large marine basin that extended across Central and Eastern Europe.
