= Vexillum harmati =

Scientific classification
- Kingdom: Animalia
- Phylum: Mollusca
- Class: Gastropoda
- Subclass: Caenogastropoda
- Order: Neogastropoda
- Superfamily: Turbinelloidea
- Family: Costellariidae
- Genus: Vexillum
- Species: †V. harmati

Binomial name
- †Vexillum harmati Csepreghy-Meznerics, 1954

Synonyms
- † Vexillum (Costellaria) harmati Csepreghy-Meznerics, 1954

Species of gastropod

Vexillum harmati is an extinct species of sea snail, a marine gastropod mollusk, in the family Costellariidae, the ribbed miters.

== Description ==
The length of the shell attains 24 mm, its diameter 5.5 mm.

== Distribution ==
Fossils of this marine species were found in Miocene strata in the former Paratethys Sea.
