= Alvania holubicensis =

Scientific classification
- Kingdom: Animalia
- Phylum: Mollusca
- Class: Gastropoda
- Subclass: Caenogastropoda
- Order: Littorinimorpha
- Superfamily: Rissooidea
- Family: Rissoidae
- Genus: Alvania
- Species: †A. holubicensis

Binomial name
- †Alvania holubicensis Friedberg, 1923

Extinct species of gastropod

Alvania holubicensis is an extinct species of minute sea snail, a marine gastropod mollusk or micromollusk in the family Rissoidae.

== Distribution ==
Fossils have been found in Mid Miocene strata in the Central Paratethys.
