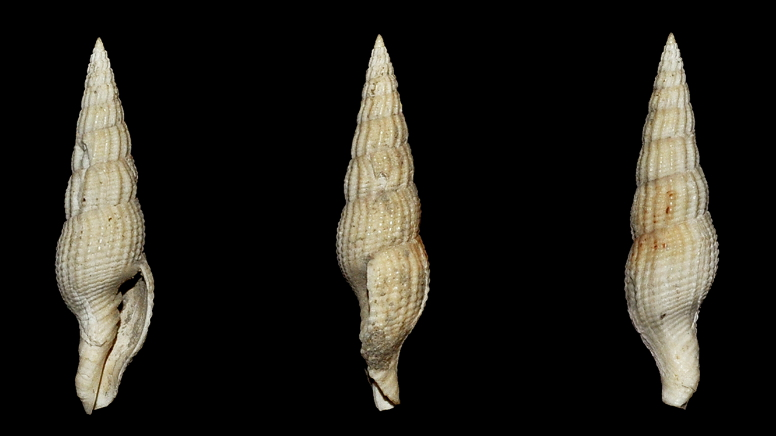
- Shell of † Vexillum michelottii (specimen at MNHN, Paris)

Scientific classification
- Kingdom: Animalia
- Phylum: Mollusca
- Class: Gastropoda
- Subclass: Caenogastropoda
- Order: Neogastropoda
- Superfamily: Turbinelloidea
- Family: Costellariidae
- Genus: Vexillum
- Species: †V. michelottii

Binomial name
- †Vexillum michelottii (M. Hörnes, 1852)

Synonyms
- † Mitra michelottii M. Hörnes, 1852; Turricula (Uromitra) michelottii (Hörnes, 1852)

= Vexillum michelottii =

Species of gastropod

Vexillum michelottii is an extinct species of sea snail, a marine gastropod mollusk, in the family Costellariidae, the ribbed miters.

== Distribution ==
Fossils of this marine species were found in Miocene strata of the Paratethys Sea; in Pliocene strata in the Alpes-Maritimes, France.
