= Alvania pseudalvania =

Scientific classification
- Kingdom: Animalia
- Phylum: Mollusca
- Class: Gastropoda
- Subclass: Caenogastropoda
- Order: Littorinimorpha
- Superfamily: Rissooidea
- Family: Rissoidae
- Genus: Alvania
- Species: †A. pseudalvania

Binomial name
- †Alvania pseudalvania (Andrusov, 1905)

Synonyms
- † Mohrensternia pseudalvania Andrusov, 1905 ·

Species of gastropod

Alvania pseudalvania is an extinct species of minute sea snail, a marine gastropod mollusk or micromollusk in the family Rissoidae.

Subspecies=

- † Alvania pseudalvania raricostata Iljina, 1976 (taxon inquirendum)

== Distribution ==
Fossils have been found in Mid Miocene strata in the Central Paratethys.
