= Salt mining =

Mining operation extracting rock salt or halite

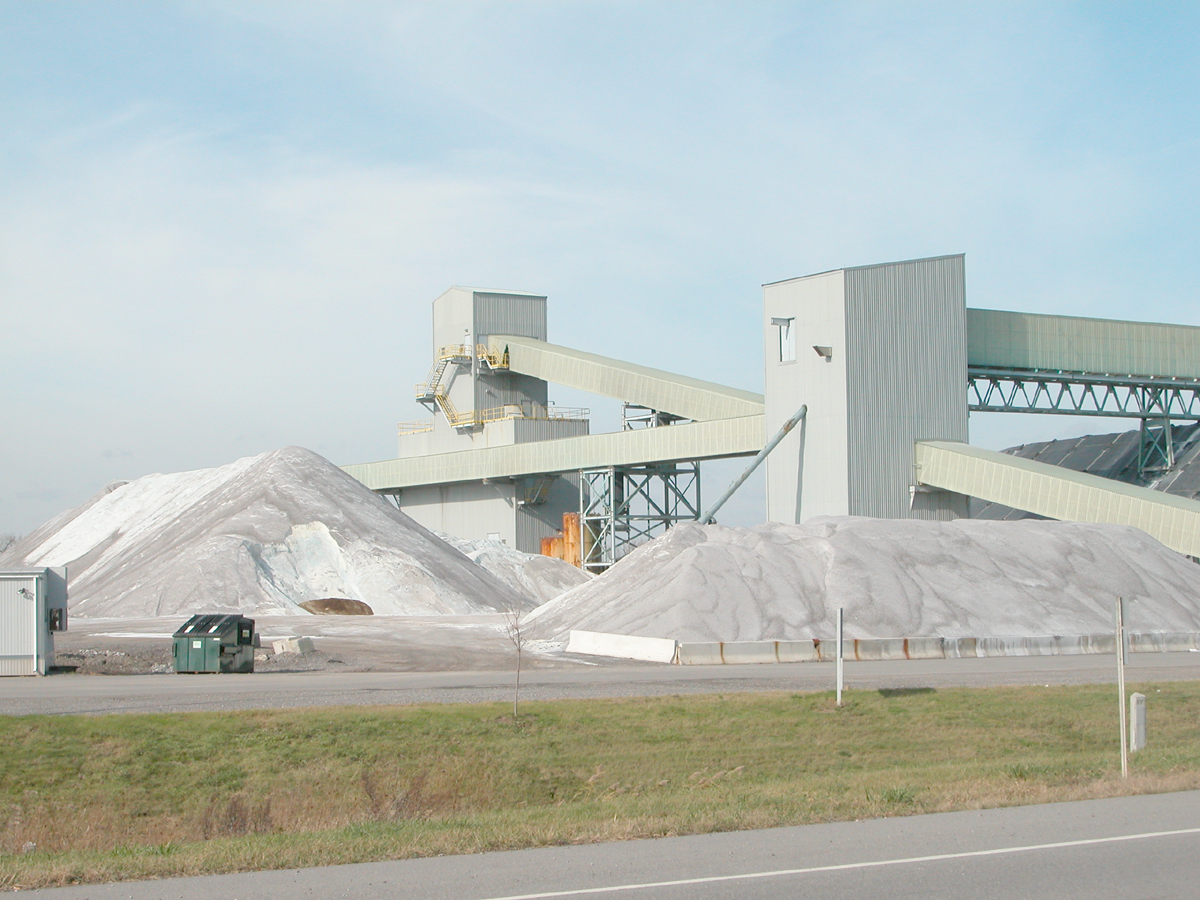
Modern rock-salt mine near Mount Morris, New York

Salt mining extracts natural salt deposits from underground. The mined salt is usually in the form of halite (commonly known as rock salt), and extracted from evaporite formations.

== History ==
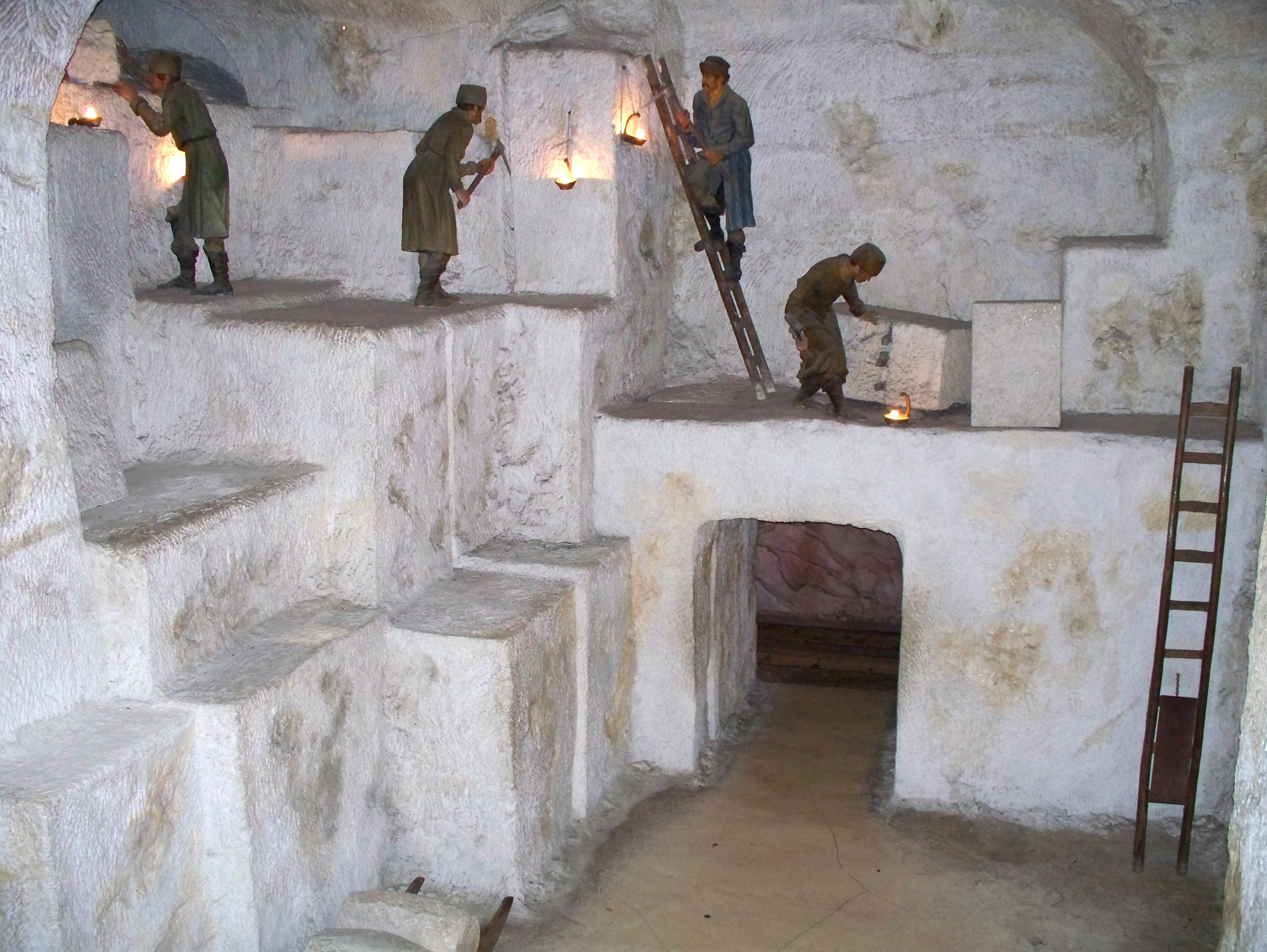
Diorama of an underground salt mine in Germany

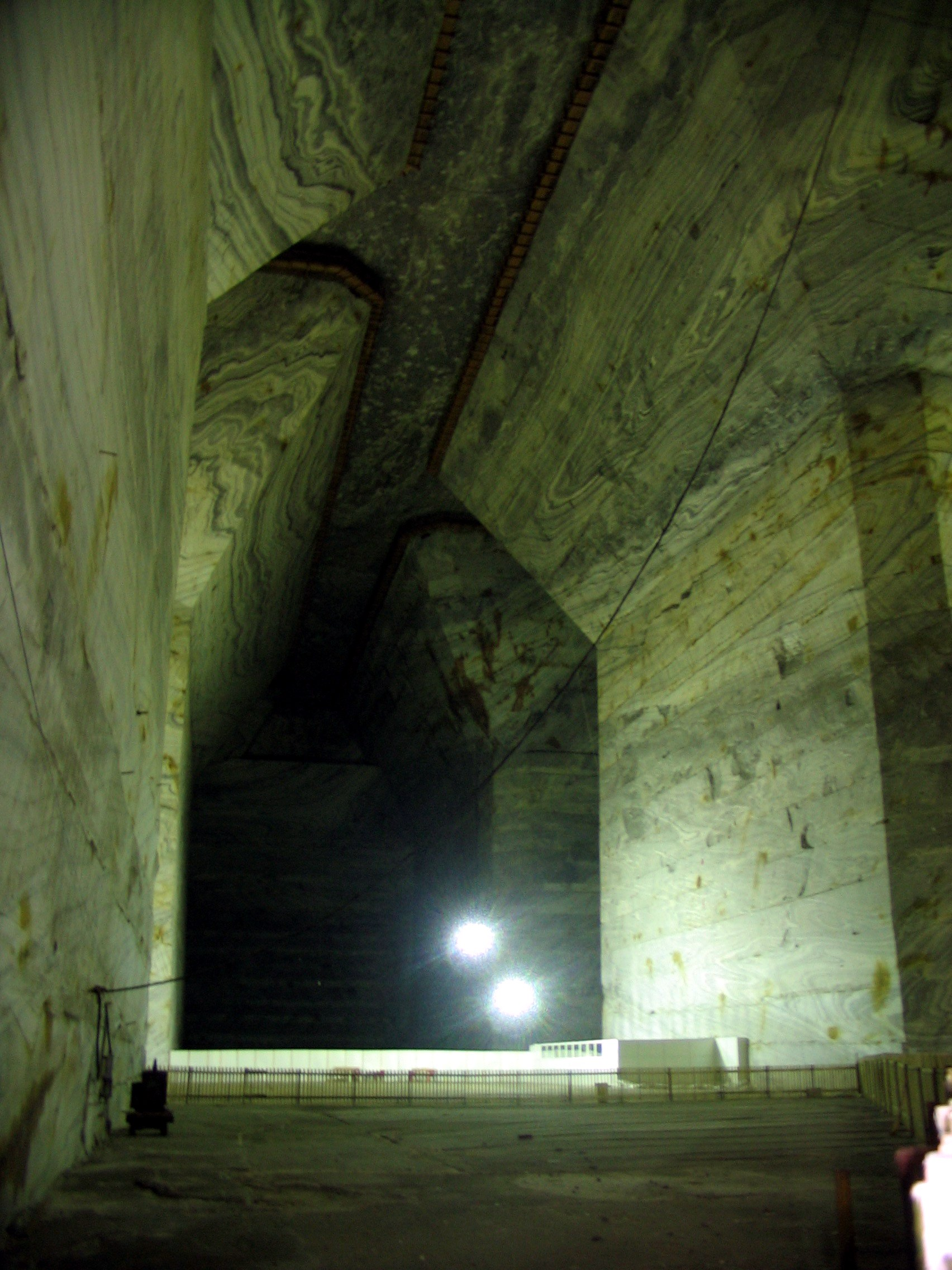
Inside Salina Veche, in Slănic, Prahova, Romania. The railing (lower middle) gives an idea of size.

Before the advent of the modern internal combustion engine and earth-moving equipment, mining salt was one of the most expensive and dangerous of operations because of rapid dehydration caused by constant contact with the salt (both in the mine passages and scattered in the air as salt dust) and of other problems caused by accidental excessive sodium intake. Salt is now plentiful, but until the Industrial Revolution, it was difficult to come by, and salt was often mined by slaves or prisoners. Life expectancy for the miners was low.

The earliest found salt mine was in Hallstatt, Austria where salt was mined, starting in 5000 BC.

As salt is a necessity of life, pre-industrial governments were usually keen to exercise stringent control over its production, often through direct ownership of the mines. Whereas the collection of most taxes generally required at least the grudging cooperation of the upper classes, ownership of salt mines could provide monarchs with a lucrative source of income for which they did not need to rely on the goodwill of other strata of society such as the nobility to remit to the monarch. For example, Polish king Casimir the Great relied on salt mines for over a third of his revenue in the 14th century.

Ancient China was among the earliest civilizations in the world with cultivation and trade in mined salt. They first discovered natural gas when they excavated rock salt. The Chinese writer, poet, and politician Zhang Hua of the Jin dynasty wrote in his book Bowuzhi how people in Zigong, Sichuan, excavated natural gas and used it to boil a rock salt solution. The ancient Chinese gradually mastered and advanced the techniques of producing salt. Salt mining was an arduous task for them, as they faced geographical and technological constraints. Salt was extracted mainly from the sea, and salt works in the coastal areas in late imperial China equated to more than 80 percent of national production. The Chinese made use of natural crystallization of salt lakes and constructed some artificial evaporation basins close to shore. In 1041, during the Song dynasty, a well with a diameter about the size of a bowl and several dozen feet deep was drilled for salt production. In Southwestern China, natural salt deposits were mined with bores that could reach to a depth of more than 1,000 m (3,300 ft), but the yields of salt were relatively low. Salt mining played a pivotal role as one of the most important sources of the Imperial Chinese government's revenue and state development.

Most modern salt mines are privately operated or operated by large multinational companies such as K+S, AkzoNobel, Cargill, and Compass Minerals.

== Mining regions around the world ==
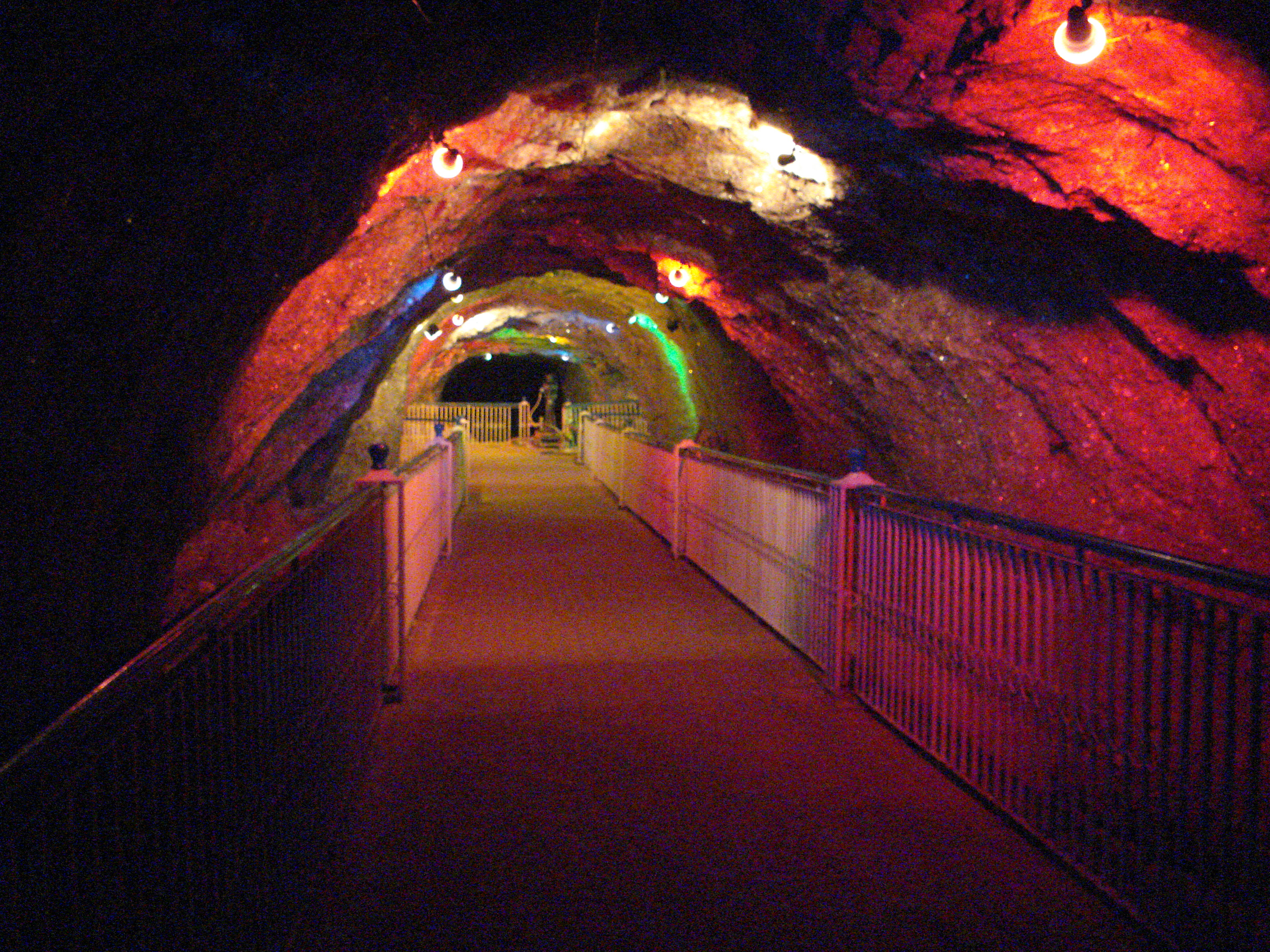
The Crystal Valley region of the Khewra Salt Mines in Pakistan. With around 250,000 visitors a year, the site is a major tourist attraction.

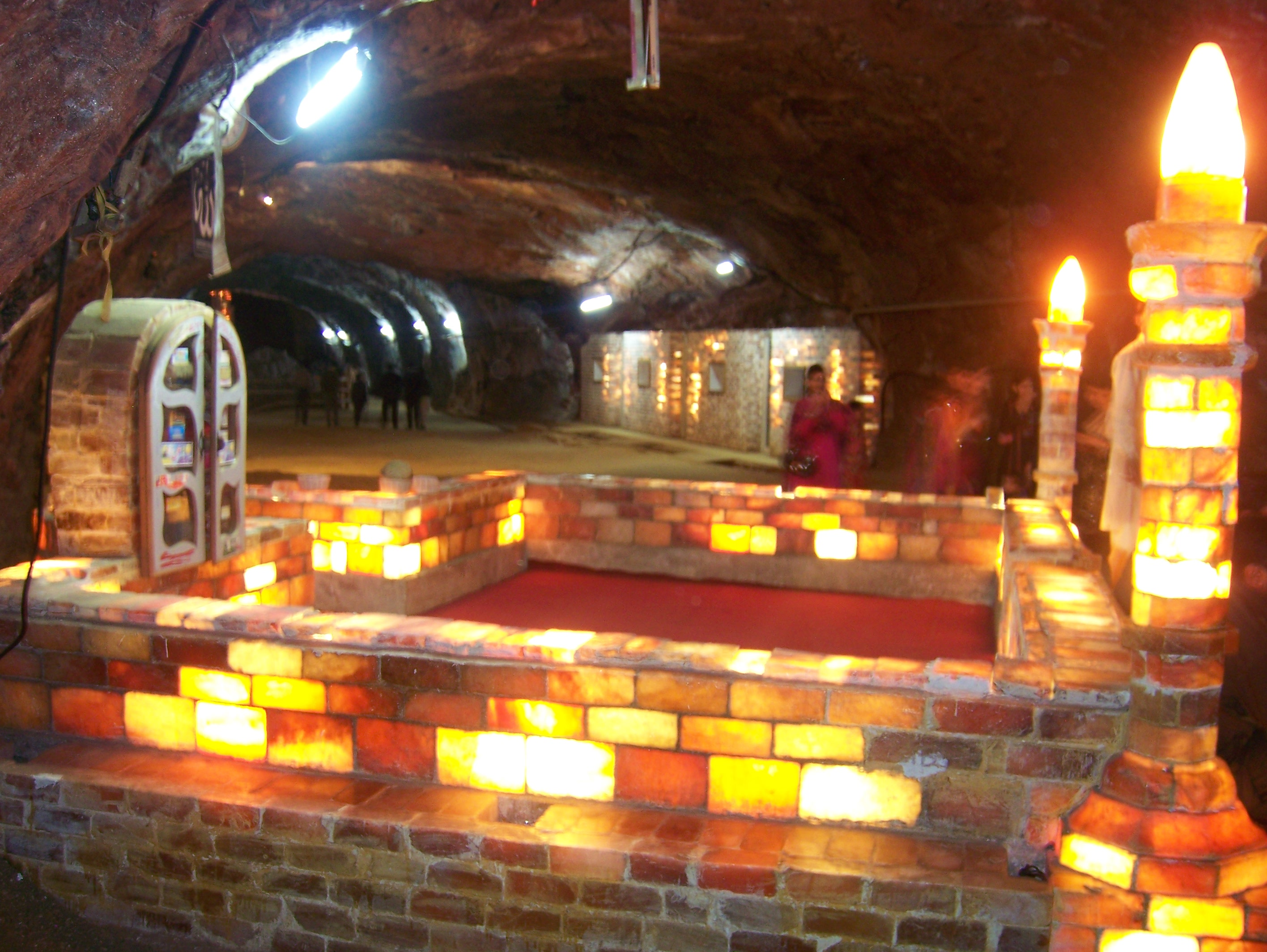
A small mosque made of salt bricks inside the Khewra Salt Mines complex

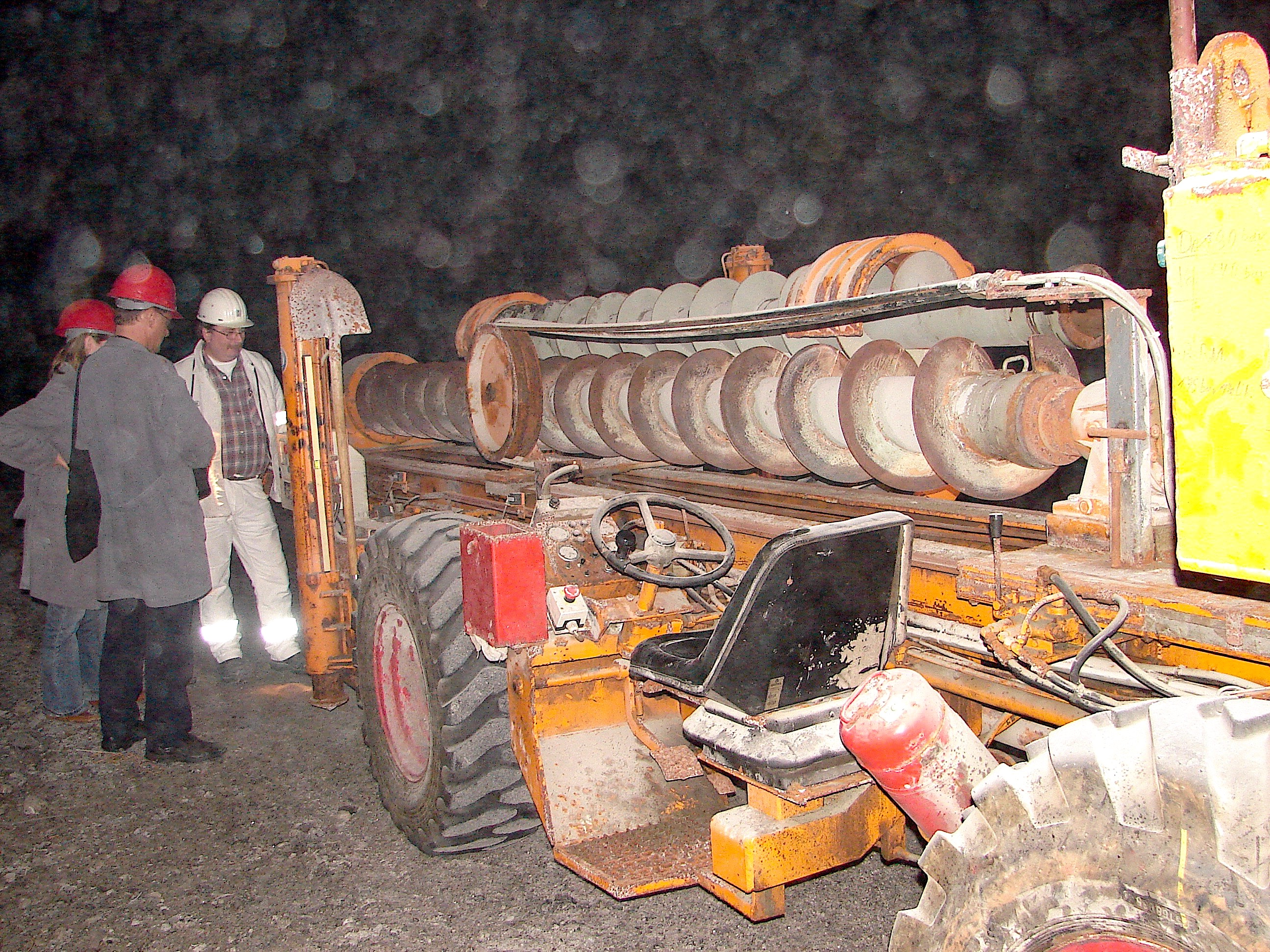
Large hole drilling rig for blast-hole drilling at salt mine Haigerloch-Stetten

Some notable salt mines include:

Country	Site(s)
Austria	Hallstatt and Salzkammergut.
Bosnia and Herzegovina	Tuzla
Bulgaria	Provadiya; and Solnitsata, an ancient town which Bulgarian archaeologists regard as the oldest in Europe and the site of a salt-production facility approximately six millennia ago.
Canada	Sifto Salt Mine in Goderich, Ontario, which, at 2.4 km (1.5 mi) wide and 3.2 km (2 mi) long, is one of the largest salt mines in the world extending 7 km^{2} (2.7 sq mi).
Colombia	Zipaquirá
England	The "-wich towns" of Cheshire and Worcestershire.
Ethiopia, Eritrea, Djibouti	Danakil Desert, where manual labor is used.
Germany	Rheinberg, Berchtesgaden, Heilbronn
Republic of Ireland	Mountcharles
Italy	Racalmuto, Realmonte and Petralia Soprana within the production sites managed by Italkali.
Morocco	Société de Sel de Mohammedia (Mohammedia Rock Salt company) near Casablanca
Northern Ireland	Kilroot, near Carrickfergus, more than a century old and containing passages whose combined length exceeds 25 km (16 mi).
Pakistan	Khewra Salt Mines, the world's second largest salt-mining operation, spanning over 300 km (190 mi). It was first discovered by a horse of Alexander the Great. The mine is still operation till today.
Poland	Wieliczka and Bochnia, both established in the mid-13th century and still operating, mostly as museums. Kłodawa Salt Mine.
Romania	Slănic (with Salina Veche, Europe's largest salt mine), Cacica, Ocnele Mari, Salina Turda, Târgu Ocna, Ocna Sibiului, Praid and Salina Ocna Dej.
Russia	Solikamsk in Perm Krai (European Russia); Seregovo in the Komi Republic (European Russia)
Ukraine	Soledar Salt Mine in Soledar, Donetsk oblast.
United States	Hutchinson, Kansas, underground mining began at Hutchinson in 1923 as the Carey Salt Company. In 1990 the Hutchinson Salt Company formed, then purchased the mine. In 2005 the Strataca salt mine museum and Underground Vaults & Storage constructed a new 200 m (650 ft) shaft to an older part of the mine for tours and storage. Also, Lyons Salt Company and Compass Minerals is located in Lyons, Kansas, and Independent Salt Company is located in Kanopolis, Kansas.; Avery Island, Louisiana; Cleveland, Ohio is home to the Whiskey Island mine owned by Cargill. The Fairport Harbor mine owned by Morton Salt is located 48 km (30 mi) to the east.; Detroit, Michigan, 340 m (1,100 ft) beneath which the Detroit Salt Company's 6 km^{2} (1,500-acre) subterranean complex extends; Livingston County, New York, location of American Rock Salt, the largest operating salt mine in the United States with a capacity for producing up to 18,000 tons each day.; Syracuse, New York earned the nickname "The Salt City" for its salt mining, an activity that continues in the region to the present day.; Grand Saline, Texas has a Morton Salt mine. It is one of the largest in the world.; Saltville, Virginia, the site of one of the Confederacy's main saltworks.

== Idiomatic use ==
In slang, the term salt mines, and especially the phrase back to the salt mines, refers ironically to one's workplace, or a dull or tedious task. This phrase originates from c. 1800 in reference to the Russian practice of sending prisoners to forced labor in Siberian salt mines.

== See also ==
Salt mines

- Khewra
- Schacht Asse II
- Turda
- Wieliczka
- Windsor

General

- Salt evaporation pond
- Brine mining
- Injection well
- Salt lake
- Salt dome
- Miner
- Coal mines and saltworks of Gouhenans
- Grozon coal and saltworks
- Coal mines and saltworks of Saulnot
