= Salina Turda =

Romanian salt mine and heritage site

Coordinates: 46.5877084°N 23.7873963°E

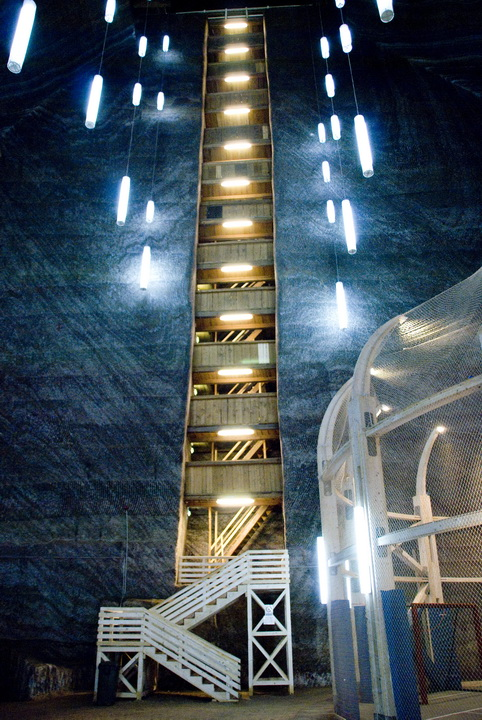
Rudolf hall is 80 m long, 50 m wide and 40 m high.

Salina Turda (Hungarian: tordai sóbánya) is a salt mine in the Durgău-Valea Sărată area of Turda, the second largest city in Cluj County, northwest Transylvania. Opened for tourists in 1992, the Salina Turda mine was visited by about 618,000 Romanian and foreign tourists in 2017.

Salina Turda was ranked in 2013 by Business Insider as among the "25 hidden gems around the world that are worth the trek".

== History ==
Salt was first extracted here during antiquity. The mine continuously produced table salt from the Middle Ages, the mine being first mentioned in 1271, to the early–20th century (1932).

The first document that speaks explicitly about the existence of a salt mine in Turda dates from 1 May 1271, being issued by the Hungarian chancellery. Documents preserved from the 13th and 14th centuries that refer to the Turda salt mines mention that salines were arranged in the Băile Sărate microdepression and on the southeastern slope of the Valea Sărată. Operating rooms were placed at the sites of current salt lakes from the areas mentioned above. In the 17th century the first salt mining works began on the north-western slope of Valea Sărată, as evidenced by shafts in the dome of the Terezia room. Shortly after, the Sfântul Anton mine was opened, where mining activity continued until it was closed in 1932. During World War II, it was used as a shelter and was afterwards temporarily used as a cheese storage center.

=== Renovation ===
In 1992, Salina Turda reopened as a halotherapy center and a popular tourist attraction. In 2008, the salt mine was modernized and improved under the program PHARE 2005 ESC large regional/local infrastructure, worth €5,888,000. It was reopened for tourism in January 2010.

== Main attractions ==
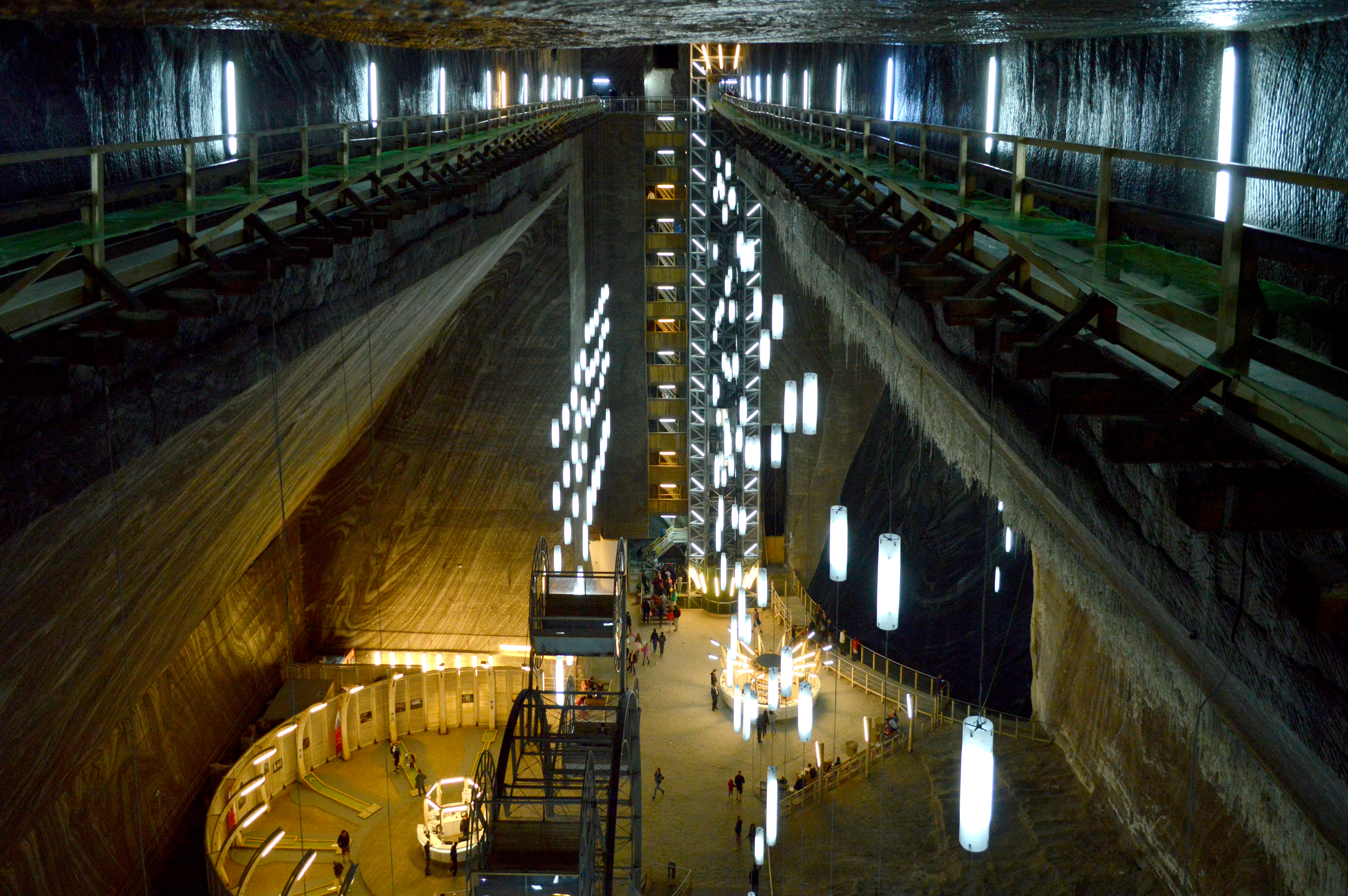
The main hall with salt stalactites on the left side

=== Iosif mine ===
The Iosif Mine can be visited through the balconies carved in salt. It is next to the Franz Josef Gallery. This mine is a conical chamber 112 metres (367 ft) deep and 67 metres (220 ft) wide at the base. Because of its shape and lack of communication with the other major mining points, this mine has a powerful echo, leading to it being called the "Echoes Room".

=== Crivac room ===
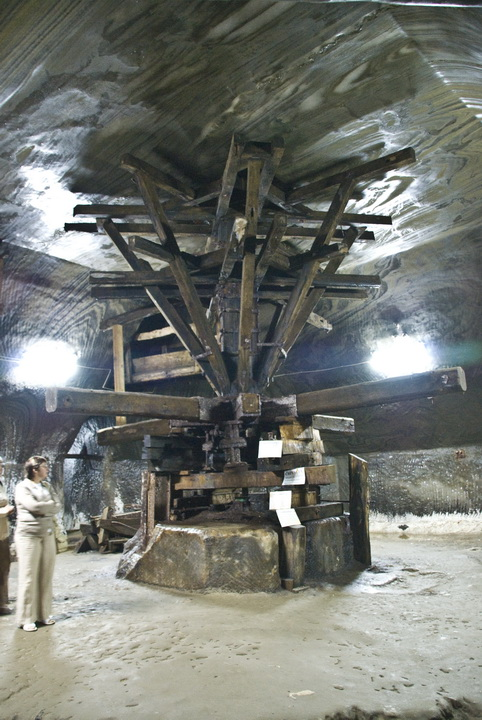
The crivac is one of the main points of interest in the salt mine.

The octagonal room hosts a winch called "crivac" or "gepel", rudimentary machinery used to lift salt rocks on the surface. It dates from 1881. This machine replaced another, smaller in size, that was installed in 1864. It is the only machine of its kind, in all the salt mines in Romania and probably in Europe, that remains in its original location.

=== Terezia mine ===
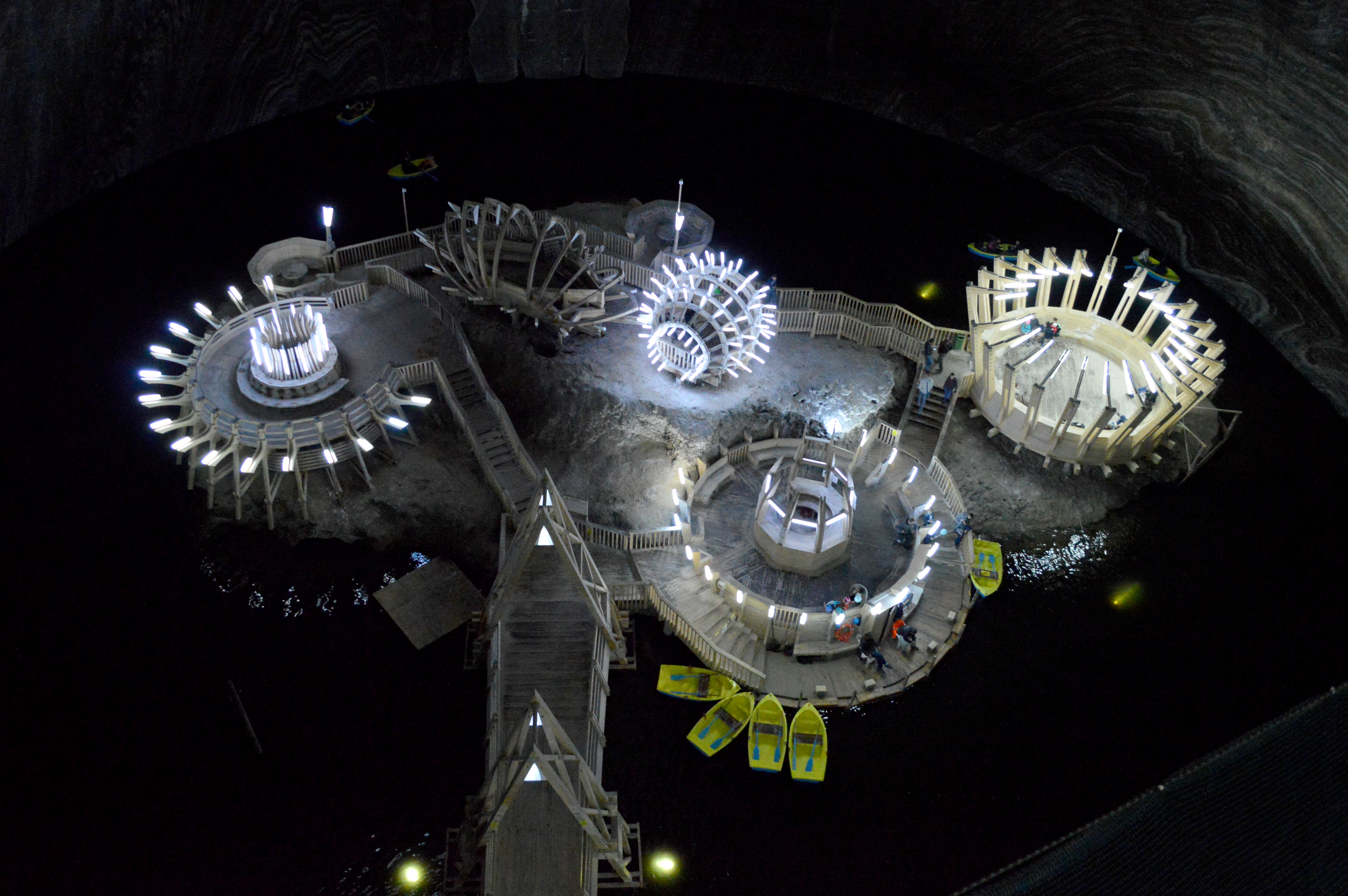
Salina Turda – view of the underground lake and UFO-shaped constructions

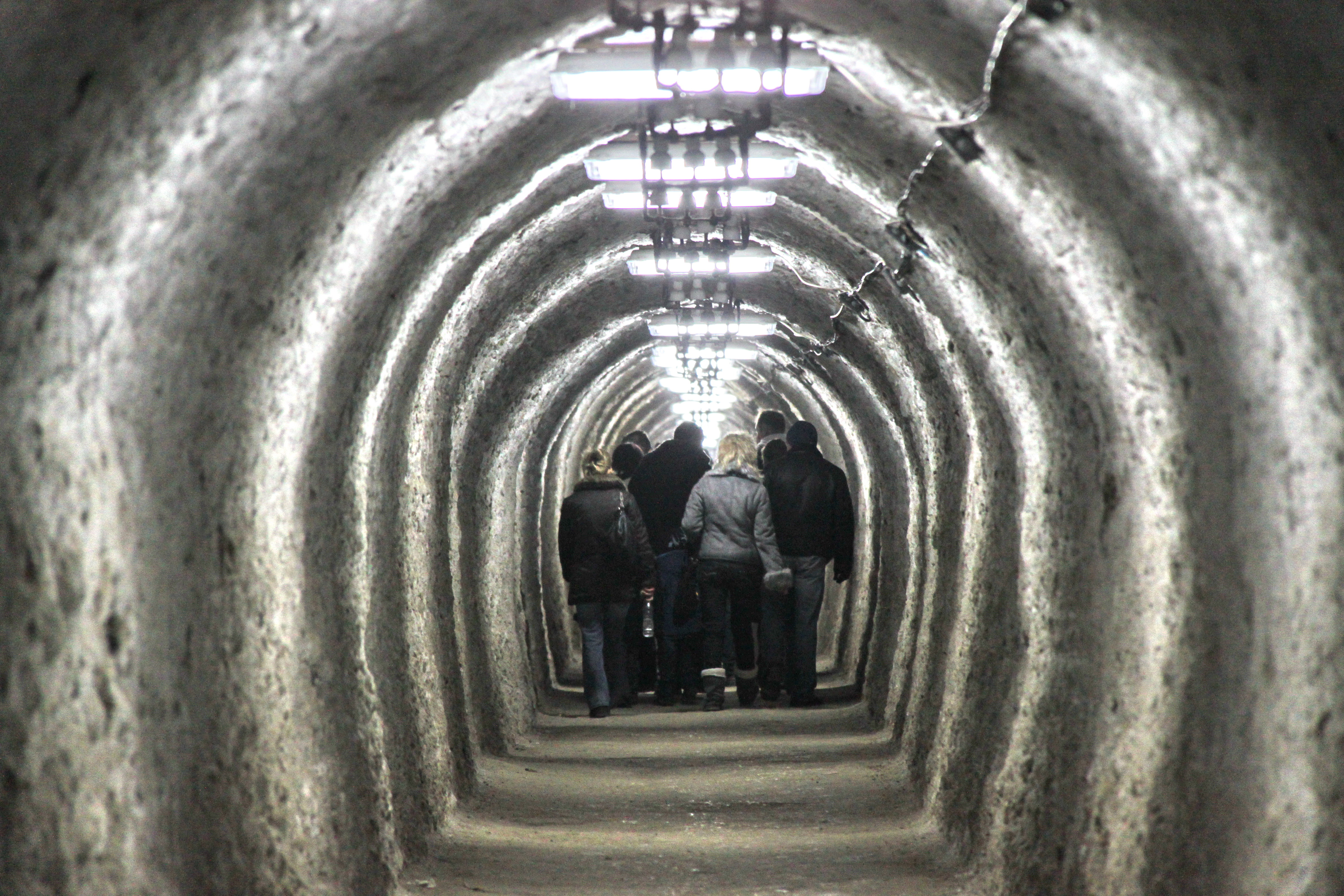
The access tunnel

This is a conical mine (bell mine). Salt mining in this type of room left behind underground halls of impressive dimensions: 90 metres (300 ft) height and 87 metres (285 ft) diameter. The depth from the mouth of the shafts to the base of the mine is 112 metres (367 ft). A "cascade of salt", an underground lake, stalactites, and salt efflorescences complete the inert equilibrium of the giant bell. The underground lake is between 0.5 and 8 metres (1.6 and 26.2 ft) deep and occupies about 80 percent of the operating room hearth area. In the center of the lake there is an island formed from residual low-grade salt deposited here after 1880, the year when salt mining ended in this room.

=== Rudolf mine ===
42 metres (138 ft) deep, 50 metres (160 ft) wide, and 80 metres (260 ft) long, Rudolf mine is the last place where salt was mined in Turda. Through the compartment of access, 172 steps lead to the mine hearth. On the walls of each of the 13 "floors" is marked the year when the respective level was opened. Formed over the years on the northwestern ceiling are salt stalactites, some even 3 metres (10 ft) long. The panoramic elevator offers tourists an overview of the whole mine.

=== Gizela mine ===
The Gizela mine and technical rooms in the northeastern extremity of the salt mine are similar to those of the Rudolf mine but much smaller because the salt exploration stopped shortly after the opening of this mine. Currently this mine serves as a spa treatment room with natural aerosols.

The underground gallery of this mine constitutes a geological reserve, with no access allowed to tourists. It is 15 metres (49 ft) above the transport gallery (Franz Josef gallery). Infiltrations of water in the extraction pit determined the deposits of efflorescences and formation of stalactites, and in the lake that partially covers the hearth of the room are salt crystals. The room has received the tourist name of Crystal Hall.

== Gallery ==
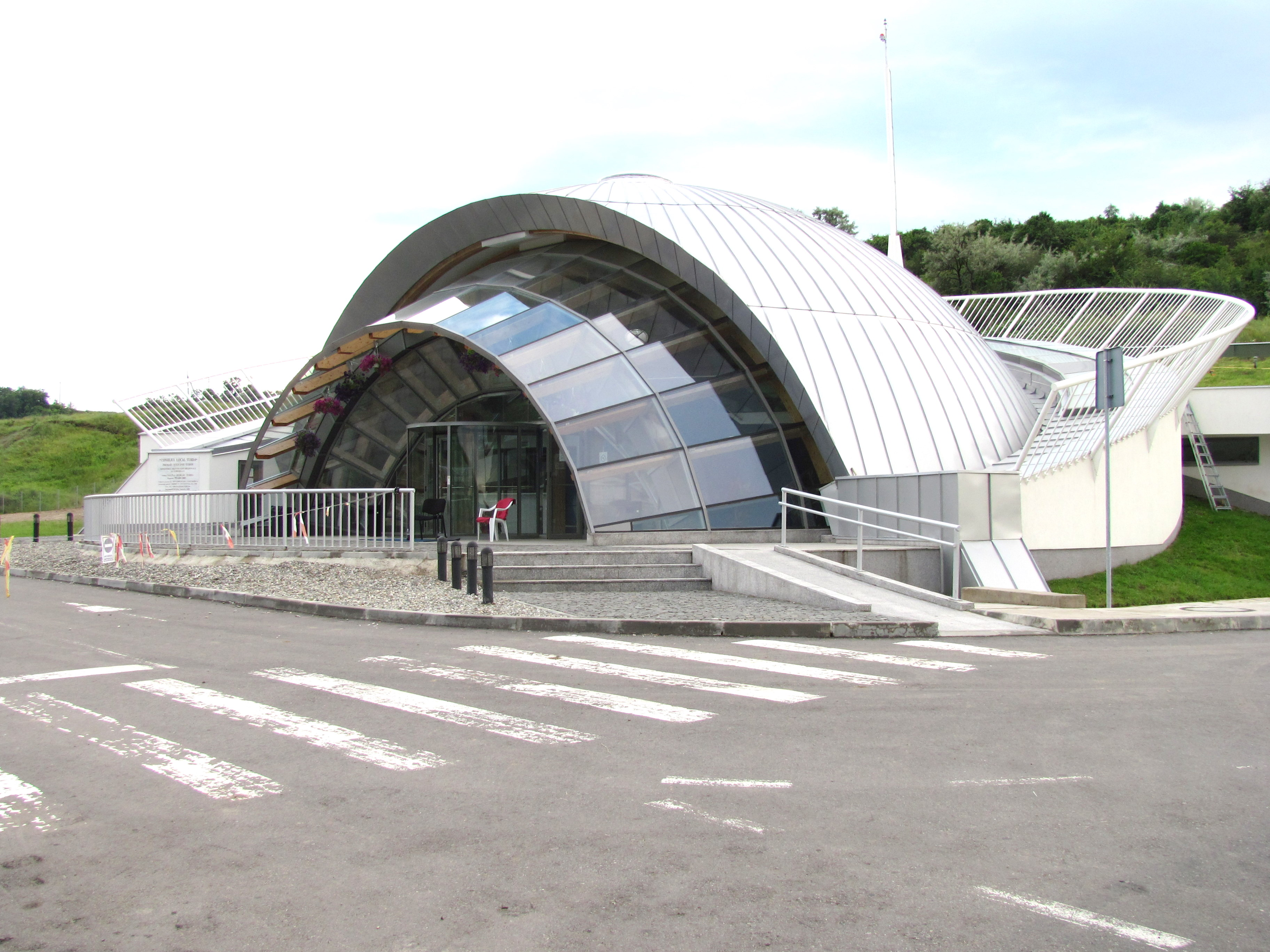
The new entrance

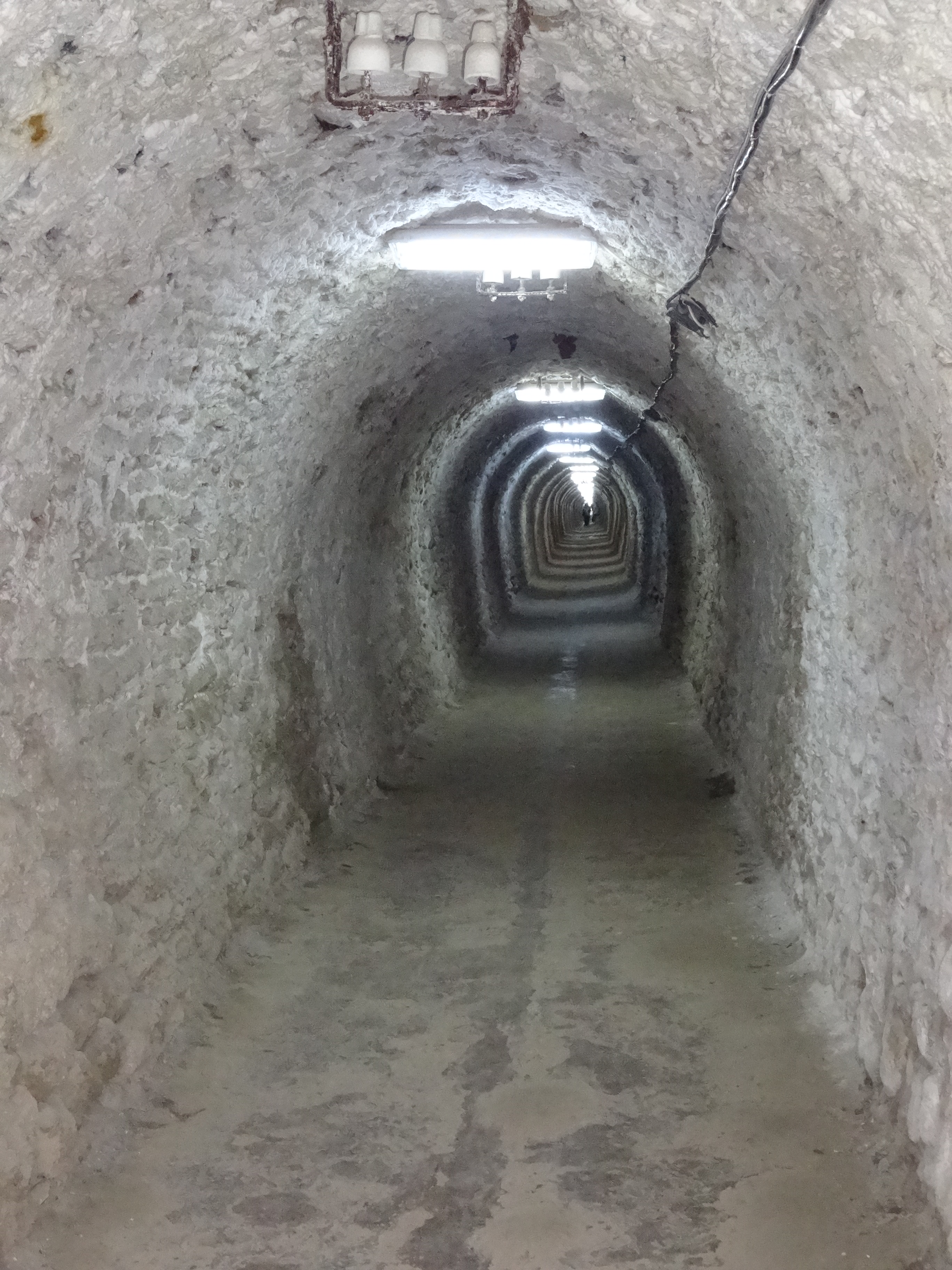
Franz Josef (old entrance)

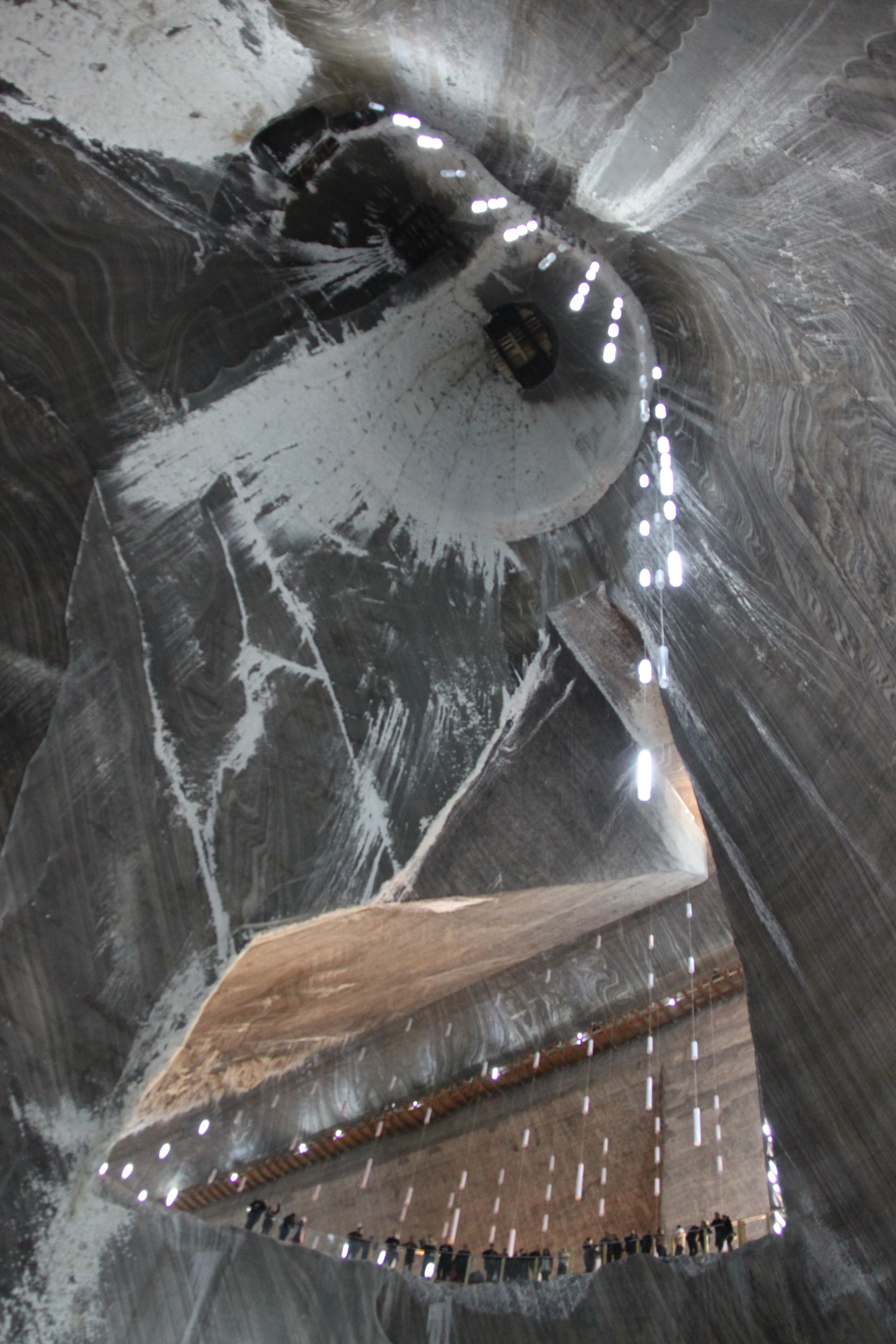

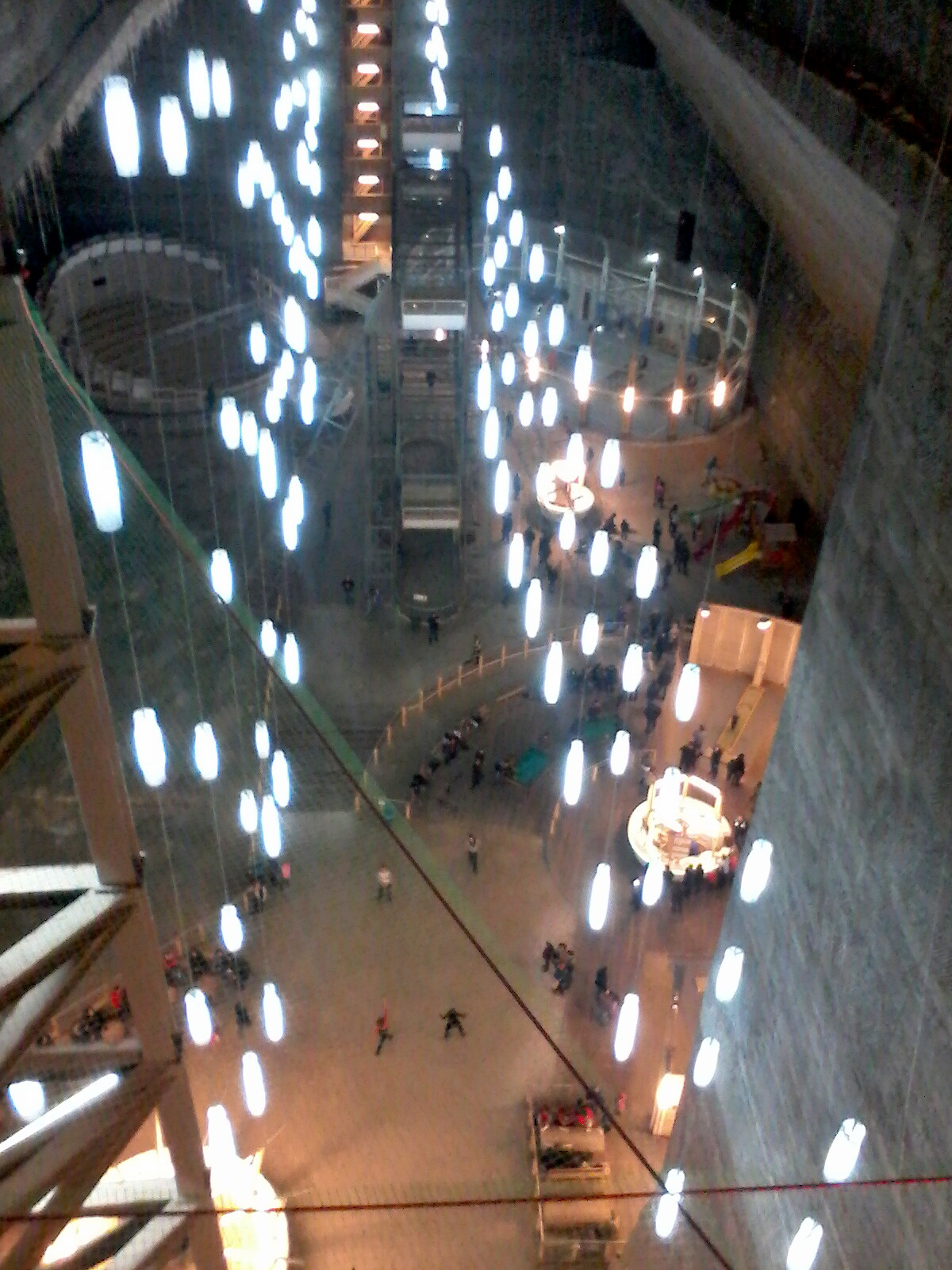

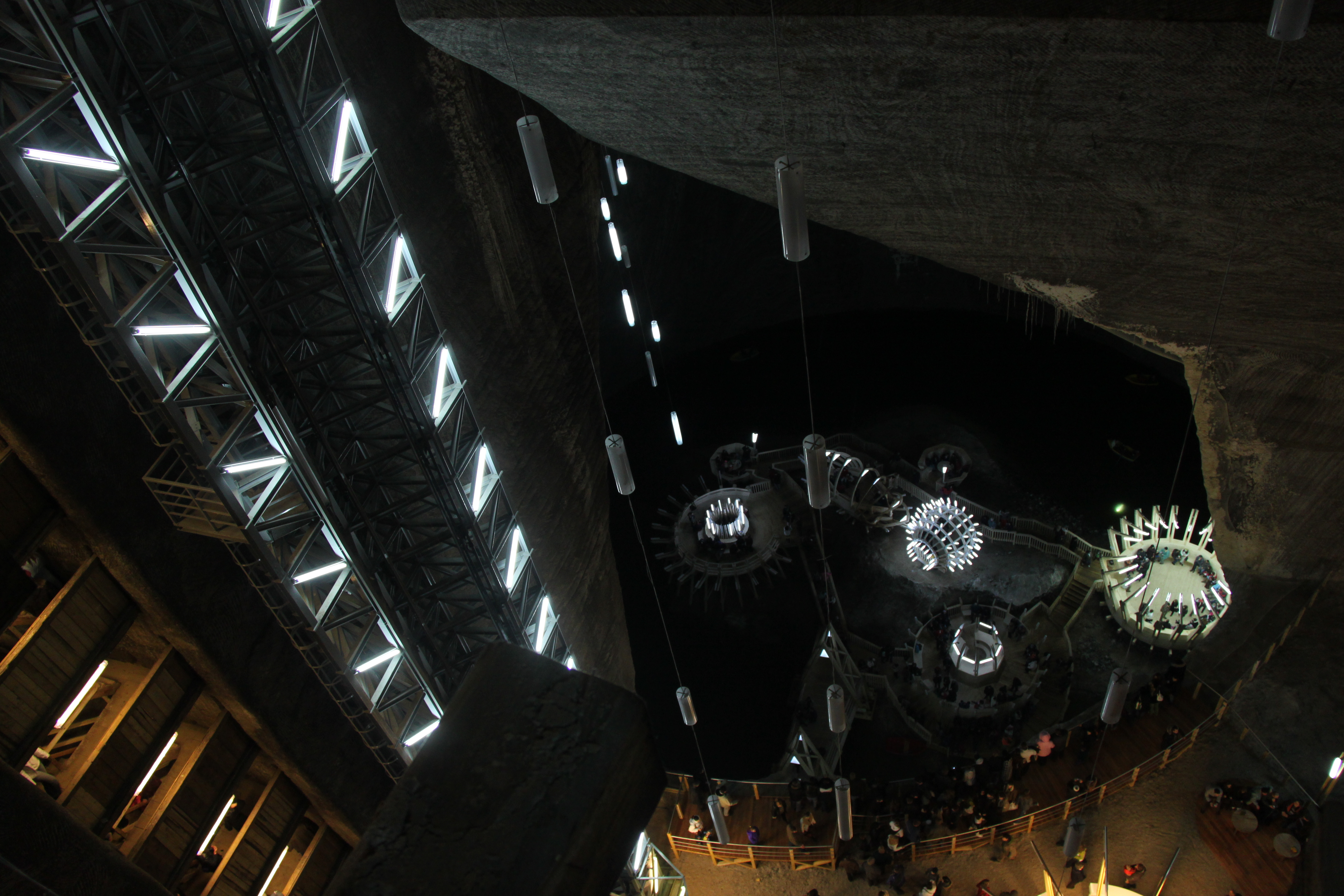

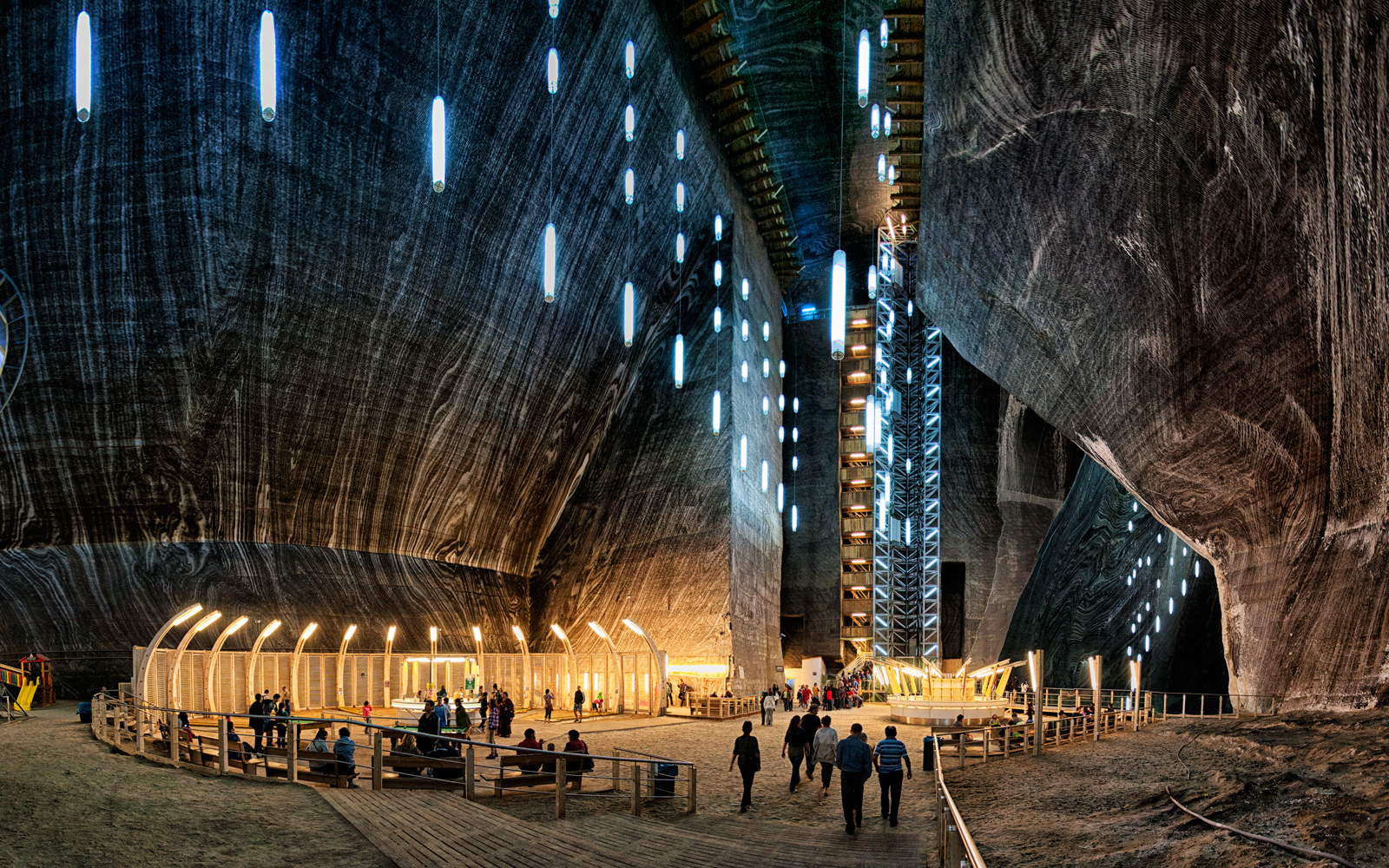

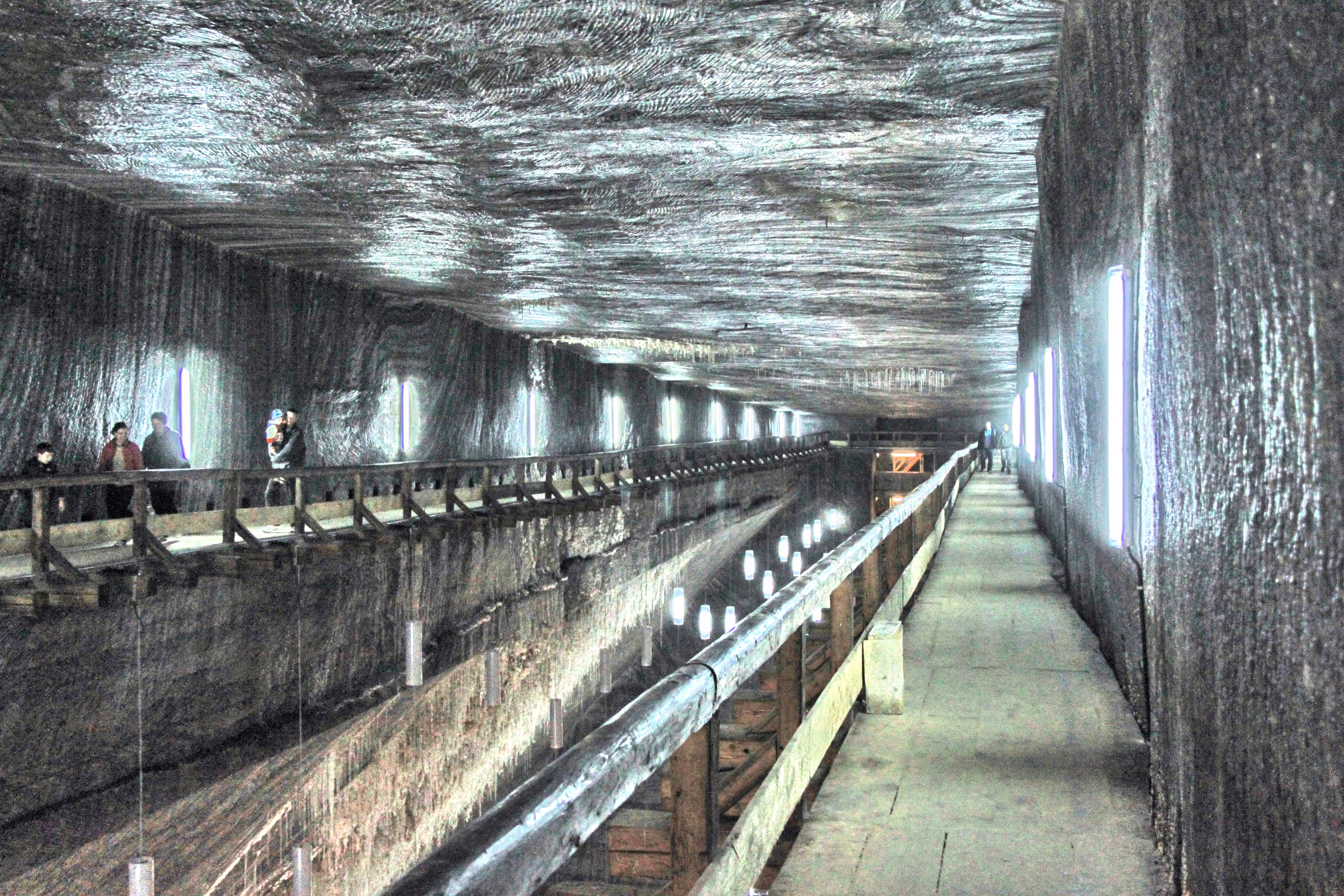

== See also ==
- Seven Wonders of Romania
- Salt therapy
- Praid salt mines
- Slănic Prahova salt mine
- Ocnele Mari salt mine
- Târgu Ocna salt mine
- Cacica salt mine
