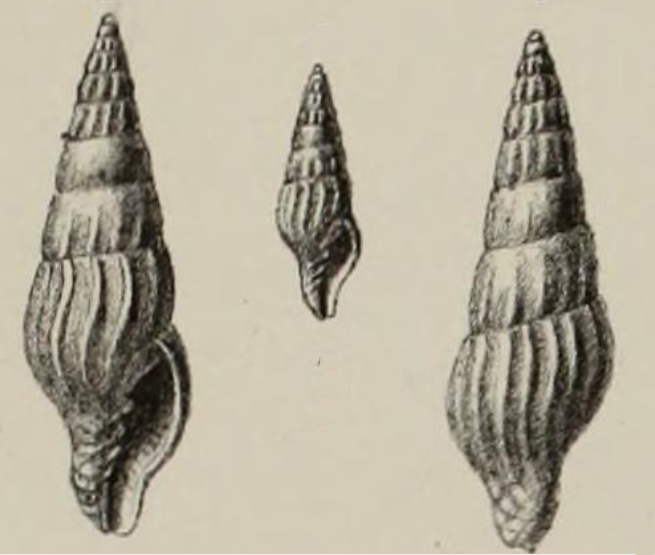
- Drawing of a shell of Vexillum intermittens (holotype)

Scientific classification
- Kingdom: Animalia
- Phylum: Mollusca
- Class: Gastropoda
- Subclass: Caenogastropoda
- Order: Neogastropoda
- Superfamily: Turbinelloidea
- Family: Costellariidae
- Genus: Vexillum
- Species: †V. intermittens

Binomial name
- †Vexillum intermittens (R. Hoernes & Auinger, 1880)

Synonyms
- † Mitra (Costellaria) intermittens R. Hoernes & Auinger, 1880

= Vexillum intermittens =

Species of gastropod

Vexillum intermittens is an extinct species of sea snail, a marine gastropod mollusk, in the family Costellariidae, the ribbed miters.

== Description ==
The length of the shell varies between 11 mm and 18 mm, its diameter between 3.5 mm and 5 mm.

== Distribution ==
Fossils of this marine species were found in Miocene strata in the former Paratethys Sea.
