= Seregovo mine =

Salt mine in Komi, Russia

Seregovo
- Location: Russia
- Products: Sodium chloride

The Seregovo is a large salt mine located in north-western Russia in Komi Republic. Seregovo represents one of the largest salt reserves in Russia having estimated reserves of 5 billion tonnes of NaCl.

Seregovo has been a center of salt production since the 16th century.
