= Ocna Mureș mine =

Salt mine in central Romania

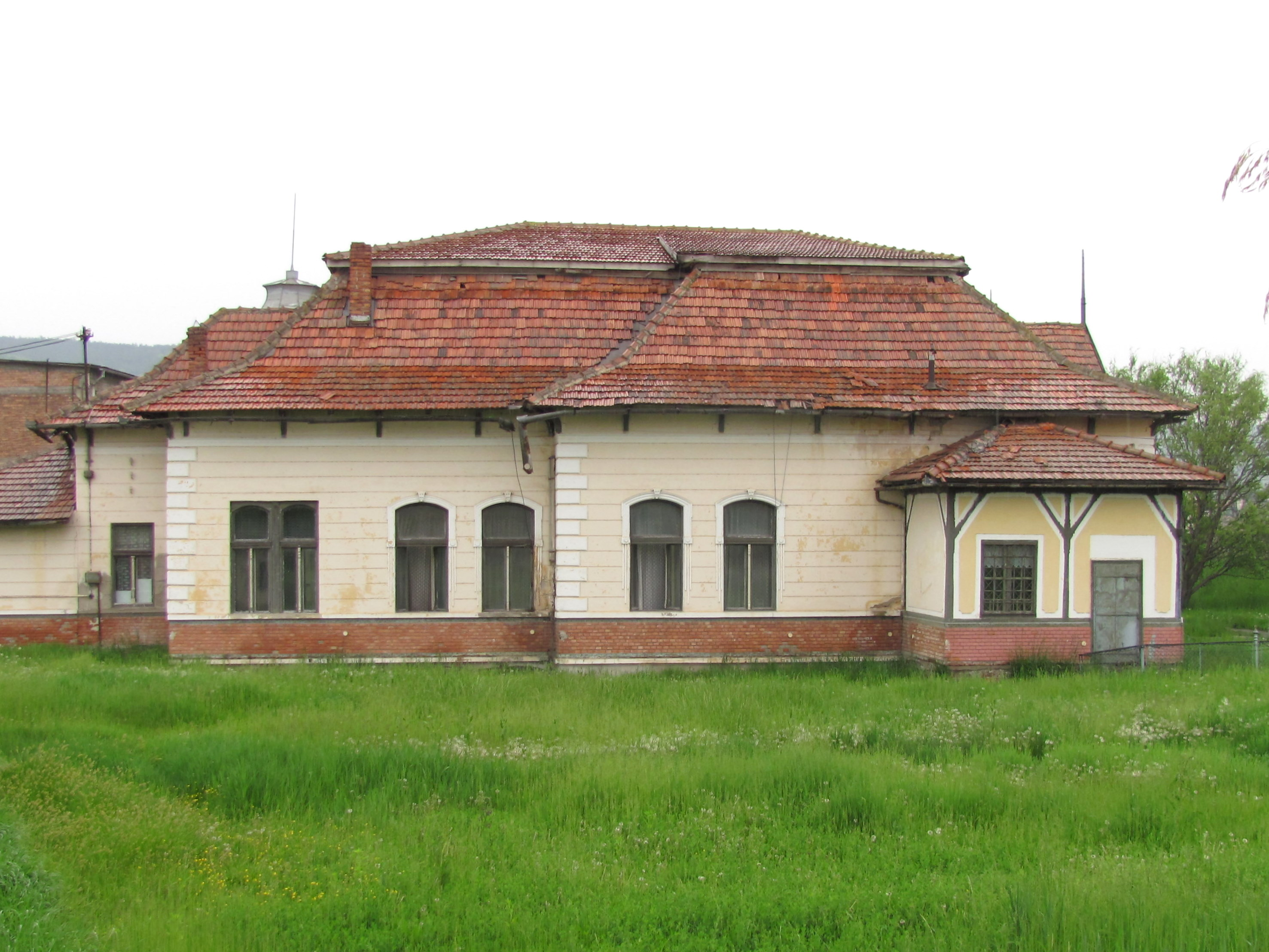

- Location within Romania
- Location: Ocna Mureș, Alba County, Romania; 46°23′13.52″N 23°51′26.93″E
- Products: Sodium chloride
- Company: Salrom

The Ocna Mureș mine is a large salt mine located in central Romania in Alba County, close to Ocna Mureș. Ocna Mureș represents one of the largest salt reserves in Romania having estimated reserves of 200 million tonnes of NaCl.
