= Slănic mine =

Old salt mine in Prahova, Romania

Coordinates: 45°14′8″N 25°56′33″E

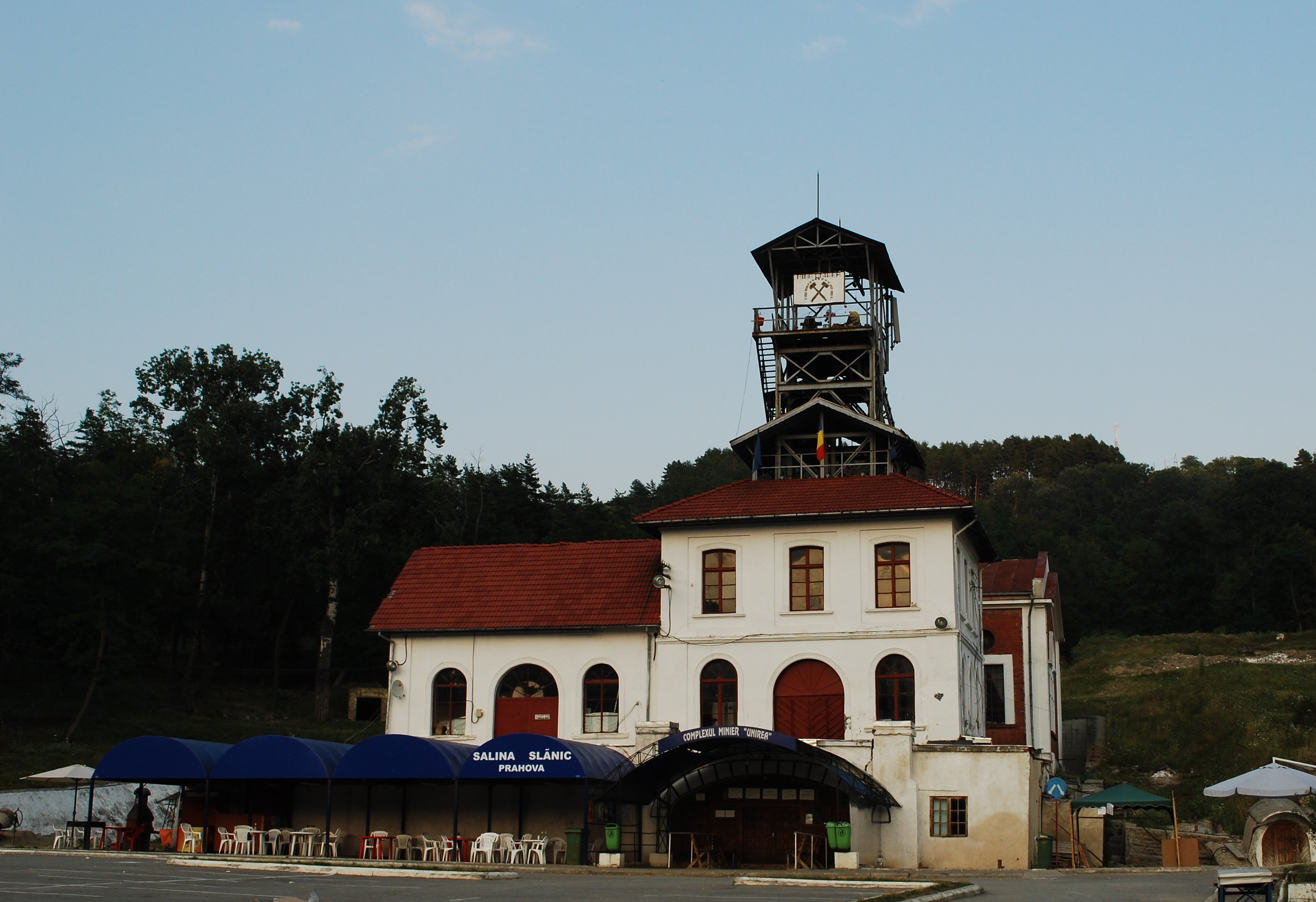
- Slănic Salt Mine

- Location within Romania
- Location: Slănic, Prahova, Romania
- Products: Rock salt, brine
- Opened: 1688
- Company: Societatea Națională a Sării „Salrom S.A.”
- Website: Slănic Salt Mine

Slănic mine is an old salt mine, located in Slănic, Prahova County, Romania, 100 kilometres (62 mi) north of Bucharest. The salt mine is closed for extraction purposes, but is open for visitors, featuring a microclimate with natural air-conditioning and constant temperature and atmospheric pressure throughout the year. It is made up of two levels, named Unirea and Mihai. Many of the visitors come for its supposed healing effects due to the purity of the air. Throughout the mine visitors will find various types of equipment for recreational activity such as playground equipment and some ping-pong tables. One area is sectioned off and is used for medical patients with lung cancer to come and rest in. The main elevator shaft is unique in that it has no metallic parts due to rust. After an elevator accident in 2014, minivans are used to spiral visitors up and down.

== History ==
In 1685 Spătar Mihai Cantacuzino purchased the Slănic estate with the intention of opening a salt mine. The mine was opened on Valea Verde in 1688. Other mines were established in Baia Baciului between 1689 and 1691. In 1713 Cantacuzino donated the mines and the estate to the Colțea Monastery from Bucharest. Wishing to modernize the mines in Muntenia, Prince Barbu Știrbei requested an engineer specializing in mining operations during a meeting with Emperor Franz Joseph in 1852. The same year, engineer Carol Karacsony, the head of the Ocna Dej mine, was appointed to the task.

After geological studies and surveys, Karacsony proposed using the trapezoidal chamber profile method first used in the Wieliczka Salt Mine in Poland. This new mine was opened on the western slope of Slănic under the name Sistematica. In 1867 another mine under the name Carol I was opened. In 1912 the Mihai mine was established, connecting through a gallery to the Carol I mine. Both mines functioned until 1943, when Unirea began operations beneath the other two mines.

=== Unirea mine ===
Unirea Salt Mine - map

The work for the opening of the Unirea salt mine started in 1938, and salt was extracted from this mine between 1943 and 1970.

The salt was removed in successive layers of 2.2 metres (7 ft 3 in), from the ceiling downward, with a horizontal cutting at the basis and vertically along the walls. The de-rocking was made through shooting. The transportation of the resulting material was effected with the tubs up the shaft using a cage to the installation of preparation and expedition.

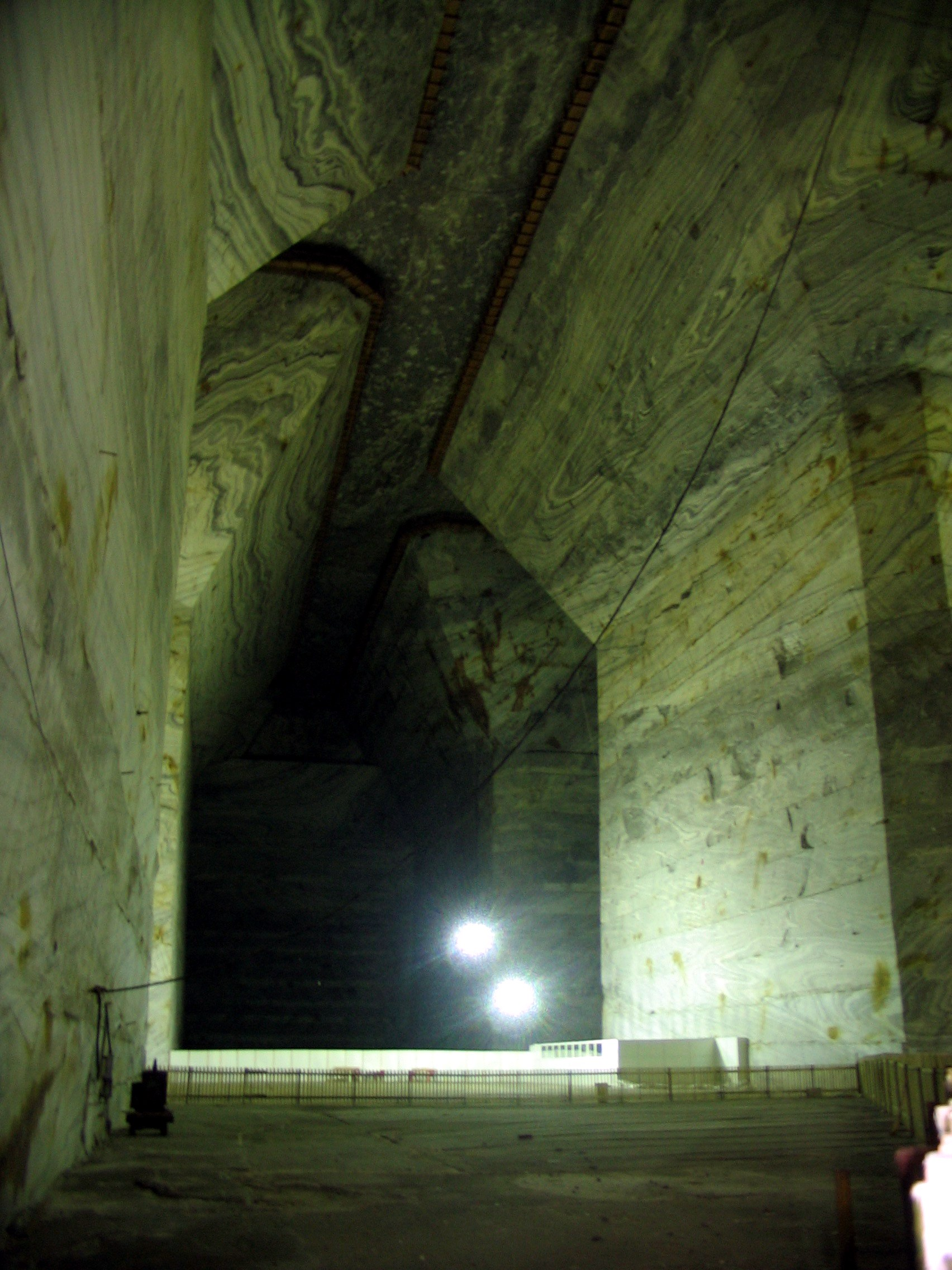
The Unirea mine chamber - notice the trapezoidal profile of the chamber and the wooden balcony at the top

The mine is composed of 14 chambers with trapezoidal profiles, having a 10 m (33 ft) opening to the ceiling and 32 m (105 ft) to the ground, a height of 54 m (177 ft) and a wall inclination angle of 60 degrees. The shore difference between the surface and the base of the mine is of 208 m (682 ft) and it is covered by the elevator in 90 seconds, though the elevator has been out of order since 2014. The excavated space occupies a volume of 2.9 million m³ and it is extended on a surface of 78,000 m².

Since 1970, the mine has been a tourist attraction, offering exceptional natural conditions as a result of its microclimate, rich in aerosols, which some believe effective in treating respiratory disease. The air-conditioning of the mine is natural, with a constant temperature during the whole year of 12 °C, an atmospheric pressure of 730 mmHg and a humidity with an average of 10% lower than the surface average.

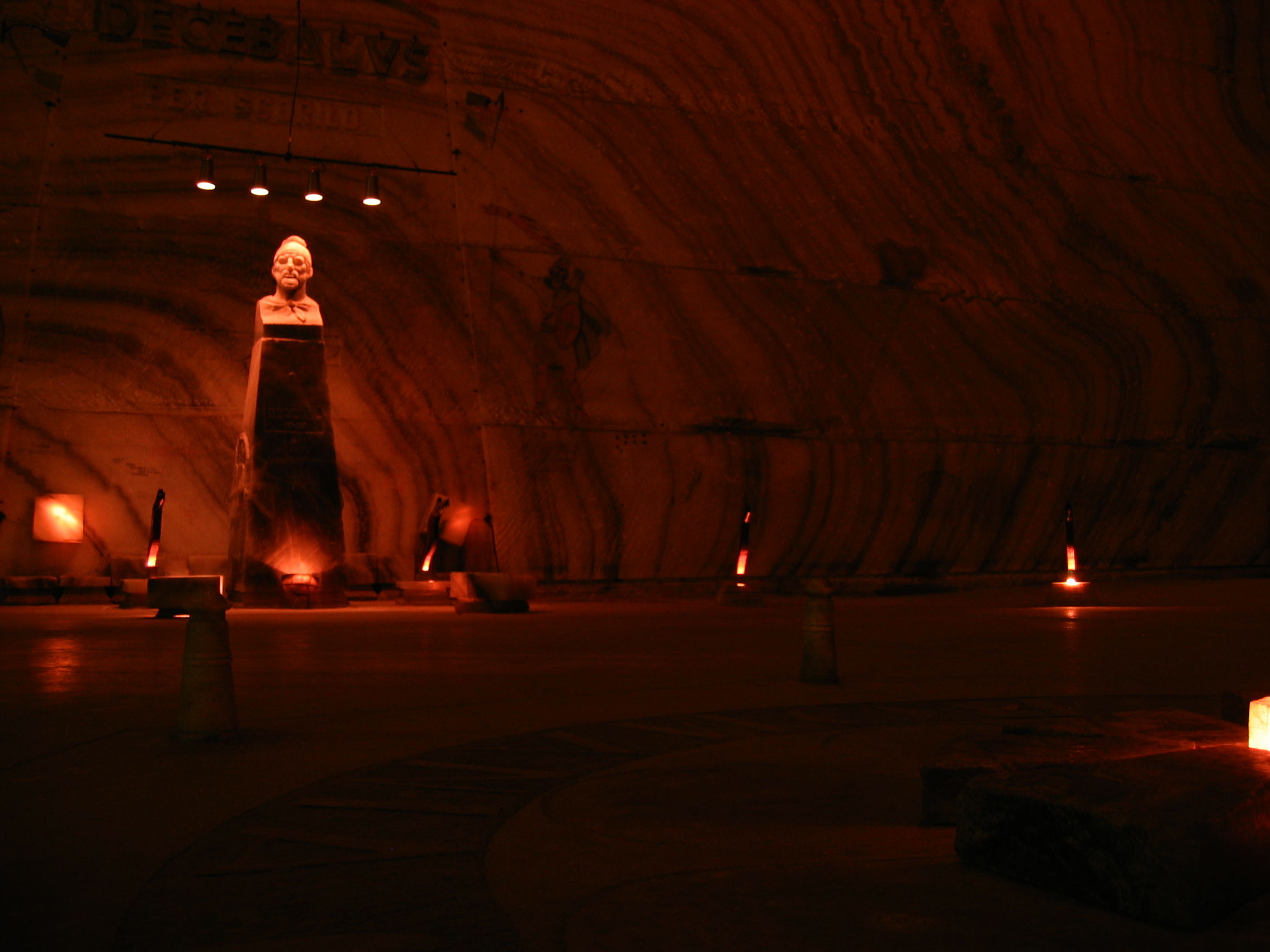
Statue of Decebal, in the Genesis Hall

One of the chambers is a salt museum named Genesis Hall by its author Iustin Năstase and it hosts the busts in salt of Decebal and Traian. There are also other salt sculptures in the mine, such as the bust of Mihai Eminescu or a bas-relief with Mihai Viteazul, works of the local artist, Oana Brezeanu.

Some of the mine chambers were transformed in sport courts where athletes perform their trainings.

The ceiling of the mine is bordered by wooden balconies on the whole perimeter. The balconies are used for the circulation of the authorized personnel during the periodic inspection of the stability of the surfaces from the superior zone of the mine construction. The zones with uncertain stability are delimited at the base of the mine, being closed for the public access.

=== Mihai mine ===
Located vertically above the Unirea mine and separated from it by a 40 m (130 ft) thick floor, the Mihai level was opened in 1912 and consists of six trapezoidal shaped rooms with a 12 m (39 ft) ceiling width, 37 m (121 ft) floor width, 66 m (217 ft) height and a wall inclination angle of 60 degrees.

Mining was carried out on a descending track. Until 1942, when the Unirea mine was opened, 462 m3 of rock salt had been excavated. This was the first salt mine in Romania provided with electric lighting.

After 1970, the Mihai mine has been the host of several national and international aeromodeling contests, occasions on which free access of tourists in the mine is also allowed.

== Salt dissolution ==
During the fall of 1994, both levels were severely damaged by the natural phenomenon of salt dissolution due to infiltration of ground and pluvial waters, which flooded the Unirea mine. The catastrophic aggressiveness of waters flowing down the shaft gradually created huge cavities and the specialists who evaluated the full scope of the disaster decided to close down the mine. Eugen Scrob, an I.S.P.H. researcher, came up with an idea which was to keep the mine from completely collapsing. He immediately applied a new experimental method, helped by the miners of the Slanic mine. After four years of work, the stream bed was eventually regulated. Constant drillings monitored the dynamics of landslide and the piezometric level. Also, huge amounts of concrete were used to line the shaft and fill the existing cavities. All costs of these works, amounting to a total of over 20 billion Romanian lei (ROL; equivalent to 2 million RON), were exclusively borne by the Slănic salt mine. After the water was evacuated and the hearth of the flooded mine was completely drained, the site was reopened on 31 July 1998.

== Gallery ==
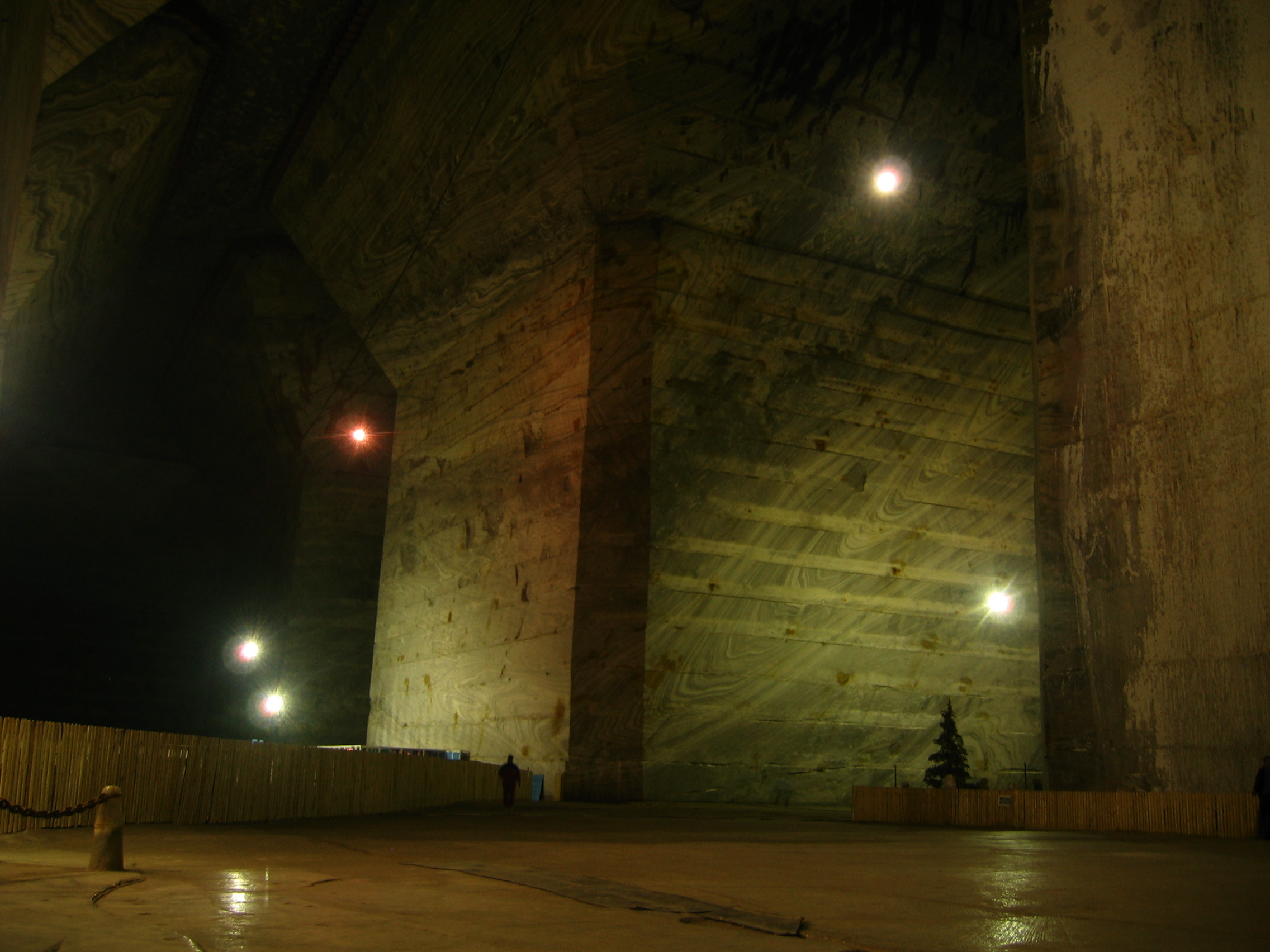
General view

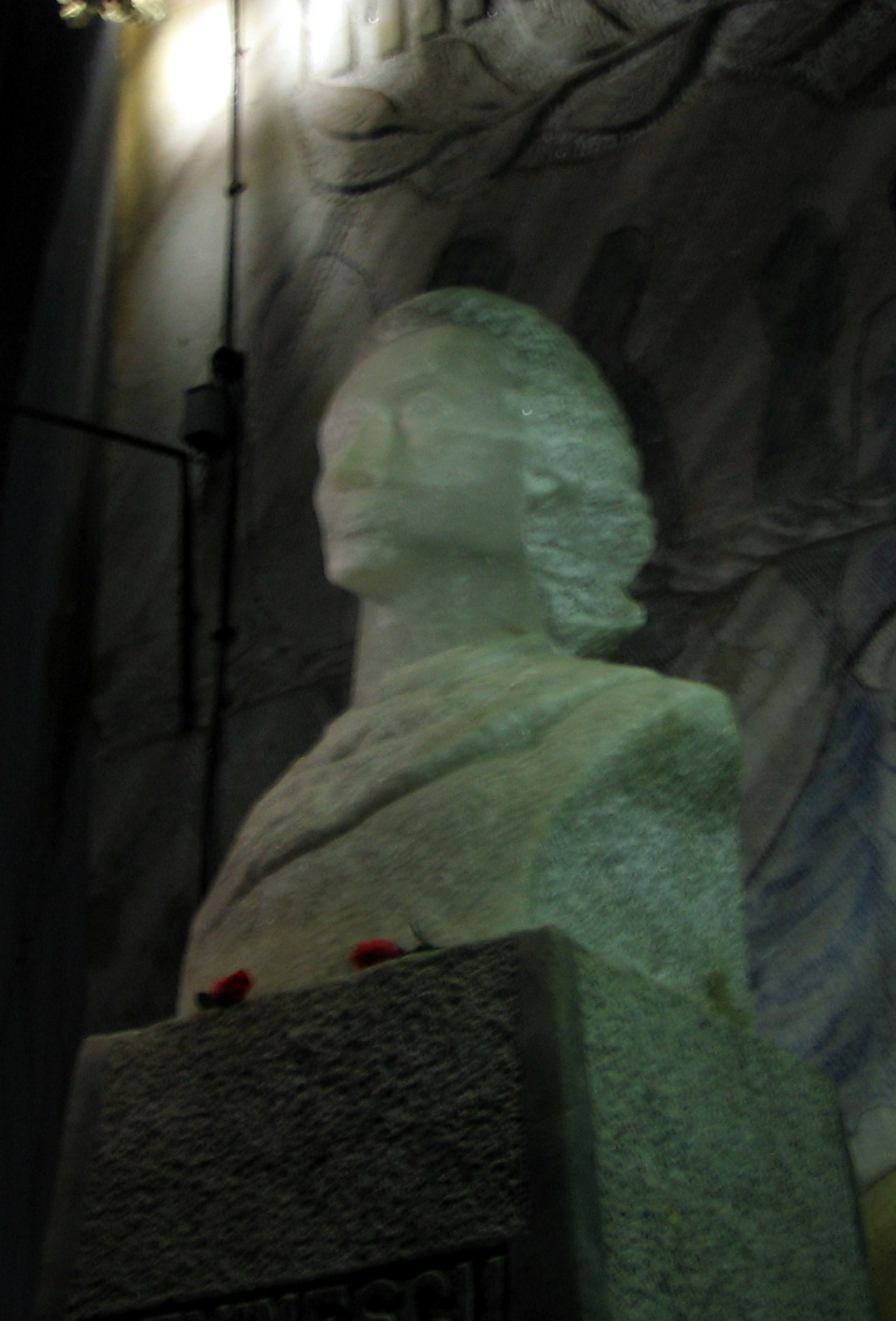
Eminescu's statue

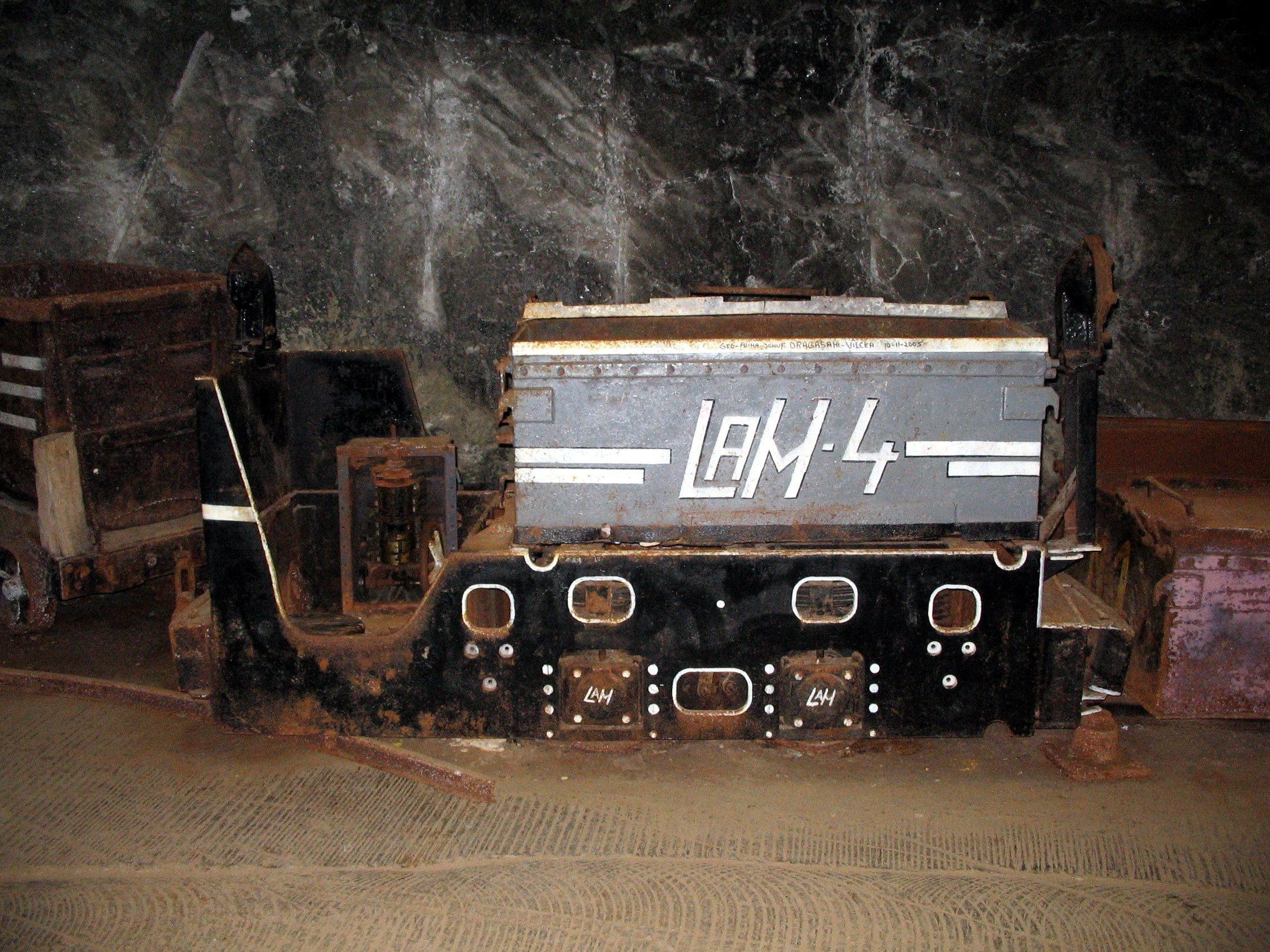
A mining cart

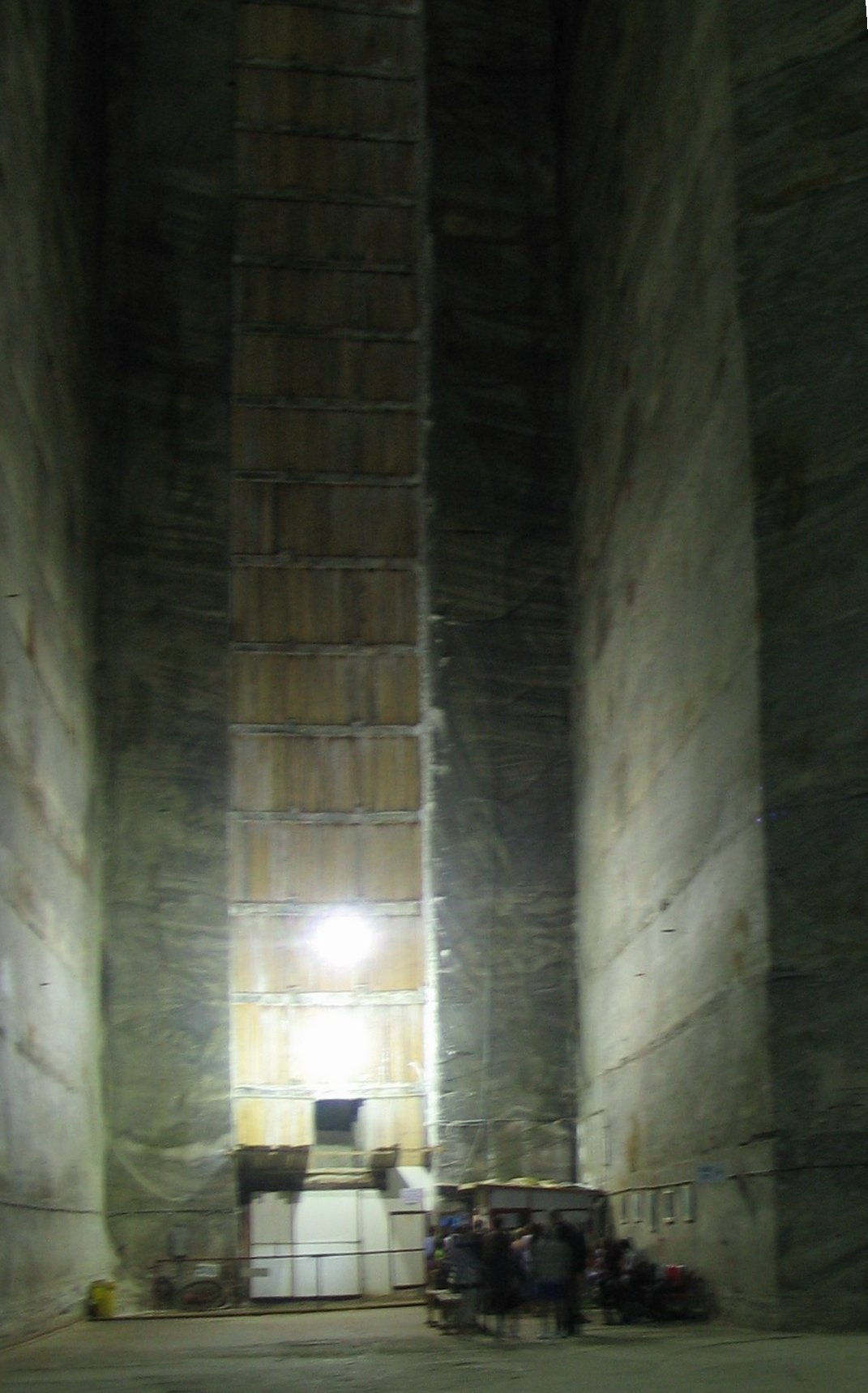
The elevator shaft

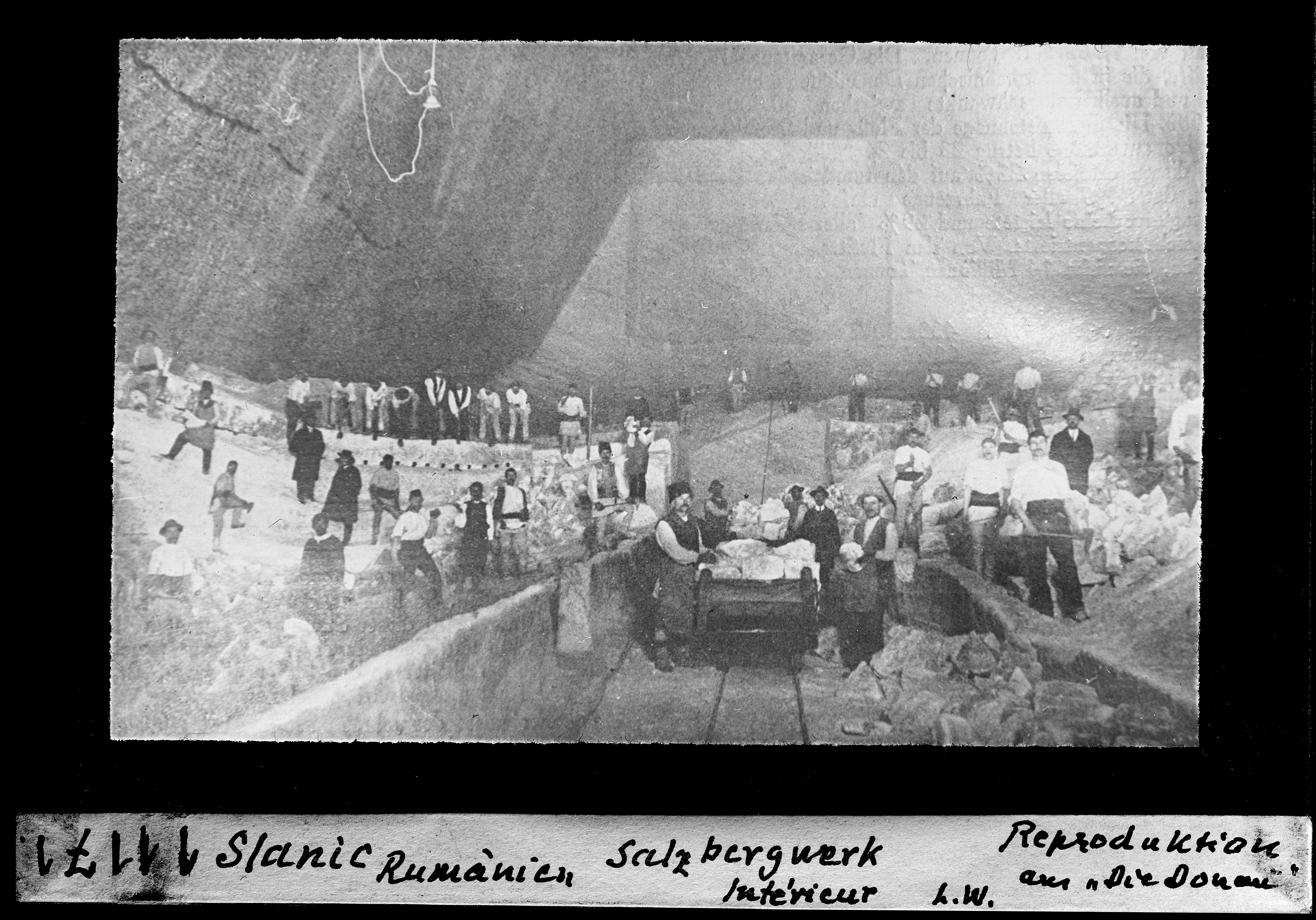
Interior of the mine in 1938
