= Paratethys =

Prehistoric shallow inland sea in Eurasia

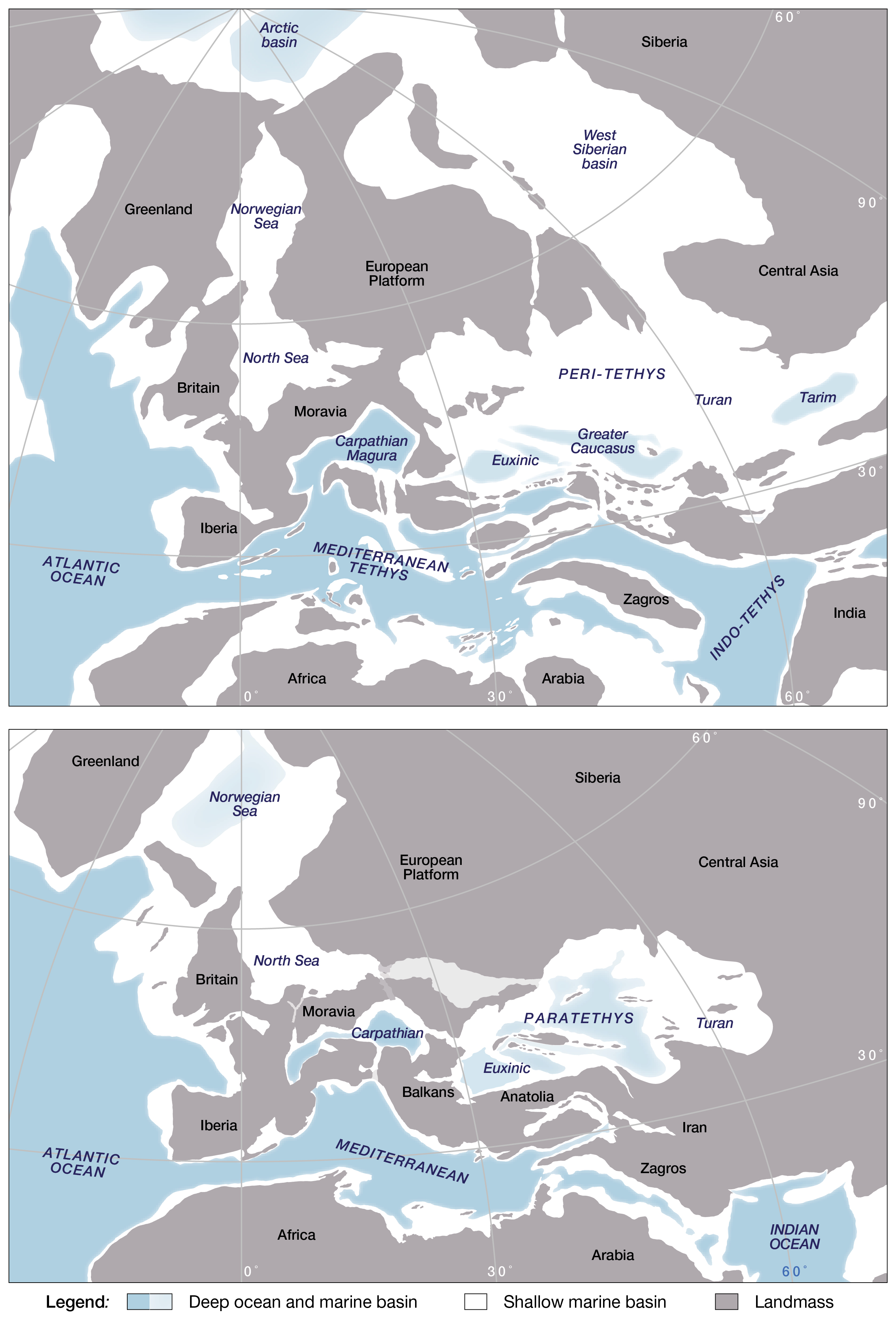
Palaeogeographical reorganization of the Tethys–Paratethys region during the Paleogene, from a connected Tethys configuration during the early Eocene (above) to a fragmented and restricted Paratethys region configuration during the Oligocene (below). Note the loss of deep-water connections between the Indian Ocean region and the Mediterranean, the complete loss of Indian–Arctic Ocean connections, and the closure of most of the Eocene seaways in the Oligocene time.

The Paratethys Sea, Paratethys Ocean, Paratethys realm or just Paratethys (meaning "beside Tethys"), was a large shallow inland sea that covered much of mainland Europe and parts of western Asia during the middle to late Cenozoic, from the late Paleogene to the late Neogene, and is regarded as the largest inland sea in history. At its greatest extent, it stretched from the region north of the Alps over Central Europe to the Aral Sea in Central Asia.

Paratethys formed about 34 Mya (million years ago) at the beginning of the Oligocene epoch, when the northern region of the Tethys Ocean (Peri-Tethys) was separated from the Mediterranean region of the Tethys realm due to the formation of the Alps, Carpathians, Dinarides, Taurus and Elburz mountains. Paratethys was at times reconnected with the Tethys or its successors (the Mediterranean Sea or the Indian Ocean) during the Oligocene and the early and middle Miocene times, but at the onset of the late Miocene epoch, the tectonically trapped sea turned into a megalake from the eastern Alps to what is now Kazakhstan. From the Pliocene epoch onward (after 5 million years ago), Paratethys became progressively shallower. Today's Black Sea, Caspian Sea, and Aral Sea are remnants of the Paratethys Sea.

== Name and research ==
The name Paratethys was first used by Vladimir Laskarev in 1924. Laskarev's definition included only fossils and sedimentary strata from the sea of the Neogene system. This definition was later adjusted also to include the Oligocene series. The existence of a separate water body in these periods was deduced from the fossil fauna, including mollusks, fish and ostracods. In periods in which the Paratethys or parts of it were separated from each other or from other oceans, a separate fauna developed which is found in sedimentary deposits. In this way, the paleogeographical development of the Paratethys can be studied. Laskerev's description of the Paratethys was anticipated much earlier by Sir Roderick Murchison in chapter 13 of his 1845 book.

One of the key characteristics of the Paratethys realm, that is differentiating it from the Tethys Ocean, is the widespread development of endemic fauna, adapted to fresh and brackish waters like those that still exist in recent waters of the Caspian Sea. This distinctive fauna in which univalves of freshwater origin such as Limnex and Neritinex are associated with forms of Cardiacae and Mytili, common to partially saline or brackish waters, makes the geologic records from Paratethys particularly difficult to correlate with those from other oceans or seas because their faunas evolved separately at times. Stratigraphers of the Paratethys, therefore, have their own sets of stratigraphic stages which are still used as alternatives for the official geologic timescale of the ICS.

== Palaeogeographic evolution ==
Paratethys was peculiar due to its paleogeography: it consisted of a series of deep basins, formed during the Oxfordian stage of the Late Jurassic as an extension of the rift that formed the Central Atlantic Ocean. During the Jurassic and Cretaceous periods, this part of Eurasia was covered by shallow seas that formed the northern margins of the Tethys Ocean. These basins were connected with each other and the global ocean by narrow and shallow seaways that often limited water exchange and caused widespread long-term anoxia. The Paratethys descends directly from the Peri-Tethys, the northwestern arm of the Tethys Ocean, which was separated from the rest of the ocean via the Alpide orogeny.

The Paratethys spread over a large area in Central Europe and western Asia. In the west it included in some stages the Molasse basin north of the Alps; the Vienna Basin, the Outer Carpathian Basin, the Pannonian Basin, and further east to the basin of the current Black Sea and the Caspian Sea until the current position of the Aral Sea.

=== Anoxic Giant ===
The boundary between the Eocene and Oligocene epochs was characterized by a big drop of the global (eustatic) sea level and sudden steep cooling of global climates. At the same time the Alpine orogeny, a tectonic phase by which the Alps, Carpathians, Dinarides, Taurus, Elburz and many other mountain chains along the southern rim of Eurasia were formed. The combination of a drop in sea level and tectonic uplift resulted in the partial disconnection of the Tethys and Paratethys domains. Due to poor connectivity with the global ocean, the Paratethys realm became stratified and turned into a giant anoxic sea.

The western and central Paratethys basins experienced intense tectonic activity and anoxia during the Oligocene and early Miocene and became filled with sediments. Local gypsum and salt evaporitic basins formed in the East Carpathian region during the early Miocene. The Eastern Paratethys basin, holding most of the water of Paratethys, remained anoxic for almost 20 million years (35–15 Mya), and during this time Paratethys acted as an enormous carbon sink trapping organic matter in its sediments. The Paratethys anoxia was "shut down" during the middle Miocene, some 15 million years ago, when a widespread marine transgression, known as the Badenian Flooding, improved connections with the global ocean and triggered the ventilation of the deep waters of Paratethys.

=== Short-lived open seas ===
After the Badenian Flooding, in the middle Miocene, Paratethys was characterized by open-marine environments. Brackish and lacustrine basins turned into ventilated seas. Rich marine fauna containing sharks (e.g., megalodon), corals, marine mammals, foraminifera and nanoplankton spread throughout Paratethys from the neighbouring Mediterranean region, probably via the Trans-Tethyan Corridor, an ancient sea-strait located in modern Slovenia.

=== Salt Giants ===
The open marine environments of Paratethys were short-lived, and halfway through the middle Miocene, progressive uplift of the central European mountain ranges and a eustatic drop isolated Paratethys from the global ocean triggering a salinity crisis in Central Paratethys. The "Badenian Salinity Crisis" spanned between 13.8 and 13.4 Mya. Thick evaporitic beds (salt and gypsum) formed in the Outer Carpathians, Transylvanian and Pannonian basins. Salt mines extract this middle-Miocene salt in Transylvania: Turda, Ocna Mures, Ocna Sibiului and Praid; in the Eastern and Carpathians: Wieliczka, Bochnia, Cacica and Slanic Prahova; and Ocnele Mari in the Southern Carpathians, but evaporites are also present in areas west of the Carpathians: Maramureș, eastern Slovakia (Solivar mine near Prešov) and, to a lesser extent, in the Pannonian depression in central Hungary.

=== Megalake ===
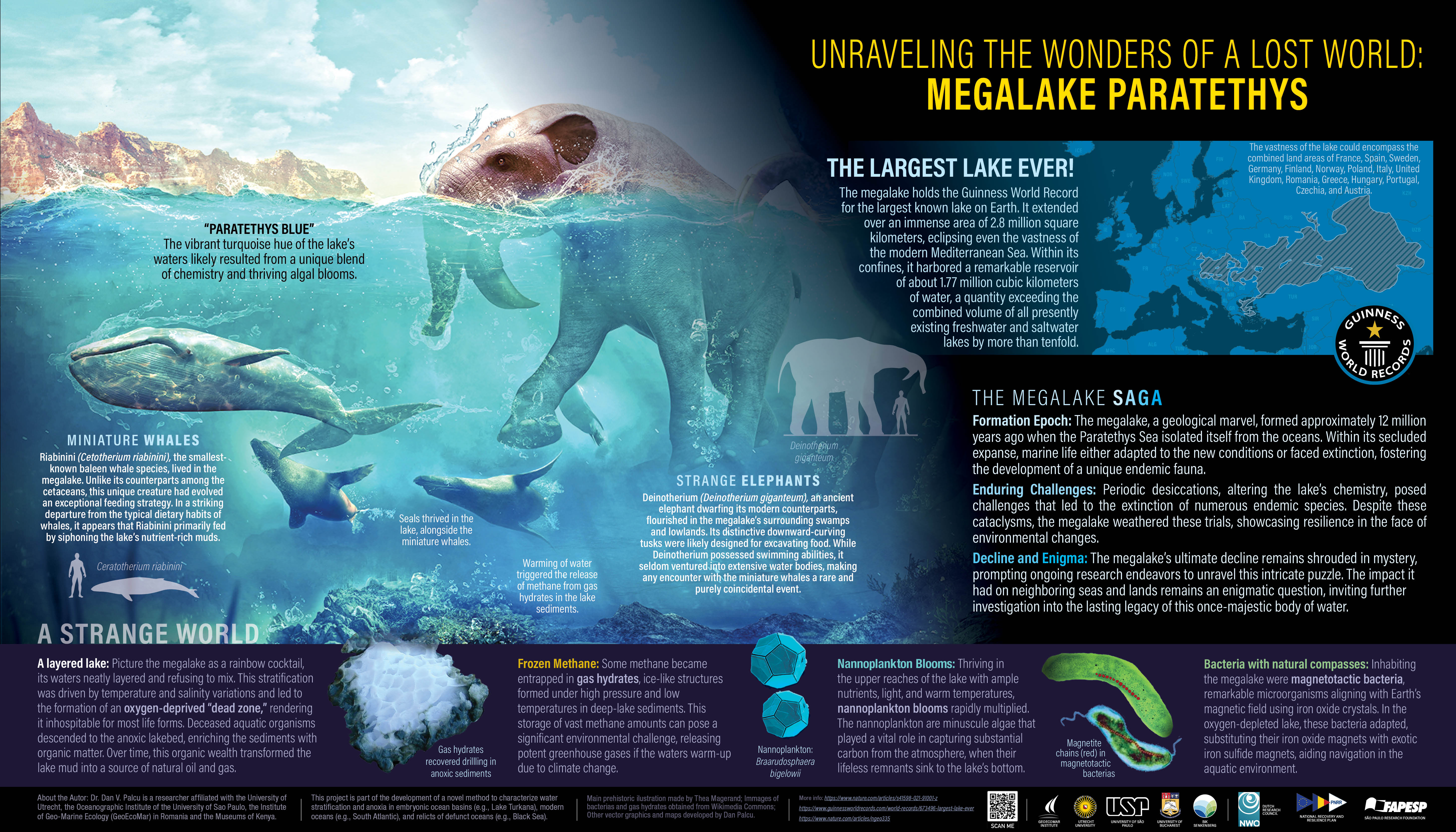
Megafaunal diversity of the Paratethys megalake included cetaceans and pinnipeds most notably the Cetotherium riabinini went thorough a presumed insular dwarfism.

Some 12 million years ago, slightly before the onset of the late Miocene, the ancient sea transformed into a megalake that covered more than 2.8 million square kilometers, from the eastern Alps to what is now Kazakhstan, and characterized by salinities generally ranging between 12 and 14‰. During its five-million-year lifetime, the megalake was home to many species found nowhere else, including molluscs and ostracods as well as miniature versions of whales, dolphins and seals. In 2023, Guinness World Records named this lake the largest in earth's history. Near the end of the Miocene, an event known as the Khersonian crisis, marked by rapidly fluctuating environmental factors and sea levels, wiped out much of the unique fish fauna of this megalake.

=== After Paratethys ===
When parts of the Mediterranean fell dry during the Messinian salinity crisis (about 6 million years ago) there were phases when Paratethys water flowed into the deep Mediterranean basins. During the Pliocene epoch (5.33 to 2.58 million years ago) the former Paratethys was divided into a couple of inland seas that were at times completely separated from each other. An example was the Pannonian Sea, a brackish sea in the Pannonian Basin. Many of these would disappear before the start of the Pleistocene. At present, only the Black Sea, Caspian Sea and the Aral Sea remain of what was once a vast inland sea.

== Paleoecology ==
During the Middle Miocene Climatic Optimum, the Paratethys supported a tropical to subtropical marine ecosystem with very high biodiversity and endemism, including the establishment of coral reef ecosystems. Some portions of the Paratethys, over modern Poland, were deep enough to support a bathypelagic ecosystem with significant endemism. An exceptionally-preserved record of this ecosystem is known from the Oligocene-aged Menilite Formation, a flysch containing fossils of pelagic and deep-sea fish taxa, as well as microbial mats. This biodiversity was badly hit by environmental changes later in the Miocene, with the coral reefs being wiped out following cooling during the Middle Miocene disruption, while changing circulation patterns and the resulting anoxia wiped out the deepwater habitats. Surface-dwelling species saw a significant decline from a collapse in the zooplankton populations. Despite its diversity, the brief "Paratethyan biodiversity hotspot" was short-lived, lasting for only 3 million years.

=== Fishes ===
The isolation of the Paratethys from other ocean basins saw the adaptive radiation and diversification of numerous endemic fish lineages. These endemic fish were closely related to modern groups, but belonged to their own distinct, now-lost evolutionary radiations. For example, gobies were a particularly successful group in the Paratethys, with numerous endemic genera and species known from both fossil skeletons and otoliths. The modern diversity of Ponto-Caspian gobies (Benthophilinae) likely originates from survivors of this radiation. Many different families of clupeoids (herrings, shad and allies) also saw extensive diversification in the Paratethys, with many fossil genera known.

Connections with the Mediterranean Sea allowed for many cartilaginous fish (sharks and rays) to colonize the Paratethys Sea by the Early Miocene. A Miocene-aged deepwater shark fauna from Slovakia is depauperate and mostly dominated by squaliforms, and appears to suggest a highly stressed paleoenvironment. Later fossil assemblages suggest that the increased isolation of the Paratethys by the Middle Miocene caused significant extirpation among most small-to-medium sized deepwater and pelagic sharks. However, larger sharks, such as the megalodon and Carcharodon hastalis, continued to persist in the Paratethys and did not see such extirpations, likely due to the widespread occurrence of marine mammals to feed on.

The evolutionary legacy of the Paratethys Sea continues to influence modern aquatic ecosystems. It is hypothesized that the successful contemporary expansion of Ponto-Caspian fish species into the Volga River basin is historically predetermined by a complex of physiological and biochemical adaptations (preadaptations) that these taxa developed during the unstable hydrological and salinity regimes of the Paratethys period, allowing them to rapidly colonize newly formed, lake-type reservoirs.

=== Marine mammals ===
The Paratethys also supported numerous marine mammal lineages, including cetaceans and pinnipeds. It included several genera of dwarf baleen whales within the family Cetotheriidae, including Cetotherium rathkii and Ciuciulea davidi. These are among the smallest baleen whales ever known to have existed, and it has been suggested that the group may have originated in the Paratethys. The eurhinodelphinids, an unusual family of toothed whales, appear to have invaded the Paratethys via the Mediterranean during the middle Miocene, with remains of the widespread genus Xiphiacetus recovered from Austria. The more primitive toothed whale Romaleodelphis also appears to have been a Paratethyan endemic. Over time, in response to the increased salinity in the Paratethys from its isolation, marine mammals independently evolved pachyosteosclerosis, leading to dense, bulky bones. This condition appears to have independently evolved in pinnipeds, toothed whales and baleen whales, and first started appearing the Central Paratethys after the Badenian Salinity Crisis before spreading eastwards.

== See also ==
- Caspian Depression – Low-lying flatland region encompassing the northern part of the Caspian Sea
- Piemont-Liguria Ocean – Former piece of oceanic crust that is seen as part of the Tethys Ocean
- Zanclean flood – Theoretical refilling of the Mediterranean Sea between the Miocene and Pliocene Epochs
- Paleo-Tethys Ocean – Ocean on the margin of Gondwana between the Middle Cambrian and Late Triassic
