= Cacica mine =

Salt mine in northern Romania

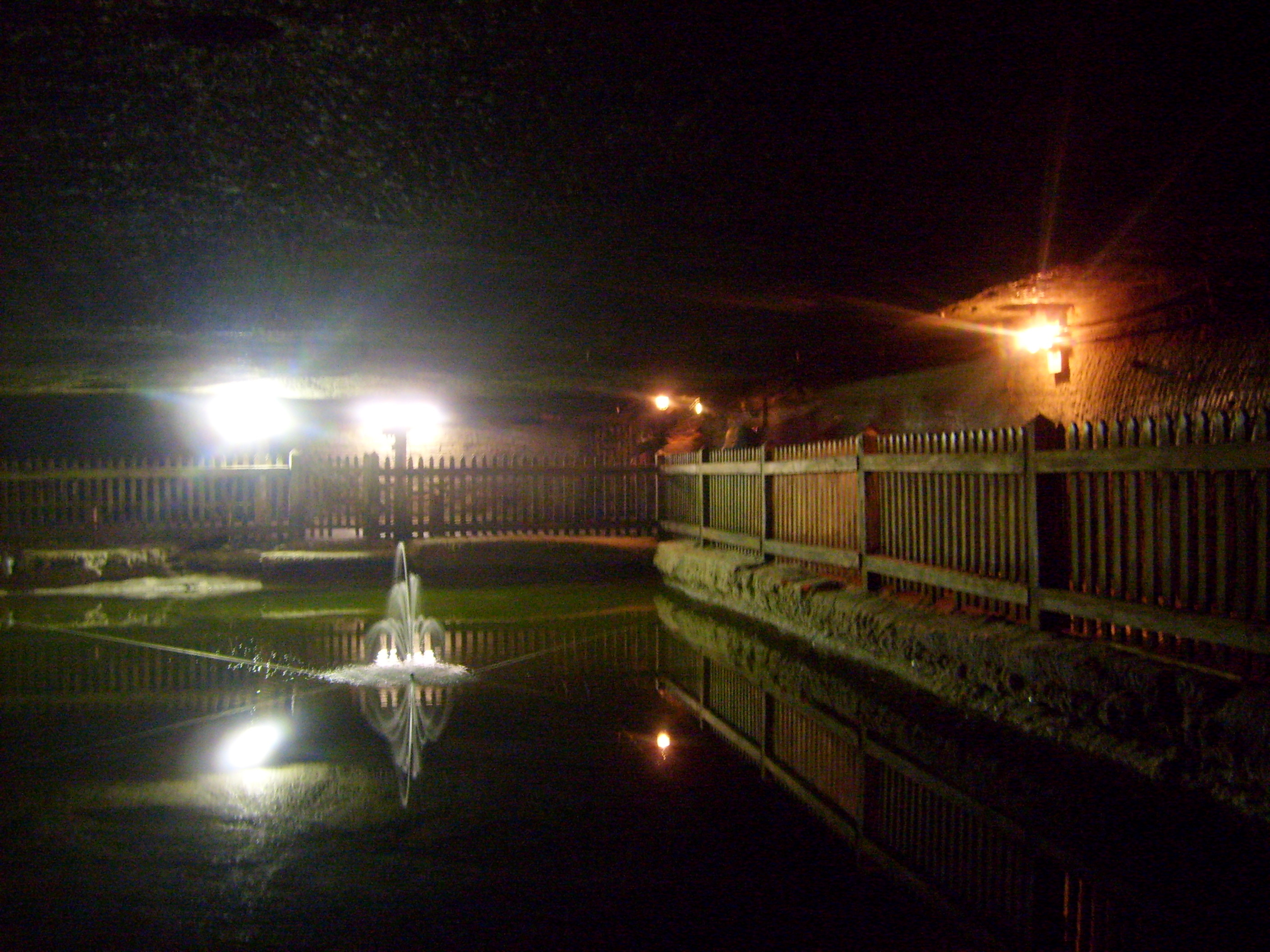

- Location within Romania

Location
- Location: Cacica, Suceava County, Romania; 47°38′6.36″N 25°53′52.8″E

Production
- Products: Sodium chloride

Owner
- Company: Salrom

The Cacica mine is a large salt mine located in northern Romania in Suceava County, close to Cacica. Cacica represents one of the largest salt reserves in Romania having estimated reserves of 238 million tonnes of NaCl.
