= Gheorghe Eminescu =

Romanian historian, memoirist and Land Forces officer (1890 - 1988)

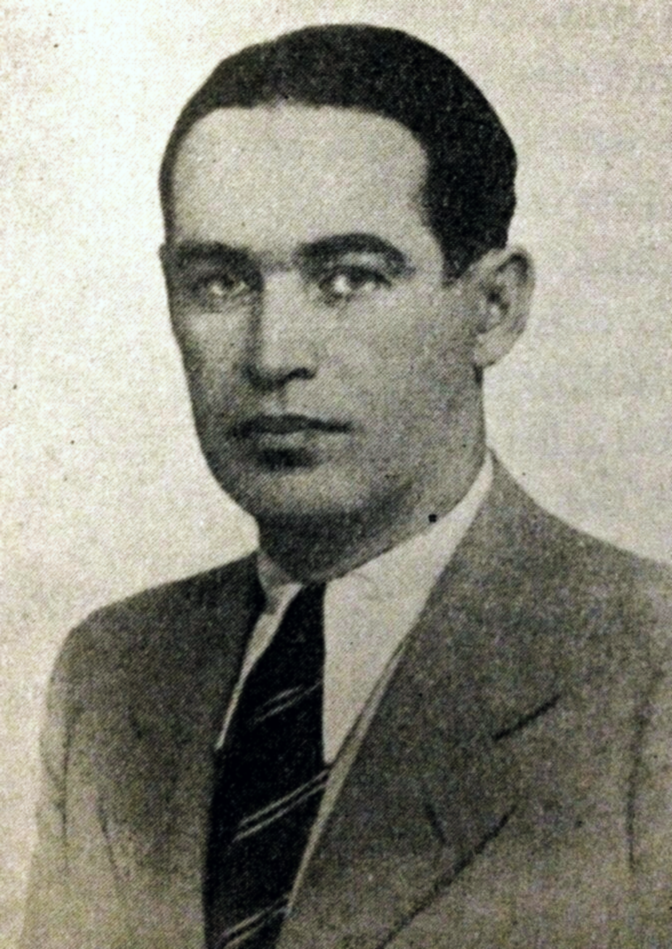
- Photograph of Eminescu, c. 1930
- Born: 31 May 1890; Mizil, Kingdom of Romania
- Died: 6 June 1988 (aged 98); Iancului, Bucharest, Communist Romania
- Spouse: Elena Labunțev
- Children: 1
- Relatives: Mihai Eminescu (paternal uncle); Aurel Persu (in-law)
- Military career
- Allegiance: Romania
- Branch: Romanian Land Forces
- Service years: c. 1915–1944
- Rank: Lieutenant Colonel
- Commands: 2nd Machine Gunners Company in the 35th Infantry Regiment
- Conflicts: World War I; Romanian campaign; Battle of the Argeș; Battle of Mărășești; Russian Civil War; Bessarabia campaign; Khotyn Uprising; Tatarbunary Uprising
- Awards: Virtutea Ostășească, First Class
- Other work: Historian, memoirist, poet, factory owner

Gheorghe Matei Eminescu (31 May 1890 – 6 June 1988) was a Romanian historian, memoirist and Land Forces officer. The posthumous nephew of national poet Mihai Eminescu, he was born to Captain Matei Eminescu; on his mother's side, he was also the nephew of Mizil politician Leonida Condeescu. As an adolescent, he joined his half-brother Victor on the bohemian scene, and was an observer of the Symbolist movement. Eminescu failed as a student, and was barred from all the country's civilian high schools. His Condeescu relatives were largely responsible for his having to choose a career in the military, which he had initially resented. He fought in the Romanian campaigns of World War I, commanding a machine gunners' unit during the defense of Mărășești. After spending some time in German captivity, he participated in the 1918 Romanian expedition to Bessarabia.

Eminescu remained there for some 15 years, commanding units on Romania's border with the Soviet Union and eventually rising to the position of Lieutenant Colonel. After passing into the reserves, he owned a factory in Brăila, and was briefly aligned with the National Peasants' Party. He was sidelined and imprisoned following the establishment of Communist Romania, though his daughter, Yolanda, was able to integrate within the academic elite. Upon his release, Eminescu dedicated himself fully to historical and literary research, being commanded especially as a Romania expert on Napoleon Bonaparte—though he also completed a work on his famous uncle and his family, as a subject on which he would lecture on into his final years. Under the selectively liberal climate of national communism, Eminescu was allowed to publish in magazines such as România Literară and Magazin Istoric. Unlike his uncle and his half-brother Victor-Ion, he generally avoided writing poetry, only publishing one such piece when he was already in his nineties.

Eminescu's more secretive activity included recollections of his wartime and interwar activities, which were preserved in samizdat by several friends, including communist official Ion Popescu-Puțuri. The author died at age 98 at his home in Bucharest. He was survived by daughter Yolanda, a noted female judge and academic in Romania, and by his granddaughter Roxana, who joined the teaching staff at the University of Western Brittany; his direct descendants mostly live in France. His anti-communist memoirs appeared, albeit in still-fragmentary form, after the Romanian Revolution of 1989.

== Biography ==
=== Origins ===
Gheorghe Eminescu belonged to the boyar aristocracy of Moldavia through both his paternal grandparents. His grandmother Raluca Iurașcu was from an "immemorial boyar house", and reportedly viewed herself as of higher birth than her husband, Gheorghe Eminovici. On that side, the Colonel had a "Moskal" or "Cossack" great-grandfather, Vasile Donțu—according to Iurașcu family tradition, his real name was "Alexa Potloff". Gheorghe's namesake and paternal grandfather, who owned land in Ipotești, had a more disputed origin—he saw himself as having origins in the Swedish Empire, with an officer who had escaped to Moldavia after the Battle of Poltava (1709). Literary historians from N. Petrașcu to Arșavir Acterian have more often argued that the name "Eminovici" suggests a Turkish or Armenian ancestor. Scholar Dimitrie Vatamaniuc questions their approach, and proposes that the family, originally Iminovits or Iminovici, originated in the Principality of Transylvania, but had fled to the more permissive Bukovina District in protest against communion with Rome. Also rejecting claims that Eminovici was a foreign name, the Lieutenant Colonel's father Matei Eminescu noted his descent from Moldavian peasants, raised into the boyardom by Prince Grigore Sturdza in 1841. According to his notes, the conferring of nobility upon the Eminovicis was whimsical, and probably facilitated through acts of corruption. He also reports that Mihai Eminescu himself "was rather uncertain that our father was full-blooded Romanian", though declaring himself "as Romanian as they ever get in Ipotești" through his mother's roots.

The family was proudly right-wing, and committed to voting for the Conservative Party after the latter was established in 1880. Captain Matei or Mateiu Eminescu (1856–1929) was both the youngest and the longest lived of the eight Eminescu siblings who survived past childhood. Unlike his elder brothers, he did not pursue his education in Austria-Hungary. Also unlike them, he dedicated himself to a career in the Romanian Army, serving with distinction in the Romanian War of Independence before resigning in June 1892. He was for long uninterested in literary pursuits of any kind, preferring to read on topics such as horticulture and home economics. However, in the 1890s he became engaged in a protracted legal battle with editor Titu Maiorescu and the Șaraga brothers over the copyrights to Mihai Eminescu's poetic works, and curated his own selection from them.

Eminovici family arms, as reported by heraldist Traian Larionescul

Captain Matei had by then married and divorced twice. His first wife was Matilda Ilian or Emilian, a history teacher in Brăila; their son Victor-Ion, whom Matei repudiated, became a journalist, after first training as a lawyer. Moving to Mizil, the Captain remarried in 1890 Ana Condeescu. Though a homemaker who satisfied her husband's requirements for cleanliness and good child-rearing, she had followed her brother's advice and attempted to enlist at the Iași Medical School in 1888. According to scholar Augustin Z. N. Pop, she was the granddaughter or niece of politician Leonida Condeescu—who, Pop notes, had a literary fame of his own, as the inspiration for Ion Luca Caragiale's play, Conu Leonida față cu reacțiunea. This is corrected by Gheorghe's own account, according to whom Leonida was in fact Ana's brother. Gheorghe's actual grandfather, on this side, was Costache Condu. Originally of Vadu Săpat, he had started a soap manufacturing business and the Mizil gristmill, while himself turning to Conservative politics. Costache's son Leonida followed in his footsteps and, seen by Caragiale as the "most devoted and loyal" Conservative, took 90% of the vote during the mayoral election of 1895.

The Eminescus were divorced in November 1892, due to Matei's "violence and austerity"; four children had been born to them: Lelia-Sapho, Ecaterina, Hanibal, and Gheorghe. Literary historians record Gheorghe Eminescu's birth as occurring on 1 June 1890, while the birth certificate, though completed on that day, reports the preceding evening of 31 May. The document also gives his birthplace as Mizil, in the home of his maternal grandfather Costache. This was almost a year after Mihai Eminescu's death, with Gheorghe being sometimes credited as his only nephew. He was baptized Romanian Orthodox at the Cathedral of Ploiești. His first name was chosen in memory of his Eminovici grandfather. His sister Lelia-Sapho died as a toddler in July 1896.

=== Educational failure ===
Matei and Ana reunited in 1896, but divorced again in July 1898. While his father took petty jobs as a Subprefect, then withdrew to collect his pension in Turnu Severin, Gheorghe spent his early years in his grandfather's home at Mizil. Shortly after winning the election, Mayor Condeescu took Gheorghe and his siblings to meet Caragiale in Vadu Săpat, where they gathered for a party. He recalled being unimpressed at the time, since he only knew of Caragiale as a tenant and restaurateur. His father the Captain always held a grudge against Caragiale, recounting an incident in which the latter had stolen some political documents from Mihai. In his later years, Gheorghe Eminescu vouched for his father's account, against literary historian Șerban Cioculescu, who suspected it was a fabrication.

Eminescu studied first at the Ion Crăciunescu School in Mizil, where, as he reports, he only had top grades because he was Condu's grandson. Matei ultimately remarried a third and final time, to the Transylvanian Silvia Maieru, occasionally receiving his children in their new home. Gheorghe recalls spending summers with Hanibal in Glogova, where Matei was tending to the estate of an absentee landlord, Gună Vernescu. The manor they inhabited had once been home to the Oltenian folk hero, Tudor Vladimirescu. He and Matei bonded over they shared loved for hunting rifles, with father affectionately mocking his son as Săpunarul ("The Soapmaker", evoking Condu's original business).

By 1905, Gheorghe's half-brother Victor had joined the ranks of the Symbolist movement. As noted by eyewitness Eugeniu Sperantia, he was a talented but indolent poet; the positive side of this verdict is contradicted by Gheorghe himself, who notes of Victor: "he thought that, since he had inherited the name, he had also inherited Mihai's genius [...], but soon realized that the name carried too much weight to be associated with such minor poetry." In 1911, both brothers were in Galați for the unveiling of their uncle's bust, done by Frederic Storck. Meanwhile, Gheorghe had begun studying at the Lautey–Cliniciu–Popa Liseanu boarding school in Bucharest; it was here that he met shepherd Badea Cârțan, who was smuggling Romanian books into Austria-Hungary, and who was allowed to sleep on school premises.

Eminescu recounts that he was always mediocre as a high school student. Despite being in a class overseen by literary scholar Gheorghe Bogdan-Duică and childhood friends with poet Agatha Bacovia, he never even wrote a work in verse. Yolanda Eminescu notes that her father had a passion, and real talent, for the legal profession. Bogdan-Duică was amazed at his poor grades, noting: "too bad for that name you carry." After nearly flunking, he was beaten up by his grandfather, and then dispatched to Hasdeu College, in Buzău. A "dreamer and delayed romantic", he only managed to avoid being sent to summer school during his fourth year. During that part of his life, he read Arthur Schopenhauer, declaring himself a philosophical pessimist as well as an atheist; one of Eminescu's colleagues snitched on him to their catechist, and he only narrowly escaped being beating in front of his class.

Hanibal Eminescu died at age sixteen (in October 1911), having been diagnosed with Graves' disease. That event interfered with Gheorghe's education, causing him to be privately tutored at a boarding school "for dreamers such as myself"—in Bucharest's Armenian Quarter. This allowed him to spend much time by Victor's side, with whom he attended literary gatherings at Terasa Oteteleșanu—the juniors of a group which also included Alexandru Cazaban, George Gregoirian, and I. Dragoslav. He also caught glimpse of literary doyens such as Alexandru Macedonski and George Coșbuc, and was also present for an impromptu poetry recital by Symbolist Ion Minulescu, with Octavian Goga in the audience. He was mostly impressed by Goga, who also represented the form of Romanian nationalism that Eminescu himself had embraced. His newfound fascination with Bucharest's bohemians saw him slipping back into scholarly mediocrity during his fifth year, but, as he notes, his yearly examination was rigged in his favor; his German-language examiner, Aurel Popovici, assumed that he could speak the language only because his uncle "spoke it to perfection." Eminescu was then sent to complete his sixth and seventh year at Tulcea, in Northern Dobruja, where another uncle ("the only one for whom my father had a great affection") ran the port administration.

=== Army career ===
In 1913, due to "my extracurricular activity", Eminescu found himself under interdiction to attend any civilian high school in Romania. In one of his manuscripts, he clarifies that his expulsion was largely due to his participation in a riot against the Tulcea segment of the Social Democratic Party; elsewhere, he noted having been singled out for his organization of a literary festival and his leadership of Avântul student society. Eminescu's relatives stepped in, and decided that he should follow an officer's career. As he later confessed to literary historian Anghel Popa, he felt no special calling for military life, to which he now preferred writing. Eminescu tried to back out of the career imposed on him by never showing up for his entry-level examination, but the Condeescus, using their connections in high places, arranged that he still be matriculated. During his subsequent military training, he developed a lifelong friendship with Gheorghe Mihail, the future Army General. Eminescu finally graduated from a military academy just as Romania was entering World War I.

A Sublieutenant at the time, Eminescu then fought in the 35th Infantry Regiment during the Romanian Campaign, seeing action in Northern Dobruja and the Battle of the Argeș, then withdrawing into Western Moldavia. He earned distinction in the defense of Mărășești, serving under poet Andrei Naum; he took command of the 2nd Machine Gunners Company when both Naum and the company commander, Radu Nicolae, were killed in action. His memoirs record his frustration with the Imperial Russian Army, whom he regarded as an excessively lackadaisical ally of the Romanians. Eminescu was afterwards captured by the German Army and sent to an internment camp in Germany. He was well treated by his captors, and, as his daughter reports, became an avid Germanophile. In 1917, he was in Bucharest, and helped Albert Espey of the Imperial German Army, who was passionate about Romanian literature, from which he would later translate. Together, they visited a locally famous folk musician Lăutar Iancu, who gave them a poetry recital.

After the separate peace of May 1918, Eminescu rejoined the Romanian Army, which, under Ernest Broșteanu, moved into Bessarabia to displace left-wing insurgents. Eminescu witnessed Broșteanu's difficulties in dealing with the Moldavian Democratic Republic, and always resented the latter's political leader, Ion Inculeț. Advanced to Lieutenant, in late 1918 he commanded the Gunners' Company of Bălți, stationed in Gheorghe Râșcanu's townhouse; he answered to Colonel Victor Bacaloglu, a fellow writer. It was in these circumstances that he witnessed the Khotyn Uprising (which he regarded as a Bolshevik incursion) and its aftermath. His notes on these events report that the quashing was brutal: he personally observed an incident during which Captain Mociulschi shot a railway signalman, accused of having assisted a partisans' raid on Ocnița.

The following twenty years saw the territorial consolidation of Greater Romania, which Eminescu regarded as a fulfillment of a personal and national ideal. For his wartime service, Eminescu, who spent another 14 years in Bessarabia, was awarded the medal Virtutea Ostășească, First Class. Much of the interwar years, and overall as many as thirty years of Eminescu's life, were spent researching Napoleon's biography. He was in charge of guarding the Bessarabian border between Romania and the Soviet Union, first as a company commander in Cetatea Albă, then as the leader of a battalion in Ismail (overseeing the section of the border between Galați and Tighina). He also served on a Soviet–Romanian military panel, which was tasked with reducing border incidents. In September 1924, he was confronted with the Tatarbunary Uprising, which was instigated by the Soviets, and during which his battalion lost three men. Eminescu would later argue that the violent outcome could have been averted, had Romanian commanders placed more trust in intelligence reports.

During the floods of early 1931, Gheorghe Eminescu was in Jibrieni and Galilești, helping to evict the local population, and detonating ice jams on the Danube. He was later moved further south, in Dobruja, serving with garrisons in Cernavodă and Medgidia. By the time of World War II, he commanded the border guards of Brăila, as a Lieutenant Colonel; he also taught military history to young cadets. His father had unusually moved in 1924 to Bistrița, in newly acquired Transylvania—as the only Eminescu ever to settle in that area during the 20th century; he spent the remainder of his life there, up to his death from pneumonia in December 1929. His wife survived him and, in 1940, was living "in seclusion, on a small and narrow street in Cluj". The Lieutenant Colonel's half-brother, Victor, had reportedly squandered his entire family inheritance, and had moved to Bucharest with his two daughters. All three were reportedly living in extreme poverty by the start of World War II, with Victor dying in 1949.

Eminescu married a local Bessarabian, Elena Labunțev (or Labunțeva), in Cetatea Albă's Ascension Cathedral. In 1921, she gave birth to Yolanda (or Iolanda) Eminescu. The Labunțev family was originally from Șaba, Cetatea Albă County. During 1938, Yolanda was in Fascist Italy, studying at the Summer University for foreign students. She graduated with high honors from the University of Bucharest Faculty of Law in 1944. Eminescu's father-in-law, Ștefan Labunțev, was the headmaster of a Bessarabian school, and reportedly took pride in his matrimonial alliance; after the 1940–1941 Soviet takeover of Bessarabia, he remained in occupied territory, while Ștefan's wife Maria joined the Eminescus in Brăila.

=== Imprisonment and return as a scholar ===
In 1944, the Lieutenant Colonel had passed into the reserves, and, alongside Captain Petre Penescu, was running "G. Eminescu & Co.", which owned a nail-making factory in Brăila. The anti-Nazi coup of 1944, which brought Romania into the Allied camp, also allowed for the restoration of multiparty democracy. Eminescu was persuaded by his friends to join the National Peasants' Party (PNȚ). His name appeared among the first of a list of party recruits, though, by his own account, his activity there was minimal. Eminescu's life changed upon the close of World War II, as Bessarabia was again incorporated with the Soviet Union and Romania herself came under a communist regime. A samizdat he bequeathed to Popa describes his sense of having been part of the accursed "generation of 1916", destined to both bring about Greater Romania and then see its downfall. He also notes his bewilderment at having grown up between an age when the British Empire seemed indestructible and one in which "communism took over one third of the globe." The regime, backed by Soviet occupation troops until 1957, inaugurated a clampdown on dissent, which resulted in Eminescu's dishonorable discharge and arrest in 1947.

Eminescu's nominal position as a PNȚ founder was brought up against him during the subsequent investigations. He was originally held for "failure to denounce" a political crime, but was later found guilty of a more serious charge, namely "conspiracy against the social order". During the searching of his place, his Napoleon manuscripts were also confiscated. In later years, he mentioned having done "hard time in jail, but without going into further details." In the early 1950s, he was held at Jilava Prison, in the narrow place designated as Șerpăria (the "Snake Place"); fellow inmate Ion Deboveanu recalls that Eminescu's sleeping area had a width of only 25 centimeters (10 inches). Deboveanu also notes that he used to entertain cellmates with stories about his father and his uncle. Eminescu was sent to Aiud prison, alongside old-regime figures such as Istrate Micescu, Nichifor Crainic, and Radu Gyr. One eyewitness recounts that "our great poet's nephew" was among those made to stand for hours with their feet in freezing water; when asked how Romanians had allowed themselves such moral decay, Eminescu replied: "nothing should be of surprise in this country, where history is produced by the likes of Mihai Ralea, with Ana Pauker as our foreign minister!"

Eminescu was finally a laborer at Ocnele Mari, Vâlcea County, and at Peninsula, on the Danube–Black Sea Canal. He was released in 1954, after carrying out his 7-year term in jail. Meanwhile, the Soviet occupation went in tandem with the Soviet incorporation of Bessarabia (as the Moldavian SSR). During the mid 1950s, the Romanian Ukrainian scholar Constantin Popovici was in Romania as part of the KGB staff, and preparing his literary biography of Mihai Eminescu. To this end, he approached Gheorghe Eminescu, with whom he had a "long correspondence". Eminescu's daughter, appointed in 1945 as one of Romania's first three female judges, became an academic in 1949, focusing on international copyright law. During her father's imprisonment, she was sidelined and repeatedly interrogated; forced out of the legal profession, she found employment as a tailor and artisan shoemaker. She was only allowed back as a librarian (a researcher from 1954), and could advance professionally after 1965. In 1947, she had given birth to daughter Roxana, whose father was the ophthalmologist Ștefan Stătescu. After marrying fellow jurist Valentin A. Georgescu, Yolanda joined the ranks of the communist nomeklatura. According to Anghel Popa, this is what allowed her to lecture at Western universities, where Gheorghe's granddaughter was also educated. According to her own memoirs, she was continuously harassed by agents of the Securitate (Communist Romania's secret police), including one of her father's case workers.

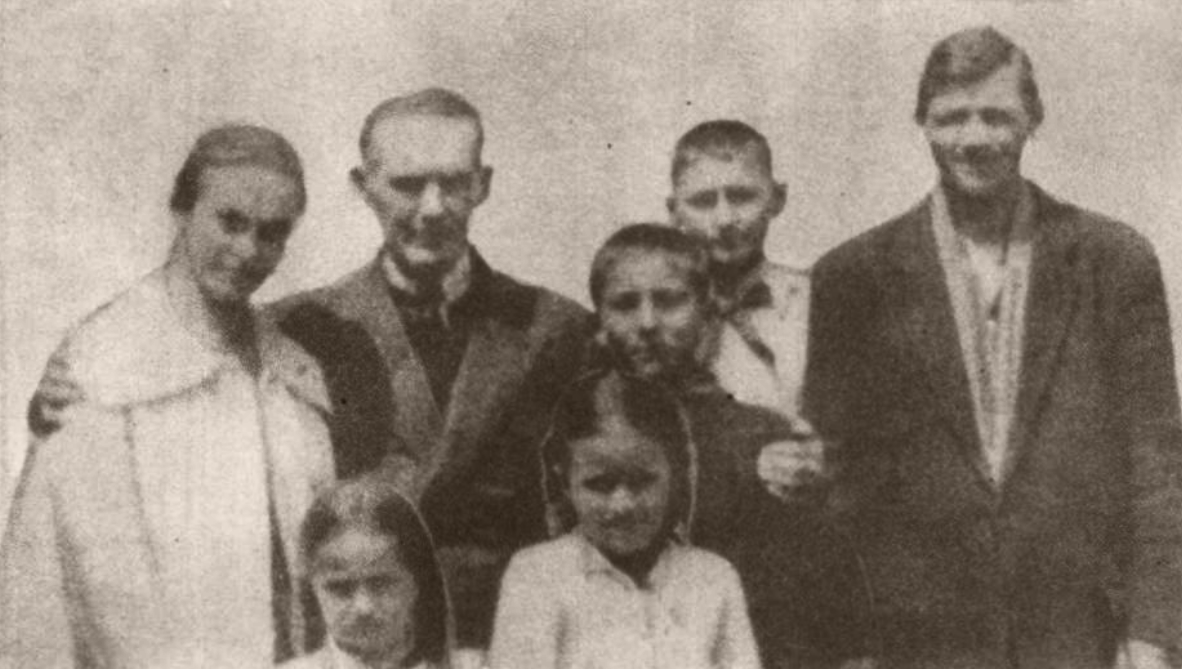
The Colonel and other Eminescu descendants, photographed in 1969

Gheorghe Eminescu appeared alongside Augustin Z. N. Pop at literary festivals, including one held in Constanța during April 1963, and another one held at Mircești that December. In June 1964, he appeared at Iași's Central University Library, where he spoke about the poet. As noted by teacher Ștefan Stănoiu: "Preserving Raluca's physical features, precisely the same ones that the poet himself had inherited [...], Gheorghe Eminescu brought to life several moments from the poet's life, revealing Mihail's [sic] attitude toward the governing classes, as well as their indifference and adversity toward the poet." By the 1970s, the Lieutenant Colonel had moved with Elena, his wife of 60 years, into a home on Laurențiu Claudian Street, in the eastern Bucharest neighborhood of Iancului. He lived a secluded existence under the Nicolae Ceaușescu regime and its national communism—maintaining a private "cult of Greater Romania, of [his uncle] The Poet, and of Napoleon", while receiving regular visits from Popa and from his wartime orderly, Marin Stan. By his own estimations, he owned the largest book collection in Romania, which Yolanda supplied with most of what had been published in French about the Napoleonic era.

Eminescu's other interest was in documenting the life of his famous uncle, but met with the rigors of communist censorship. As Popa recalls, he was noticeably upset that his uncle had been deemed a "Moldovan" poet in the Soviet Union—where poems such as Doina, which stated his Romanian nationalism, had been left "forgotten". In 1973, with help from the local schoolteachers' union, he published in Deva a collection of primary sources, Profil eminescian ("Eminescian Profile"). In April of that year, he began corresponding with literary historian Al. Husar, discussing his other work, in Napoleonic studies. A long-time member of Ion Hangiu's Society of Romanian Philologists, he traveled annually to Ipotești to take part in commemorations of Mihai Eminescu's death. He stopped doing so in 1979, when the regime allowed I. D. Marian to publish an Eminescu monograph that the Lieutenant Colonel saw as blasphemous. He expressed his revolt in a short article, which was allowed for print in România Literară.

=== Final years ===
The Lieutenant Colonel (readmitted as such in the socialist army reserves) was again able to focus on writing about Napoleon, which resulted in a 1973 monograph that Deboveanu calls "one of the most important Romanian contributions to the personality study of France's hero." The manuscript had been registered with Editura Academiei by the time of Napoleon's bicentennial in 1969, but its publication was delayed. The work was positively reviewed by the local press, and sent by Eminescu to Napoléon VI, who offered his praise and gratitude in a letter to the author. A derivative monograph, detailing the French Revolution and Napoleon's career between Valmy and Waterloo, was sent for review at Editura Junimea of Iași. This was after Eminescu had refused contracts with Editura Albatros and Editura Militară, finding the latter to be especially dislikable. During the negotiations with Junimea, he was persuaded to include commentary that would contextualize the Reign of Terror, and to review the conflict between Danton and Robespierre as one of ideology, rather than character. The book was never published, since, as Eminescu found out through literary critic Constantin Ciopraga, the manuscript was mishandled and lost. Eminescu himself was convinced that the editorial director Mircea Radu Iacoban had hidden the work, and that he intended to have it published under Corneliu Sturzu's name, once Eminescu had died. As a sign of protest, he would never allow his work to be published in Sturzu's journal, Convorbiri Literare. His private notebooks vituperated as some length against the Convorbiri Literare group.

While trying to rewrite his lost manuscript, Eminescu also finished another one, dedicated to the French Revolution. As he argued in his letters to Husar, it was to be Romania's "first original work on the topic", and also "my own leading work"—he worried that "one of the numerous pseudo-historians who can't stomach me" would end up rejecting it. This contribution was indeed never published, and neither was his play about the life and times of Joseph Fouché. From 1976 on, he was absorbed by work on his samizdat memoirs, well aware that, especially given their accounts of political and military affairs in Bessarabia, "no publishing house would even bother with them." Eventually persuaded that Ceaușescu's communism would enter a more liberal phase and that historical writing would be allowed to take place outside "conjectural canons", he sent some of the more politically charged fragments to be read and kept by a communist potentate and social scientist, Ion Popescu-Puțuri. Some parts were delivered to other admirers, while the more innocuous chapters remained in the Eminescu home.

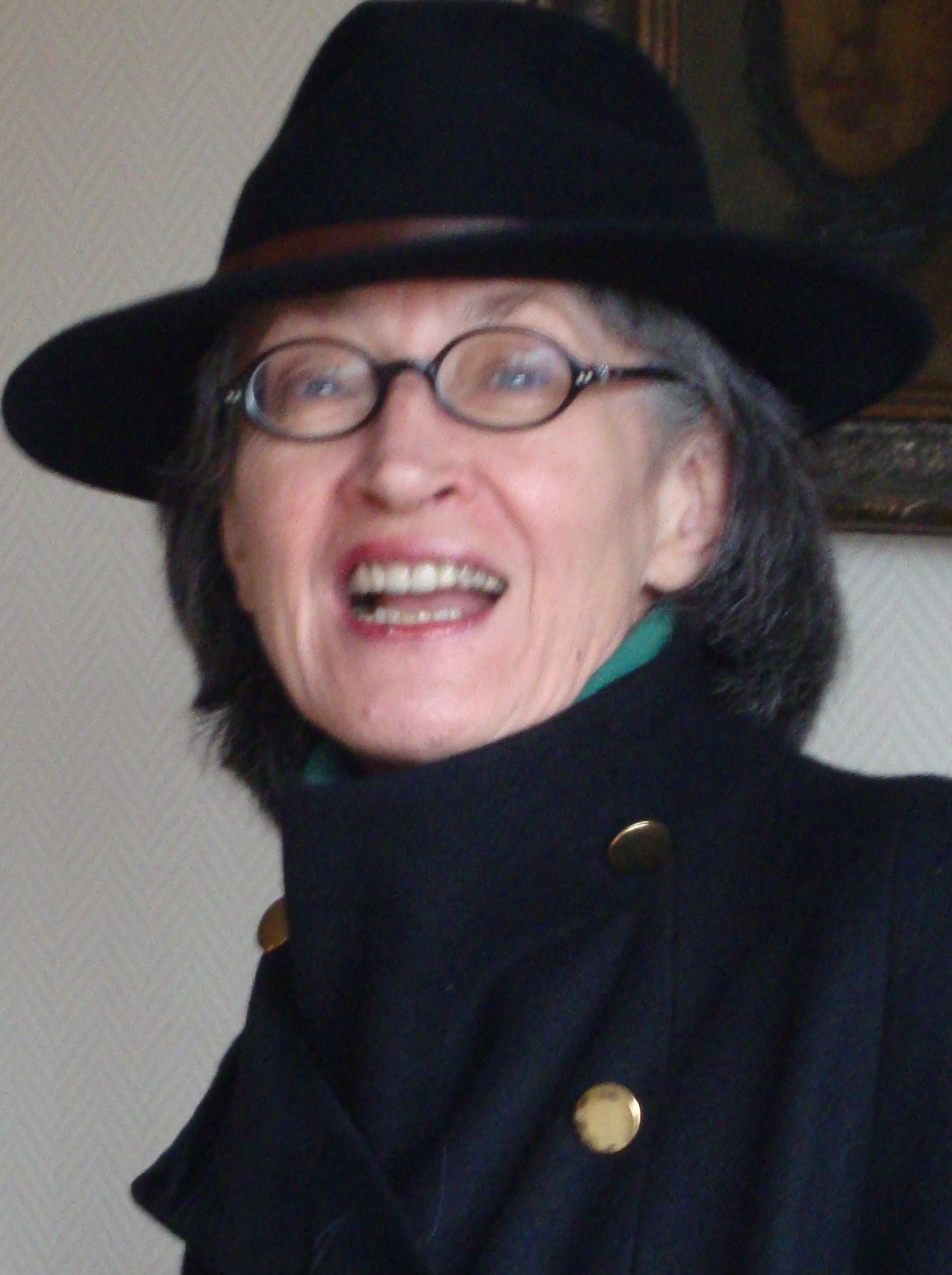
Eminescu's granddaughter, Roxana Eminescu, in 2011

During that interval, Roxana Eminescu studied linguistics with Iorgu Iordan. She specialized in Portuguese literature, after being introduced to the poetry of Fernando Pessoa by a member of the Portuguese Communist Party, who was living in exile in Romania. She was also known locally for having introduced Fernando Arrabal's plays to Romania in the late 1970s (when she devised anti-censorship mechanisms by presenting him as a political author), but recalls being pressured by Ceaușescu's Securitate into becoming a spy. In order to escape this constraint, in 1981 she left with a student visa to Lisbon, where she ultimately defected. After gaining employment at the University of Lisbon, she decided to leave for France, and obtained French citizenship. She had married a twin brother of actress Aimée Iacobescu, from whom she has a son, Ion Teodor Eminescu-Iacobescu (born 1985).

In October 1980, Gheorghe Eminescu and his daughter, alongside Iosif Constantin Drăgan, were guests of the Maiorescu Literary Circle, presided upon by Gavril Iosif Chiuzbaian. In 1982, Gheorghe was interviewed by poet Corneliu Vadim Tudor, who wrote that he bore a "striking resemblance" to his uncle, "which only the white hair and blue eyes of this old man will refute." As the Lieutenant Colonel noted in that interview, he had by then donated all of his family memorabilia to Augustin Z. N. Pop. One of Eminescu's last published contributions, included in the third issue of Limba și Literatura Română in 1981, was an autobiographical record of his participation in the battle of Mărășești; in 1986, he revised for print a second edition of his Napoleon biography. In January 1984, Eminescu returned to Mizil, where he was interviewed by writer George Stoian. Also that month, he was in Slobozia, where his unscripted lecture at Eminesciana Festival was also recorded for posterity.

In 1986, the aging scholar was visited by another military historian, Titu Popescu, who interviewed him about his life—including about his time at Aiud. An article by Eminescu, describing the final decay of the Ancien Régime, appeared in Magazin Istoric in July 1987, with a biographical note introducing him as a "historical writer" and the "nephew of our great national poet". Gheorghe Eminescu sat down for a final interview with Vadim Tudor, which was recorded on video. Around that time, he allowed a lyrical, testament-like, piece of his to be published, as his only official poem. A heavy smoker, throughout the 1980s he was suffering from infections of the airways and lungs, which finally caused his death on 6 June 1988 (reportedly, this occurred in his Claudian Street home, where he had lived as a widower since October 1984).

== Legacy ==
The Colonel was survived by his daughter (who died in 1998, four years after her husband), and by his granddaughter Roxana, who had achieved tenure at the University of Western Brittany. Gheorghe's uncle Victor left his own line of female descendants: daughters Natalia, Aglaia, and Didona, who respectively worked as a nurse, an artisan bookbinder, and a schoolteacher in Predeal. A niece, born from Ecaterina Eminescu's marriage to inventor Aurel Persu, was living in Ploiești during the 1990s. Roxana Eminescu described herself as a "profoundly left-wing woman" and a "true atheist", noting that she had no intention of ever returning to Romania, which she described as a land of "bigotry". She added: "Ceaușescuism has not turned me into a conservative, nor a nationalist, nor an anticommunist." In late 1989, she signed her name to a protest against Ceaușescu, publicized through Radio Free Europe.

Around that time, some of Gheorghe Eminescu's "family recollections" appeared as part of an anthology, issued by Editura Dacia of Cluj-Napoca. They include fragments on his uncle's purported meetings with the Romanian queen, Elisabeth of Wied—revisited in 2023 by scholar Elena Vulcănescu, who found Gheorghe's input on this matter to be historically irrelevant and "boorish". This publication was shortly followed by the Romanian Revolution, which toppled communism—also lifting censorship of Gheorghe Eminescu's manuscripts and political statements. By early 1993, Vadim Tudor was accusing the national television channel of refusing to air the 1987 interview; it was eventually broadcast on 17 June. In 1995, the Ministry of Culture sponsored an edition of Eminescu's memoirs. For reasons largely not explained, these only featured parts not in the Eminescus' possession; the section assigned to Popescu-Puțuri is thought to have been lost. His recollections of the Khotyn Uprising were recovered separately, and appeared in ARCA magazine in 1996. During that same period, Yolanda engaged in a dispute with the Romanian Writers' Union, which had granted recognition to "so-called inheritors" of Eminescu, who, she argued, had usurped the family name.
