= Postal codes in Ukraine =

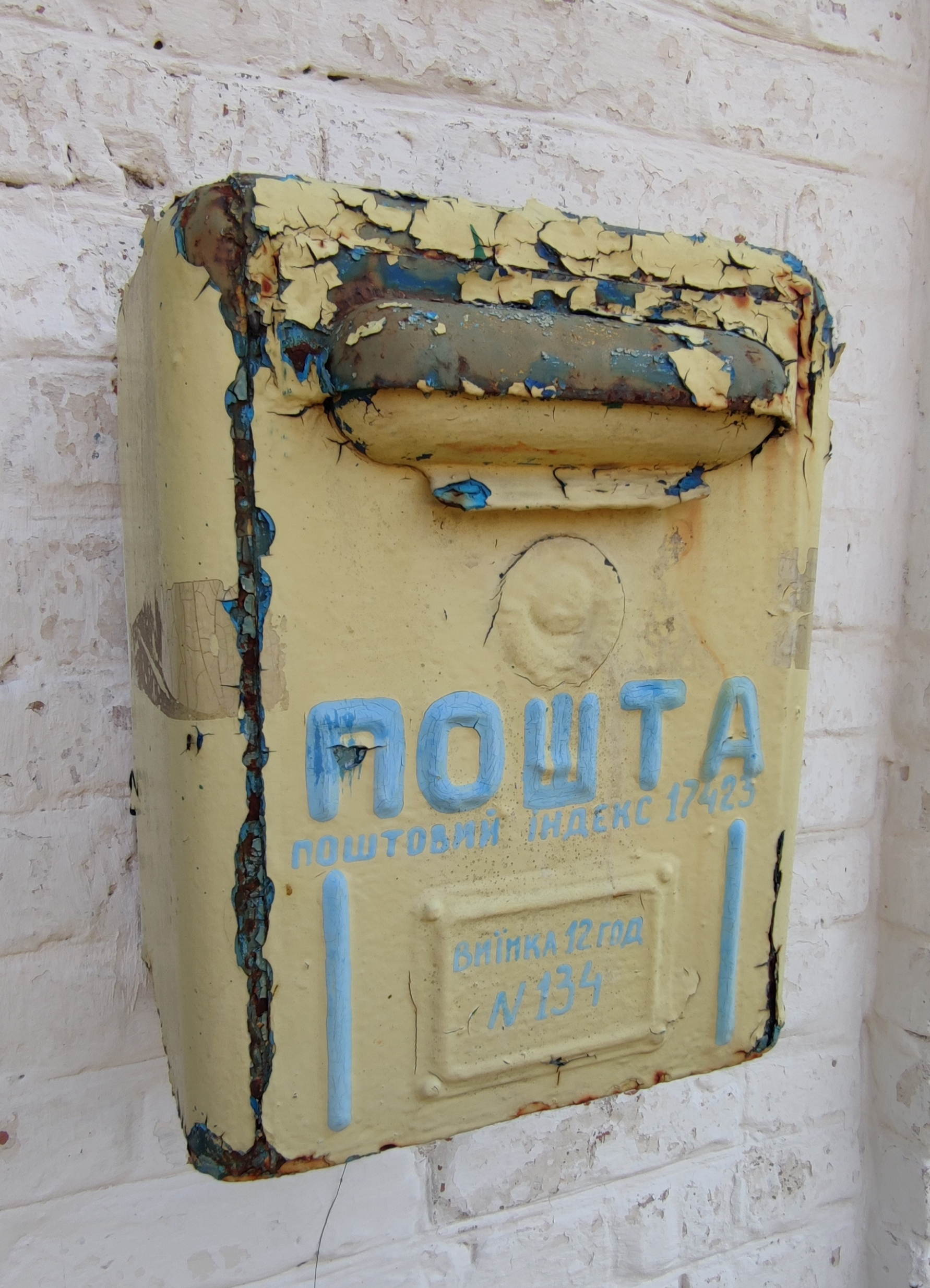
A former USSR postbox in Ukraine.

Ukraine uses five-digit numeric postal codes that are written immediately to the right of the city or settlement name.

The codes are allocated to all settlements with a population of more than 500 irrespective of a post office presence; habitations with smaller population share a postal code of the closest code-marked settlement. All Ukraine Post Offices ("Ukrpost / Укрпошта") have post code books that may be purchased; alternatively, postal code for a given address can be found at a dedicated website. Postal codes of the territories occupied by Russian military forces (Crimean peninsula and parts of Donetsk and Luhansk oblast) remain included into Ukrainian national postal index as "postal offices temporarily out of service".

== First two digits ==
First two digits of Ukrainian postal code can change from 01 to 99 ("00" combination is not used at the first two positions) indicating national-level administrative units of state governance:

1. Kyiv – based on its size and capital status, postal codes starting with combinations 01-06 are assigned;
2. Oblasts – each of 24 oblasts is assigned several pairs of digits (2 to 6), where the smallest pair is used for postal encoding in the oblast's capital city;
3. Autonomous Republic of Crimea – the same postal code system as oblasts;
4. Sevastopol – city with special status of national-level governance, where postal codes begin with "99".

Furthermore, one pair of first two postal code digits ("50") is assigned to the city of Kryvyi Rih in Dnipropetrovsk Oblast as an exemption.

Example:

68 – Odesa Oblast, raions of south part.

Subdivision	Postal Code (first two digits)
Autonomous Republic of Crimea	95-98
Cherkasy Oblast	18-20
Chernihiv Oblast	14-17
Chernivtsi Oblast	58-60
Dnipropetrovsk Oblast	49-53
Donetsk Oblast	83-87
Ivano-Frankivsk Oblast	76-78
Kharkiv Oblast	61-64
Kherson Oblast	73-75
Khmelnytskyi Oblast	29-32
Kirovohrad Oblast	25-28
Kyiv	01-06
Kyiv Oblast	07-09
Luhansk Oblast	91-94
Lviv Oblast	79-82
Mykolaiv Oblast	54-57
Odesa Oblast	65-69
Poltava Oblast	36-39
Rivne Oblast	33-35
Sevastopol	99
Sumy Oblast	40-42
Ternopil Oblast	46-49
Vinnytsia Oblast	21-24
Volyn Oblast	43-45
Zakarpattya Oblast	88-90
Zaporizhzhia Oblast	69-72
Zhytomyr Oblast	10-13

== Third digit ==
The third digit of Ukrainian postal code indicates lower level of administrative units: raions and towns of oblast-level subordination.

Examples:

683 – Odesa Oblast, former Kiliia Raion;

680 – Odesa Oblast, Chornomorsk (town of oblast-level subordination).

== Fourth and fifth digit ==
These digits indicate numbers of individual post offices (or an individual settlement, if it has a single post office).

For central post offices of raions and of oblast-level subordination towns, the fourth and fifth digits are "00";

For indication of post offices in oblasts' capital cities, capital of the Autonomous Republic of Crimea, as well as in Kyiv and Sevastopol, postal code digits from third to fifth are used;

In case of the oblast's central post office (always located in the oblast's capital city), a postal code with "000" at positions 3-5 is used;

For indication of inter-raion communication centers, regional centers of mail collection and processing, railway post offices and other special post offices which are not associated with specific territory, digits "999" are used at positions 3-5 of postal code.

Examples:

65000 – Odesa city, oblast's central post office;

65029 – Odesa city, post office 29;

68300 – Odesa Oblast, former Kiliia Raion, raion's central post office;

68355 – Odesa Oblast, former Kiliia Raion, post office in the city Vylkove.
