= Klyushnikov =

Klyushnikov (Russian: Клюшников), feminine: Klyushnikova, is a Russian occupational surname, derived from the position/occupation of kluyshnik, "key bearer". Notable people with the surname include:

- Andrei Klyushnikov (1892–1924), Soviet Bolshevik
- Viktor Klyushnikov (1841–1892), Russian writer, editor and journalist

== See also ==
- Klyuchnikov
