= Făcăi =

Făcăi may refer to several places in Romania:

- Făcăi, a village administered by Craiova municipality, Dolj County
- Făcăi, a village administered by Ocnele Mari town, Vâlcea County
