= Ocnele Mari Prison =

Ocnele Mari's Prison

Ocnele Mari Prison was a prison located in Ocnele Mari, Vâlcea County, Romania.

== History ==
=== Early years ===
Prior to the communist regime, the prison was for common criminals with life terms, forced to work in the nearby salt mine. Mihail Gheorghiu Bujor was the first political prisoner to be detained there, in 1920. The nine leaders of the Tatarbunary Uprising were brought to Ocnele Mari in 1924. Romanian Communist Party activists such as Gheorghe Gheorghiu-Dej and Chivu Stoica were also held there, in 1935–1936. From 1948 to 1953, the prison held Securitate detainees not convicted in court. At one point, it had 500 prisoners: 279 Iron Guard affiliates, 38, 17, and 16, respectively, from the National Peasants' Party, National Liberal Party, and Social Democratic Party, 98 Interior Ministry cadres, and 52 common criminals. They worked in a wood shop. Ocnele Mari became one of the most important concentration camps for fighters from the Romanian anti-communist resistance movement.

During this period, the regimen was one of extermination, based on torture, hunger, and lack of medical care. Although many of the guards were locals, they did not dare to discuss what happened inside the walls or about the cart carrying dead prisoners to the cemetery at night, to be buried in unmarked graves. Among the dead were Gheorghe Grama, first tortured to the point of madness; Andrei Nicola, peasantist senator, and Gheorghe Niculescu-Malu, leading social-democratic activist. The poet and writer Vasile Militaru, a good friend of the composer George Enescu, arrived at Ocnele Mari at the age of 74, after receiving a 32-year sentence for conspiring against the social order and possession of prohibited publications; he died in July 1959, after 18 days of detention.

Petre Pandrea, imprisoned there from December 1948 to March 1952, recalled the perennial problem of spoiled, insufficient food, augmented by overcrowding. There was no running water or sewage system. The pervasive filth bred bedbugs, leading prisoners to sleep with socks on their hands. Solitary confinement was carried out inside the white tower at the entrance, in dirty, smelly, suffocating, mouse-infested cells.

Prisoners would catch linden leaves blown into their cells by the wind, chewing one per day in an effort to ward off the very common ailments of scurvy, vitamin deficiency and tooth decay. Many barely managed to climb down to use the toilets dug into the yard. Medical visits were purely formal, prisoners were banned from receiving medicines from their families, and imprisoned doctors often had to operate with scissors or blades reddened in the fire. Prisoners alleviated boredom through conversation; there was also an organized “underground academy” led by Pandrea.

The main form of extermination of prisoners was planned starvation. The guards had come to calculate with precision the day when a starving prisoner would die. The menu consisted of porridge (boiled corn), potato soup, beans or chives, and vegetables; a detainee was not entitled to more than 800 grams of potatoes per week, 100 grams of chives, 300 grams of onions, and several tens of grams of corn, sugar, or coffee. Later, they received even less food; rations were constantly reduced until many of the inmates began to die from extreme anemia and chronic diseases. It has been estimated that the number of calories needed by the human body for survival is around 1,200; however, at that time, the caloric value of the daily menu at Ocnele Mari prison did not even exceed 600 calories. The older inmates were the first to suffer from cachexia and were doomed to perish.

==== “Re-education” ====
The prison was a center for “re-education”. This was carried out not only through forced labor but also through the method used at Pitești Prison. In 1951, a group of students, veterans of the process, arrived from there. The administration offered them three cells to carry out their experiment, the windows were painted black and the guards prohibited entry. According to Pandrea's recollection, the prisoners called the new arrivals “Makarenko teams”, showing they understood the Soviet origin of what was unfolding. Detainees were isolated and forced to unmask themselves, to write down what they had not told under Securitate interrogation. Torture and questioning went on only after midnight. Targets were beaten until fainting, then awoken with urine poured on their faces from the common chamber-pot. Isolation and torture continued for three to six months.

Those who refused were beaten with bats, broomsticks and boots by the “re-educated”, who competed in ferocity in order not to be suspected themselves. Between sessions, the victim had to stand for hours on end facing the wall, or to sit on the bed from five in the morning until ten at night. The victims were generally older, believed to be unable to resist the torture; nevertheless, they did manage to resist and to warn others about what was happening. Petre Țuțea, Mihail Manoilescu, Virgil Solomon, and Ion Victor Vojen threatened to commit suicide en masse unless the torture stopped. The experiment was abandoned: total isolation could not be maintained like in Pitești, and fearing that the atrocities would be heard about, the Interior Ministry stopped the unmaskings.

Other prisoners included Iancu Arnăuțoiu (member of the anti-communist resistance movement led by son, Toma Arnăuțoiu), Generals Gheorghe Mihail and Dumitru Coroamă, Gheorghe Cristescu, Aurel Dobrescu, Emil Hațieganu, Aurel Leucuția, Mihai Popovici, and Savel Rădulescu. Also detained were ordinary workers and peasants who had stood up to the regime. In mid-1950, some of the more prominent detainees were sent to Sighet or Aiud Prison.

A series of significant figures of the Romanian intelligentsia and simple people, linked to the anti-communist struggle, were exterminated at Ocnele Mari and buried anonymously in the Bozeasca Cemetery. The penitentiary remains as one of the harshest detention centers in the history of Romania, where the unbearable conditions contributed decisively to the mental and physical destruction of the prisoner.

=== Later years ===
The prison population changed in 1953. First, existing prisoners were transferred elsewhere. Then, after work on the Danube–Black Sea Canal was halted and detainees there sent to Aiud, a selection was made. Between three and four hundred prisoners who were mildly ill, old or unable to work were sent on to Ocnele Mari. This group had been sentenced at trial. In some cases, their sentences had expired as far back as 1951, but were lengthened via administrative decision. In 1953–1954, torture and hunger abated, and no deaths were recorded. Prisoners could wear their home clothes, although these were often falling apart.

Administrative sentences were abandoned in 1954, when many were freed, although some were kept at the behest of the Securitate. Late that year, a group of Interior Ministry employees was brought from Baia Sprie mine. At the height of the prison population in 1948–1952, each cell held around 70 men; in 1954, there were no more than ten.

In 1956–1957, the prison received Interior Ministry cadres sentenced for various offenses. These included a group from Salcia labor camp. Sentenced to lengthy terms following the deaths of 63 detainees, they were freed in 1957. In 1959, the prison became a youth penitentiary, holding youngsters who had escaped repeatedly from other facilities. In turn, they were sent to Sfântu Gheorghe in 1963. In autumn 1964, a salt mine collapsed, forming a saltwater lake. The prison was soon closed and demolished; a monument commemorating the detainees of the Communist regime was erected in 2009 in Ocnița, just a few hundred meters from where the penitentiary was.
