= Myrne, Izmail Raion, Odesa Oblast =

Rural locality in Odesa Oblast, Ukraine

Myrne Мирне (Ukrainian) Caracica (Romanian)
- Location in Ukraine Myrne (Odesa Oblast)
- Coordinates: 45°31′N 29°36′E
- Country: Ukraine
- Oblast: Odesa Oblast
- Raion: Izmail Raion
- Hromada: Vylkove urban hromada
- Time zone: UTC+2 (EET)
  - Summer (DST): UTC+3 (EEST)

Myrne (Ukrainian: Мирне; Romanian: Caracica) is a village in Izmail Raion, Odesa Oblast, Ukraine. It belongs to Vylkove urban hromada, one of the hromadas of Ukraine.

Until 18 July 2020, Myrne belonged to Kiliia Raion. The raion was abolished in July 2020 as part of the administrative reform of Ukraine, which reduced the number of raions of Odesa Oblast to seven. The area of Kiliia Raion was merged into Izmail Raion.
