= Vylkove urban hromada =

Coordinates: 45°24′32.6″N 29°47′45.8″E

Vylkove urban hromada Вилківська міська громада
- Hromada
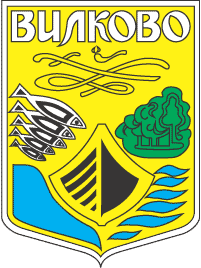
- Coat of arms
- Interactive map of Vylkove urban hromada
- Country: Ukraine
- Oblast: Odesa Oblast
- Raion: Izmail Raion
- Admin. center: Vylkove

Area
  - Total: 479.71 km^{2} (185.22 sq mi)

Population (2020)
  - Total: 12,883
  - Density: 26.856/km^{2} (69.556/sq mi)
- CATOTTG code: UA51080010000087690
- Settlements: 6
- Cities: 1
- Rural settlements: 1
- Villages: 4

Vylkove urban hromada (Ukrainian: Вилківська міська громада) is a hromada (municipality) in Ukraine, in Izmail Raion of Odesa Oblast. The administrative center is the city of Vylkove. Population: 11,452 (2022 estimate)

Until 18 July 2020, the hromada belonged to Kiliia Raion. The raion was abolished in July 2020 as part of the administrative reform of Ukraine, which reduced the number of raions of Odesa Oblast to seven. The area of Kiliia Raion was merged into Izmail Raion.

== Settlements ==
The hromada consists of 1 city (Vylkove), one rural settlement (Bile) and 4 villages: Desantne, Myrne, Novomykolaivka and Prymorske.
