= Ioan Luchian Mihalea =

Romanian musician (1951–1993)

Ioan Luchian Mihalea (Romanian pronunciation: [iˈo̯an lukiˈan miˈhale̯a]; 1951 in Ocnele Mari – 29 November 1993 in Bucharest) was a Romanian composer, conductor and television producer. He was the founder and leader of the vocal group Song and the children's choir Minisong. On 29 November 1993, Mihalea was murdered in his apartment in the Drumul Taberei neighborhood of Bucharest by Nelu Florian Gavrilă and Ionel Păun. The motive for the crime was robbery. The criminals were sentenced to life imprisonment. Mihalea is buried in Bellu cemetery, Bucharest.
