= Tatarbunary Uprising =

Romanian peasant revolt (1924)

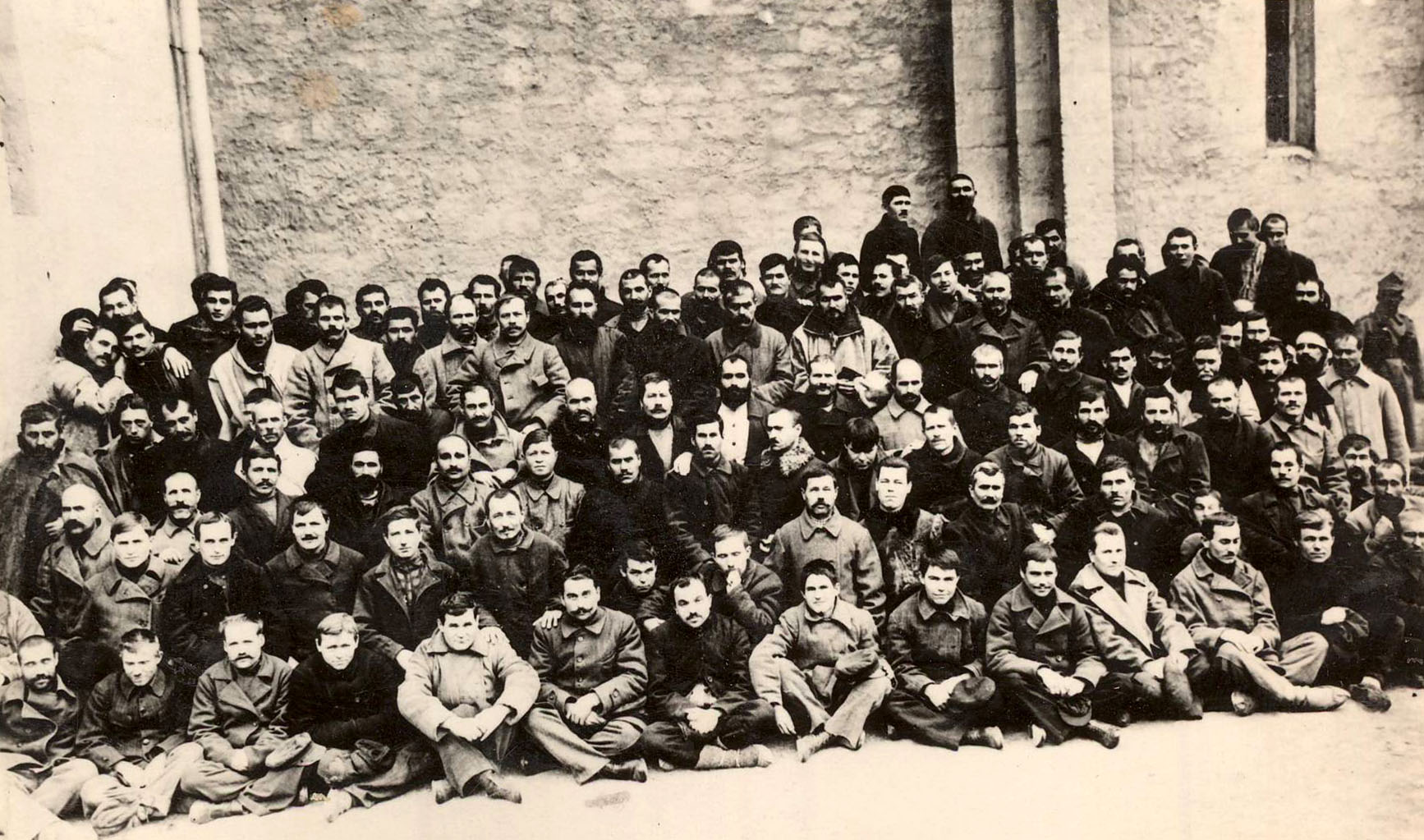
- A group of rebels participating in the uprising
Date	15–18 September 1924
Location	Tatarbunary and neighbouring areas, Kingdom of Romania (now part of Ukraine)
Result	Revolt quelled by Romanian authorities

Belligerents
Tatarbunary Revolutionary Committee; Supported by: Soviet Union	(Kingdom of Romania) Romanian Royal Army (Kingdom of Romania) Romanian Danube Flotilla (Kingdom of Romania) Romanian Gendarmerie

Commanders and leaders
Andrei Klyushnikov †; Iustin Batișcev	(Kingdom of Romania) King Ferdinand I

Strength
4,000–6,000 rebels	Unknown

Casualties and losses
- 3,000 deaths overall 1,600 rebels arrested

The Tatarbunary Uprising (Romanian: Răscoala de la Tatarbunar) was a peasant revolt that took place on 15–18 September 1924, in and around the town of Tatarbunary in the Bugeac, Romania (now Odesa Oblast, Ukraine). Inspired by Bolshevik ideals and supported by the newly-formed Soviet Union, it was led by a pro-Soviet revolutionary committee which called for the creation of a "Moldavian Soviet Republic" and an end to the "Romanian occupation" of Bessarabia.

The uprising was instigated and led by communists from across the Dniester region who were opposed to the establishment of Greater Romania and regarded the Moldovans as a distinct people (later that year, a Moldavian Autonomous Soviet Socialist Republic, roughly corresponding to Transnistria, was established inside the Ukrainian SSR). The Tatarbunary Uprising, as well as the uprisings of Khotyn and Bender, occurred in those regions in which there were very important demographic changes resulting from Tsarist Russia's policy of colonizing Bessarabia with large numbers of Ukrainians, Russians, Bulgarians, and other nationalities. American professor and expert in Moldovan issues Charles King however considers the revolt, along with other similar rebellions in Romanian-administered Bessarabia, as modern jacqueries.

== Background ==
=== Soviet–Romanian relations ===
After World War I relations between Romania and Soviet Russia were tense. Since 1918 there were numerous bilateral meetings in Copenhagen, Warsaw, Genoa, and other locations but no consensus could be reached. The Soviets saw Bessarabia as an annexed province and considered the decision of union with Romania as imposed by the occupying Romanian Army. Moreover, historians from both countries intensely debated the treaty with the Soviet Rumcherod in 1918 that required withdrawal of the Romanian Army from Bessarabia but which both countries failed to respect. The legitimacy of the Sfatul Țării was also brought into question, although the only contested decision was the unification act.

In December 1923, the sixth Conference of the Balkan Communist Federation adopted a resolution condemning what was called "Romania's expansionist nature". The Romanian state was accused that in 1918, taking advantage of Russia's weakness, it attached "large parts of other nations that achieved a superior political, economical and cultural level". It also says that, because of this, "the nationalities in Bessarabia, Bukovina, Dobrudja and Transylvania undertook a fight for self-determination". The documents adopted at the conference mentions that the internal policies of the bourgeois states in the Balkans after World War I suffered a failure and in order to resolve the problem they proposed the right of self-determination.

Between March 27 and April 2, 1924 negotiations took place in Vienna in order to relieve Soviet-Romanian relations. Romania did not recognize the newly constituted USSR and the countries had no diplomatic relations. The Romanian delegation was led by Constantin Langa-Rășcanu and the Soviets were led by Nikolay Krestinsky. The Soviet delegation immediately raised the Bessarabian question and diplomat Maxim Litvinov presented a plan to conduct a plebiscite in Bessarabia. The Romanian government rejected the referendum, viewing it as a Soviet public relations campaign. Langa-Rășcanu claimed that in the entire Soviet Union there never was any kind of plebiscite, citing Leon Trotsky. The Romanian delegation also insisted that the "eminent character" in Bessarabia is Romanian and that the population had "repeated acts of self-determination that make the plebiscite proposition a futile and offending request". On April 2, 1924, the Romanian delegation rejected the Soviet proposal and ceased negotiations with the Soviet Union.

=== Preparations ===
The Soviet government assessed that, in 1924, all the conditions were met for major actions against Romania which would justify the intervention of Soviet Army. Similar actions were prepared for other countries from the Baltic Sea to the Black Sea. On July 20, 1924 the Executive Committee of the Communist International (Comintern) issued a note to the central committees of Communist parties in Poland, Lithuania, Estonia, Romania, Czechoslovakia, and Yugoslavia, which stated that "the Russian proletariat is threatened with war from Romania". On this basis, a few weeks later, on August 8, under the presidency of Vasil Petrov Kolarov – secretary of the Balkan Communist Federation – a plan of action was drafted for Romania which was set to be implemented by mid-September. The Comintern approved the plan, which divided Romania into five action zones:

- North Zone – representing Bukovina, had the center of operation at Kamyanka (Romanian: Camenca, now Petriceni). The main goal of this force was to destroy the rail bridge connecting Cernăuți with Pașcani, thus isolating Bukovina from the rest of the country, and continue to Iași where it would link with other revolutionaries coming from Bessarabia.
- Bessarabia – had the main action zone in the south and it would advance to Galați with the help of a Soviet detachment that would cross the border at Olănești – Budachi – Tuzla. This was set to be the main action zone. Several munition deposits were prepared.

Osip Poliakov, known as Platov, was a fisherman from Vylkove. During the uprising he was designated as military commander.

- South-East Zone – comprising Dobrudja with the main centers at Călărași – Silistra – Mânăstirea. The plan was to destroy the bridge near Fetești that connected the province with Romania. Help would be provided by land troops from the Soviet Union.
- Banat and Hunedoara – here, the main proceedings were supported by Hungarian irredentists. The centers were Lugoj, Simeria, and Caransebeș.
- Northern Zone (Maramureș), Crișana, and Transylvania – only public manifestations of workers and peasants were planned. Centers were designated at Cluj, Dej, and Oradea.

The Soviet Union had asked not to be directly involved in the preparations. The only help would come from other Communists. In preparation, arms, munitions, and explosives were smuggled in boats across the Soviet-Romanian border, mainly at night. The plan relied on support from peasants who resented Romanian government's agricultural policy, particularly the land reform of 1921. The peasants' situation was aggravated due to a drought in summer 1924, which caused a famine in southern Bessarabia.

As main leaders, the Comintern appointed Ghiță Moscu (Moscovici Gelbert), Max Goldstein, and Kalifarski (ethnic Russian and activist in the Comintern). Andrei Klyushnikov, also known as Nenin, was responsible for coordinating the action, and the military commander in Bessarabia was Osip Poliakov, known as Platov.

The planned action in the North Zone had the purpose of inspiring other uprisings in Galicia. The first, fourth, and fifth zones were to begin action one week after the uprisings in the second and third zones. Even though the plan was complex, no significant events took place except for Tatarbunary and in the Danube port of Kiliia (Romanian: Chilia Nouă), where the uprising was quickly silenced.

=== Local preparations ===
Andrei Kliushnikov (Nenin), left, Nicolai Shishman (Afanasiev), center and Covali (dressed in Red Army uniform) on the right

In Southern Bessarabia, a Soviet Party Committee was created in May 1922 and the leaders were two Comintern agents – Andrei Klyushnikov (Nenin) and Nicolai Shishman (Afanasiev), together with three locals – Ivan Bejanovici (Kolţov or Pugaciov), Ivan Dobrovolski (Gromov) and Iustin Batișcev (Almazov). This committee was not subordinated to the Romanian Communist Party, but was under direct control from the Soviet Union. All the Communist organizations in Bessarabia were supported financially and materially by the Soviets as well as being under their direct control through the special centre in Odesa. Allegedly acting with instructions from the Intelligence Center in Odesa, members organized revolutionary committees in the three counties of Southern Bessarabia - Cahul, Ismail, and Cetatea Albă. A number of 25 villages and the cities of Cahul and Ismail were subject to these actions, all of them being inhabited mainly by Russians and Ukrainians. In each location the committees formed a special military detachment composed of a minimum 20-30 men together with a commander. Communications between committees were maintained by messengers.

Before and during the Vienna Conference a large group of Soviet agents infiltrated into Southern Bessarabia and, along with the agents from the local committees, made propaganda in favor of the plebiscite. Arms were brought from the Soviet Union and main deposits were in Strumok at Ivan Robotă's house and in Nerushai totaling 3,000 grenades, 1,000 guns, 7 machine guns, 500 swords, 2 cannons, and one mortar, all Russian made.

Andrei Klyushnikov or Nenin began to organize the local committees. From his house he wrote a report in which he asked for 100 swords, 600 guns, mine throwers, and bombs. Nenin encouraged the participants to be bold and to count on support of the Soviet Army once the rebellion starts. Nicolai Shishman was a very well trained agent. He spoke Russian, Romanian, and Bulgarian, as well as having other skills. Using many tactics, also by offering money, he tried to win local intellectuals and personalities to the Soviet cause, as was the case with senator Iacob Belaushenco from Cahul.

== Plan begins ==
=== Revolt starts ===
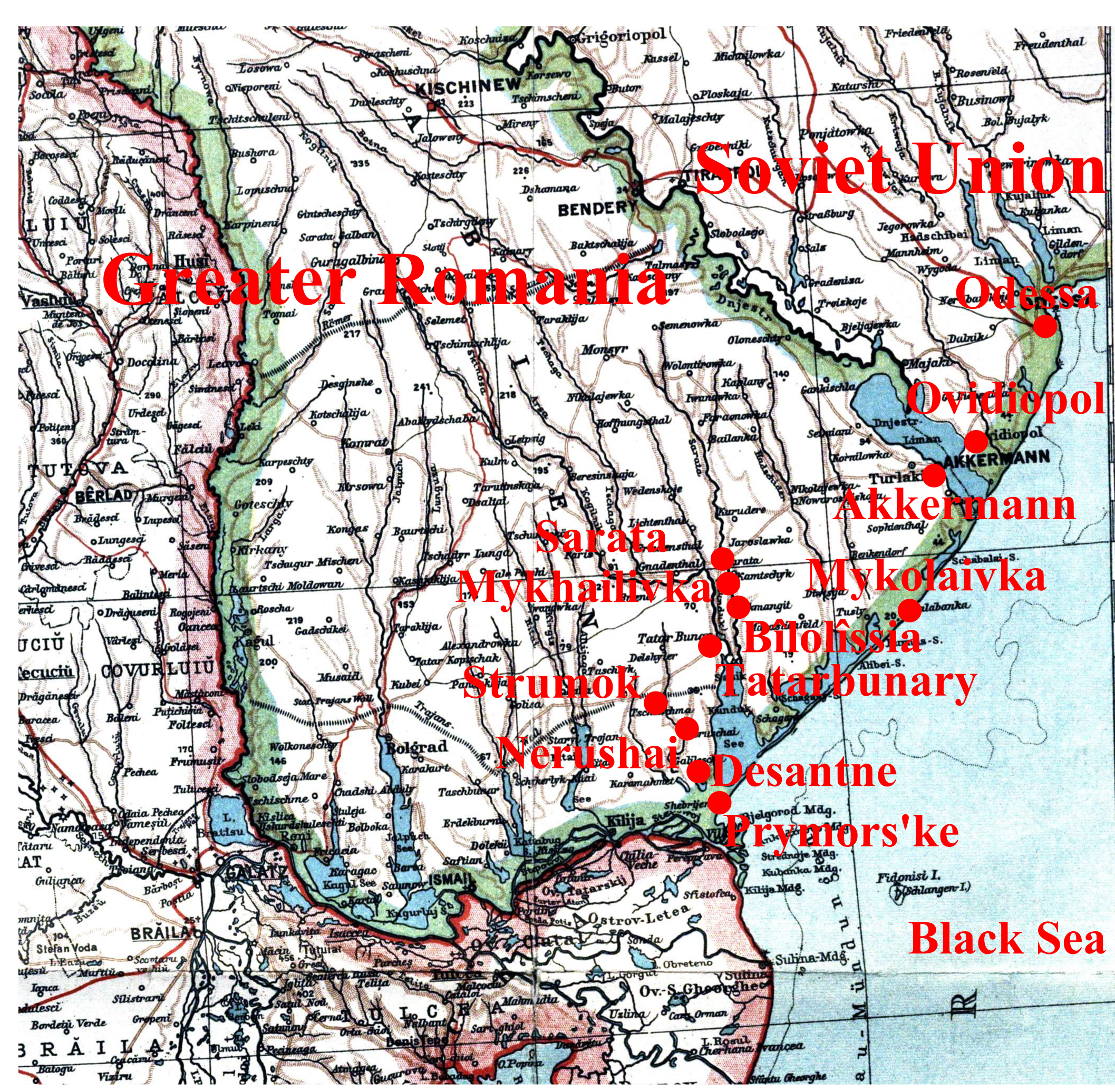
Budjak, southern Bessarabia. Locations of the rebellion are shown in red.

The first incident occurred at noon on September 11 when an armed group composed of 30 individuals, transported by boats, attacked the village of Nikolaievca (Romanian: Nicolăeni, now Mykolaivka) near the Soviet-Romanian border and at the shore of the Black Sea. The attack was initiated at the proposal of Kolţov and was led by Ivan Bejanovici. It appears that initial targets were Tuzly or Prymors'ke but no gendarmes were present at that time in Nikolaievca. The rebels cut the telephone and telegraph lines, killed the mayor and two gendarmes (last by grenade fire), set fire to several buildings, including the town hall, and spread manifests in which they encouraged the population to rebel. The manifests were signed by the infamous Romanian thief Terente. An outdoor fair was held in Nikolaievca and the attackers profited and looted the peasants, transporting the booty in three waggons to the nearby Black Sea marshes. The rapid intervention of the Romanian Gendarmerie prevented further turmoil.

After this incident, several leaders were arrested and it appears that Nenin decided to accelerate operations. On the evening of 15 September he convened a meeting at the house of Chirilă Nazarenko in Tatarbunary. Participants were Iustin Batischcev, Nechita Lisovoi, Kolţov, Leonte Ţurcan and Alexei Pavlenco. They all agreed on the plan, that would begin that night, and some of them brought arms and munitions from Strumok.

The revolt was resumed more strongly in Tatarbunary, during the night of September 15/16. Armed groups occupied the city hall and proclaimed the Moldavian Soviet Republic as part of the Ukraine SSR. The town secretary, the chief of the local gendarmerie, two Romanian Army soldiers as well as other Romanian state employees were killed during the attack. Nenin ordered Iustin Batishcev to send guards at all town's exits and to display red flags on public buildings. The population was gathered at the town hall were Nenin sad that Bessarabia was proclaimed a republic and that the Red Army crossed the Dniester to cast out the Romanian Army. He ended his speech by saying: "Long live the Soviet Republic of Moldavia". At the same time, a Soviet artillery detachment in Ovidiopol, on the left bank of the Dniester, had engaged in maneuvers.

During that night, out of Nenin's orders, two main groups were formed that took control of the villages near Tatarbunary–Strumok (Romanian: Cişmele) and Bîlolîssia (Romanian: Achmanghit) after which they went to Nerushai (Romanian: Neruşai), Mykhailivka (Romanian: Mihăileni) and Desantne (Romanian: Galileşti). The rebels formed Soviet-type institutions – revolution committees, militia units and the Red Guards. The total number of the rebels was 4000-6000 persons and they were mainly Ukrainians and Russians. The rebellion had little affinity with the Romanians, Bessarabian Bulgarians and Bessarabian Germans populations. The gendarmerie commander of Bîlolîssia escaped to Sarata (Romanian: Sărata) where he gathered a group of 40 German volunteers. In the morning of 16, the group opened fire upon the rebels led by Ivan Bejanovici. The fighting lasted for several hours until the rebels were informed that the Romanian Army was closing and retreated to Tatarbunary.

=== Romanian reaction ===
In order to suppress the rebellion, the Romanian government sent artillery troops of the Romanian Army Third Corps and a marine unit. The first units arrived from Cetatea Albă in the evening of 16 September and engaged the rebels at the bridge between Tatarbunary and Bîlolîssia, mortally injuring Ivan Bejanovici. Meanwhile, Nenin went to Strumok where he deposited arms and munition at Andrei Stantenco's house, one of the leaders of the rebellion. The Romanian Army coming from the west already engaged Strumok.

Nenin withdrew to Tatarbunary in the early hours of 17 September. Fighting continued around the village all day long until they retreated South to Nerushai where they would be supported by Leonte Ţurcan, who had a large stock of concealed weapons.

In the early hours of September 18, Romanian troops stormed Tatarbunary, the center of the rebellion, by shelling the village. Unable to hold his positions, Nenin ordered the withdrawal to Desantne. Then he tried to reach the Black Sea beach line at a place called Volcioc, near Prymors'ke (Romanian: Jibrieni), but the rebels were intercepted by a border patrol composed of 20 soldiers. The skirmish lasted until the rebels ran out of ammunition after which they were captured and disarmed. A larger army detachment caught the remaining groups, capturing 120 rebels.

Meanwhile, the leaders of the revolt, Nenin and Iustin Batischcev, fled by car which they later abandoned beyond Desantne. They hid in a corn field, but Batischcev left Nenin while he slept, taking with him 336,500 lei, representing the remaining money robbed from the people of Tatarbunary. He was later caught by the army. After waking up alone and found no money, Nenin ran towards the Black Sea marshes, but was surprised by a gendarme who mortally wounded him.

The Romanian Danube Fleet also took part in suppressing the rebellion as it was gathered at Mahmudia, near Kiliya, for military exercises. As southern Bessarabia was in danger the land troops asked for help and rear admiral Gavrilescu Anastasie moved the whole Danube fleet to Vylkove (Romanian: Vâlcov) capturing many rebels, including important quantities of arms, munitions, machine guns, explosive materials, grenades, bombs and railway mines near Periprava.

== Aftermath ==
The revolt was suppressed by the Romanian Army's Third Corps after three days of fighting in which 1,600 people were arrested and 3,000 died, among them, some of the leaders of the uprising – Andrei Kliushnikov, Ivan Bejanovici and Ivan Dobrovolski. Iustin Batishcev survived, but was arrested by the Romanian authorities. Nicolai Shishman managed to hide and on March 1, 1925, crossed the Dniestr into the Soviet Union. A month after the incidents started, on October 11, the gendarmes post in Cetatea Albă reported that an incident took place near the village of Tuzly were 45 armed man, arriving by motor boats, tried to free the participants of the uprising. Another similar incident took place 6 days later near Tatarbunary.

=== "Trial of the 500" ===
The trial took place from August 24 to December 2, 1925, at the Military Court of Third Army Corps. Most of the initial 1600 arrested were freed but 489 of them would be prosecuted, only 9 of them being Romanians. It was nicknamed by the press "Trial of the 500". Defense was ensured by 8 Romanian lawyers, including Iacob Pistiner and Constantin Costa-Foru who wrote about the arrested and criticized the Romanian authorities. Because the defendants did not speak Romanian the hearings were made with the help of translators so the trial lasted very long. The government's dossier presented at the trial contained about 70,000 pages and the verdict 180. All this and the unusual number of persons prosecuted made the trial last 103 days.

During the trial, Parfentie Voronovski, one of the participants, said that Nenin came from Moscow to organize the revolutionary committee and he, at Nenin's orders, would cut the telephone and telegraph line in Tatarbunary. Leonte Ţurcan, at the trial, informed that Nenin presented himself as a student coming from Russia to organize the committees. Nenin frequently asked about the state of the revolutionary committees and brought him two books – The Communist ABC and The Red Army. Ţurcan also said that after Nenin went to Odessa then to Moscow, upon his arrival in Bessarabia, informed the committees that the Red Army promised to intervene when the revolution starts. Another participant to the uprising, Dimitrie Sevcone, spoke about the meetings held by Nenin and Kolţov in which they talked about the connections between the committees and Grigory Kotovsky's army that also promised help.

On December 3, 1925, the War Council of Third Army Corps convicted 85 (none of them Romanians) out of 287 persons brought to trial. Iustin Batishcev was sentenced to life forced labor (eventually reduced to 16 years), the most severe penalty, Nichita Lisovoi and Leonte Ţurcan to 15 years forced labor, another three to 10 years and 20 others to 5 years in prison. The remaining received convictions of 1 to 3 years in prison. Also, each of the 85 convicts were to pay 1,000 lei representing legal charges.

=== Press reaction ===
The trial attracted Soviet propaganda and international attention, with Romain Rolland, Maxim Gorky, Paul Langevin, Theodore Dreiser, and Albert Einstein, among others, speaking out on behalf of the defendants, while Henri Barbusse even traveled to Romania to witness the proceedings.

In the national newspapers the subject was presented in two different forms, both being critic to the uprising, except for the communist press. The pro-liberal and pro-government view emphasizes the danger of communism spreading in the country and treated the uprising as a terrorist and bandit attack. Opposition newspapers heavily criticized the authorities for the disproportionate response to the uprising and also accused the liberal Ion Brătianu government of intentionally overstating the communist fear in order to extend the martial law to the whole country transforming it into a feudal state. The authorities admitted the disproportionate response, but it was too late and Romania became known internationally as a "minorities' prison".

Constantin Costa-Foru wrote several articles referring to the rebellion and claimed that it was not an uprising nor a Bolshevik armed incursion but a disaster that took its roots in the harsh, incompetent administration and said that all who fell into disgrace were considered Bolsheviks. French communist-militant Henri Barbusse attended the trial and wrote his famous book – Hangman (Romanian: Călăii) that caused serious international image problems for Romania. The book was published by the C.C. of M.O.P.R. in 1927, strengthening the anti-Romanian Soviet propaganda.

=== Different views ===
Authorities of the Kingdom of Romania saw the incident as a mere terrorist action backed by the Soviet Union, that tried to destabilise the situation inside the country and prepared for a Red Army incursion. The rebellion was also condemned by the country's non-communist socialist groups; the Socialist Federation's Ilie Moscovici wrote in 1925:

In Tatar Bunar, the Third International's agents provocateurs were involved, who, toying with the lives of Bessarabian peasants, wanted to prove to Europe that Bessarabians are in favour of the non-existent and ridiculous «Moldavian Republic».
A few peasants in a few isolated communes could not chase away the gendarmes [...] were it not for a few agents provocateurs assuring them that the revolution had begun throughout Bessarabia or that the red armies had entered or were about to enter.

The view was shared by the American scholar Charles Upson Clark, according to whom:

[...] the Tatar-Bunar rebellion was simply the most striking example of a Communist raid, engineered from without [...] and not a local revolution against intolerable conditions due to Roumanian oppression, as it was represented to be by the Socialist press everywhere.

Dutch professor Wim P. van Meurs, in his book dedicated to Bessarabia, considers the uprising as clearly instigated by communist agitators from across the Dniester and remarks that it was too well timed between the failure of the Vienna Conference and the proclamation of the Moldavian Autonomous Republic, moreover, for the Kremlin not to be involved.

Ukrainian and Russian authors consider that main factors contributing to the uprising were of social-economic nature – economic crisis in Romania, the agricultural policy in 1921, the drought and famine of 1923/1924 and harsh administration. Moldovan historian Ludmila Rotari claims that the Ukrainian and Russian populations, main participants, were on a greater social-economic scale compared to the Romanian population that was on the lowest scale and with the German and Bulgarian ones, comprising the richest populations. Also, during the uprising, the slogans used by the rebels were not of social but of political nature, like: Long live the Soviet Power!, Long live Soviet Bessarabia!, We ask for the unification with Soviet Ukraine!. Ever since unification Bessarabia has been under martial law, because of numerous Soviet subversive actions, with censorship and all other forms of interference with normal life and with Romanian Government officials that were overzealous or incompetent, both military and civil. Corruption also played an important part, sometimes even interfering with national security.

=== Long-term consequences ===
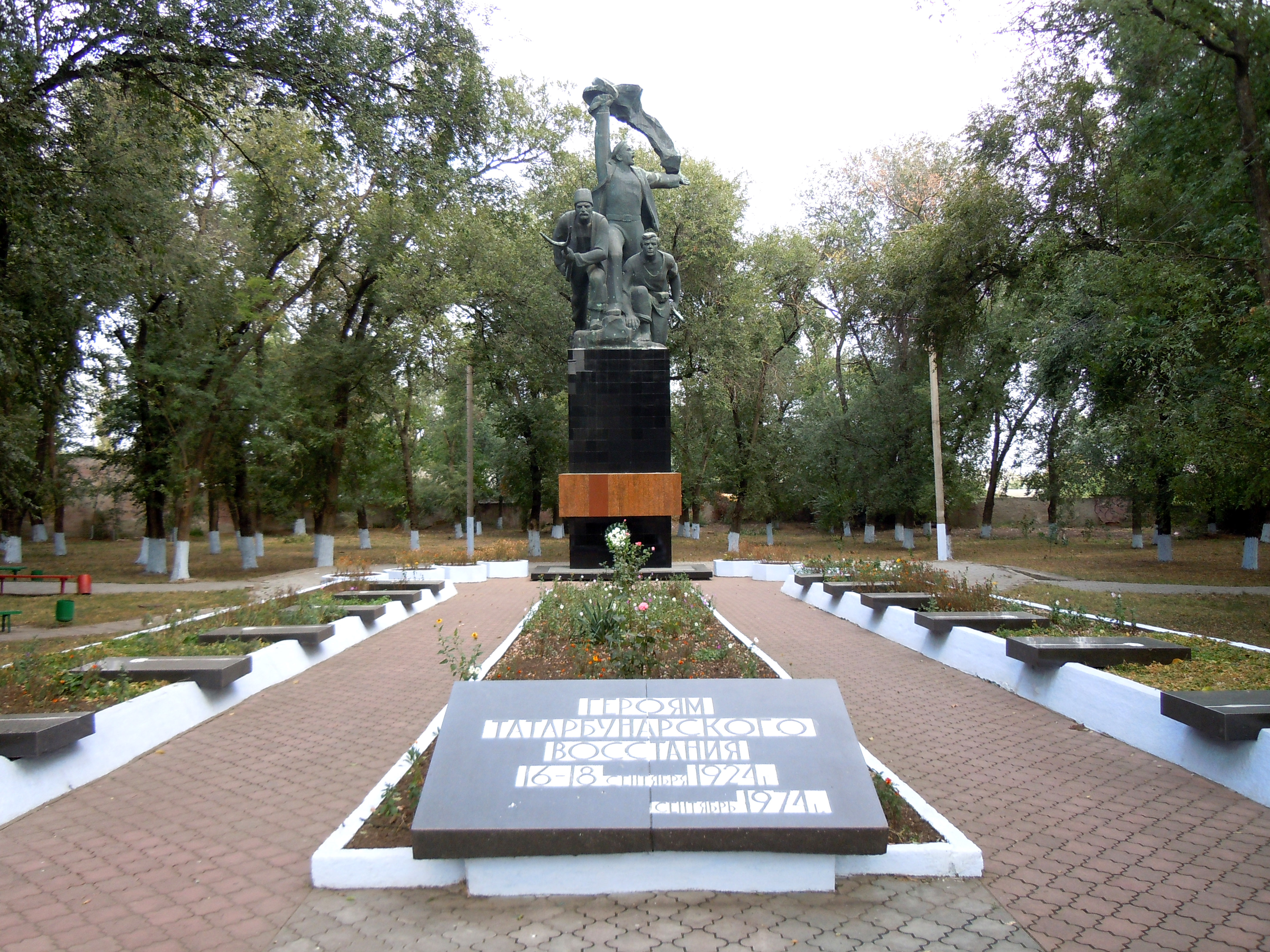
Tatarbunary uprising monument

Many participants of the uprising took refuge across the Dniestr in the village of Jura (Camenca raion), then part of the newly created Moldavian ASSR, and were very well treated but most of them suffered greatly during the Great Purge of 1937-1938.

Another event following the uprising was the de facto banning of the Romanian Communist Party by the third Mârzescu Law while the second had banned it de jure. The law was approved by the Parliament on 17 December and it came into force two days later thus leading to the arrests of almost all the communist party members, most of them being non-Romanians.
