= Klyuchnikov =

Klyuchnikov, feminine: Klyuchnikova, is a Russian occupational surname, a variant of Klyushnikov. Notable people with the surname include:

- Igor Klyuchnikov
- Marina Klyuchnikova
- Olga Klyuchnikova
- Svetlana Klyuchnikova
- Yuri Klyuchnikov (disambiguation), multiple persons

== See also ==
- Klyushnikov
