= Bile, Odesa Oblast =

Settlement in Odesa Oblast, Ukraine

Bile Біле
- Rural settlement
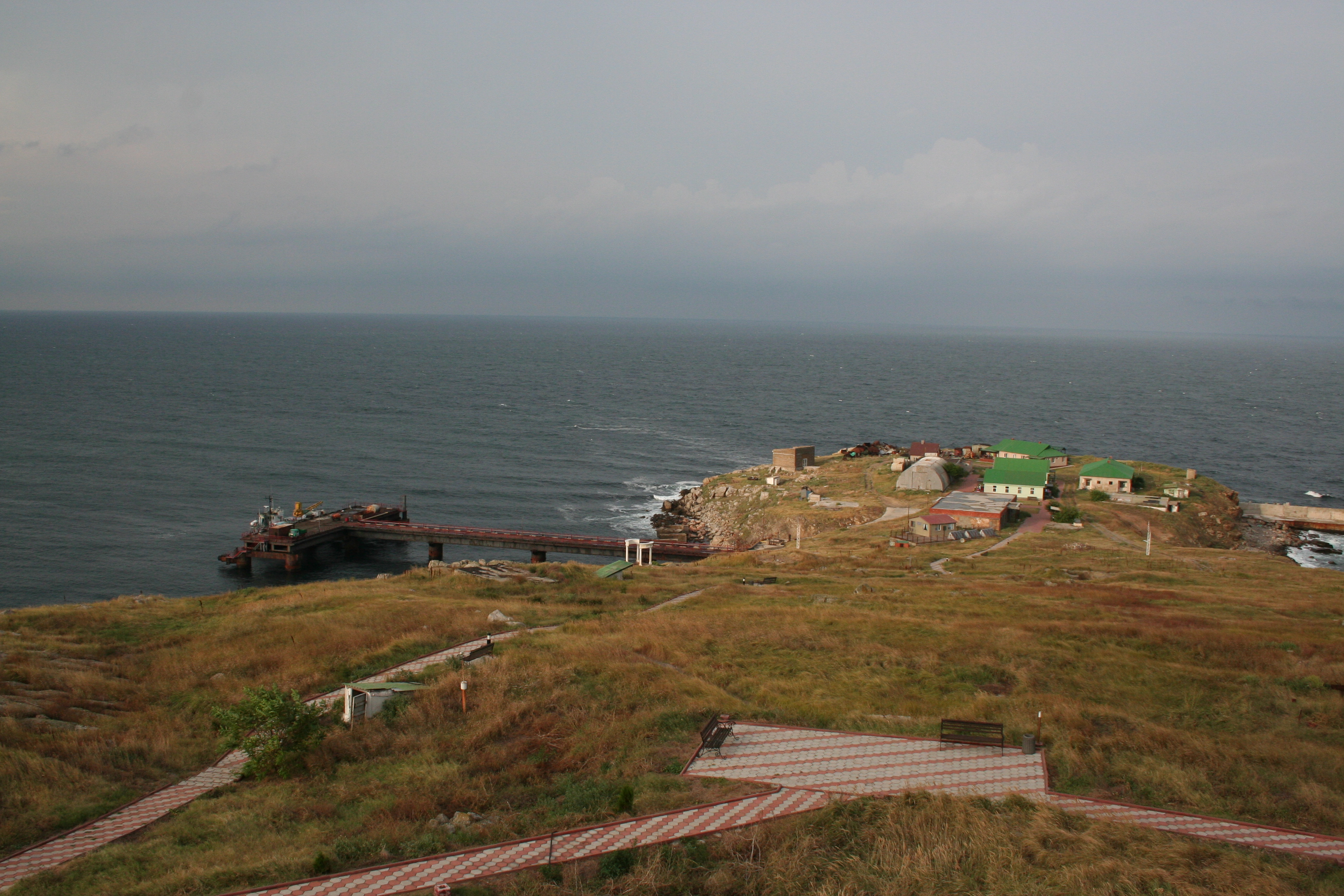
- Bile in 2014

- Location in Ukraine Bile (Ukraine)
- Coordinates: 45°15′18″N 30°12′15″E
- Country: Ukraine
- Oblast: Odesa Oblast
- Raion: Izmail Raion
- Hromada: Vylkove urban hromada
- Village founded: 2007
- Time zone: UTC+2 (EET)
  - Summer (DST): UTC+3 (EEST)
- Postal code: 68315

Bile (Ukrainian: Біле, lit. 'White') is the only settlement on Snake Island, in Izmail Raion in Odesa Oblast, southern Ukraine. It belongs to the Vylkove urban hromada, one of the hromadas (municipalities) of Ukraine.

== History ==
Bile was founded in 2007 on Snake Island to serve Ukraine in a then ongoing dispute with Romania regarding the territorial waters surrounding the island. This was criticized by Romania, which tried to prove that the village on Snake Island could not constitute a permanent settlement. The dispute ended in 2009 following mediation by the International Court of Justice (ICJ) which ruled that Romania would get 80% of the disputed maritime area. This was accepted by both sides.

Until 18 July 2020, Bile belonged to Kiliia Raion. This administrative unit was abolished in July 2020 as part of the administrative reform of Ukraine, which reduced the number of raions of Odesa Oblast to seven. The area of Kiliia Raion was merged into Izmail Raion.

The village of Bile only consists of a few houses of the Ukrainian soldiers stationed there, as well as a monument to 25 Russian sailors who died in 1905 during the Russo-Japanese War and a sign dedicated to Saint George, a Roman soldier and Christian saint.

=== Russian invasion of Ukraine ===
On 24 February 2022, during the Russian invasion of Ukraine, Snake Island was attacked and virtually all the infrastructure of the village was destroyed. Furthermore, the thirteen Ukrainian border guards defending the island were captured as prisoners of war by the Russian forces. On 30 June of the same year, Russian forces withdrew from Snake Island following a heavy Ukrainian bombardment campaign.
