= Ocnele Mari mine =

Salt mine in Romania

- Location within Romania
- Location: Ocnele Mari, Vâlcea County, Romania; 45°0′0″N 24°0′0″E
- Products: Sodium chloride
- Company: Salrom

The Ocnele Mari mine is a large salt mine located in southern Romania in Vâlcea County, close to Ocnele Mari. Ocnele Mari represents one of the largest salt reserves in the country, having estimated reserves of 9 billion tonnes of sodium chloride.

== See also ==
- Ocnele Mari prison
