= Ocnele Mari =

- Town
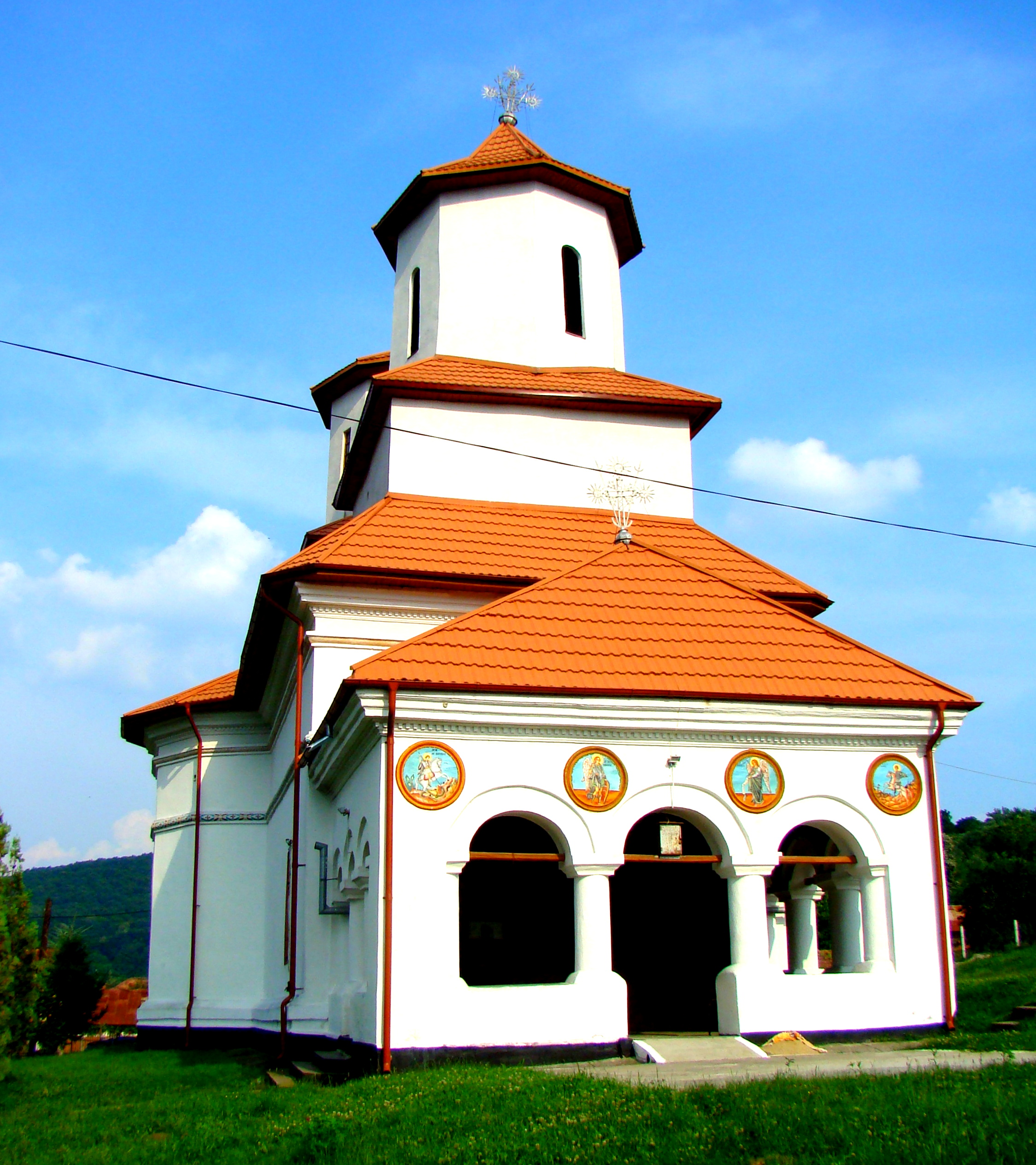
- Saint George's Church, Ocnele Mari

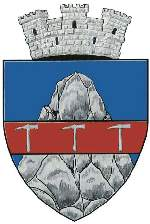
- Coat of arms

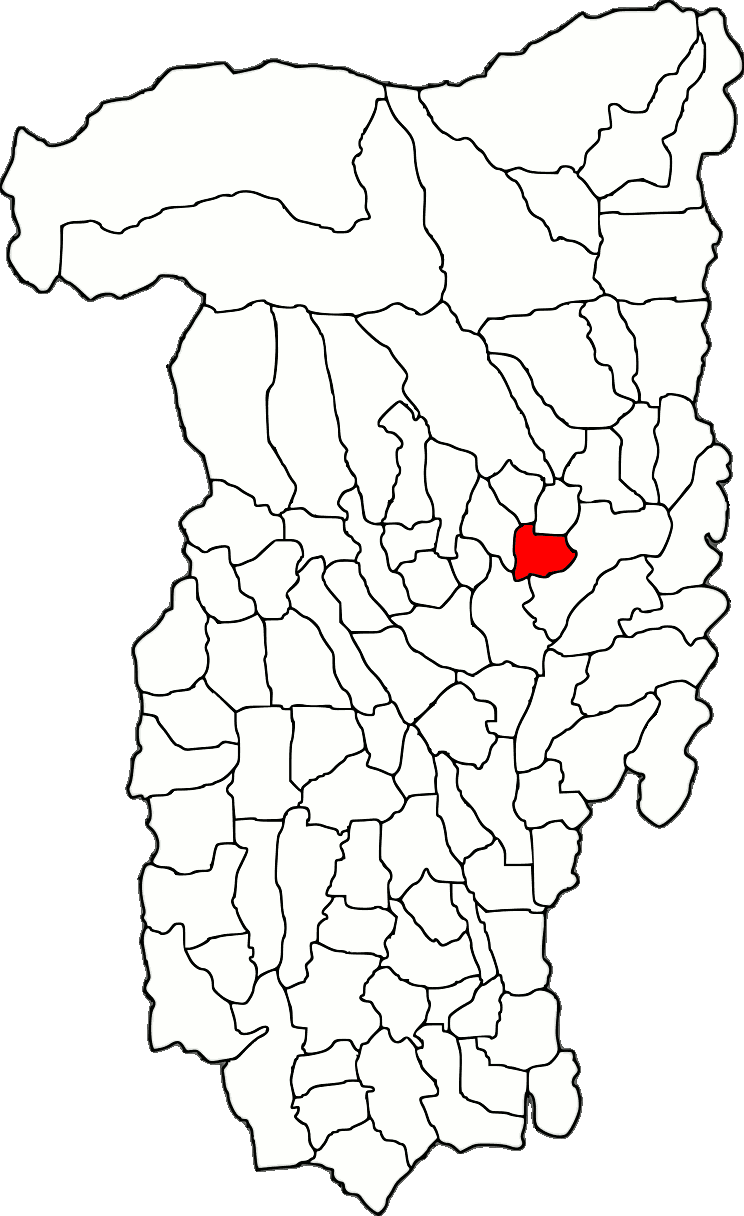
- Location in Vâlcea County

- Location in Romania
- Coordinates: 45°05′17″N 24°17′53″E
- Country: Romania
- County: Vâlcea

Government
  - Mayor (2024–2028): Remus-Gabriel Sasu (PSD)
- Area: 25.05 km^{2} (9.67 sq mi)
- Elevation: 260 m (850 ft)
- Population (2021-12-01): 3,134
  - Density: 125.1/km^{2} (324.0/sq mi)
- Time zone: UTC+02:00 (EET)
  - Summer (DST): UTC+03:00 (EEST)
- Postal code: 245900
- Area code: (+40) 02 50
- Vehicle reg.: VL
- Website: www.ocne.ro

Historical population
Year	Pop.	±%
1912	5,120	—
1930	7,223	+41.1%
1948	6,159	−14.7%
1956	4,420	−28.2%
1966	3,651	−17.4%
1977	3,883	+6.4%
1992	3,617	−6.9%
2002	3,591	−0.7%
2011	3,080	−14.2%
2021	3,134	+1.8%
Source: Census data

Ocnele Mari is a town located in Vâlcea County, Oltenia, Romania. The town administers eight villages: Buda, Cosota, Făcăi, Gura Suhașului, Lunca, Ocnița, Slătioarele, and Țeica.

The town is situated in the central part of the county, at a distance of 12 km (7.5 mi) from the county seat, Râmnicu Vâlcea, which it borders to the east and south. Ocnele Mari also borders several communes: Mihăești to the south, Bunești to the west, and Păușești-Măglași and Vlădești to the north.

The greatest extent of the solar eclipse of August 11, 1999 was near Ocnele Mari.

== Geography ==
Ocnele Mari is located in the southern foothills of the Southern Carpathians. The county seat, Râmnicu Vâlcea, is located about 6 km (3.7 mi) to the northeast. The area around the city contains the largest salt deposits in Wallachia.

== Demographics ==
In 1930, about 7,200 people lived in the area of present-day Ocnele Mari. According to the 2002 census, Ocnele Mari had a population of 3,563, including 3,531 Romanians, 20 Roma, 8 Hungarians, and 2 Romanians of German descent. At the 2021 census, the town had a population of 3,134, of which 92.12% were Romanians.

== Notable people ==
- Mircea Demetriade (1861–1914), poet, playwright, and actor
- Ioan Luchian Mihalea (1951–1993), composer, conductor, and television producer

== See also ==
- Ocnele Mari mine
- Ocnele Mari Prison
