= Prymorske, Izmail Raion, Odesa Oblast =

Rural locality in Odesa Oblast, Ukraine

Prymorske Приморське
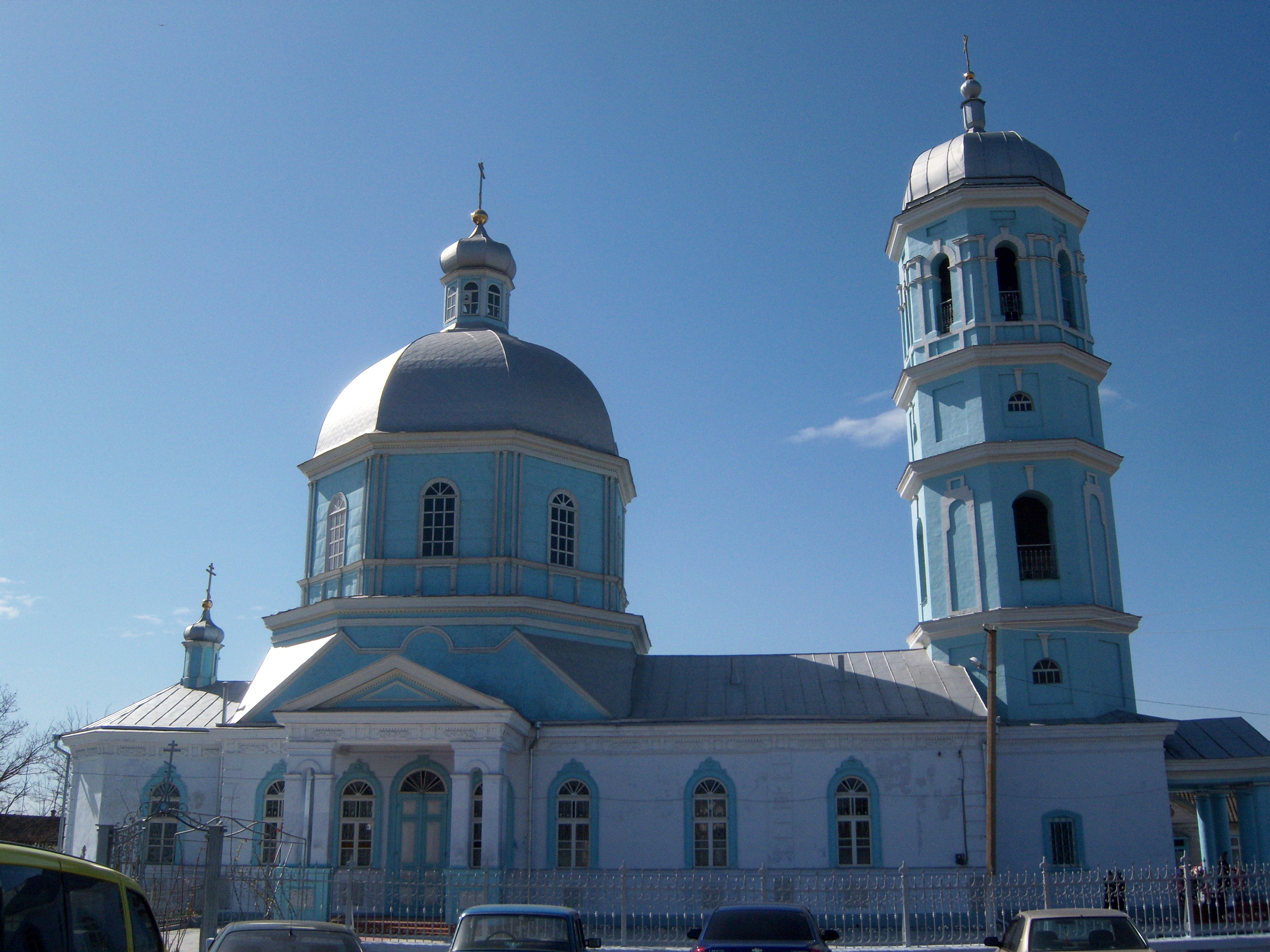
- The village's Lipovan church, est. 1905

- Location in Ukraine Prymorske (Ukraine)
- Coordinates: 45°31′15″N 29°36′20″E
- Country: Ukraine
- Oblast: Odesa Oblast
- Raion: Izmail Raion
- Hromada: Vylkove urban hromada
- Village founded: 1720s (Zhebriyany); 1945 (Prymorskoe)

Area
  - Total: 1.95 km^{2} (0.75 sq mi)
- Elevation: 2 m (6.6 ft)

Population (2004)
  - Total: 1,612
  - Estimate (01.01.2026): 1,551
  - Density: 971.79/km^{2} (2,516.9/sq mi)
- Time zone: UTC+2 (EET)
  - Summer (DST): UTC+3 (EEST)
- Postal code: 68353
- Area code: +380 4843
- Website: http://primorskoe.com/

Prymorske or Primorskoye (Ukrainian: Приморське; Russian: Приморское; Romanian: Jibrieni) is a small seaside village in Izmail Raion, Odesa Oblast, Ukraine. It belongs to Vylkove urban hromada, one of the hromadas of Ukraine.

== Geography ==
Prymorske is a village located in south-western Ukraine. The distance from the city of Kiliia, is 12 km. The distance from the oblast center, the city of Odesa is about 208 km by road, and the distance from the capital, Kyiv is roughly 657 km.

Prymorske is located both in the Danube Delta and on the Black Sea. It is situated in the historic Bessarabian district of Budjak.

The area has a smooth topography. Prymorske has several large accumulation reservoirs, and Danube and Black Sea basins within a 30 km radius. The territory encompasses 6.37 km² (together with agricultural land - 98.68 km ²)

== Demographics ==
According to the 2001 census, of the 1612 residents in Prymorske, the ethnic make up is as followers: 59 are Ukrainian, 986 are Russian, 14 are Moldavian, 9 are Bulgarian and 4 are Georgian. 74 of them are considered low-income individuals.

== History ==
=== Early history ===
The village was founded in the beginning of the 18th century, by the Lipovans (Russian Old Believers) who fled persecution in the Russian Empire. During this time, the Budjak was under control of the Turks. The Turks traditionally accepted refugees in their lands, and patronized the population of these lands. The area was originally called Zhebriyany. After the annexation of Bessarabia and Budjak to the Russian Empire, Zhebriyany became a border village, and after the dissolution of the Zaporizhian Sich, many Cossacks moved to the Danube Delta, creating Danube Sich, and from there they absorbed the village. In 1905 the village's first Lipovan church was founded, becoming a local attraction.

During the Russian Civil War, Southern Bessarabia, together with the rest of the province and with it the village, united with Romania. In 1940, following an ultimatum from the Soviet Union, the territory was occupied by the Red Army and became a part of the Ukrainian SSR.

=== World War II ===
During World War II, Soviet troops lost control of the village, and fell back to Odesa. The village was once again occupied by Romania.

In March and August 1944 during the Uman-Botoşani and Jassy-Kishinev Offensives, the soldiers of the 2nd and 3rd Ukrainian Front landed marines 2 km from the village. The Romanian troops eventually retreated, and the Soviet troops retook control of the village.

After the war, the village, like many other seaside towns in Ukraine, the village changed its name to Prymorske, which translates to "Seaside". As it stands, there are currently several other villages in Ukraine by the name of "Prymorske".

Until 18 July 2020, Prymorske belonged to Kiliia Raion. The raion was abolished in July 2020 as part of the administrative reform of Ukraine, which reduced the number of raions of Odesa Oblast to seven. The area of Kiliia Raion was merged into Izmail Raion.

== Climate ==
The climate in Prymorske is moderate continental with short and mild winters with frequent thaws, and warm, sometimes hot long summer, with little humidity. Winter lasts from mid-November to late March (4.5 months), the average temperature is +0.8 °C. The coldest month of the year is January, and its average temperature is -0.5 °C, not below the freezing -22.8 °C. Summer lasts from mid-May to late September (4.5 months), the average temperature is +20.8 °C. July is the hottest month, with the average temperature being +21.7 °C, with a high of +37.8 °C.

Prymorske Climate
Temperature
Month	Jan	Feb	Mar	Apr	May	Jun	Jul	Aug	Sep	Oct	Nov	Dec	Total
Absolute high, °C	16,1	21,1	26,1	27,8	31,1	37,8	37,2	36,1	33,9	31,1	25,0	18,9	37,8
Average high, °C	2,8	3.3	8,3	15,0	21,1	25,0	26,7	26,7	22,8	16,1	8,3	3,9	15,0
Average temperature, °C	−0,5	0	4,4	10,6	16,1	20,0	21,7	21,1	17,2	11,7	5,0	1,1	11,1
Absolute low, °C	−3,9	−3,3	0,5	6,1	11,1	15,0	16,1	15,6	11,7	6,7	1,1	−1,7	6,1
Absolute minimum, °C	−20,0	−22,8	−18,3	−2,2	0	6,7	10,0	4,4	−2,2	−7,8	−16,1	−16,2	−22,8
Prymorske Rainfall
Months	Jan	Feb	Mar	Apr	May	Jun	Jul	Aug	Sep	Oct	Nov	Dec	Total
Annual rainfall, мм	20	30	40	40	50	80	60	50	30	30	40	40	580

During the year rainfall is on average 400 – 600 mm. The rainy season is June, July and November, during which monthly rainfall is about 60 – 80 mm. The driest months are January and February, with 20 – 30 mm of rainfall. Fog and dew are uncommon, but often appears in the cold half of the year, while the dew occurs mainly in the summer.

== Economy ==
The economy of Prymorske relies primarily on agriculture and seasonal tourism. The village features a 2 km seaside area of land featuring numerous restaurants, discos, bars, and hotels

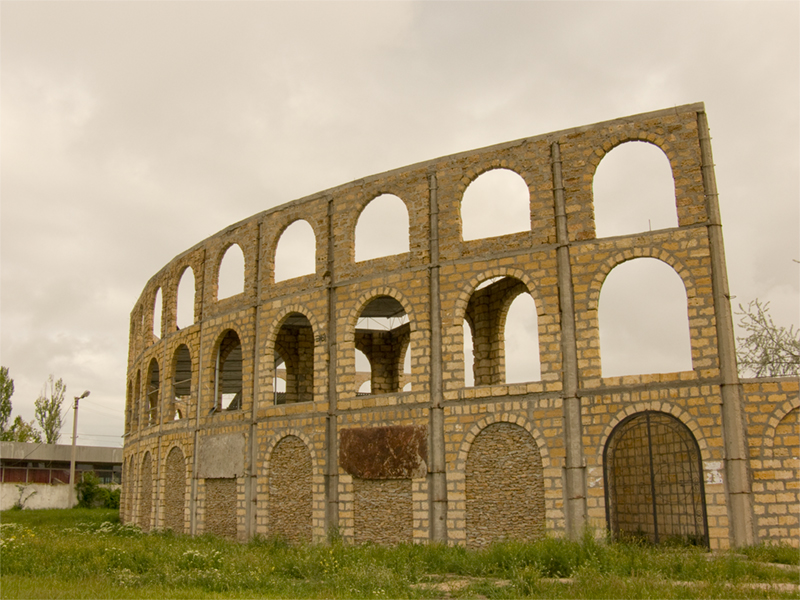
Coliseum disco at the seaside, in Prymorske

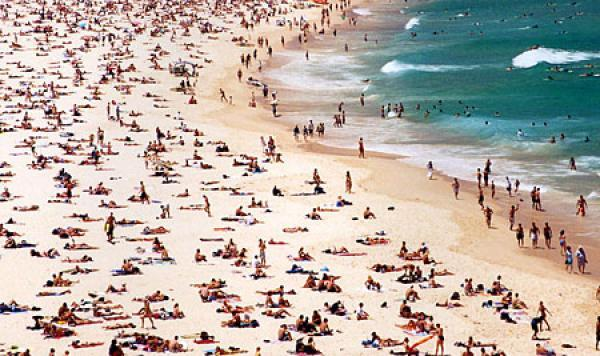
The beach, with numerous sunbathers

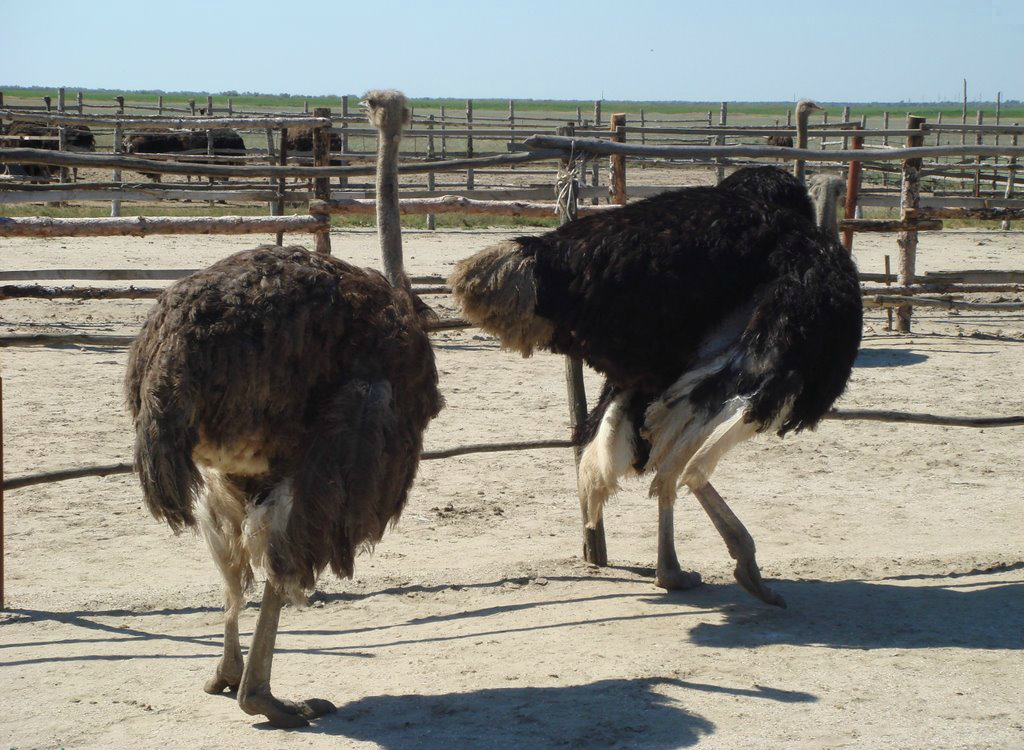
An ostrich farm in Prymorske
