= Andrey Klyushnikov =

Soviet Bolshevik

Andrey Ivanovich Klyushnikov, whose real name was Vasily Surov (commonly known as Nenin or Ninin; 1892-1924), was a Soviet Bolshevik who took an important role in the Tatarbunary Uprising.

Born in the village of Kuki (Sapozhkovsky Uyezd, Ryazan Governorate, part of the then Russian Empire), he moved to Petrograd and worked at the Putilov plant. After some time he obtained qualification as a military medical assistant. During the First World War he provided medical care on the Romanian Front. After the War he got involved in the Bolshevik movement and on September 15, 1924, he led a military uprising in and around the town of Tatarbunary proclaiming the Moldavian Soviet Republic as part of the Ukraine SSR but eventually died during fighting with the Romanian Army.
