= Vylkove =

City in Odesa Oblast, Ukraine

Vylkove Вилкове
- City
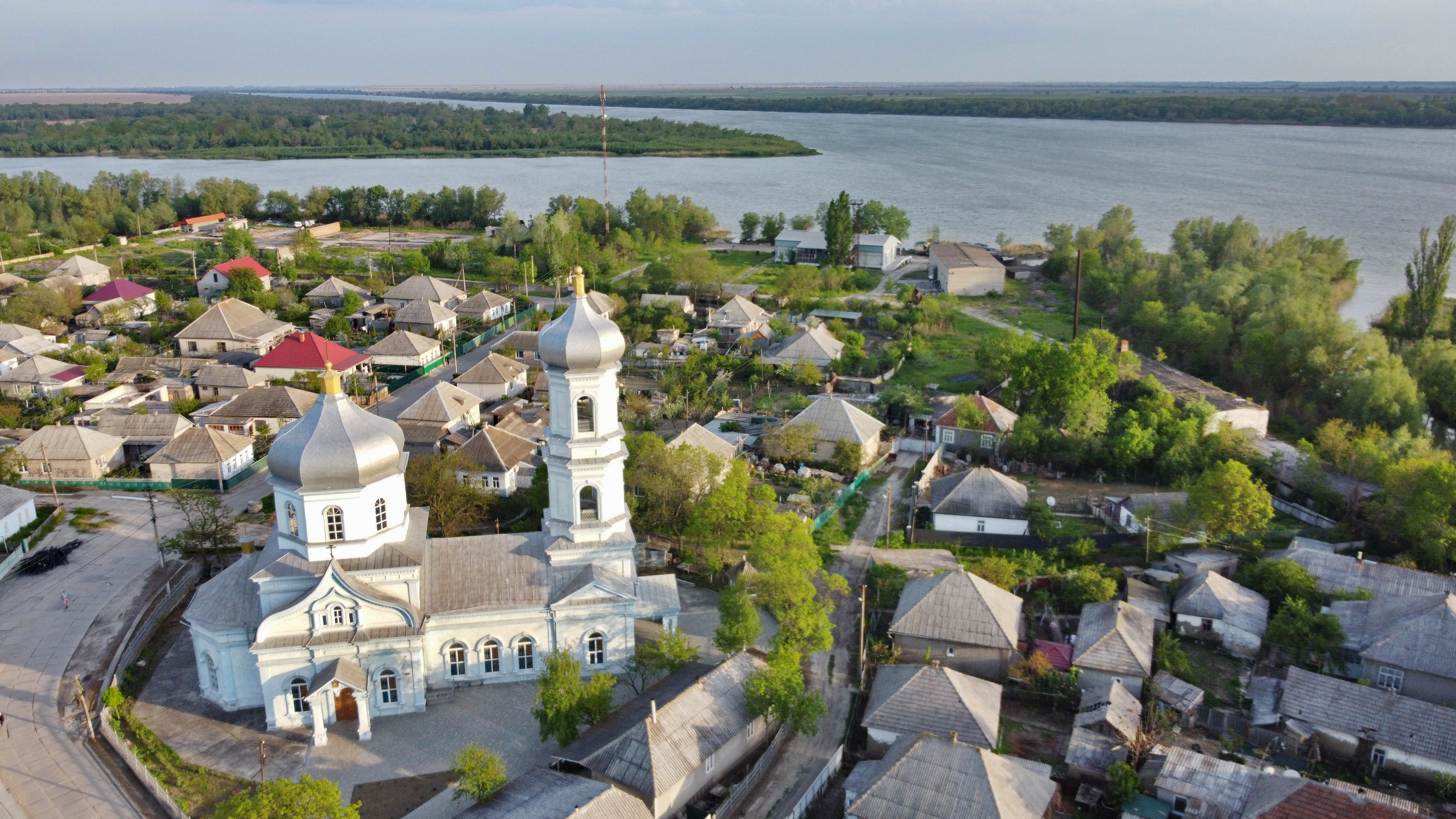
- View of Vylkove

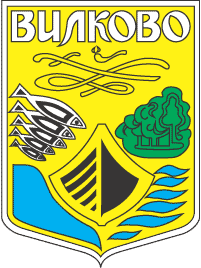
- Coat of arms
- Interactive map of Vylkove
- Location of Vylkove Vylkove (Ukraine)
- Coordinates: 45°23′57″N 29°35′37″E
- Country: Ukraine
- Oblast: Odesa Oblast
- Raion: Izmail Raion
- Hromada: Vylkove urban hromada
- Founded: 1746
- City rights: 1762

Area
  - Total: 4.6 km^{2} (1.8 sq mi)
- Elevation: 0 m (0 ft)

Population (2022)
  - Total: 7,712
  - Density: 1,700/km^{2} (4,300/sq mi)
- Postal code: 68355
- Area code: +380 4843

Vylkove (Ukrainian: Вилкове, pronounced [ˈwɪlkowe]; Russian: Вилково, romanized: Vilkovo; Romanian: Vâlcov) is a small city located in the Ukrainian part of the Danube Delta, at the utmost southwest of Ukraine, on the border with Romania. Administratively, it is part of Izmail Raion (district) of Odesa Oblast (region). Vylkove hosts the administration of Vylkove urban hromada, one of the hromadas of Ukraine. Population: 7,712 (2022 estimate).

== Geography ==
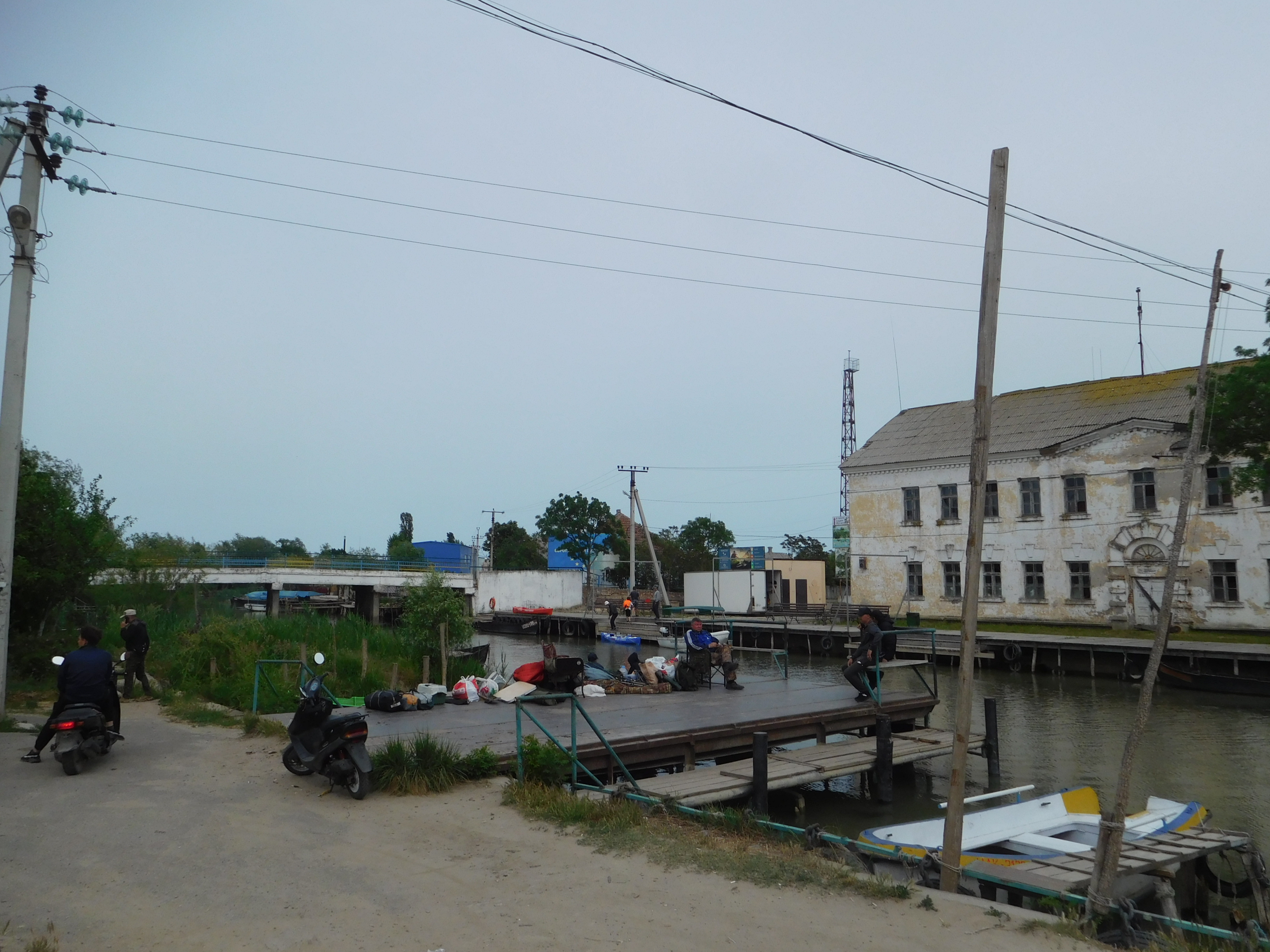
Bilohorodskyi Canal — the main canal in Vylkove

Vylkove is located inside the Danube Delta marshlands, which makes grain growing almost impossible, thus making fishery in the Danube, delta lakes and in the Black Sea the main occupation of the local people. In addition, the city is famous for its viticulture and cultivation of strawberries on the islands in the river delta. Due to a number of channels excavated inside its territory, get town is also known as "Ukraine's Venice". Boats are the most common method of transportation.

The administration of the Ukrainian Danube Biosphere Reserve is based in Vylkove. The territory of the Reserve includes the islands upstream and downstream the Danube, reedbeds to north from Danube, delta water bodies and adjacent area of the sea (2 km or 1.2 mi from the coast).

== History ==
Vylkove was founded in 1746 and was assigned the status of "town" in 1762.

Until 18 July 2020, Vylkove belonged to Kiliia Raion. The raion was abolished in July 2020 as part of the administrative reform of Ukraine, which reduced the number of raions of Odesa Oblast to seven. The area of Kiliia Raion was merged into Izmail Raion.

== Demographics ==
The population is about 9,300, according to the 2001 Ukrainian census. About 70% of the population consists of Lipovans, about 25% are Ukrainians, and the remainder are Romanians, Gagauz (Turkic-speaking followers of the Russian Orthodox Church), and Bulgarians. The main confession is Christian Old Believers (Lipovans) (about 70%, mainly Russians), the rest are the members of the Ukrainian Orthodox Church. There are three churches in Vylkove: two belong to Old Believers and one to Ukrainian Orthodox Church. In 2001, the city of Vylkove was 83.46% Russian-speaking, 15.34% Ukrainian-speaking and 0.54% Moldovan-speaking (Romanian-speaking). (The Ukrainian government classifies the Moldovan language as Romanian.) Among the 9,426 inhabitants, there were 2,496 Ukrainians (26.48%), 6,597 Russians (69.99%), 831 Bulgarians (8.82%), and 120 Moldovans (1.27%).
