= Desantne =

Rural locality in Odesa Oblast, Ukraine

Desantne Десантне Galilești
- Location within Odesa Oblast Location within Ukraine
- Coordinates: 45°31′N 29°36′E
- Country: Ukraine
- Oblast: Odesa Oblast
- Raion: Izmail Raion
- Hromada: Vylkove urban hromada

Area
  - Total: 3.3 km^{2} (1.3 sq mi)

Population (2020)
  - Total: 1,816
  - Density: 550/km^{2} (1,400/sq mi)
- Time zone: UTC+2 (EET)
  - Summer (DST): UTC+3 (EEST)
- Postal code: 68341
- Area code: +380 4843

Desantne (Ukrainian: Десантне; Romanian: Galilești) is a village in Izmail Raion, Odesa Oblast, Ukraine. It belongs to Vylkove urban hromada, one of the hromadas of Ukraine. Population: 1816

Until 18 July 2020, Desantne belonged to Kiliia Raion. The raion was abolished in July 2020 as part of the administrative reform of Ukraine, which reduced the number of raions of Odesa Oblast to seven. The area of Kiliia Raion was merged into Izmail Raion.
