= Lacul cu Nămol =

Natural salt lake in Ocna Sibiului, Romania

- Balta cu Nămol
- Location within Romania
- Location: Ocna Sibiului, Sibiu County, Transylvania, Romania
- Coordinates: 45°52′27″N 24°03′53″E
- Type: Salt lake

Lacul cu Nămol, also called (Lacul) Balta cu Nămol, is a natural salt lake in the town of Ocna Sibiului, Sibiu County, Transylvania, Romania. It is one of the many lakes of the Ocna Sibiului mine, a large salt mine which has one of the largest salt reserves in Romania.

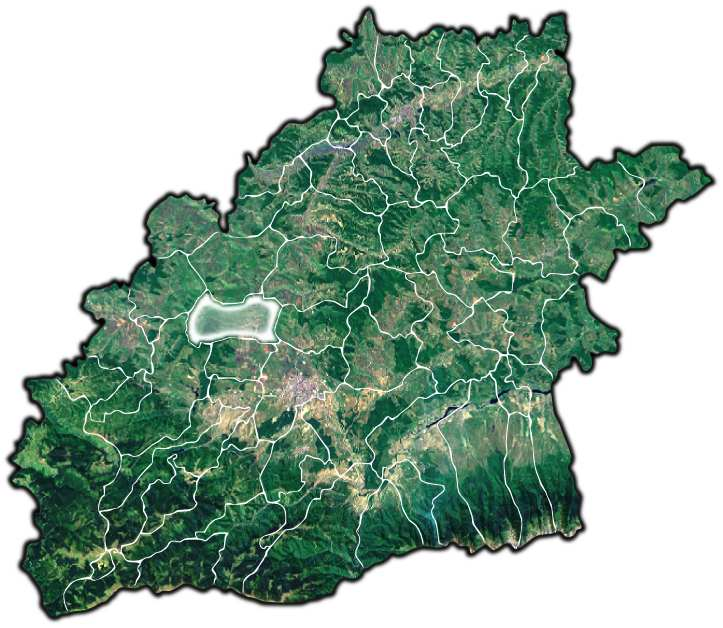
Ocna Sibiului within the Sibiu County

== Name ==
In Romanian, Lacul cu Nămol means the Lake with Mud . The other name of the lake, Balta cu Nămol, means the Pond with Mud.

== History ==
The lake formed in a depression created by salt excavation.

== Information ==
Lacul cu Nămol and Lacul Negru are the only lakes of the mine to have mud. Something else they have in common is that their depth is very small, probably reaching 1–2 m.

== Lakes of the salt mine ==
- Auster
- Lake Avram Iancu-Ocniţa
- Balta cu Nămol
- Brâncoveanu
- Cloşca
- Crişan
- Lacul Fără Fund
- Gura Minei
- Horea
- Mâţelor
- Negru
- Pânzelor
- Rândunica
- Verde (Freshwater lake)
- Vrăjitoarelor (Freshwater lake)
