= Lacul Fără Fund (Ocna Sibiului) =

- Lacul Lemnelor
- Location within Romania
- Location: Ocna Sibiului, Sibiu County, Transylvania, Romania
- Coordinates: 45°52′34″N 24°04′03″E
- Type: Salt lake
- Surface area: 1,665 m^{2} (17,920 sq ft)
- Max. depth: 32 m (105 ft)

Lacul Fără Fund (also called Lacul Lemnelor) is a natural salt lake in the town of Ocna Sibiului, Sibiu County, Transylvania, Romania. It is one of the many lakes of the Ocna Sibiului mine, a large salt mine which has one of the largest salt reserves in Romania.

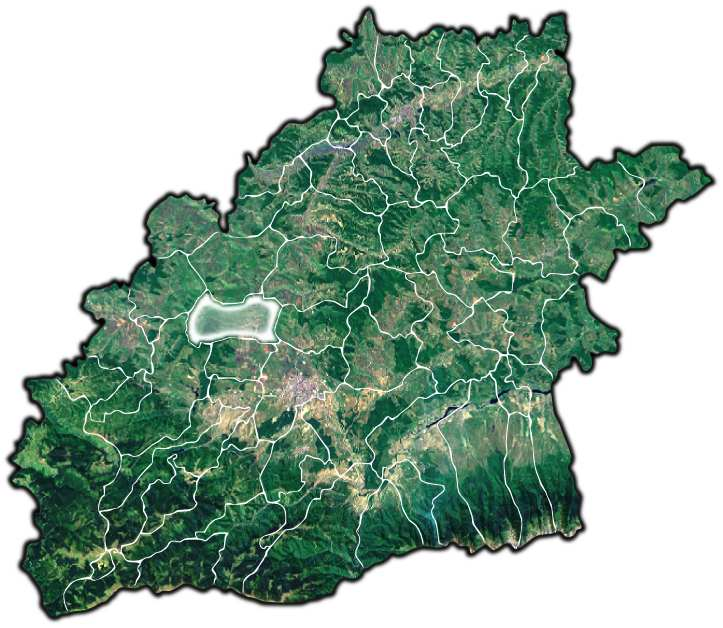
Ocna Sibiului within the Sibiu County

== Name ==
In Romanian, Lacul Fără Fund means The Bottomless Lake, which is an obvious reference to its high depth. The other name, Lacul Lemnelor means Lake of the wood.

== History ==
The lake was formed on the site of the Francisc Grube salt mine, which was abandoned in 1775 due to water infiltrations.

== Information ==
- Surface: 1,665 square metres (17,920 sq ft)
- Maximum depth: 32 metres (105 ft)
- Salinity: 96 g/L (at the surface), 318 g/L (at 6 m depth)

== Lakes of the salt mine ==
- Auster
- Lake Avram Iancu-Ocniţa
- Balta cu Nămol
- Brâncoveanu
- Cloşca
- Crişan
- Lacul Fără Fund
- Gura Minei
- Horea
- Mâţelor
- Negru
- Pânzelor
- Rândunica
- Verde (Freshwater lake)
- Vrăjitoarelor (Freshwater lake)
