= Lake Avram Iancu-Ocnița =

- Lacul Avram Iancu-Ocnița (Romanian)
- Location within Romania
- Location: Ocna Sibiului, Sibiu County, Transylvania, Romania
- Coordinates: 45°52′29″N 24°04′00″E
- Type: Salt lake
- Surface area: 10,143 m^{2} (109,180 sq ft)
- Max. depth: 160 m (520 ft)
- Salinity: 170-260 g/l

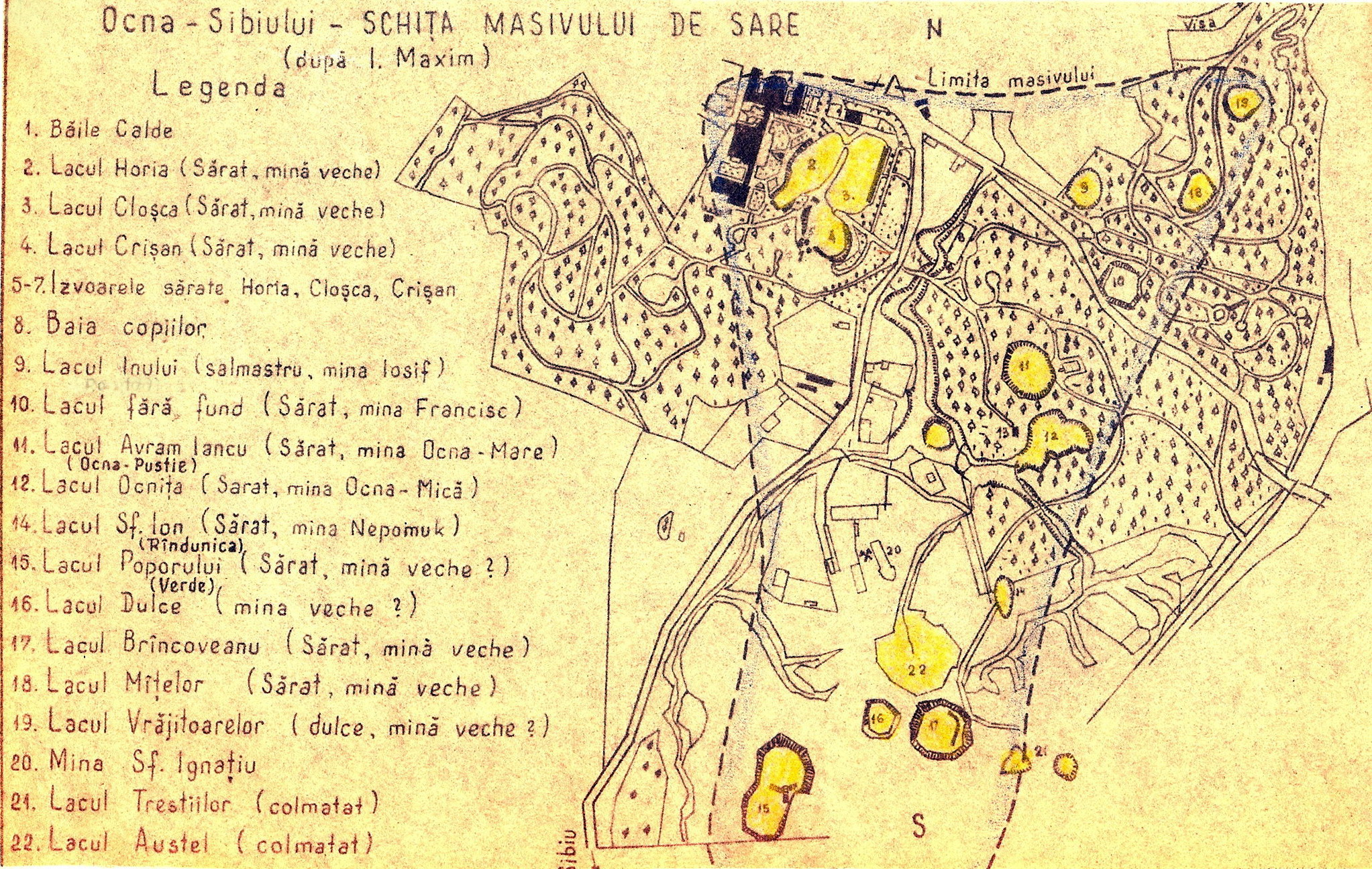
1930 map of the salt mine. The two lakes (11 and 12) were still split from each other.

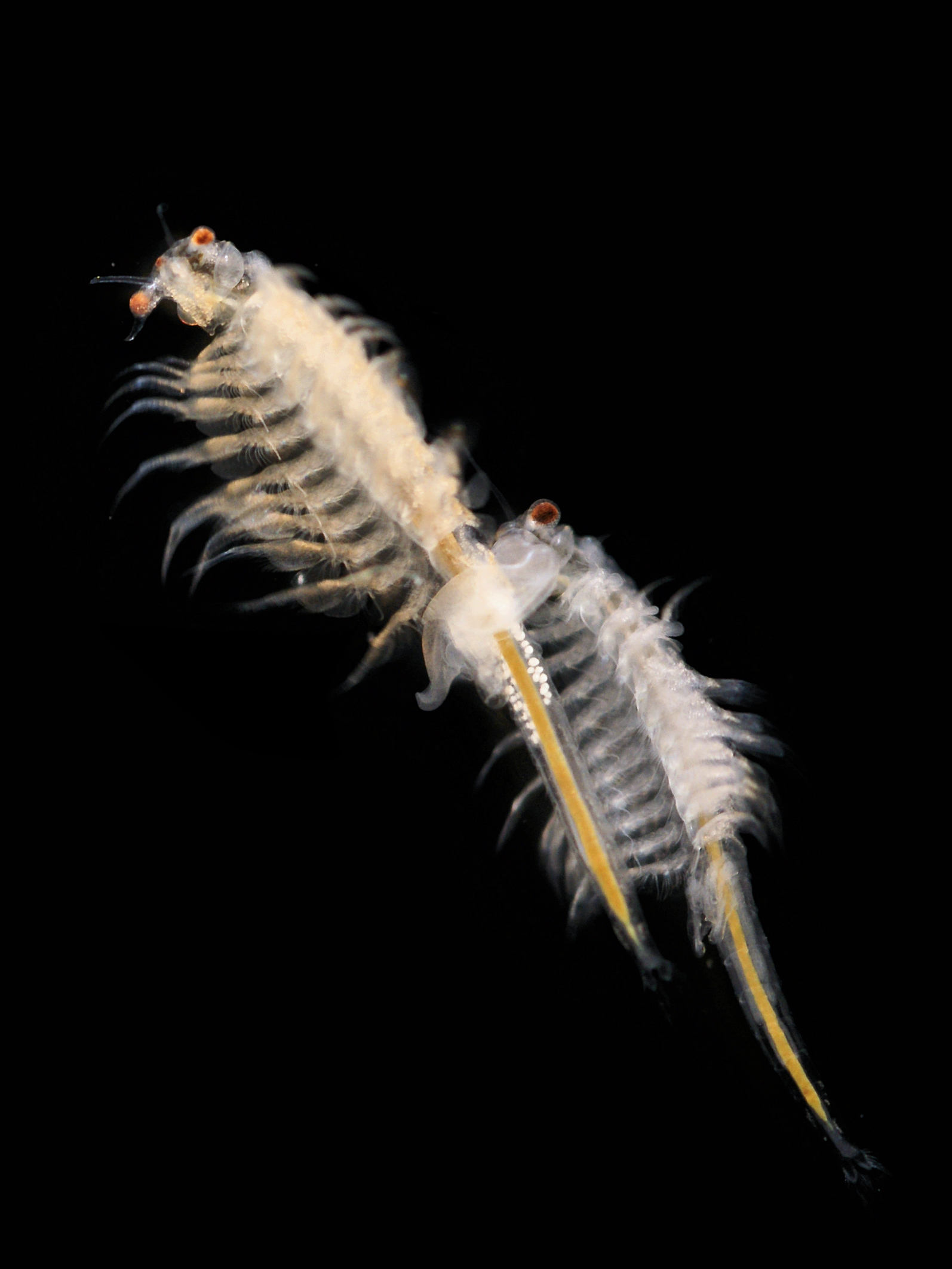
Artemia salina

Lake Avram Iancu-Ocnița (Romanian: Lacul Avram Iancu-Ocnița) is a natural salt lake in the town of Ocna Sibiului, Sibiu County, Transylvania, Romania. It is one of the many lakes of the Ocna Sibiului mine, a large salt mine which has one of the largest salt reserves in Romania. The lake is the result of the lakes Avram Iancu and Ocnița merging into a single lake.

== Name ==
The old Avram Iancu Lake is named after Avram Iancu, a Transylvanian Romanian lawyer who played an important role in the local chapter of the Austrian Empire Revolutions of 1848–1849. The lake was also called Ocna Pustie (meaning the bare mine)

The name of the other lake, Ocnița, means small mine, after the Romanian word ocnă, meaning (salt) mine. It was named so because of the salt mine that created it, which was smaller than the mine of its neighbor lake, Avram Iancu.

== History ==
Lake Avram Iancu (Ocna Pustie) was formed on the "Fodina Maior" ("Grosse Grube") saline, exploited in a bell system through two wells up to a depth of 160 m.

Lake Ocnița was formed on the basis of the "Fodina Minor" ("Kleine Grube"), exploited in a bell system up to a depth of 136 m, through two wells, and abandoned in 1817 due to water infiltration.

== Information ==
- Surface: 10,143 square metres (109,180 sq ft) (combined surface of the two old lakes)
- Maximum depth: 160 metres (520 ft)
- Salinity: 170-260 g/l
- Fauna: Artemia salina

== Lakes of the salt mine ==
- Auster
- Lake Avram Iancu-Ocniţa
- Balta cu Nămol
- Brâncoveanu
- Cloşca
- Crişan
- Lacul Fără Fund
- Gura Minei
- Horea
- Mâţelor
- Negru
- Pânzelor
- Rândunica
- Verde (Freshwater lake)
- Vrăjitoarelor (Freshwater lake)
