= Lake Rândunica =

- Lacul Sf. Ioan
- Lacul Rândunica (Romanian)
- Location within Romania
- Location: Ocna Sibiului, Sibiu County, Transylvania, Romania
- Coordinates: 45°52′23″N 24°03′59″E
- Type: Salt lake
- Surface area: 2,149 m^{2} (23,130 sq ft)
- Max. depth: 46.54 m (152.7 ft)
- Salinity: 120 g/l

Lake Rândunica (Romanian: Lacul Rândunica, also called Lacul Sf. Ioan) is a natural salt lake in the town of Ocna Sibiului, Sibiu County, Transylvania, Romania. It is one of the many lakes of the Ocna Sibiului mine, a large salt mine which has one of the largest salt reserves in Romania.

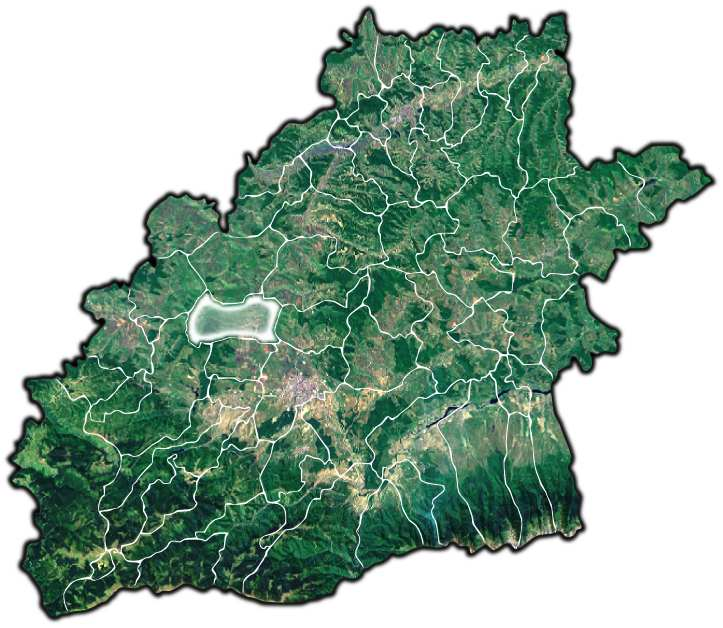
Ocna Sibiului within the Sibiu County

== Name ==
Lacul Rândunica means the swallow lake.

== History ==
The origin of this lake is the abandonment of the "Nepomuceni Johann Grube" salt mine. The salt mine was exploited between 1722-1877 using the bell system with two wells up to the depth of 80 metres (260 ft).

== Information ==
- Surface: 2,149 square metres (23,130 sq ft)
- Maximum Depth: 46.54 metres (152.7 ft)
- Salinity: 120 g/l

== Lakes of the salt mine ==
- Auster
- Lake Avram Iancu-Ocniţa
- Balta cu Nămol
- Brâncoveanu
- Cloşca
- Crişan
- Lacul Fără Fund
- Gura Minei
- Horea
- Mâţelor
- Negru
- Pânzelor
- Rândunica
- Verde (Freshwater lake)
- Vrăjitoarelor (Freshwater lake)
