= Lake Mâțelor =

- Lacul Mâţelor (Romanian)
- Location within Romania
- Location: Ocna Sibiului, Sibiu County, Transylvania, Romania
- Coordinates: 45°52′37″N 24°04′07″E
- Type: Salt lake
- Surface area: 1,232.5 m^{2} (13,267 sq ft)
- Max. depth: 74.70 m (245.1 ft)

Lake Mâţelor (Romanian: Lacul Mâţelor) is a natural salt lake in the town of Ocna Sibiului, Sibiu County, Transylvania, Romania. It is one of the many lakes of the Ocna Sibiului mine, a large salt mine which has one of the largest salt reserves in Romania.

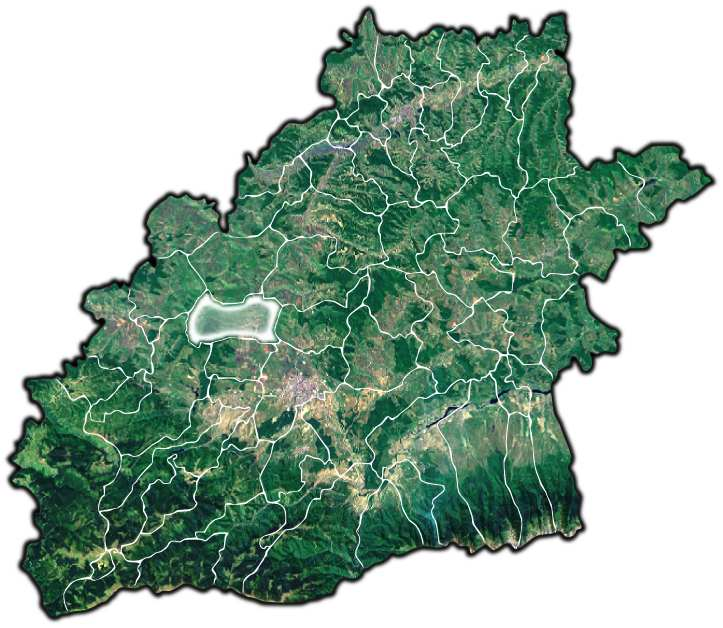
Ocna Sibiului within the Sibiu County

== Name ==
Lacul Mâţelor means lake of the small cats or lake of the kittens.

== History ==
The salt mine on which it is located is not documented, but it was exploited in the late middle-ages with a bell-system, at a depth of more than 80 m through two wells.

== Information ==
- Surface: 1,232.5 square metres (13,267 sq ft)
- Maximum Depth: 74.70 metres (245.1 ft) (2nd of the mine's lakes, behind Lake Avram Iancu-Ocniţa)
- Salinity: 34 g/L at the surface, up to 323 g/L at 8.5 m depth.

== Lakes of the salt mine ==
- Auster
- Lake Avram Iancu-Ocniţa
- Balta cu Nămol
- Brâncoveanu
- Cloşca
- Crişan
- Lacul Fără Fund
- Gura Minei
- Horea
- Mâţelor
- Negru
- Pânzelor
- Rândunica
- Verde (Freshwater lake)
- Vrăjitoarelor (Freshwater lake)
