= Lacul Vrăjitoarelor =

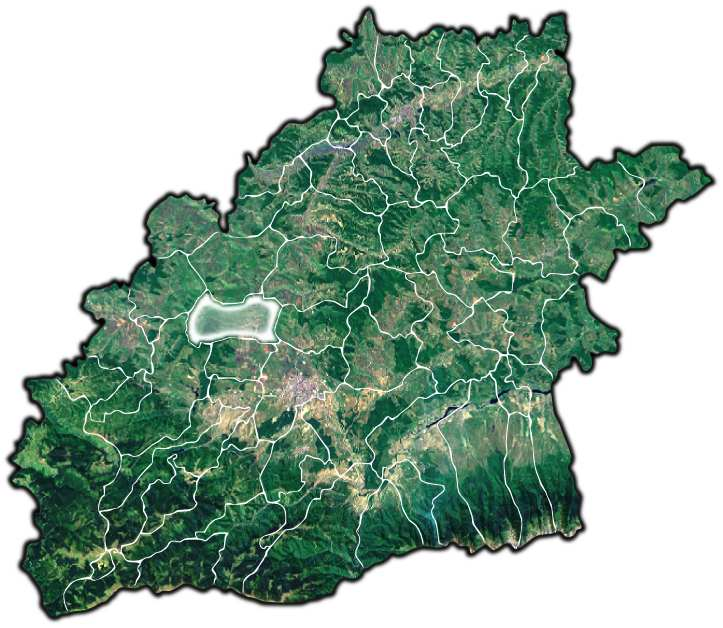
- Location of town Ocna Sibiului in Sibiu County, Transylvania, Romania.

- Location within Romania
- Location: Sibiu County, Transylvania, Romania
- Coordinates: 45°52′49″N 24°04′29″E
- Type: lake
- Max. depth: 0.25 m (9.8 in)

Lacul Vrăjitoarelor is a natural freshwater lake in the town of Ocna Sibiului, Sibiu County, Transylvania, Romania. It is one of the many lakes of the Ocna Sibiului mine, a large salt mine which has one of the largest salt reserves in Romania. Lacul Vrăjitoarelor and Lacul Verde are the only freshwater lakes of the mine, with the others being salt lakes. The lake is very small and is becoming a swamp, which makes it unsuitable for swimming. The lake's maximum depth is 0.25 metres (9.8 in).

== Name ==
Lacul Vrăjitoarelor means Lake of the Witches in Romanian.

== Lakes of the salt mine ==
- Auster
- Lake Avram Iancu-Ocniţa
- Balta cu Nămol
- Brâncoveanu
- Cloşca
- Crişan
- Lacul Fără Fund
- Gura Minei
- Horea
- Mâţelor
- Negru
- Pânzelor
- Rândunica
- Verde (Freshwater lake)
- Vrăjitoarelor (Freshwater lake)
