= Lake Pânzelor =

Transylvanian lake

- Lacul Inului
- Location within Romania
- Location: Ocna Sibiului, Sibiu County, Transylvania, Romania
- Coordinates: 45°52′37″N 24°04′01″E
- Type: Salt lake
- Surface area: 875 m^{2} (9,420 sq ft)
- Max. depth: 46 m (151 ft)

The Lake of Pânzelor (Romanian: Lacul Pânzelor, also called Lacul Inului) is a natural salt lake in the town of Ocna Sibiului, Sibiu County, Transylvania, Romania. It is one of the many lakes of the Ocna Sibiului mine, a large salt mine which has one of the largest salt reserves in Romania.

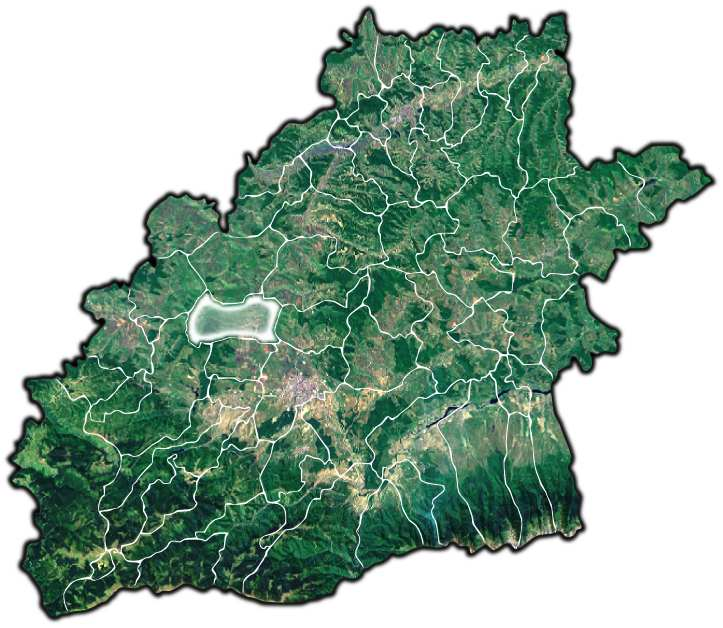
Ocna Sibiului within the Sibiu County

== Name ==
In Romanian, Lacul Pânzelor means The lake of webs. Its other name (Lacul Inului) means the lake of flax.

== History ==
The lake originates from the "Josef" salt mine, exploited with two wells and abandoned in 1770, due to strong infiltration of water through the walls.

== Information ==
- Surface: 875 square metres (9,420 sq ft)
- Maximum depth: 46 metres (151 ft)
- Salinity: 9 g/L at the surface, increases to 320 g/L at 5.5 m depth.

== Lakes of the salt mine ==
- Auster
- Lake Avram Iancu-Ocniţa
- Balta cu Nămol
- Brâncoveanu
- Cloşca
- Crişan
- Lacul Fără Fund
- Gura Minei
- Horea
- Mâţelor
- Negru
- Pânzelor
- Rândunica
- Verde (Freshwater lake)
- Vrăjitoarelor (Freshwater lake)
