= Lake Horea =

- Lacul Horea (Romanian)
- Location within Romania
- Location: Ocna Sibiului, Sibiu County, Transylvania, Romania
- Coordinates: 45.876998°N 24.063268°E
- Type: Salt lake
- Max. depth: 44.50 m (146.0 ft)
- Salinity: 69-330 g/l

Lake Horea (Romanian: Lacul Horea) is a natural salt lake in the town of Ocna Sibiului, Sibiu County, in the historical Transylvania region of Romania. It is one of the many lakes of the Ocna Sibiului mine, a large salt mine which has one of the largest salt reserves in Romania. It is one of the three lakes of the mine's strand, the other ones being Lake Crișan and Lake Cloșca.

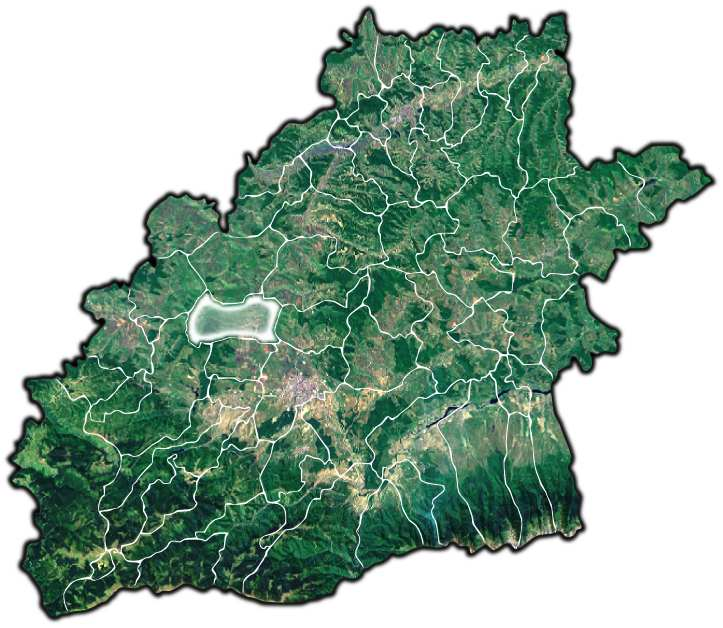
Ocna Sibiului within the Sibiu County

== Name ==
The lake was named after Vasile Ursu Nicola, commonly known as Horea, who was a Transylvanian Romanian leader of the Revolt of Horea, Cloșca and Crișan in 1784-85.

== History ==
Lakes Horea, Cloșca, and Crișan were formed by the flood of six non-certified salines. Other lakes were mentioned in their place in 1770.

== Information ==
- Maximum depth: 44.50 metres (146.0 ft)
- Salinity: 69-330 g/l
- Fauna: Artemia salina

== Lakes of the salt mine ==
- Auster
- Lake Avram Iancu-Ocniţa
- Balta cu Nămol
- Brâncoveanu
- Cloşca
- Crişan
- Lacul Fără Fund
- Gura Minei
- Horea
- Mâţelor
- Negru
- Pânzelor
- Rândunica
- Verde (Freshwater lake)
- Vrăjitoarelor (Freshwater lake)
