= Lake Brâncoveanu =

- Lacul Brâncoveanu (Romanian)
- Location within Romania
- Location: Ocna Sibiului, Sibiu County, Transylvania, Romania
- Coordinates: 45°52′19″N 24°03′56″E
- Type: Salt lake
- Surface area: 567.5 m^{2} (6,109 sq ft)
- Max. depth: 13.6 m (45 ft)
- Salinity: 310 g/L

Lake Brâncoveanu (Romanian: Lacul Brâncoveanu) is a natural salt lake in the town of Ocna Sibiului, Sibiu County, Transylvania, Romania. It is one of the many lakes of the Ocna Sibiului mine, a large salt mine which has one of the largest salt reserves in Romania. The lake has the biggest salinity out of every lake in the mine and is one of Romania's most salty lakes.

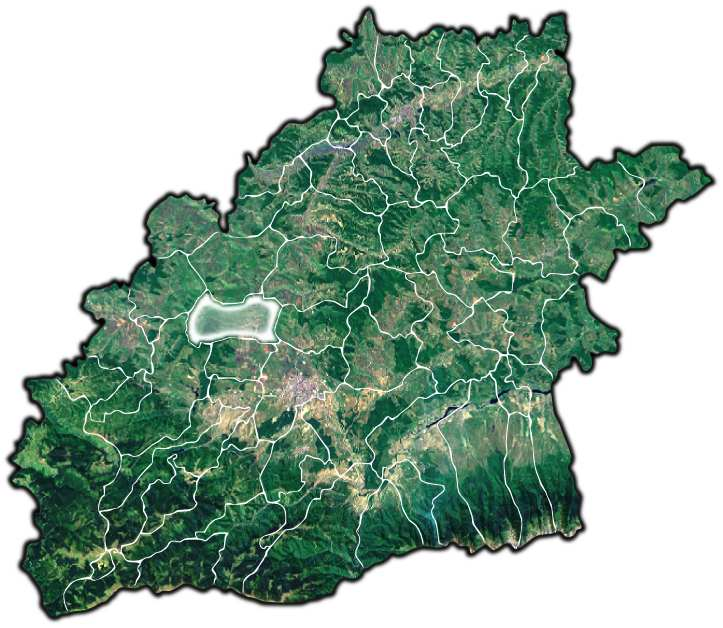
Ocna Sibiului within the Sibiu County

== Name ==
The lake is named after Constantin Brâncoveanu, a ruler of Wallachia.

== History ==
Lake Brâncoveanu is situated on the site of a salt mine that was in operation until 1699, when water infiltration caused it to be abandoned. In 1966, the water level of the lake had a sharp decrease of 11 m, because of the leakage of water through a crack produced in the salt wall in the underground lake adjacent to the Ignatius mine.

== Information ==
- Surface: 567.5 square metres (6,109 sq ft)
- Maximum Depth: 13.6 metres (45 ft)
- Salinity: 310 g/L (highest in the salt mine)

== Lakes of the salt mine ==
- Auster
- Lake Avram Iancu-Ocniţa
- Balta cu Nămol
- Brâncoveanu
- Cloşca
- Crişan
- Lacul Fără Fund
- Gura Minei
- Horea
- Mâţelor
- Negru
- Pânzelor
- Rândunica
- Verde (Freshwater lake)
- Vrăjitoarelor (Freshwater lake)
