= Lacul Verde (Ocna Sibiului) =

- Location within Romania
- Location: Ocna Sibiului, Sibiu County, Transylvania, Romania
- Coordinates: 45°52′16″N 24°03′48″E
- Type: Lake
- Surface area: 3,001.3 m^{2} (32,306 sq ft)
- Max. depth: 3.25 m (10.7 ft)
- Salinity: 8-9 g/l

Lacul Verde (literally Green Lake) is a natural freshwater lake of the Ocna Sibiului mine, Romania. It is the only major freshwater lake of the mine, with the other lakes being salt lakes. The Lacul Vrăjitoarelor is also a freshwater lake, but it is too small and the condition is too poor for swimming. Lacul Verde is located in the city of Ocna Sibiului, Sibiu County, Transylvania, Romania.

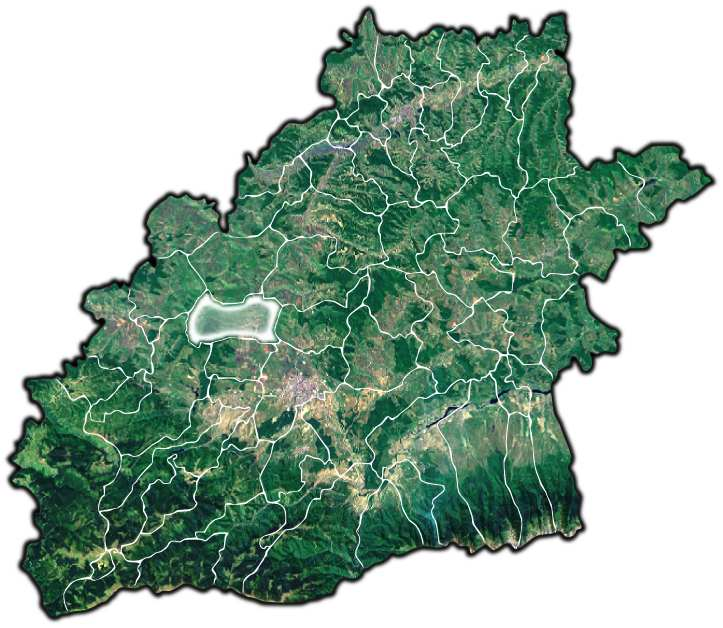
Ocna Sibiului within the Sibiu County

== History ==
The origin of the lake is the collapse of two nearby, unrecognized saltworks, which were exploited at the same time and later abandoned due to water infiltration.

== Information ==
- Surface: 3,001.3 square metres (32,306 sq ft)
- Maximum depth: 3.25 metres (10.7 ft)
- Salinity: 8-9 g/l

== Lakes of the salt mine ==
- Auster
- Lake Avram Iancu-Ocniţa
- Balta cu Nămol
- Brâncoveanu
- Cloşca
- Crişan
- Lacul Fără Fund
- Gura Minei
- Horea
- Mâţelor
- Negru
- Pânzelor
- Rândunica
- Verde (Freshwater lake)
- Vrăjitoarelor (Freshwater lake)
