= Lacul Negru (Ocna Sibiului) =

- Location within Romania
- Location: Ocna Sibiului, Sibiu County, Transylvania, Romania
- Coordinates: 45°52′25″N 24°03′55″E
- Type: Salt lake
- Surface area: 504.8 m^{2} (5,434 sq ft)
- Max. depth: 1 m (3 ft 3 in)
- Salinity: 280 g/l

Lacul Negru (meaning the black lake) is a natural salt lake in the town of Ocna Sibiului, Sibiu County, Transylvania, Romania. It is one of the many lakes of the Ocna Sibiului mine, a large salt mine which has one of the largest salt reserves in Romania. It has one of the smallest depths of all the lakes, with its maximum depth only reaching about 1 metre (3 ft 3 in).

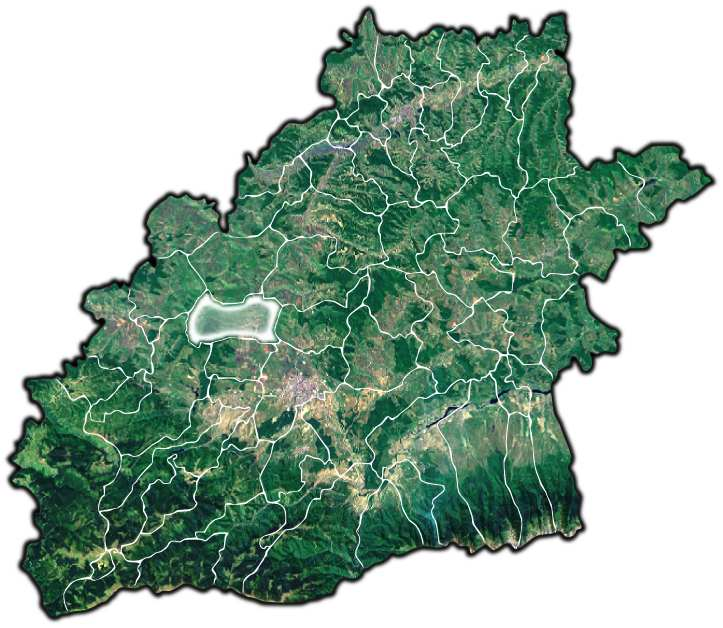
Ocna Sibiului within the Sibiu County

== Name ==
The lake's name is The Black Lake, because the lake has mud at its bottom, making its water black. The salt mine only has two lakes with mud: Lacul Negru and Lacul cu Nămol (meaning the lake with mud).

== History ==
Lacul Negru originates from three small salt lakes.

== Information ==
- Surface: 504.8 square metres (5,434 sq ft)
- Maximum depth: ~1 m
- Salinity: 280 g/l

== Lakes of the salt mine ==
- Auster
- Lake Avram Iancu-Ocniţa
- Balta cu Nămol
- Brâncoveanu
- Cloşca
- Crişan
- Lacul Fără Fund
- Gura Minei
- Horea
- Mâţelor
- Negru
- Pânzelor
- Rândunica
- Verde (Freshwater lake)
- Vrăjitoarelor (Freshwater lake)
