= Lake Gura Minei =

- Lacul Gura Minei (Romanian)
- Location within Romania
- Location: Ocna Sibiului, Sibiu County, Transylvania, Romania
- Coordinates: 45°52′24″N 24°03′53″E
- Type: Salt lake
- Surface area: 969.33 m^{2} (10,433.8 sq ft)
- Max. depth: 27 metres (89 ft)

Lake Gura Minei (Romanian: Lacul Gura Minei) is a natural salt lake in the town of Ocna Sibiului, Sibiu County, Transylvania, Romania. It is one of the many lakes of the Ocna Sibiului mine, a large salt mine which has one of the largest salt reserves in Romania.

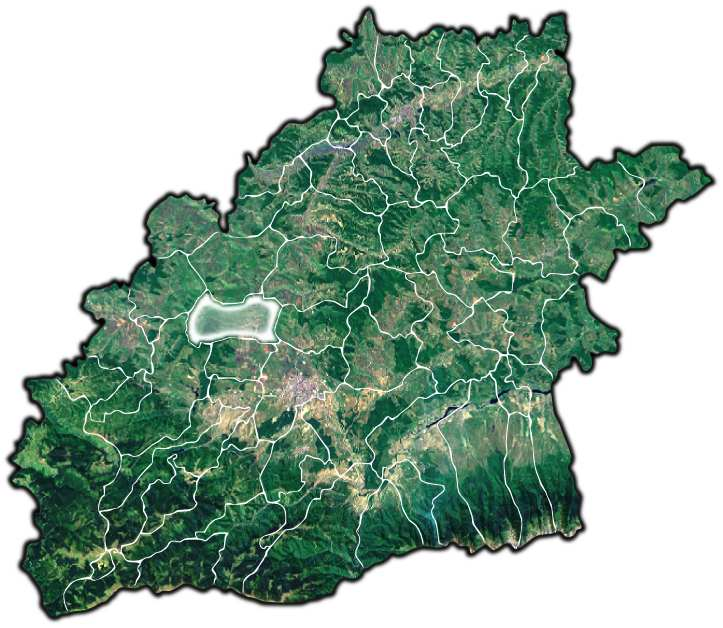
Ocna Sibiului within the Sibiu County

== Name ==
Literally translated from Romanian, "Lacul Gura Minei" means "the mine's mouth lake".

== History ==
Lake Gura Minei was formed by the collapse of a shaft in the north of the Ignaţiu salt mine, opened in 1780. The salt mine was abandoned in 1931 and today forms a huge underground lake with a surface of over 12,000 square metres (130,000 ft^{2}).

== Information ==
- Surface: 969.33 square metres (10,433.8 sq ft)
- Maximum depth: 27 metres (89 ft)

== Lakes of the salt mine ==
- Auster
- Lake Avram Iancu-Ocniţa
- Balta cu Nămol
- Brâncoveanu
- Cloşca
- Crişan
- Lacul Fără Fund
- Gura Minei
- Horea
- Mâţelor
- Negru
- Pânzelor
- Rândunica
- Verde (Freshwater lake)
- Vrăjitoarelor (Freshwater lake)
