= Castra of Ocna Sibiului =

Fort in the Roman province of Dacia

- Location within Romania
- 45°52′N 24°01′E
- Location: Ocna Sibiului, Sibiu, Romania

History
- Founded: 2nd century AD
- Abandoned: 2nd century AD

Site notes
- Condition: Ruined

The castra of Ocna Sibiului was a fort in the Roman province of Dacia. The fort was built and abandoned in the 2nd century AD. Its ruins were unearthed on the Topârcii Hill in Ocna Sibiului (Romania).

== See also ==
- List of castra
