= Ocna Sibiului mine =

Salt mine in Romania

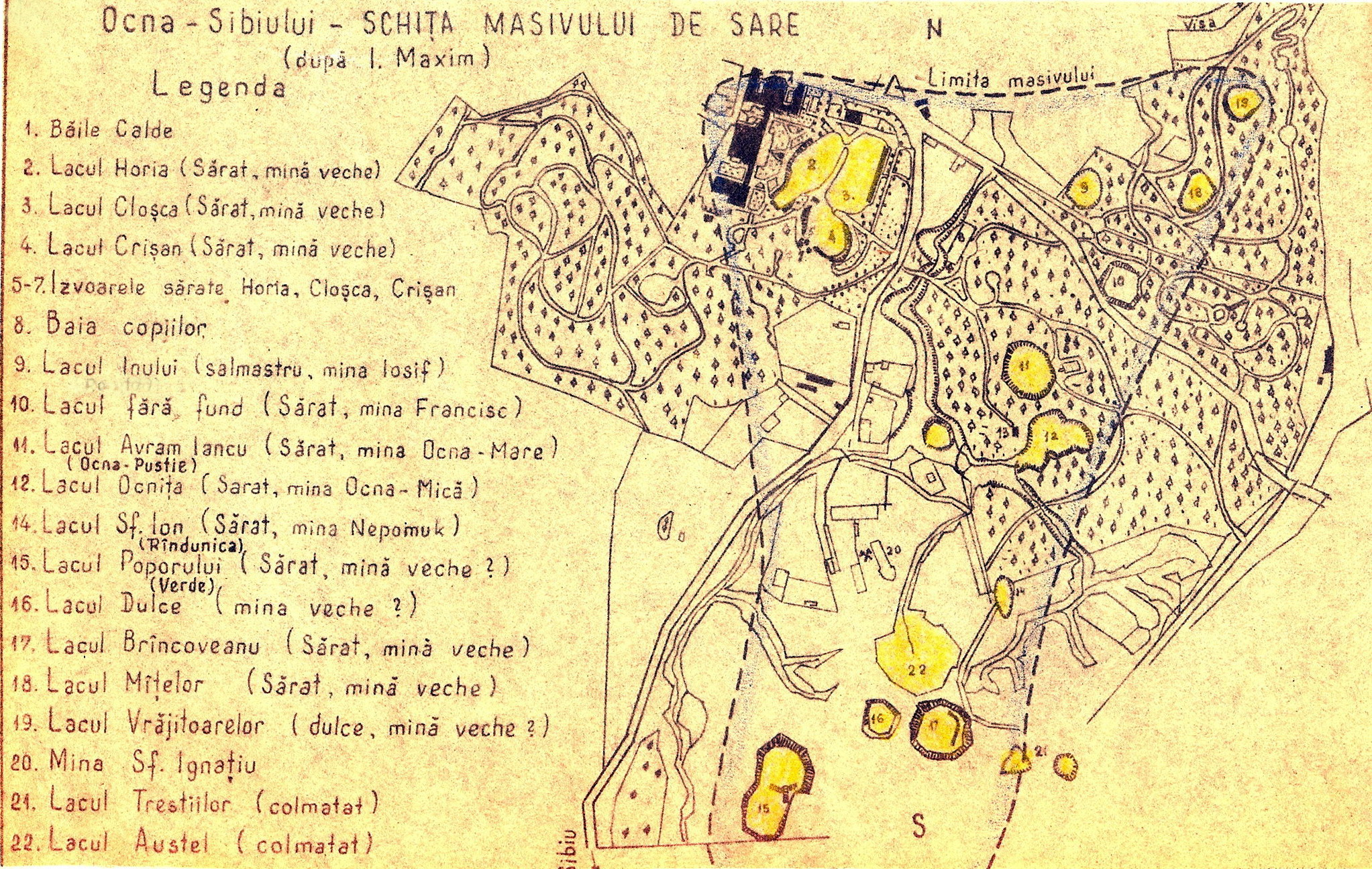
- 1930 map by Ion Maxim
- Location: Ocna Sibiului, Sibiu County, Romania
- Products: Sodium chloride
- Company: State owned (Salrom)

The Ocna Sibiului mine is a large salt mine located in central Romania, in Sibiu County, close to Ocna Sibiului. The mine represents one of the largest salt reserves in Romania, having estimated reserves of 61 billion tonnes of NaCl.

== Lakes of the salt mine ==
- Lacul Auster
- Lake Brâncoveanu
- Lake Gura Minei
- Lake Rândunica
- Lacul Negru
- Lacul cu Nămol
- Lake Horea
- Lake Cloșca
- Lake Crișan
- Lake Mâţelor
- Lacul Fără Fund
- Lacul Verde (Freshwater lake)
- Lake Pânzelor
- Lacul Vrăjitoarelor (Freshwater lake)
- Lake Avram Iancu-Ocnița
- Lake Mihai Viteazul
