= Lacul Auster =

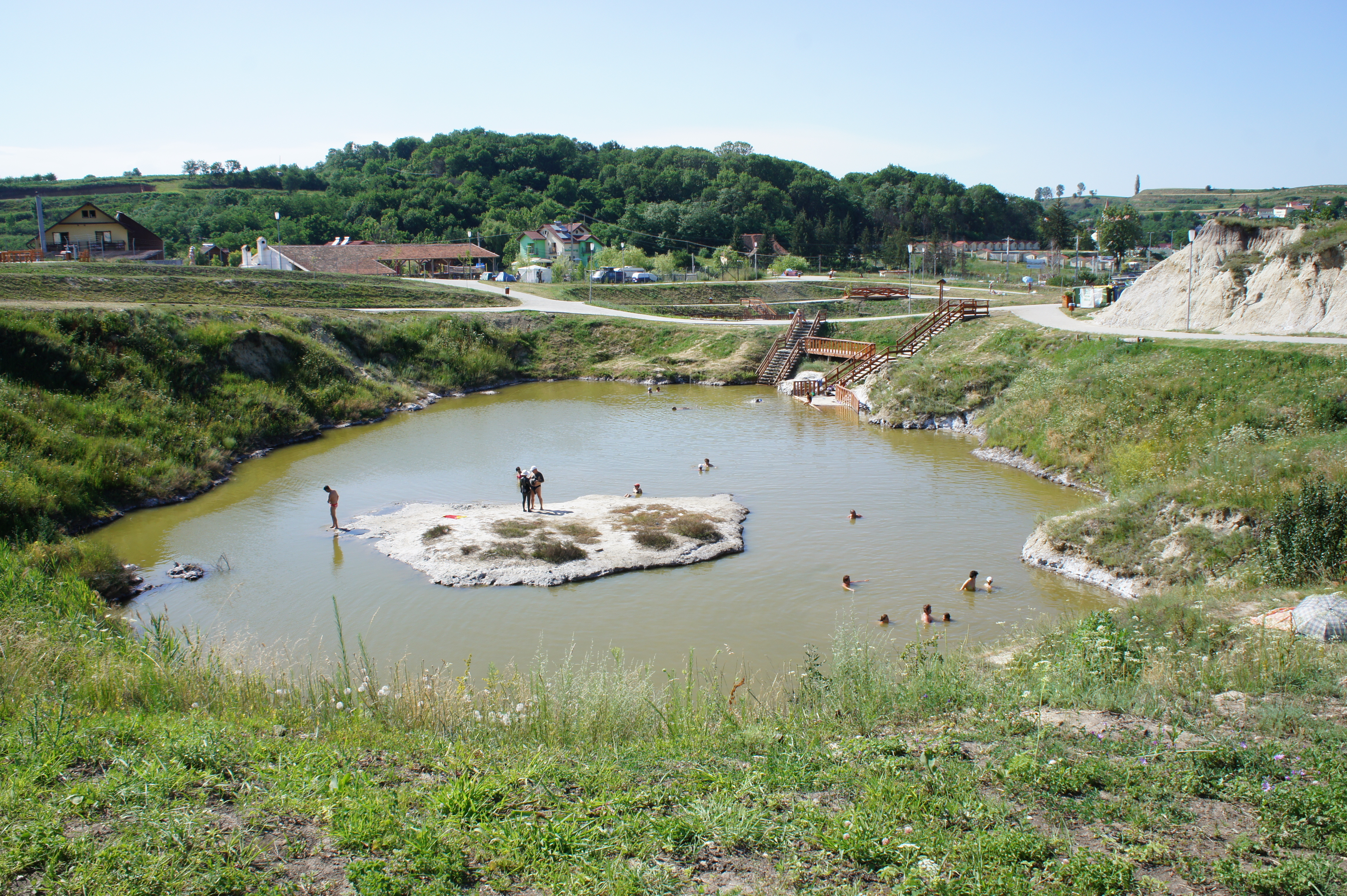
- Lacul Auster with its island in the middle (2012 photo)

- Location within Romania
- Location: Ocna Sibiului, Sibiu County, Transylvania, Romania
- Coordinates: 45°52′21″N 24°03′54″E
- Type: Salt lake
- Surface area: 254 m^{2} (2,730 sq ft)
- Max. depth: 2.5 m (8 ft 2 in)
- Salinity: 140 g/l

Lacul Auster (Romanian for the austere lake) is a natural salt lake in the town of Ocna Sibiului, Sibiu County, Transylvania, Romania. It is one of the many lakes of the Ocna Sibiului mine, a large salt mine which has one of the largest salt reserves in Romania.

In the middle of the lake, an islet has been formed. The islet makes the lake unique among the other lakes of the mine.

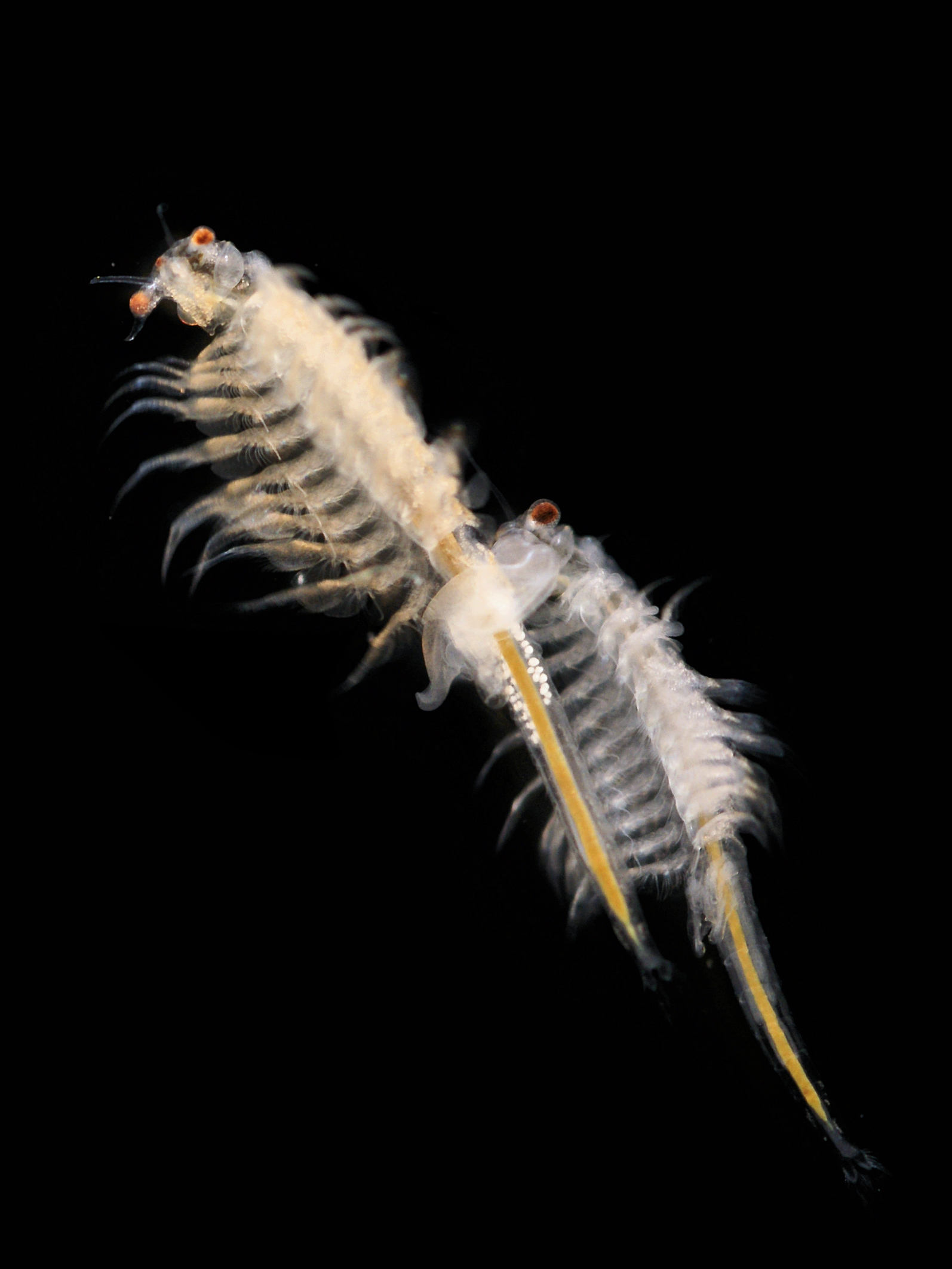
Artemia salina, the inhabitants of the lake

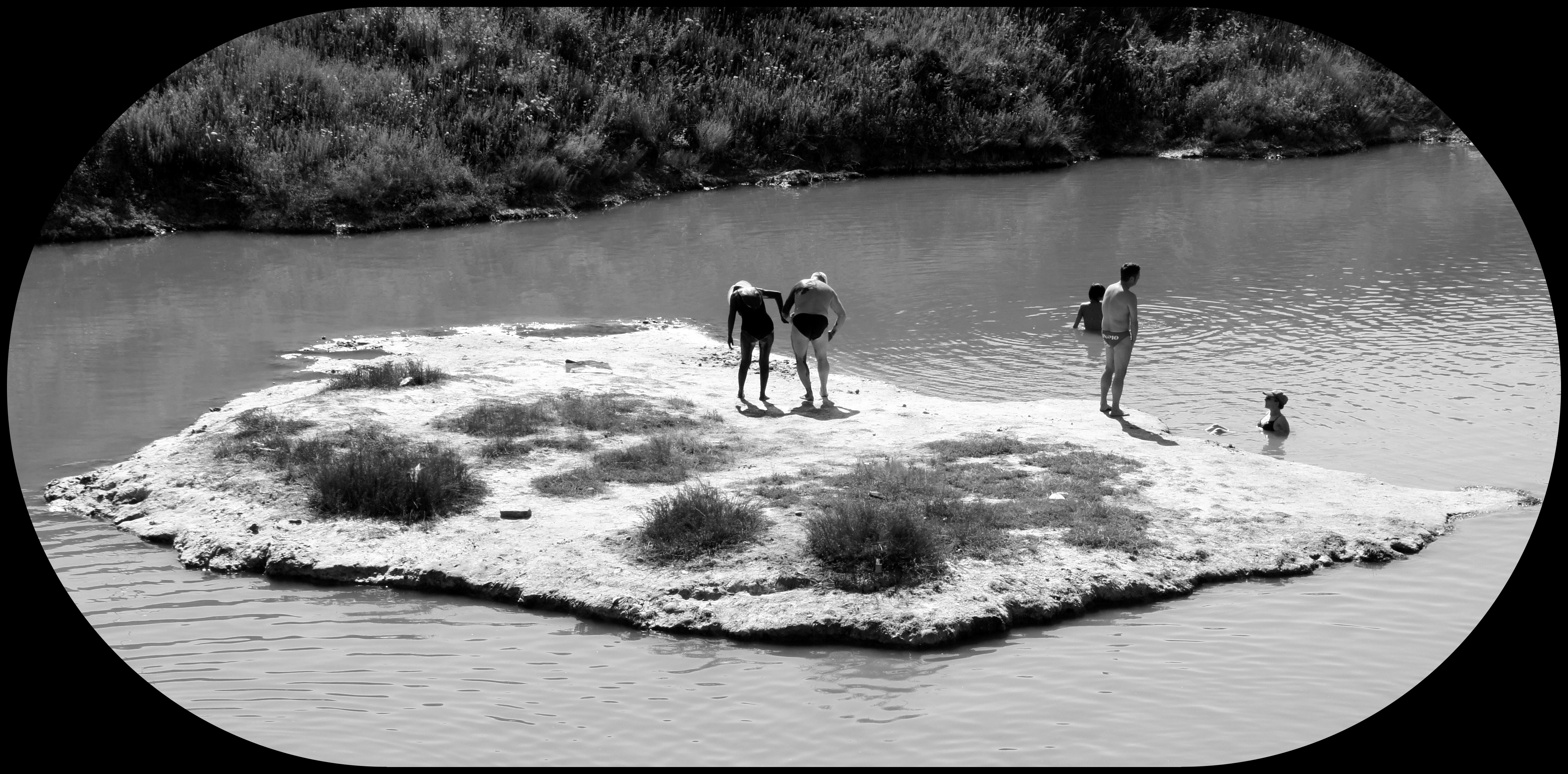
Closer look at the island

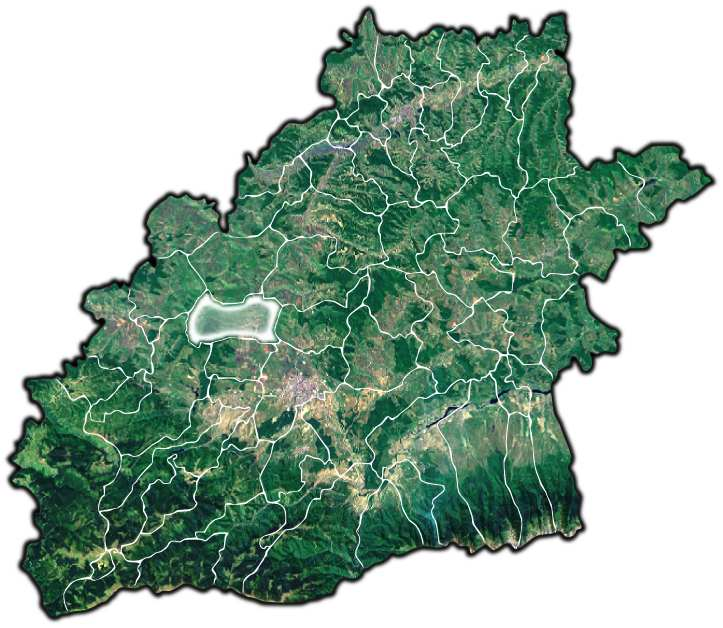
Ocna Sibiului within the Sibiu County

== Name ==
In Romanian, the word auster means austere. The lake is nicknamed Lacul cu insula (lit. the Lake with the Island) because of its island, which makes it unique among the salt mine's lakes. Previously, the lake had the nickname Lacul Roșu (the Red Lake) due to its reddish color.

== History ==
Lacul Auster was formed on the site of an old non-documented saltworks. In 1922, its water level was much higher than at present, and it was lowered by artificial drainage because it was believed that its waters flooded the Ignaţiu salt mine, which was in operation.

== Information ==
- Surface: 254 square metres (2,730 sq ft)
- Maximum depth: 2.50 metres (8 ft 2 in)
- Salinity: 140 g/l
- Fauna: Artemia salina

== Lakes of the salt mine ==
- Auster
- Lake Avram Iancu-Ocniţa
- Balta cu Nămol
- Brâncoveanu
- Cloşca
- Crişan
- Lacul Fără Fund
- Gura Minei
- Horea
- Mâţelor
- Negru
- Pânzelor
- Rândunica
- Verde (Freshwater lake)
- Vrăjitoarelor (Freshwater lake)
