= Ierusalima Gligor =

Eastern Orthodox Romanian hegumen

- Born: 7 June 1929; Ocna Sibiului
- Died: 21 April 2021 (aged 91); Tismana Monastery
- Occupation: Christian nun
- Position held: hegumen (1958–2010)

Ierusalima Gligor, also known as Ierusalima of Tismana, (7 June 1929, in Ocna Sibiului – 21 April 2021, at the Tismana Monastery) was a Romanian nun, stavrophore and hegumen, described as "the pillar of the Tismana Monastery in hard times, in the old days of communism", known beyond Romania as "a model of modesty and wisdom and skill in monastic matters".

She served as the hegumen of the monastery for 51 years, from 26 December 1958 to 21 May 2010.

== Biography ==
Gligor was born in Ocna Sibiului on 7 June 1929. She chose the monastic life at the age of 17, in 1946, initially as a novice either at the Bistrița Monastery or the Horezu Monastery. Starting in 1951, she joined the Tismana Monastery with a group of nuns. She ultimately became a stavrophore. On 26 December 1958, following the arrest of the previous abbess under false charges brought by the Romanian People's Republic, she was elected as the monastery's hegumen. During the communist era, under the leadership of Gligor and the previous abbess, the liturgy was always celebrated, although belief in anything other than the Romanian Workers' Party was strongly discouraged. Gligor was described as a "good householder and organizer"; the monastery aimed to be self-sufficient, having a farm where the nuns grew corn, and a carpet workshop where they tried to maintain traditional local practices and designs. Gligor also initiated the restoration of the monastery and church, and assigned nuns to open and reopen other monasteries. In 1979, together with the nuns of the monastery, she commissioned a silver reliquary from Romanian artist Gheorghe Stoica to house relics of Nicodemus the Hagiorite, John Chrysostom, and Ignatius of Antioch.

She held this position until 21 May 2010. Gligor died on 21 April 2021.
