= Ocna Sibiului =

Ocna Sibiului Salzburg (German) Vízakna (Hungarian)
- Town
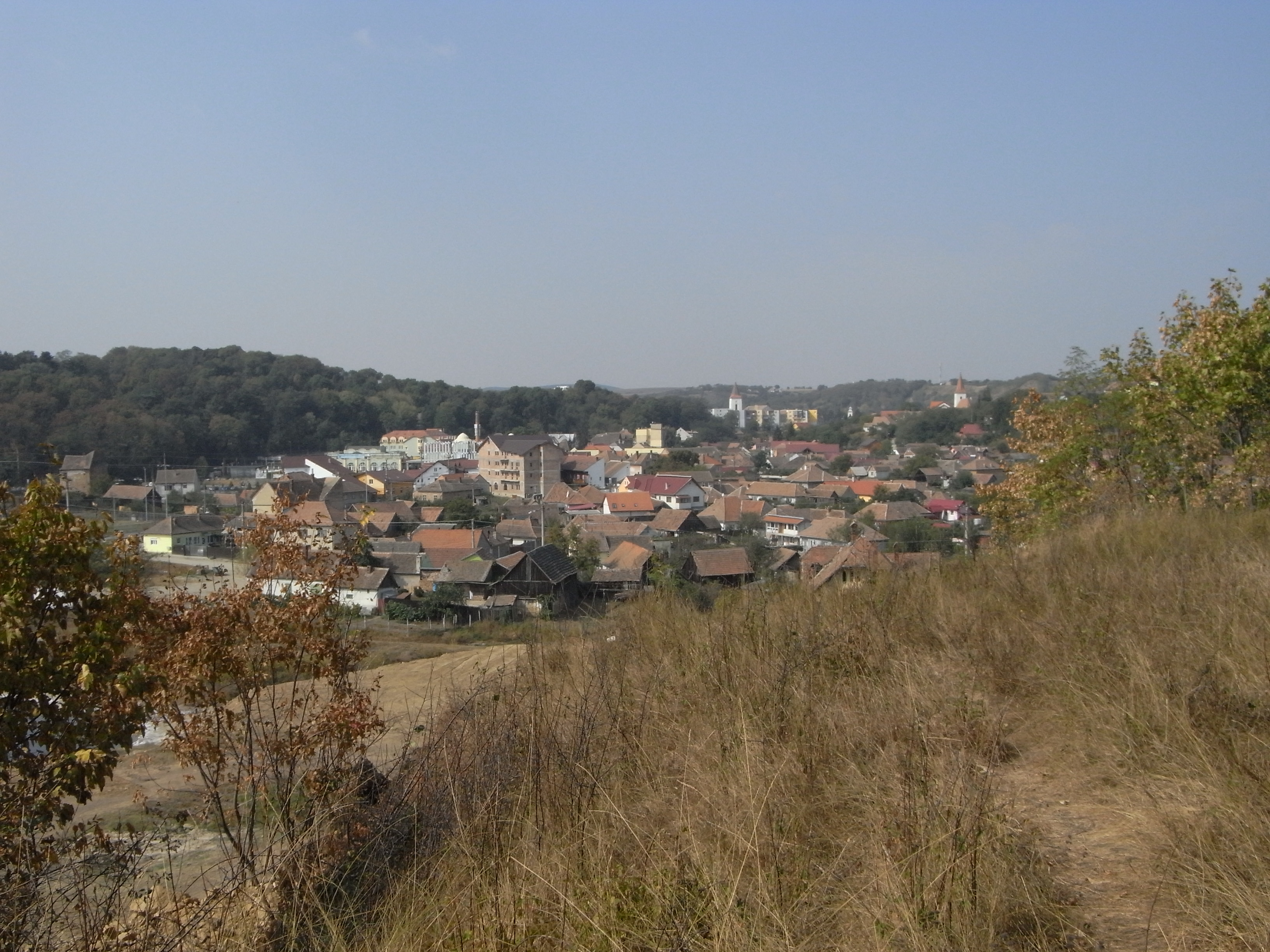
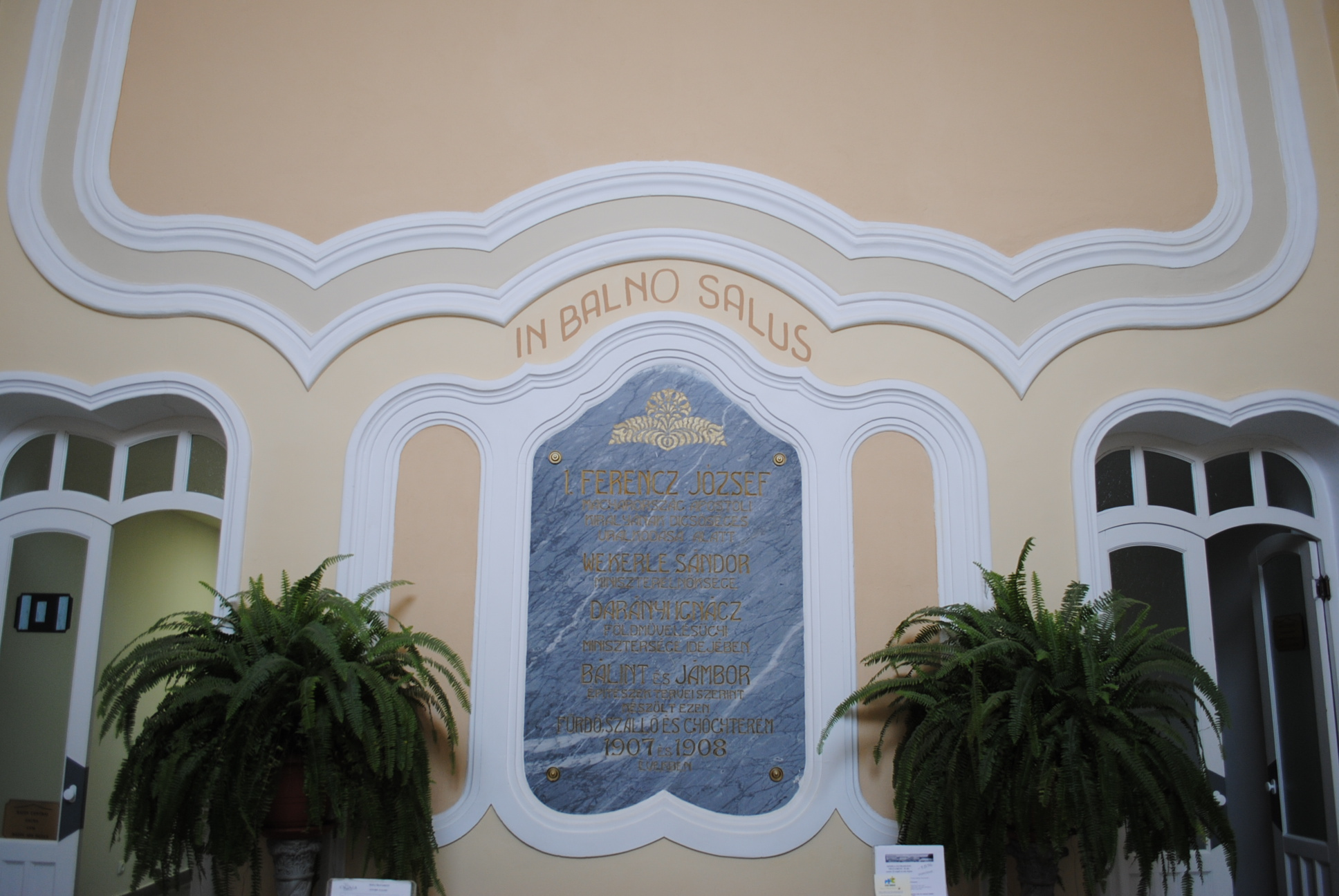
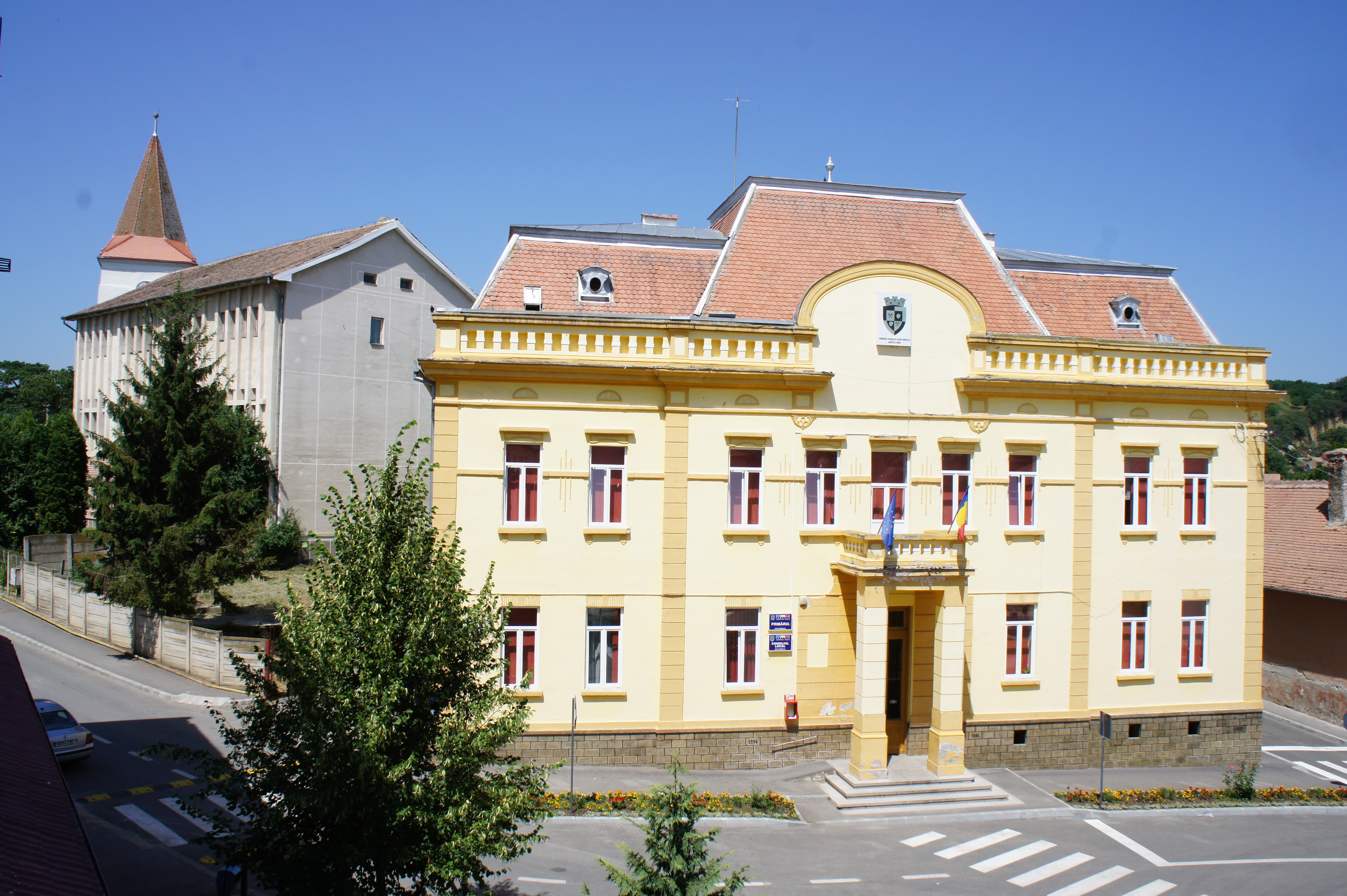
- View of Ocna Sibiului from the east Bath pavilion Traian Square

- Coat of arms

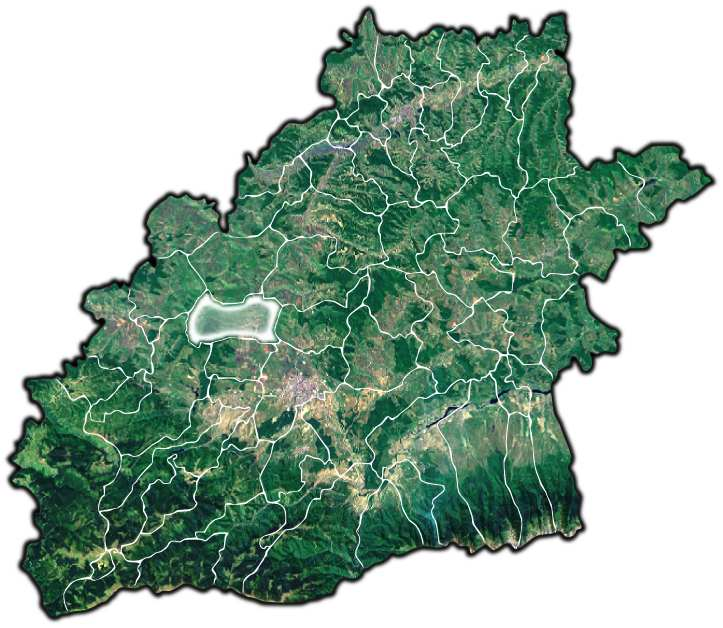
- Location in Sibiu County

- Location in Romania
- Coordinates: 45°52′29″N 24°4′0″E
- Country: Romania
- County: Sibiu

Government
  - Mayor (2024–2028): George-Claudiu Predescu (PNL)
- Area: 87.46 km^{2} (33.77 sq mi)
- Elevation: 408 m (1,339 ft)
- Population (2021-12-01): 3,434
  - Density: 39.26/km^{2} (101.7/sq mi)
- Time zone: UTC+02:00 (EET)
  - Summer (DST): UTC+03:00 (EEST)
- Postal code: 555600
- Area code: +(40) 0269
- Vehicle reg.: SB
- Website: www.primariaocnasibiului.ro

Historical population
Year	Pop.	±%
1912	4,048	—
1977	5,048	+24.7%
1992	4,423	−12.4%
2002	4,184	−5.4%
2011	3,372	−19.4%
2021	3,434	+1.8%
Source: Census data

Ocna Sibiului (German: Salzburg; Hungarian: Vízakna) is a town in the centre of Sibiu County, in southern Transylvania, central Romania, 10 km (6.2 mi) to the north-west of the county seat, Sibiu. The town administers a single village, Topârcea (Tschapertsch; Toporcsa).

The first spa resort was established here in 1845, and since then Ocna Sibiului has earned a reputation thanks to its heliothermal lakes formed on the site of old salt mines that had collapsed.

There are several salt lakes (former collapsed salt mines) on the salt massif.

The temperate climate, aerosol-rich air, annual temperatures above the regional average, and recent renovations of the spa infrastructure have helped restore the town’s popularity as a health resort.

Ocna Sibiului is also of archaeological interest: Bronze Age tools (dating from approximately 1900–800 BC) have been discovered in the area and are currently exhibited at the Brukenthal Museum in Sibiu.

== Demographics ==
At the 2011 census, the town had 3,372 inhabitants, of which 89.4% were Romanians and 9.7% Hungarians. At the 2021 census, Ocna Sibiului had a population of 3,434; of those, 77.34% were Romanians, 6.61% Hungarians, and 2.82% Roma.

== Natives ==
- Júlia Bányai (1824 – 1883), freedom fighter in the Hungarian Revolution of 1848
- Nicolae Cristea (1834 – 1902), Orthodox priest, professor, journalist, and political activist
- Ierusalima Gligor (1929 – 2021), nun, stavrophore, and hegumen
- Emil Hossu (1941 – 2012), actor
- Lajos Takács (1908 – 1982), jurist and communist politician

== See also ==
- Castra of Ocna Sibiului
- Lacul Auster
- Ocna Sibiului mine

== Image gallery ==
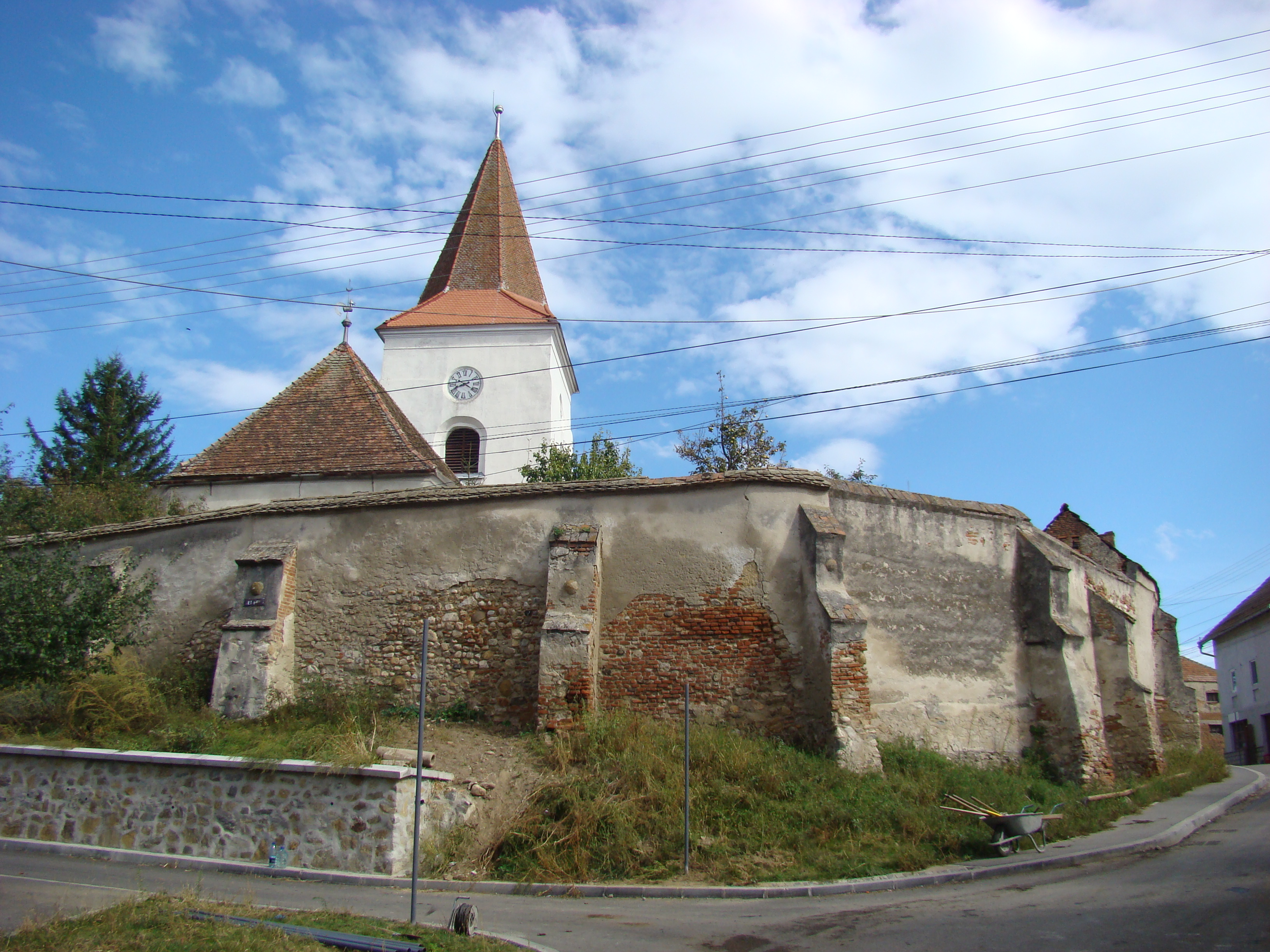
Fortified church

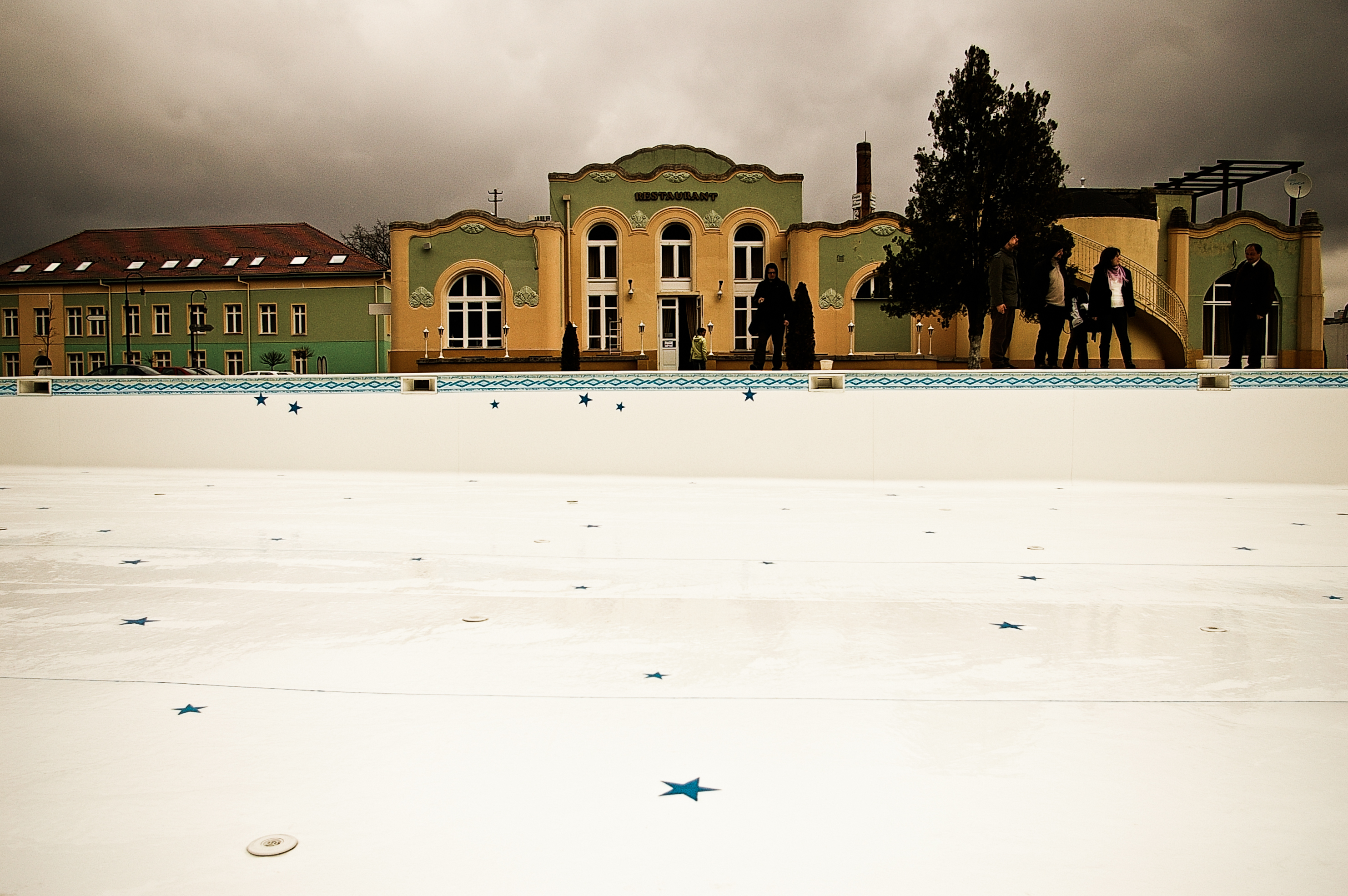
Bath pavilion

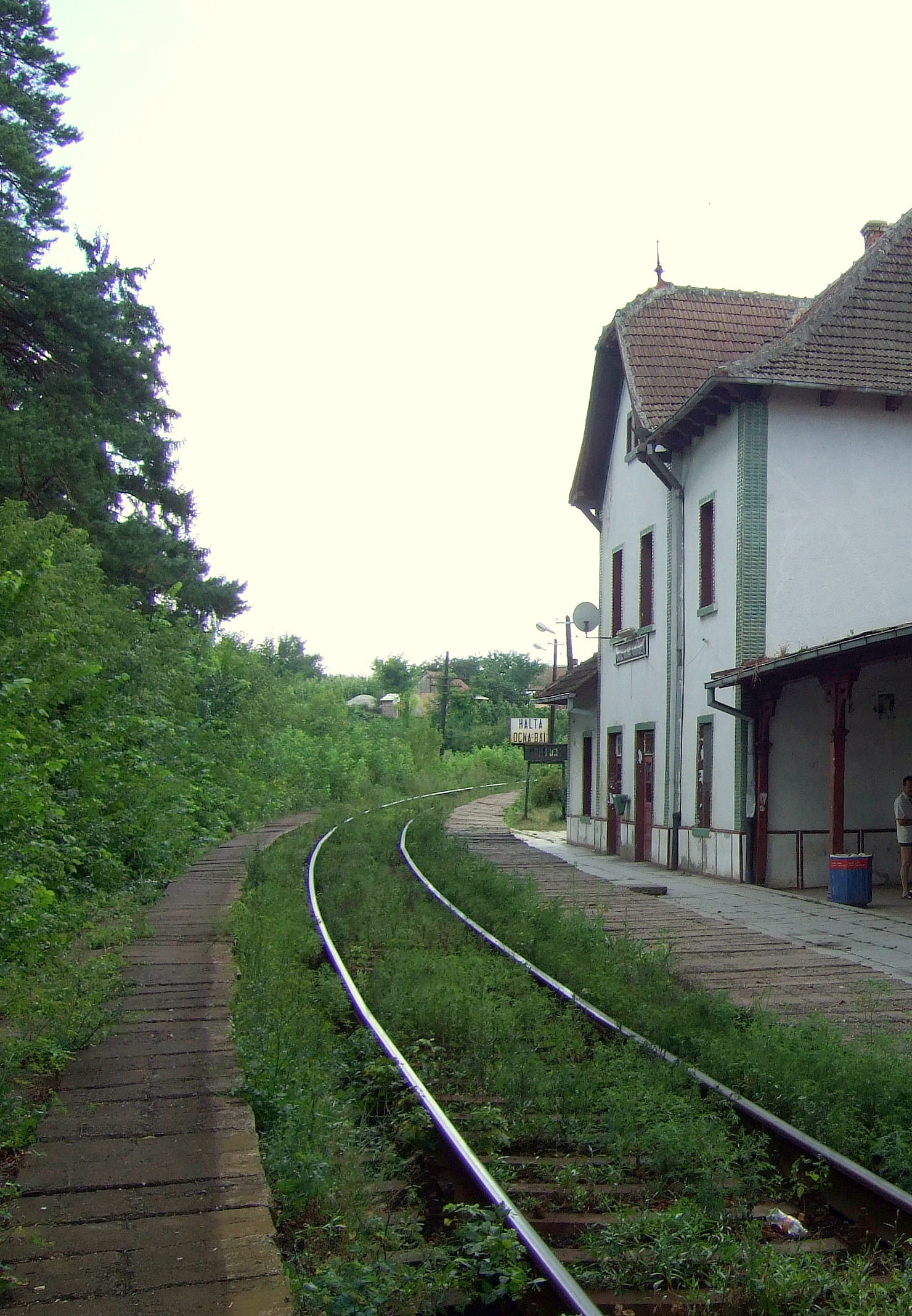
Train station
