= Demographics of Turkey =

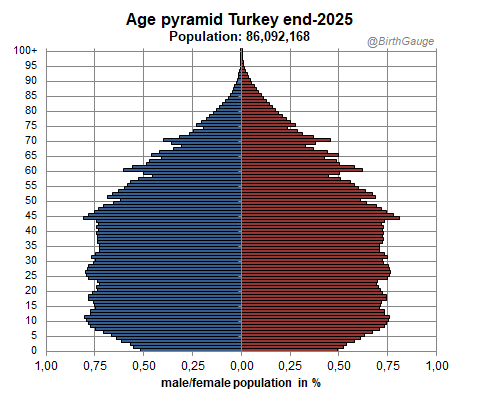
- Population pyramid of Turkey in 2025
- Population: ▲86,502,286 (1 October 2026)
- Density: ▲112/km^{2} (290/sq mi) (2025)
- Growth rate: ▲0.50% (2025)
- Birth rate: ▼10.4 births/1,000 population (2025)
- Death rate: ▼5.7 deaths/1,000 population (2025)
- Life expectancy: ▲78.5 years (2025)
  - male: ▲75.9 years
  - female: ▲81.1 years
- Fertility rate: ▼1.42 children born/woman (2025)
- Infant mortality: ▼9.0 deaths/1,000 live births (2024)
- Net migration rate: ▼ −3.9 migrant(s)/1,000 population (2023)
- Immigrant share: 8.1% (2024)

Age structure
- 0–14 years: ▼20.4% (male 8,992,538/female 8,538,185)
- 15–64 years: ▲68.5% (male 29,781,806/female 29,196,580)
- 65 and over: ▲11.1% (male 4,285,090/female 5,297,969) (2025)

Sex ratio
- Total: 1.01 male(s)/female (2025 est.)
- At birth: 1.05 male(s)/female
- Under 15: 1.05 male(s)/female
- 15–64 years: 1.03 male(s)/female
- 65 and over: 0.83 male(s)/female

Nationality
- Nationality: Turkish citizen
- Major ethnic: Turkish (70–75%)
- Minor ethnic: Kurdish (19%); other minorities (6–11%) (2016 est.)

Language
- Official: Turkish (87.6%)
- Spoken: Kurdish (10.4%); Arabic (1.4%); Others (0.6%)

Demographic features of the population of Turkey include population density, ethnicity, education level, health of the populace, economic status, religious affiliations and other aspects of the population. Its estimated population was 86,502,286 as of 1 October 2026, according to Turkish Statistical Institute. This official figure excludes the registered Syrian refugees under temporary protection status which had a population of about 2.2 million as of the date. Therefore, total population sums up to 88.7 million people.

Turks are the largest ethnic group, comprising 70–75% of the population while Kurds are the second largest with 19%. The others, including Armenians, Arabs, Assyrians, Albanians, Bulgarians, Bosniaks, Circassians, Chechens, Crimean Tatars, Georgians, Greeks, Hemshins, Jews, Laz people, Pomaks, Rum, Russians, Romani and others make 6–11% of the population according to a 2016 estimate by the CIA.

The population has been aging in recent years, with just 20.4% falling in the 0–14 age bracket (down from 26.4% in 2007). The population over the age of 65 is 11.1% (up from 7.1% in 2007). As of 2025, the median age of the Turkish population is 34.9 years (up from 28.3 in 2007). According to OECD/World Bank population statistics, from 1990 to 2008 the population growth in Turkey was 16 million or 29%.

== Population ==
=== Historical population ===
Historical population of Turkey

Historical population

Year	Pop.	±% p.a.
1890	8,274,971	—
1910	12,329,210	+2.01%
1927	13,648,270	+0.60%
1935	16,158,018	+2.13%
1940	17,820,950	+1.98%
1945	18,790,174	+1.06%
1950	20,947,188	+2.20%
1955	24,064,763	+2.81%
1960	27,754,820	+2.89%
1965	31,391,421	+2.49%
1970	35,605,176	+2.55%
1975	40,347,719	+2.53%

Year	Pop.	±% p.a.
1980	44,736,957	+2.09%
1985	50,664,458	+2.52%
1990	56,473,035	+2.19%
2000	67,803,927	+1.85%
2010	73,722,988	+0.84%
2015	78,741,053	+1.33%
2020	83,614,362	+1.21%
2021	84,680,273	+1.27%
2022	85,279,553	+0.71%
2023	85,372,377	+0.11%
2024	85,664,944	+0.34%
2025	86,092,168	+0.50%

=== Urbanization ===
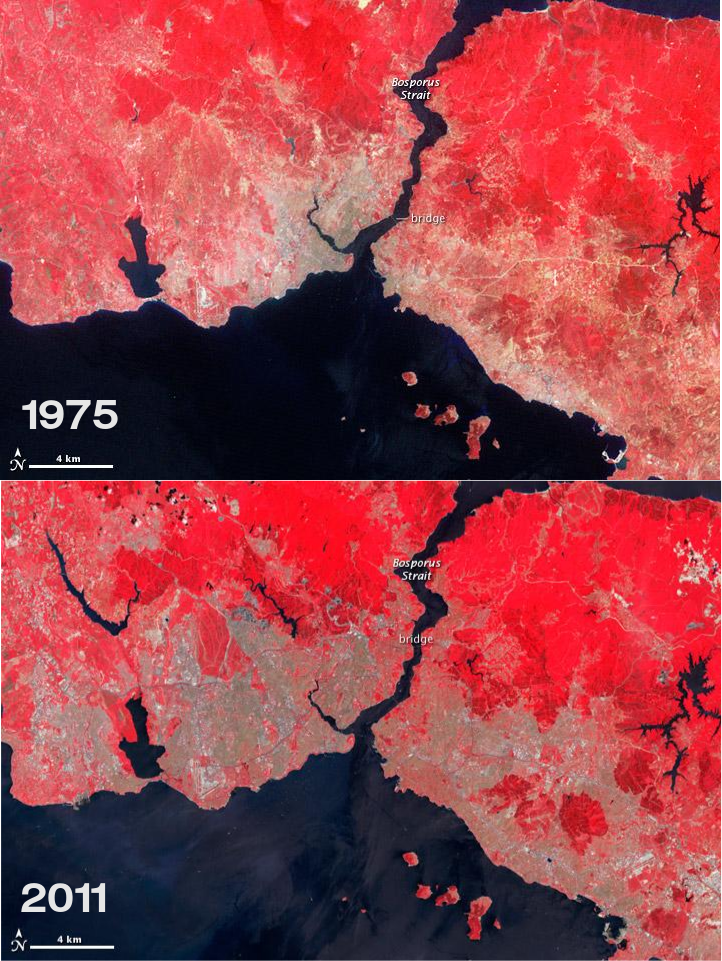
Istanbul has experienced rapid population growth (The gray areas are buildings)

- Population of densely populated urban areas: 67.5%
- Population of intermediate density urban areas: 15.8%
- Population of rural areas: 16.8% (2025)

=== Age structure ===
Overview of the changing age distribution 1935–2025
Year	Total population (census; thousands)	Population by age (%)		
Year	Total population (census; thousands)	0–14	15–64	65+
1935	16,158	41.4%	54.7%	3.9%
1940	17,821	42.1%	54.3%	3.5%
1945	18,790	39.5%	57.1%	3.3%
1950	20,947	38.3%	58.4%	3.3%
1955	24,065	39.4%	57.1%	3.4%
1960	27,755	41.2%	55.2%	3.5%
1965	31,391	41.9%	54.1%	4.0%
1970	35,605	41.8%	53.8%	4.4%
1975	40,348	40.6%	54.8%	4.6%
1980	44,737	39.1%	56.1%	4.7%
1985	50,664	37.6%	58.2%	4.2%
1990	56,473	35.0%	60.7%	4.3%
2000	67,804	29.8%	64.5%	5.7%
2010	73,723	25.6%	67.2%	7.2%
2015	78,741	24.0%	67.8%	8.2%
2020	83,614	22.8%	67.7%	9.5%
2025	86,092	20.4%	68.5%	11.1%

=== Structure of the population ===
Structure of the population

Structure of the population (20.10.1935):

Age group	Male	Female	Total	Percent
Total	7,936,512	8,220,938	16,157,450	100
0–4	1,431,441	1,297,472	2,728,913	16.89
5–9	1,211,031	1,127,759	2,338,790	14.47
10–14	848,909	745,981	1,594,890	9.87
15–19	558,702	485,865	1,044,567	6.47
20–24	749,196	640,153	1,389,349	8.60
25–29	621,971	721,286	1,343,257	8.31
30–34	584,496	642,051	1,226,547	7.59
35–39	486,505	509,582	996,087	6.16
40–44	323,676	473,948	797,624	4.94
45–49	242,922	314,860	557,782	3.45
50–54	225,781	384,373	610,154	3.78
55–59	162,193	195,231	357,424	2.21
60–64	175,346	297,375	472,721	2.93
65–69	100,249	104,966	205,215	1.27
70–74	90,665	125,877	216,542	1.34
75–79	36,289	37,970	74,259	0.46
80–84	31,267	49,176	80,443	0.50
85+	20,376	31,206	51,582	0.32
Unknown	35,497	35,807	71,304	0.44

Age group	Male	Female	Total	Percent
0–14	3,491,381	3,171,212	6,662,593	41.23
15–64	4,130,788	4,664,724	8,795,512	54.44
65+	278,846	349,195	628,041	3.89

Structure of the population (20.10.1940):

Age group	Male	Female	Total	Percent
Total	8,898,912	8,922,038	17,820,950	100
0–4	1,386,164	1,255,841	2,642,005	14.83
5–9	1,417,565	1,264,599	2,682,164	15.05
10–14	1,189,450	989,707	2,179,157	12.22
15–19	828,348	698,268	1,526,616	8.57
20–24	524,398	517,900	1,042,298	5.85
25–29	684,425	704,888	1,389,313	7.80
30–34	617,605	715,603	1,333,208	7.48
35–39	589,660	567,985	1,157,645	6.50
40–44	465,754	530,330	996,084	5.59
45–49	303,224	347,903	651,127	3.65
50–54	247,689	416,071	663,760	3.72
55–59	175,162	216,450	391,612	2.20
60–64	189,814	327,319	517,133	2.90
65–69	100,133	113,816	213,949	1.20
70–74	83,102	131,130	214,232	1.20
75–79	35,800	36,810	72,610	0.41
80–84	32,530	48,634	81,164	0.45
85+	19,856	28,048	47,904	0.27
Unknown	8,233	10,736	18,969	0.11

Age group	Male	Female	Total	Percent
0–14	3,993,179	3,510,147	7,503,326	42.10
15–64	4,626,079	5,042,717	9,668,796	54.26
65+	271,421	358,438	629,859	3.53

Structure of the population (22.10.1945):

Age group	Male	Female	Total	Percent
Total	9,446,580	9,343,594	18,790,174	100
0–4	1,286,705	1,184,799	2,471,504	13.15
5–9	1,348,446	1,242,281	2,590,727	13.79
10–14	1,284,952	1,074,080	2,359,032	12.56
15–19	1,048,701	931,461	1,980,162	10.54
20–24	789,205	691,680	1,480,885	7.88
25–29	484,328	619,069	1,103,397	5.87
30–34	731,283	699,657	1,430,940	7.61
35–39	607,377	578,390	1,185,767	6.31
40–44	542,301	558,000	1,100,301	5.86
45–49	401,379	378,499	779,878	4.15
50–54	282,856	434,107	716,963	3.82
55–59	171,162	219,398	390,560	2.08
60–64	199,908	349,207	549,115	2.92
65–69	98,664	124,606	223,270	1.19
70–74	80,007	132,964	212,971	1.13
75–79	30,422	38,852	69,274	0.37
80–84	28,838	46,220	75,058	0.40
85+	18,752	27,218	45,970	0.24
Unknown	11,294	13,106	24,400	0.13

Age group	Male	Female	Total	Percent
0–14	3,920,103	3,501,160	7,421,263	39.50
15–64	5,258,500	5,459,468	10,717,968	57.04
65+	256,683	369,860	626,543	3.33

Structure of the population (22.10.1950):

Age group	Male	Female	Total	Percent
Total	10,527,085	10,420,103	20,947,188	100
0–4	1,583,013	1,507,310	3,090,323	14.75
5–9	1,336,758	1,236,743	2,573,501	12.29
10–14	1,273,881	1,080,774	2,354,655	11.24
15–19	1,269,676	1,118,275	2,387,951	11.40
20–24	989,606	972,942	1,962,548	9.37
25–29	726,276	751,624	1,477,900	7.06
30–34	523,466	590,563	1,114,029	5.32
35–39	687,486	599,778	1,287,264	6.15
40–44	551,330	595,426	1,146,756	5.47
45–49	499,143	445,245	944,388	4.51
50–54	389,143	471,481	860,624	4.11
55–59	214,041	260,147	474,188	2.26
60–64	196,827	358,825	555,652	2.65
65–69	110,177	152,604	262,781	1.25
70–74	83,100	138,710	221,810	1.06
75–79	33,989	49,329	83,318	0.40
80–84	26,256	46,416	72,672	0.35
85+	19,238	30,843	50,081	0.24
Unknown	13,679	13,068	26,747	0.12

Age group	Male	Female	Total	Percent
0–14	4,193,652	3,824,827	8,018,479	38.28
15–64	6,046,994	6,164,306	12,211,300	58.30
65+	272,760	417,902	690,662	3.30

Structure of the population (23.10.1955):

Age group	Male	Female	Total	Percent
Total	12,233,421	11,831,342	24,064,763	100
0–4	1,982,328	1,876,385	3,858,713	16.03
5–9	1,674,361	1,559,521	3,233,882	13.44
10–14	1,293,749	1,088,876	2,382,625	9.90
15–19	1,246,288	1,086,401	2,332,689	9.69
20–24	1,208,312	1,109,352	2,317,664	9.63
25–29	957,994	1,020,047	1,978,041	8.22
30–34	747,870	730,128	1,477,998	6.14
35–39	518,633	525,015	1,043,648	4.34
40–44	665,731	620,561	1,286,292	5.34
45–49	524,193	472,397	996,590	4.14
50–54	504,577	527,370	1,031,947	4.29
55–59	326,719	308,300	635,019	2.64
60–64	242,673	386,672	629,345	2.62
65–69	126,235	172,553	298,788	1.24
70–74	98,303	170,945	269,248	1.12
75–79	42,539	61,169	103,708	0.43
80–84	31,408	58,663	90,071	0.38
85+	22,219	38,374	60,593	0.25
Unknown	19,289	18,613	37,902	0.16

Age group	Male	Female	Total	Percent
0–14	4,950,438	4,524,782	9,475,220	39.37
15–64	6,942,990	6,786,243	13,729,233	57.05
65+	320,704	501,704	822,408	3.42

Structure of the population (23.10.1960):

Age group	Male	Female	Total	Percent
Total	14,163,888	13,590,932	27,754,820	100
0–4	2,180,155	2,075,706	4,255,861	15.33
5–9	2,072,538	1,924,700	3,997,238	14.40
10–14	1,687,678	1,486,229	3,173,907	11.44
15–19	1,247,397	1,057,623	2,305,020	8.30
20–24	1,175,912	1,126,110	2,302,022	8.29
25–29	1,155,197	1,175,437	2,330,634	8.41
30–34	1,026,237	984,257	2,010,494	7.24
35–39	748,216	692,697	1,440,913	5.19
40–44	504,947	547,576	1,052,523	3.79
45–49	609,233	499,222	1,108,455	3.99
50–54	547,373	580,291	1,127,664	4.06
55–59	423,895	368,834	792,729	2.86
60–64	368,205	460,652	828,857	2.99
65–69	166,113	213,476	379,589	1.37
70–74	113,713	195,360	309,073	1.11
75–79	51,280	78,196	129,476	0.47
80–84	33,918	63,479	97,397	0.35
85+	23,063	40,134	63,197	0.23
Unknown	28,818	20,953	49,771	0.18

Age group	Male	Female	Total	Percent
0–14	5,940,371	5,486,635	11,427,006	41.17
15–64	7,806,612	7,492,699	15,299,311	55.12
65+	388,087	590,645	978,732	3.53

Structure of the population (24.10.1965):

Age group	Male	Female	Total	Percent
Total	15,996,964	15,394,457	31,391,421	100
0–4	2,355,040	2,262,030	4,617,070	14.71
5–9	2,414,482	2,249,520	4,664,002	14.86
10–14	2,057,427	1,810,125	3,867,552	12.32
15–19	1,545,911	1,364,144	2,910,055	9.27
20–24	1,210,980	1,133,156	2,344,136	7.47
25–29	1,054,909	1,161,156	2,216,065	7.06
30–34	1,138,450	1,134,571	2,273,021	7.24
35–39	997,446	934,713	1,932,159	6.15
40–44	704,595	676,864	1,381,459	4.40
45–49	445,457	429,623	875,080	2.79
50–54	612,093	590,947	1,203,040	3.83
55–59	449,480	415,150	864,630	2.75
60–64	452,705	501,500	954,205	3.04
65–69	257,812	271,173	528,985	1.69
70–74	145,636	220,745	366,381	1.17
75–79	60,950	94,624	155,574	0.49
80–84	41,187	78,089	119,276	0.38
85+	24,419	47,890	72,309	0.23
Unknown	27,985	18,437	46,422	0.15

Age group	Male	Female	Total	Percent
0–14	6,826,949	6,321,675	13,148,624	41.89
15–64	8,612,026	8,341,824	16,953,850	54.00
65+	530,004	712,521	1,242,525	3.96

Structure of the population (25.10.1970):

Age group	Male	Female	Total	Percent
Total	18,006,986	17,598,190	35,605,176	100
0–4	2,661,100	2,594,036	5,255,136	14.76
5–9	2,610,278	2,483,174	5,093,452	14.31
10–14	2,362,928	2,166,671	4,529,599	12.72
15–19	1,924,259	1,770,241	3,694,500	10.38
20–24	1,496,314	1,355,157	2,851,471	8.01
25–29	1,107,968	1,153,644	2,261,612	6.35
30–34	1,018,964	1,165,395	2,184,359	6.14
35–39	1,117,152	1,096,974	2,214,126	6.22
40–44	921,299	899,719	1,821,018	5.11
45–49	644,629	564,005	1,208,634	3.39
50–54	457,007	516,198	973,205	2.73
55–59	496,977	440,483	937,460	2.63
60–64	476,373	529,806	1,006,179	2.83
65–69	321,562	319,282	640,844	1.80
70–74	220,832	265,442	486,274	1.37
75–79	82,070	109,591	191,661	0.54
80–84	48.152	90.847	138.999	0.39
85+	35,191	72,727	107,918	0.30
Unknown	3,931	4,798	8,729	0.02

Age group	Male	Female	Total	Percent
0–14	7,634,306	7,243,881	14,878,187	41.79
15–64	9,660,942	9,491,622	19,152,564	53.79
65+	707,807	857,889	1,565,696	4.40

Structure of the population (26.10.1975):

Age group	Male	Female	Total	Percent
Total	20,744,730	19,602,989	40,347,719	100
0–4	2,917,451	2,783,798	5,701,249	14.13
5–9	2,759,820	2,620,295	5,380,115	13.34
10–14	2,800,002	2,448,837	5,248,839	13.00
15–19	2,232,561	2,031,938	4,264,499	10.57
20–24	1,857,634	1,674,510	3,532,144	8.75
25–29	1,486,652	1,346,030	2,832,682	7.02
30–34	1,178,669	1,116,102	2,294,771	5.69
35–39	1,040,829	1,098,730	2,139,559	5.30
40–44	1,091,915	1,054,284	2,146,199	5.32
45–49	881,215	802,470	1,683,685	4.17
50–54	676,681	664,996	1,341,677	3.33
55–59	382,853	384,295	767,148	1.90
60–64	535,532	548,341	1,083,873	2.69
65–69	322,443	356,949	679,392	1.68
70–74	275,674	320,062	595,736	1.48
75–79	119,728	138,791	258,519	0.64
80–84	79,297	110,363	189,660	0.47
85+	53,510	76,434	129,944	0.32
Unknown	52,264	25,764	78,028	0.20

Age group	Male	Female	Total	Percent
0–14	8,477,273	7,852,930	16,330,203	40.47
15–64	11,364,541	10,721,696	22,086,237	54.74
65+	850,652	1,002,599	1,853,251	4.59

Structure of the population (12.10.1980):

Age group	Male	Female	Total	Percent
Total	22,695,362	22,041,595	44,736,957	100
0–4	3,050,769	2,909,854	5,960,623	13.32
5–9	3,062,668	2,907,808	5,970,476	13.35
10–14	2,869,879	2,632,934	5,502,813	12.30
15–19	2,562,865	2,404,442	4,967,307	11.10
20–24	2,073,844	1,975,835	4,049,679	9.05
25–29	1,719,161	1,656,165	3,375,326	7.54
30–34	1,373,541	1,321,174	2,694,715	6.02
35–39	1,078,798	1,119,283	2,198,081	4.91
40–44	988,818	1,068,128	2,056,946	4.60
45–49	1,043,459	964,296	2,007,755	4.49
50–54	862,109	867,151	1,729,260	3.87
55–59	592,130	558,498	1,150,628	2.58
60–64	375,309	417,352	792,661	1.77
65–69	413,324	450,580	863,904	1.93
70–74	264,433	328,480	592,913	1.33
75–79	161,282	187,299	348,581	0.78
80–84	81,037	119,321	200,358	0.45
85+	35,284	72,207	107,491	0.24
Unknown	86,652	80,788	167,440	0.37

Age group	Male	Female	Total	Percent
0–14	8,983,316	8,450,596	17,433,912	38.97
15–64	12,670,034	12,352,324	25,022,358	55.93
65+	955,360	1,157,887	2,113,247	4.73

Structure of the population (20.10.1985):

Age group	Male	Female	Total	Percent
Total	25,671,975	24,992,483	50,664,458	100
0–4	3,112,524	2,964,677	6,077,201	12.00
5–9	3,457,223	3,282,238	6,739,461	13.30
10–14	3,210,697	2,982,779	6,193,476	12.22
15–19	2,744,581	2,662,883	5,407,464	10.67
20–24	2,434,052	2,350,428	4,784,480	9.44
25–29	2,056,187	1,984,575	4,040,762	7.98
30–34	1,723,904	1,650,502	3,374,406	6.66
35–39	1,413,596	1,372,975	2,786,571	5.50
40–44	1,098,217	1,109,939	2,208,156	4.36
45–49	991,442	1,017,167	2,008,609	3.96
50–54	1,039,158	1,003,434	2,042,592	4.03
55–59	824,436	824,633	1,649,069	3.26
60–64	555,813	574,373	1,130,186	2.23
65–69	309,858	367,530	677,388	1.34
70–74	314,528	352,481	667,009	1.32
75–79	175,769	218,753	394,522	0.78
80–84	99,310	138,700	238,010	0.47
85+	55,577	93,402	148,979	0.29
Unknown	55,103	41,014	96,117	0.19

Age group	Male	Female	Total	Percent
0–14	9,780,444	9,229,694	19,010,138	37.52
15–64	14,881,386	14,550,909	29,432,295	58.09
65+	955,042	1,170,866	2,125,908	4.20

Structure of the population (21.10.1990):

Age group	Male	Female	Total	Percent
Total	28,607,047	27,865,988	56,473,035	100
0–4	3,052,255	2,902,489	5,954,744	10.54
5–9	3,541,409	3,357,800	6,899,209	12.22
10–14	3,560,900	3,330,499	6,891,399	12.20
15–19	3,165,061	3,051,408	6,216,469	11.00
20–24	2,581,153	2,514,351	5,095,504	9.02
25–29	2,435,765	2,377,362	4,813,127	8.52
30–34	2,096,899	1,989,410	4,086,309	7.24
35–39	1,784,121	1,705,943	3,490,064	6.18
40–44	1,418,784	1,369,640	2,788,424	4.94
45–49	1,111,113	1,090,046	2,201,159	3.90
50–54	980,115	1,038,853	2,018,968	3.58
55–59	993,402	947,119	1,940,521	3.44
60–64	768,547	846,746	1,615,293	2.86
65–69	471,479	521,608	993,087	1.76
70–74	242,572	303,519	546,091	0.97
75–79	204,665	236,259	440,924	0.78
80–84	105,386	156,938	262,324	0.46
85+	67,040	107,897	174,937	0.31
Unknown	26,381	18,101	44,482	0.08

Age group	Male	Female	Total	Percent
0–14	10,154,564	9,590,788	19,745,352	34.96
15–64	17,334,960	16,930,878	34,265,838	60.68
65+	1,091,142	1,326,221	2,417,363	4.28

Structure of the population (22.10.2000):

Age group	Male	Female	Total	Percent
Total	34,346,735	33,457,192	67,803,927	100
0–4	3,396,690	3,188,132	6,584,822	9.71
5–9	3,485,746	3,270,871	6,756,617	9.97
10–14	3,570,657	3,307,999	6,878,656	10.15
15–19	3,691,218	3,518,257	7,209,475	10.63
20–24	3,426,714	3,263,432	6,690,146	9.87
25–29	2,976,430	2,918,825	5,895,255	8.70
30–34	2,552,370	2,457,285	5,009,655	7.39
35–39	2,453,579	2,400,808	4,854,387	7.16
40–44	2,083,531	1,985,225	4,068,756	6.00
45–49	1,710,757	1,658,012	3,368,769	4.97
50–54	1,356,391	1,360,958	2,717,349	4.00
55–59	1,016,254	1,042,168	2,058,422	3.04
60–64	864,299	964,989	1,829,288	2.70
65–69	794,881	850,636	1,645,517	2.43
70–74	517,870	654,773	1,172,643	1.73
75–79	254,443	323,154	577,597	0.85
80–84	98,797	147,895	246,692	0.36
85+	83,572	132,928	216,500	0.32
Unknown	12,536	10,845	23,381	0.03

Age group	Male	Female	Total	Percent
0–14	10,453,093	9,767,002	20,220,095	29.83
15–64	22,131,543	21,569,959	43,701,502	64.45
65+	1,749,563	2,109,386	3,858,949	5.69

Structure of the population (31.12.2007):

Age group	Male	Female	Total	Percent
Total	35,376,533	35,209,723	70,586,256	100
0–4	2,978,972	2,814,934	5,793,906	8.21
5–9	3,303,329	3,133,498	6,436,827	9.12
10–14	3,288,472	3,123,186	6,411,658	9.08
15–19	3,159,723	2,997,310	6,157,033	8.72
20–24	3,181,804	3,058,769	6,240,573	8.84
25–29	3,295,102	3,217,736	6,512,838	9.23
30–34	2,885,151	2,842,548	5,727,699	8.11
35–39	2,565,112	2,507,329	5,072,441	7.19
40–44	2,379,314	2,346,486	4,725,800	6.69
45–49	2,057,626	2,027,439	4,085,065	5.79
50–54	1,781,029	1,784,640	3,565,669	5.06
55–59	1,369,618	1,419,240	2,788,858	3.95
60–64	981,178	1,086,536	2,067,714	2.93
65–69	781,165	917,418	1,698,583	2.41
70–74	629,241	743,836	1,373,077	1.94
75–79	441,289	628,672	1,069,961	1.51
80–84	212,383	366,496	578,879	0.82
85–89	58,552	123,636	182,188	0.26
90+	27,473	70,014	97,487	0.14

Age group	Male	Female	Total	Percent
0–14	9,570,773	9,071,618	18,642,391	26.41
15–64	23,655,657	23,288,033	46,943,690	66,51
65+	2,150,103	2,850,072	5,000,175	7.08

Structure of the population (31.12.2008):

Age group	Male	Female	Total	Percent
Total	35,901,154	35,615,946	71,517,100	100
0–4	3,082,338	2,915,920	5,998,258	8.39
5–9	3,242,581	3,075,551	6,318,132	8.83
10–14	3,322,041	3,150,156	6,472,197	9.05
15–19	3,171,917	3,013,187	6,185,104	8.65
20–24	3,187,625	3,068,933	6,256,558	8.75
25–29	3,300,291	3,218,546	6,518,837	9.12
30–34	2,939,518	2,870,589	5,810,107	8.12
35–39	2,680,941	2,649,543	5,330,484	7.45
40–44	2,397,706	2,342,544	4,740,250	6.63
45–49	2,153,427	2,130,748	4,284,175	5.99
50–54	1,824,582	1,818,591	3,643,173	5.09
55–59	1,423,445	1,454,659	2,878,104	4.03
60–64	1,035,261	1,153,037	2,188,298	3.06
65–69	783,680	917,704	1,701,384	2.38
70–74	575,433	699,248	1,274,681	1.78
75–79	492,226	618,556	1,110,782	1.55
80–84	213,336	357,843	571,179	0.80
85–89	59,076	116,145	175,221	0.25
90+	15,730	44,446	60,176	0.08

Age group	Male	Female	Total	Percent
0–14	9,646,960	9,141,627	18,788,587	26.27
15–64	24,114,713	23,720,377	47,835,090	66.89
65+	2,139,481	2,753,942	4,893,423	6.84

Structure of the population (31.12.2009):

Age group	Male	Female	Total	Percent
Total	36,462,470	36,098,842	72,561,312	100
0–4	3,161,153	2,994,168	6,155,321	8.48
5–9	3,183,784	3,017,863	6,201,647	8.55
10–14	3,336,975	3,165,391	6,502,366	8.96
15–19	3,197,293	3,037,327	6,234,620	8.59
20–24	3,204,748	3,075,369	6,280,117	8.65
25–29	3,306,767	3,202,093	6,508,860	8.97
30–34	2,998,464	2,912,568	5,911,032	8.15
35–39	2,764,856	2,740,457	5,505,313	7.59
40–44	2,379,230	2,296,915	4,676,145	6.44
45–49	2,241,542	2,228,411	4,469,953	6.16
50–54	1,878,374	1,847,369	3,725,743	5.14
55–59	1,461,936	1,483,667	2,945,603	4.06
60–64	1,124,584	1,236,594	2,361,178	3.25
65–69	803,062	920,652	1,723,714	2.38
70–74	586,824	736,844	1,323,668	1.83
75–79	516,617	629,315	1,145,932	1.58
80–84	228,954	382,749	611,703	0.84
85–89	70,842	140,725	211,567	0.29
90+	16,465	50,365	66,830	0.09

Age group	Male	Female	Total	Percent
0–14	9,681,912	9,177,422	18,859,334	25.99
15–64	24,557,794	24,060,770	48,618,564	67.00
65+	2,222,764	2,860,650	5,083,414	7.01

Structure of the population (31.12.2010):

Age group	Male	Female	Total	Percent
Total	37,043,182	36,679,806	73,722,988	100
0–4	3,173,092	3,005,631	6,178,723	8.38
5–9	3,148,210	2,982,908	6,131,118	8.32
10–14	3,369,995	3,198,746	6,568,741	8.91
15–19	3,219,221	3,058,086	6,277,307	8.51
20–24	3,200,959	3,066,828	6,267,787	8.50
25–29	3,275,153	3,162,769	6,437,922	8.73
30–34	3,146,214	3,063,753	6,209,967	8.42
35–39	2,798,870	2,767,247	5,566,117	7.55
40–44	2,344,747	2,249,976	4,594,723	6.23
45–49	2,358,913	2,341,378	4,700,291	6.38
50–54	1,871,231	1,835,058	3,706,289	5.03
55–59	1,614,971	1,649,342	3,264,313	4.43
60–64	1,190,577	1,301,377	2,491,954	3.38
65–69	848,726	958,566	1,807,292	2.45
70–74	633,016	787,768	1,420,784	1.93
75–79	502,175	615,872	1,118,047	1.52
80–84	245,975	418,326	664,301	0.90
85–89	83,179	161,183	244,362	0.33
90+	17,958	54,992	72,950	0.10

Age group	Male	Female	Total	Percent
0–14	9,691,297	9,187,285	18,878,582	25.61
15–64	25,020,856	24,495,814	49,516,670	67.16
65+	2,331,029	2,996,707	5,327,736	7.23

Structure of the population (31.12.2011):

Age group	Male	Female	Total	Percent
Total	37,532,954	37,191,315	74,724,269	100
0–4	3,184,160	3,015,664	6,199,824	8.30
5–9	3,123,697	2,960,449	6,084,146	8.14
10–14	3,386,882	3,215,723	6,602,605	8.84
15–19	3,240,196	3,077,387	6,317,583	8.45
20–24	3,173,618	3,050,973	6,224,591	8.33
25–29	3,210,343	3,095,890	6,306,233	8.44
30–34	3,285,387	3,210,247	6,495,634	8.69
35–39	2,837,182	2,795,560	5,632,742	7.54
40–44	2,430,841	2,339,933	4,770,774	6.38
45–49	2,405,435	2,380,649	4,786,084	6.41
50–54	1,909,912	1,882,524	3,792,436	5.08
55–59	1,716,102	1,738,313	3,454,415	4.62
60–64	1,231,274	1,335,213	2,566,487	3.43
65–69	876,489	991,686	1,868,175	2.50
70–74	649,739	801,629	1,451,368	1.94
75–79	497,023	621,287	1,118,310	1.50
80–84	260,355	428,485	688,840	0.92
85–89	94,160	190,434	284,594	0.38
90+	20,159	59,269	79,428	0.11

Age group	Male	Female	Total	Percent
0–14	9,694,739	9,191,836	18,886,575	25.28
15–64	25,440,290	24,906,689	50,346,979	67.37
65+	2,397,925	3,092,790	5,490,715	7.35

Structure of the population (31.12.2012):

Age group	Male	Female	Total	Percent
Total	37,956,168	37,671,216	75,627,384	100
0–4	3,182,650	3,016,307	6,198,957	8.20
5–9	3,161,223	2,997,741	6,158,964	8.14
10–14	3,334,509	3,164,749	6,499,258	8.59
15–19	3,286,864	3,118,688	6,405,552	8.47
20–24	3,151,253	3,034,836	6,186,089	8.18
25–29	3,185,423	3,085,255	6,270,678	8.29
30–34	3,307,333	3,237,594	6,544,927	8.65
35–39	2,890,170	2,841,007	5,731,177	7.58
40–44	2,565,499	2,498,561	5,064,060	6.70
45–49	2,368,340	2,331,081	4,699,421	6.21
50–54	2,029,218	2,009,980	4,039,198	5.34
55–59	1,727,004	1,751,578	3,478,582	4.60
60–64	1,292,769	1,375,749	2,668,518	3.53
65–69	899,831	1,028,555	1,928,386	2.55
70–74	671,942	828,184	1,500,126	1.98
75–79	484,634	617,492	1,102,126	1.45
80–84	289,054	456,612	745,666	0.99
85–89	105,608	210,382	315.990	0.42
90+	22,844	66,865	89.709	0.12

Age group	Male	Female	Total	Percent
0–14	9,678,382	9,178,797	18,857,179	24.93
15–64	25,803,873	25,284,329	51,088,202	67.56
65+	2,473,913	3,208,090	5,682,003	7.51

Structure of the population (31.12.2013):

Age group	Male	Female	Total	Percent
Total	38,473,360	38,194,504	76,667,864	100
0–4	3,187,259	3,019,156	6,206,415	8.10
5–9	3,218,411	3,052,823	6,271,234	8.18
10–14	3,269,578	3,102,587	6,372,165	8.31
15–19	3,327,238	3,150,484	6,477,722	8.45
20–24	3,166,104	3,047,920	6,214,024	8.10
25–29	3,189,167	3,097,165	6,286,332	8.20
30–34	3,305,734	3,237,935	6,543,669	8.54
35–39	2,946,289	2,879,860	5,826,149	7.60
40–44	2,673,800	2,634,460	5,308,260	6.92
45–49	2,389,852	2,331,911	4,721,763	6.16
50–54	2,123,029	2,109,763	4,232,792	5.52
55–59	1,769,399	1,785,786	3,555,185	4.64
60–64	1,346,426	1,414,034	2,760,460	3.60
65–69	950,337	1,095,061	2,045,398	2.67
70–74	674,943	832,785	1,507,728	1.97
75–79	461,225	616,070	1,077,295	1.41
80–84	335,943	484,663	820,606	1.07
85–89	112,700	228,962	341,662	0.45
90+	25,926	73,079	99,005	0.13

Age group	Male	Female	Total	Percent
0–14	9,675,248	9,174,566	18,849,814	24.59
15–64	26,237,038	25,689,318	51,926,356	67.73
65+	2,561,074	3,330,620	5,891,694	7.68

Structure of the population (31.12.2014):

Age group	Male	Female	Total	Percent
Total	38,984,302	38,711,602	77,695,904	100
0–4	3,231,903	3,062,630	6,294,533	8.10
5–9	3,241,355	3,074,273	6,315,628	8.13
10–14	3,209,897	3,042,372	6,252,269	8.05
15–19	3,349,081	3,169,840	6,518,921	8.39
20–24	3,191,641	3,071,819	6,263,460	8.06
25–29	3,179,412	3,093,790	6,273,202	8.07
30–34	3,294,389	3,221,905	6,516,294	8.39
35–39	2,996,001	2,922,335	5,918,336	7.61
40–44	2,766,305	2,744,032	5,510,337	7.09
45–49	2,375,494	2,298,768	4,674,262	6.02
50–54	2,218,311	2,220,111	4,438,422	5.71
55–59	1,828,486	1,828,077	3,656,563	4.70
60–64	1,402,604	1,468,111	2,870,715	3.69
65–69	1,030,716	1,184,988	2,215,704	2.85
70–74	699,604	857,631	1,557,235	2.00
75–79	465,081	639,097	1,104,178	1.42
80–84	353,906	486,504	840,410	1.08
85–89	119,892	240,266	360,158	0.46
90+	30,224	85,053	106,585	0.11

Age group	Male	Female	Total	Percent
0–14	9,683,155	9,179,275	18,862,430	24.28
15–64	26,601,724	26,038,788	52,640,512	67.75
65+	2,699,423	3,493,539	6,192,962	7.97

Structure of the population (31.12.2015) (Data based on Address Based Population Registration System.):

Age group	Male	Female	Total	Percent
Total	39,511,191	39,229,862	78,741,053	100
0–4	3,275,520	3,105,996	6,381,516	8.10
5–9	3,252,811	3,084,908	6,337,719	8.05
10–14	3,166,860	3,000,125	6,166,985	7.83
15–19	3,382,363	3,203,137	6,585,500	8.36
20–24	3,224,168	3,089,999	6,314,167	8.02
25–29	3,178,350	3,084,899	6,263,249	7.95
30–34	3,252,171	3,175,879	6,428,150	8.16
35–39	3,134,041	3,069,282	6,203,323	7.88
40–44	2,788,425	2,764,155	5,552,580	7.05
45–49	2,337,087	2,252,992	4,590,079	5.83
50–54	2,317,534	2,315,375	4,632,909	5.88
55–59	1,843,354	1,837,816	3,681,170	4.68
60–64	1,515,065	1,593,402	3,108,467	3.95
65–69	1,100,734	1,255,651	2,356,385	2.99
70–74	737,892	888,292	1,626,184	2.07
75–79	501,411	682,335	1,183,746	1.50
80–84	339,904	470,584	810,488	1.03
85–89	128,879	261,571	390,450	0.50
90+	34,622	93,364	127,986	0.16

Age group	Male	Female	Total	Percent
0–14	9,695,191	9,191,029	18,886,220	23.99
15–64	26,972,558	26,387,036	53,359,594	67.77
65+	2,843,442	3,651,797	6,495,239	8.25

Structure of the population (31.12.2016):

Age group	Male	Female	Total	Percent
Total	40,043,650	39,771,221	79,814,871	100
0–4	3,314,542	3,144,753	6,459,295	8.09
5–9	3,253,345	3,084,099	6,337,444	7.94
10–14	3,147,133	2,981,910	6,129,043	7.68
15–19	3,400,443	3,222,876	6,623,319	8.30
20–24	3,247,764	3,117,959	6,365,723	7.98
25–29	3,169,360	3,076,681	6,246,041	7.83
30–34	3,196,645	3,113,766	6,310,411	7.91
35–39	3,275,175	3,219,158	6,494,333	8.14
40–44	2,833,655	2,800,662	5,634,317	7.06
45–49	2,412,875	2,335,639	4,748,514	5.95
50–54	2,381,640	2,374,604	4,756,244	5.96
55–59	1,855,171	1,860,565	3,715,736	4.66
60–64	1,636,510	1,706,438	3,342,948	4.19
65–69	1,132,464	1,280,073	2,412,537	3.02
70–74	763,121	917,371	1,680,492	2.11
75–79	512,607	689,443	1,202,050	1.51
80–84	336,206	473,119	809,325	1.01
85–89	136,238	265,520	401,758	0.50
90+	38,756	106,585	145,341	0.18

Age group	Male	Female	Total	Percent
0–14	9,715,020	9,210,762	18,925,782	23.71
15–64	27,409,238	26,828,348	54,237,586	67.95
65+	2,919,392	3,732,111	6,651,503	8.33

Structure of the population (31.12.2017):

Age group	Male	Female	Total	Percent
Total	40,535,135	40,275,390	80,810,525	100
0–4	3,326,591	3,155,258	6,481,849	8.02
5–9	3,254,177	3,086,592	6,340,769	7.85
10–14	3,188,333	3,022,537	6,210,870	7.69
15–19	3,351,043	3,175,544	6,526,587	8.08
20–24	3,294,336	3,162,174	6,456,510	7.99
25–29	3,163,889	3,067,653	6,231,542	7.71
30–34	3,189,075	3,107,849	6,296,924	7.79
35–39	3,308,413	3,252,283	6,560,696	8.12
40–44	2,891,799	2,849,020	5,740,819	7.10
45–49	2,556,364	2,498,790	5,055,154	6.26
50–54	2,349,139	2,326,316	4,675,455	5.79
55–59	1,977,328	1,989,399	3,966,727	4.91
60–64	1,651,215	1,720,023	3,371,238	4.17
65–69	1,188,986	1,322,918	2,511,904	3.11
70–74	784,614	952,653	1,737,267	2.15
75–79	533,757	715,428	1,249,185	1.55
80–84	330,240	471,436	801,676	0.99
85–89	152,317	282,516	434,833	0.54
90+	43,519	117,001	160,520	0.20

Age group	Male	Female	Total	Percent
0–14	9,769,101	9,264,387	19,033,488	23.55
15–64	27,732,601	27,149,051	54,881,652	67.91
65+	3,033,433	3,861,952	6,895,385	8.53

Structure of the population (31.12.2018):

Age group	Male	Female	Total	Percent
Total	41,139,980	40,863,902	82,003,882	100
0–4	3,327,780	3,157,206	6,484,986	7.91
5–9	3,264,608	3,094,412	6,358,920	7.75
10–14	3,254,277	3,086,146	6,340,423	7.73
15–19	3,299,449	3,124,818	6,424,267	7.83
20–24	3,347,297	3,199,832	6,547,129	7.98
25–29	3,190,023	3,086,446	6,276,469	7.65
30–34	3,205,205	3,127,948	6,333,153	7.72
35–39	3,316,603	3,259,469	6,576,072	8.02
40–44	2,953,329	2,892,697	5,846,026	7.13
45–49	2,670,183	2,640,524	5,310,707	6.48
50–54	2,372,182	2,329,142	4,701,324	5.73
55–59	2,076,882	2,095,459	4,172,341	5.09
60–64	1,692,130	1,753,731	3,445,861	4.20
65–69	1,245,979	1,366,228	2,612,207	3.19
70–74	835,353	1,021,569	1,856,922	2.26
75–79	539,825	722,725	1,262,550	1.54
80–84	318,882	474,854	793,736	0.97
85–89	182,957	302,957	485,914	0.59
90+	47,136	127,739	174,875	0.21

Age group	Male	Female	Total	Percent
0–14	9,846,565	9,337,764	19,184,329	23.39
15–64	28,123,283	27,510,066	55,633,349	67.84
65+	3,170,132	4,016,072	7,186,204	8.76

Structure of the population (31.12.2019):

Age group	Male	Female	Total	Percent
Total	41,721,136	41,433,861	83,154,997	100
0–4	3,254,719	3,090,417	6,345,136	7.63
5–9	3,316,621	3,144,418	6,461,039	7.77
10–14	3,288,207	3,117,963	6,406,170	7.70
15–19	3,254,891	3,076,703	6,331,594	7.61
20–24	3,392,374	3,231,704	6,624,078	7.97
25–29	3,240,657	3,126,654	6,367,311	7.66
30–34	3,221,381	3,141,636	6,363,017	7.65
35–39	3,324,759	3,260,084	6,584,843	7.92
40–44	3,016,898	2,950,486	5,967,384	7.18
45–49	2,772,838	2,760,721	5,533,559	6.65
50–54	2,367,577	2,307,796	4,675,373	5.62
55–59	2,178,454	2,211,543	4,389,997	5.28
60–64	1,754,500	1,800,269	3,554,769	4.27
65–69	1,301,371	1,421,301	2,722,672	3.27
70–74	907,850	1,109,063	2,016,913	2.43
75–79	560,695	747,604	1,308,299	1.57
80–84	323,732	493,998	817,730	0.98
85–89	192,938	304,472	497,410	0.60
90+	50,674	137,029	187,703	0.23

Age group	Male	Female	Total	Percent
0–14	9,859,547	9,352,798	19,212,345	23.10
15–64	28,524,329	27,867,596	56,391,925	67.82
65+	3,337,260	4,213,467	7,550,727	9.08

Population Estimates by Sex and Age Group (31.12.2020):

Age group	Male	Female	Total	Percent
Total	41,915,985	41,698,377	83,614,362	100
0–4	3,140,172	2,981,535	6,121,707	7.32
5–9	3,349,253	3,177,340	6,526,593	7.81
10–14	3,294,985	3,124,952	6,419,937	7.68
15–19	3,201,588	3,028,526	6,230,114	7.45
20–24	3,408,434	3,255,202	6,663,636	7.97
25–29	3,240,543	3,130,411	6,370,954	7.62
30–34	3,199,710	3,119,184	6,318,894	7.56
35–39	3,270,512	3,203,071	6,473,583	7.74
40–44	3,145,645	3,089,465	6,235,110	7.46
45–49	2,788,035	2,775,631	5,563,666	6.65
50–54	2,325,190	2,259,442	4,584,632	5.48
55–59	2,273,088	2,304,499	4,577,587	5.47
60–64	1,764,938	1,809,456	3,574,394	4.27
65–69	1,399,052	1,539,663	2,938,715	3.51
70–74	960,742	1,170,963	2,131,705	2.55
75–79	583,671	771,675	1,355,346	1.62
80–84	339,767	521,432	861,199	1.03
85–89	177,532	289,216	466,748	0.56
90+	53,128	146,714	199,842	0.24
Age group	Male	Female	Total	Percent
0–14	9,784,410	9,283,827	19,068,237	22.80
15–64	28,617,683	27,974,887	56,592,570	67.68
65+	3,513,892	4,439,663	7,953,555	9.51

Population Estimates by Sex and Age Group (31.12.2021):

Age group	Male	Female	Total	Percent
Total	42,428,101	42,252,172	84,680,273	100
0–4	3,033,029	2,880,580	5,913,609	6.98
5–9	3,398,812	3,225,390	6,624,202	7.82
10–14	3,304,851	3,133,301	6,438,152	7.60
15–19	3,203,519	3,026,190	6,229,709	7.36
20–24	3,445,410	3,296,170	6,741,580	7.96
25–29	3,296,919	3,179,980	6,476,899	7.65
30–34	3,212,668	3,129,119	6,341,787	7.49
35–39	3,228,063	3,158,145	6,386,208	7.54
40–44	3,294,071	3,253,091	6,547,162	7.73
45–49	2,838,766	2,823,495	5,662,261	6.69
50–54	2,403,726	2,350,758	4,754,484	5.61
55–59	2,337,304	2,369,876	4,707,180	5.56
60–64	1,776,254	1,835,662	3,611 916	4.27
65–69	1,508,990	1,647,458	3,156,448	3.73
70–74	982,573	1,192,451	2,175,024	2.57
75–79	598,307	794,411	1,392,718	1.64
80–84	340,568	520,841	861,409	1.02
85–89	169,807	286,741	456,548	0.54
90+	54,464	148,513	202,977	0.24
Age group	Male	Female	Total	Percent
0–14	9,736,692	9,239,271	18,975,963	22.41
15–64	29,036,700	28,422,486	57,459,186	67.85
65+	3,654,709	4,590,415	8,245,124	9.74

Population Estimates by Sex and Age Group (31.12.2022):

Age group	Male	Female	Total	Percent
Total	42,704,112	42,575,441	85,279,553	100
0–4	2,904,379	2,759,241	5,663,620	6.64
5–9	3,404,972	3,230,105	6,635,077	7.78
10–14	3,303,371	3,133,043	6,436,414	7.55
15–19	3,244,500	3,070,609	6,315,109	7.41
20–24	3,388,724	3,245,984	6,634,708	7.78
25–29	3,334,439	3,218,730	6,553,169	7.68
30–34	3,199,028	3,116,019	6,315,047	7.41
35–39	3,215,451	3,151,290	6,366,741	7.47
40–44	3,321,873	3,284,156	6,606,029	7.75
45–49	2,893,831	2,869,703	5,763,534	6.76
50–54	2,543,588	2,511,036	5,054,624	5.93
55–59	2,305,846	2,321,295	4,627,141	5.53
60–64	1,893,862	1,962,809	3,856,671	4.52
65–69	1,523,412	1,661,877	3,185,289	3.74
70–74	1,031,897	1,232,222	2,264,119	2.65
75–79	617,021	827,777	1,444,798	1.69
80–84	353,290	540,167	893,457	1.05
85–89	165,676	284,407	450,083	0.53
90+	58,952	154,971	213,923	0.25
Age group	Male	Female	Total	Percent
0–14	9,612,722	9,122,389	18,735,111	21.97
15–64	29,341,142	28,751,631	58,092,773	68.12
65+	3,750,248	4,701,421	8,451,669	9.91

Population Estimates by Sex and Age Group (31.12.2023):

Age group	Male	Female	Total	Percent
Total	42,734,071	42,638,306	85,372,377	100
0–4	2,741,873	2,606,181	5,348,054	6.26
5–9	3,368,825	3,197,661	6,566,486	7.69
10–14	3,283,764	3,113,329	6,397,093	7.49
15–19	3,283,511	3,113,008	6,396,519	7.49
20–24	3,317,007	3,158,513	6,475,520	7.59
25–29	3,330,851	3,212,210	6,543,061	7.66
30–34	3,172,482	3,094,683	6,267,165	7.34
35–39	3,190,762	3,138,484	6,329,246	7.41
40–44	3,298,682	3,265,956	6,564,638	7.69
45–49	2,932,767	2,894,024	5,826,791	6.83
50–54	2,637,680	2,634,986	5,272,666	6.18
55–59	2,315,313	2,311,209	4,626,522	5.42
60–64	1,980,198	2,055,612	4,035,810	4.73
65–69	1,554,059	1,686,354	3,240,413	3.80
70–74	1,077,788	1,267,553	2,345,341	2.75
75–79	656,329	886,599	1,542,928	1.81
80–84	357,820	546,603	904,423	1.06
85–89	163,397	288,413	451,810	0.53
90+	70,963	166,928	237,891	0.28
Age group	Male	Female	Total	Percent
0–14	9,394,462	8,917,171	18,311,633	21.45
15–64	29,459,253	28,878,685	58,337,938	68.33
65+	3,880,356	4,842,450	8,722,806	10.22

Population Estimates by Sex and Age Group (31.12.2024):

Age group	Male	Female	Total	Percent
Total	42,853,110	42,811,834	85,664,944	100
0–4	2,606,763	2,475,623	5,082,386	5.93
5–9	3,274,360	3,110,725	6,385,085	7.45
10–14	3,314,979	3,144,115	6,459,094	7.54
15–19	3,298,654	3,129,876	6,428,530	7.50
20–24	3,235,130	3,099,499	6,334,629	7.39
25–29	3,336,548	3,218,069	6,554,617	7.65
30–34	3,182,620	3,105,980	6,288,600	7.34
35–39	3,174,570	3,125,998	6,300,568	7.35
40–44	3,282,536	3,245,656	6,528,192	7.62
45–49	2,979,015	2,933,900	5,912,915	6.90
50–54	2,726,368	2,739,014	5,465,382	6.38
55–59	2,301,684	2,277,880	4,579,564	5.35
60–64	2,072,512	2,160,572	4,223,084	4.93
65–69	1,608,416	1,725,547	3,333,963	3.89
70–74	1,124,799	1,316,670	2,441,469	2.85
75–79	716,554	964,063	1,680,617	1.96
80–84	374,066	568,407	942,473	1.10
85–89	167,988	300,951	468,939	0.55
90+	75,548	169,289	244,837	0.29
Age group	Male	Female	Total	Percent
0–14	9,196,102	8,730,463	17,926,565	20.92
15–64	29,589,637	29,036,444	58,626,081	68.44
65+	4,067,371	5,044,927	9,112,298	10.64

Population Estimates by Sex and Age Group (31.12.2025):

Age group	Male	Female	Total	Percent
Total	43,059,434	43,032,734	86,092,168	100
0–4	2,491,429	2,365,131	4,856,560	5.64
5–9	3,156,806	2,999,106	6,155,912	7.15
10–14	3,344,303	3,173,948	6,518,251	7.57
15–19	3,303,829	3,135,824	6,439,653	7.48
20–24	3,206,123	3,062,572	6,268,695	7.28
25–29	3,372,727	3,247,662	6,620,389	7.69
30–34	3,197,919	3,116,930	6,314,849	7.33
35–39	3,163,880	3,111,320	6,275,200	7.29
40–44	3,235,535	3,196,649	6,432,184	7.47
45–49	3,116,569	3,077,564	6,194,133	7.20
50–54	2,747,715	2,758,433	5,506,148	6.40
55–59	2,265,962	2,234,278	4,500,240	5.23
60–64	2,171,547	2,255,348	4,426,895	5.14
65–69	1,629,718	1,741,051	3,370,769	3.92
70–74	1,224,255	1,435,020	2,659,275	3.09
75–79	772,763	1,028,765	1,801,528	2.09
80–84	402,550	599,348	1,001,898	1.16
85–89	182,013	323,863	505,876	0.59
90+	73,791	169,922	243,713	0.28
Age group	Male	Female	Total	Percent
0–14	8,992,538	8,538,185	17,530,723	20.36
15–64	29,781,806	29,196,580	58,978,386	68.51
65+	4,285,090	5,297,969	9,583,059	11.13

== Vital statistics ==
Birth statistics of Turkey from 2001 onward are from the Central Population Administrative System (MERNIS) database which is available online. Birth statistics are updated continually because MERNIS has dynamic structure. Death statistics from MERNIS are available as of 2009. Mortality data prior to 2009 are incomplete.

In 2025 Turkey had a crude birth rate of 10.4 per 1000 down from 20.3 in 2001. The total fertility rate (TFR) in 2025 was 1.42 children per woman down from 2.38 in 2001, The crude birth rate in 2025 ranged from 8.2 per 1,000 in West Marmara (TFR 1.25) (6.4;1.23 in 2025), similar to neighbouring Greece, to 18.4 per 1,000 in Southeast Anatolia (TFR 2.34) (23.5; 2.66 in 2025), similar to neighbouring Syria. Similarly, in 2025, the TFR ranged from 1.09 in Bartın, to 3.15 in Şanlıurfa.

=== Turkey demographic table ===
	Population	Live births	Deaths	Natural change	Crude birth rate (per 1000)	Crude death rate (per 1000)	Natural change rate (per 1000)	Crude migration rate (per 1000)	Total fertility rate (TFR)
1980	44,736,957	1,106,652	130,062	976,590	24.7				3.41
1985	50,664,458	985,917	141,324	844,593	19.5				2.59
1990	56,473,035	1,179,795	150,292	1,029,503	20.9				2.65
2000	67,803,927	1,434,297	174,315	1,259,982	21.6	7.3	14.3		2.53
2001		1,323,341	175,137	1,148,204	20.3	6.9	13.4		2.38
2002		1,229,555	175,434	1,054,121	18.6	6.6	12.0		2.17
2003		1,198,927	184,330	1,014,597	17.9	6.3	11.6		2.09
2004		1,222,484	187,086	1,035,398	18.1	6.1	12.0		2.11
2005		1,244,041	197,520	1,046,521	18.2	5.9	12.3		2.12
2006		1,255,432	210,146	1,045,286	18.1	5.7	12.4		2.12
2007	70,586,256	1,289,992	212,731	1,077,261	18.4	5.6	12.8		2.16
2008	71,517,100	1,295,511	215,562	1,079,949	18.2	5.5	12.7		2.15
2009	72,561,312	1,266,751	369,703	897,048	17.6	5.1	12.5	2.0	2.10
2010	73,722,988	1,261,169	366,471	894,698	17.2	5.0	12.2	3.6	2.08
2011	74,724,269	1,252,812	376,162	876,650	16.9	5.1	11.8	1.7	2.05
2012	75,627,384	1,294,605	376,520	918,085	17.2	5.0	12.2	−0.2	2.11
2013	76,667,864	1,297,505	373,041	924,464	17.0	4.9	12.1	1.5	2.11
2014	77,695,904	1,351,088	391,091	959,997	17.5	5.1	12.4	0.9	2.19
2015	78,741,053	1,336,908	405,528	931,380	17.1	5.2	11.9	1.5	2.16
2016	79,814,871	1,316,204	422,964	893,240	16.6	5.3	11.3	2.3	2.11
2017	80,810,525	1,300,258	426,857	873,401	16.2	5.3	10.9	1.5	2.08
2018	82,003,882	1,257,071	426,785	830,286	15.4	5.2	10.2	4.4	2.00
2019	83,154,997	1,191,709	436,624	755,085	14.4	5.3	9.1	4.8	1.89
2020	83,614,362	1,120,430	509,147	611,283	13.4	6.1	7.3	−1.8	1.77
2021	84,680,273	1,086,136	566,745	519,391	12.9	6.7	6.2	6.5	1.71
2022	85,279,553	1,041,846	505,540	536,306	12.3	5.9	6.4	0.7	1.63
2023	85,372,377	963,075	526,534	436,541	11.3	6.2	5.1	−4.0	1.52
2024	85,664,944	940,273	489,734	450,539	11.0	5.7	5.3	−1.8	1.49
2025	86,092,168	895,374	491,684	403,690	10.4	5.7	4.7	0.5	1.42

=== Current vital statistics ===
Period	Live births	Deaths	Natural increase
January—July 2025	510,669	295,263	+215,406
January—July 2026	501,051	284,491	+216,560
Difference	▼ –9,618 (−1.88%)	▼ -10,772 (-3.65%)	▲ +1,154

=== Demographic and health surveys ===
Fertility Rate (TFR) (Wanted Fertility Rate) and CBR (Crude Birth Rate):

Year	CBR (Total)	TFR (Total)	CBR (Urban)	TFR (Urban)	CBR (Rural)	TFR (Rural)
1993	22.9	2.7 (1.8)	21.7	2.4 (1.7)	24.0	3.1 (2.0)
1998	23.4	2.61 (1.9)	22.8	2.39 (1.9)	24.7	3.08 (2.1)

=== Fertility ===
==== Government initiatives ====
Turkish president Recep Tayyip Erdoğan has long been vocal about his desire for Turks to have more children. He has urged people to have at least four or five children. Turkey's birthrate peaked in 2014 and has since fallen below the replacement level of 2.1, reaching an all-time low of 1.42 in 2025. Demographers attribute this decline to the common, worldwide factors of urbanization, changing lifestyles, and the increased access to higher education, especially for women and phones. They also cite the ongoing Turkish economic crisis, which has caused persistently high inflation and low wages, as a reason for the decline because these factors make housing, childcare, and other necessities difficult to afford.

In an effort to reverse the declining fertility rate, the Turkish government declared 2025 the "Year of the Family", and the subsequent decade the "Decade of Family and Population". As part of this initiative, the government has extended parental leave for mothers and fathers, introduced payments for families with new children, and offered interest-free loans to young couples. However, parents have found these supports to be inadequate. For example, one mother noted that the monthly stipend only covers the cost of diapers. Demographers have also questioned the effectiveness of these initiatives, noting that younger generations prefer the ideal of one child and two incomes. Erdoğan's push for women to have more children stems from his conservative Islamic vision for Turkish society. He has also said that for women, "Career is having children".

==== Before 1950 ====
No historic registry data regarding fertility are available. Our world in data gives an estimate af around 7 before 1950

==== Regions ====
Total fertility rate by region in Turkey by Turkish General Census (GNS) and Turkish population and health research (TNSA).

	South-East	East	Mediterranean	Black Sea	Central	Aegean	Marmara	Turkey
TNSA 1978	–	6.31	3.77	4.99	4.26	–	2.89	4.33
GNS 1980	4.61	▼4.64	▼3.50	▼3.65	▼3.76	2.81	▼2.73	▼3.41
TNSA 1993	–	▼4.40	▼2.37	▼3.15	▼2.44	–	▼2.03	▼2.65
TNSA 1998	–	▼4.19	▲2.55	▼2.68	▲2.56	–	2.03	▼2.61
GNS 2000	▼4.31	▼3.72	▼2.43	▼2.28	▼2.29	▼1.96	▼1.88	▼2.53
TNSA 2003	–	▼3.65	▼2.30	▼1.94	▼1.86	–	1.88	▼2.23

Fertility rate in Turkey as per GNS (2000) for Rural, Urban and Metropolitan areas.

	South-East	East	Mediterranean	Black Sea	Central	Aegean	Marmara	Turkey
GNS rural 2000	4.80	4.52	2.52	2.56	2.91	2.23	2.03	2.87
GNS urban 2000	4.05	3.08	2.38	2.01	2.05	1.80	1.85	2.20
GNS metropolitan 2000	3.81	2.34	2.41	1.87	1.89	1.60	1.83	2.03

=== UN estimates ===
The 2018 figures from the UN Department of Economic and Social Affairs:

Period	Live births per year	Deaths per year	Natural change per year	CBR (Note: CBR = crude birth rate (per 1000); CDR = crude death rate (per 1000); NC = natural change (per 1000); TFR = total fertility rate (number of children per woman); IMR = infant mortality rate per 1000 births)	CDR	NC	TFR	IMR
1950–1955	1,127,000	551,000	677,000	48.4	18.8	29.6	6.69	167.4
1955–1960	1,216,000	564,000	752,000	46.9	18.4	28.5	6.5	163.9
1960–1965	1,277,000	547,000	799,000	44.3	17.6	26.7	6.2	160.5
1965–1970	1,343,000	527,000	792,000	40.3	16.7	23.6	5.80	156.9
1970–1975	1,451,000	523,000	887,000	38.7	15.0	23.7	5.39	141.3
1975–1980	1,497,000	505,000	977,000	36.4	13.0	23.4	4.69	119.4
1980–1985	1,527,000	481,000	1,074,000	33.8	10.8	23.0	4.11	96.7
1985–1990	1,431,000	454,000	976,000	27.7	8.8	18.9	3.39	78.0
1990–1995	1,375,000	438,000	987,000	25.1	7.7	17.4	3.11	63.0
1995–2000	1,389,000	418,000	983,000	22.8	6.9	15.9	2.76	45.5
2000–2005	1,345,000	404,000	923,000	20.5	6.2	14.3	2.50	31.4
2005–2010	1,309,000	415,000	932,000	18.7	5.9	12.8	2.27	24.0
2010–2015	1,302,000	439,000	914,000	17.3	5.8	11.5	2.15	13.0
2015–2020	1,281,000	473,000	808,000	15.8	5.8	10.0	2.10	
2020–2025	1,242,000	509,000	733,000	14.6	6.0	8.6	2.04	
2025–2030	1,191,000	543,000	648,000	13.6	6.2	7.4	2.01	

=== Life expectancy ===
Life expectancy at birth in Turkey since 1937

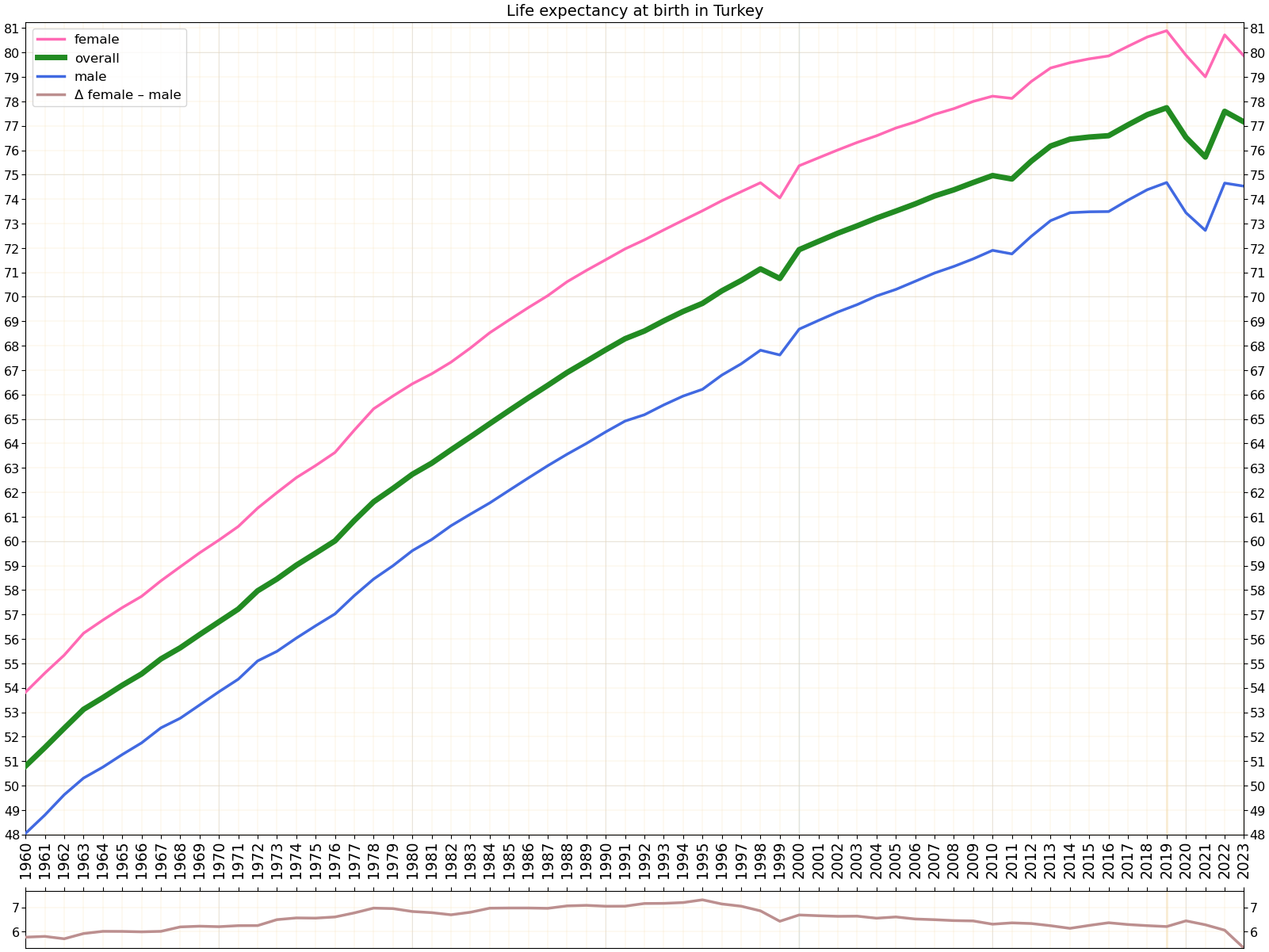
Life expectancy in Turkey by gender since 1960

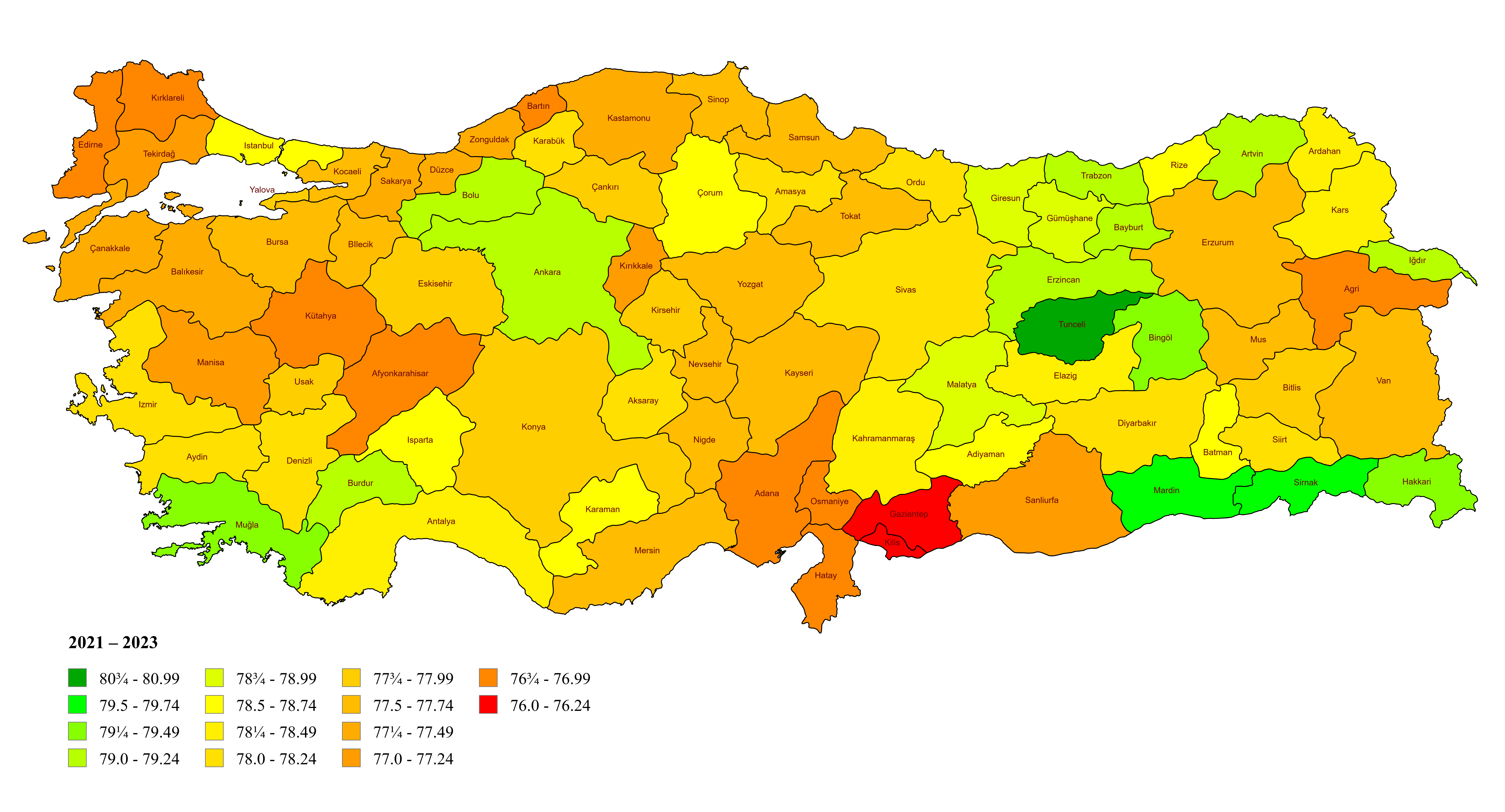
Life expectancy in Turkish provinces in 2021-2023

Life expectancy in Turkey according to the UN
Period	Life expectancy in Years	Period	Life expectancy in Years
1950–1955	41.01	1985–1990	63.04
1955–1960	43.69	1990–1995	65.49
1960–1965	47.22	1995–2000	68.49
1965–1970	50.78	2000–2005	71.37
1970–1975	53.75	2005–2010	73.37
1975–1980	57.05	2010–2015	74.83
1980–1985	60.22	2015–2020	77.31

==== by regions ====
region	2019				2019 →2021	2021	2021 →2022	2022				2019 →2022
region	overall	male	female	F Δ M	2019 →2021	overall	2021 →2022	overall	male	female	F Δ M	2019 →2022
Turkey on average	77.83	74.68	80.95	6.27	−1.80	76.03	2.45	78.48	75.38	81.50	6.12	0.65
East Black Sea Region	79.33	75.62	82.90	7.28	−1.84	77.49	2.49	79.98	76.33	83.45	7.12	0.65
West Anatolia Region	78.33	75.15	81.40	6.25	−1.81	76.52	2.46	78.98	75.85	81.95	6.10	0.65
Istanbul Region	78.25	75.04	81.32	6.28	−1.81	76.44	2.45	78.89	75.74	81.86	6.12	0.64
Central East Anatolia Region	77.88	74.93	80.83	5.90	−1.80	76.08	2.44	78.52	75.63	81.37	5.74	0.64
Mediterranean Region	77.77	74.88	80.69	5.81	−1.80	75.97	2.44	78.41	75.58	81.23	5.65	0.64
West Black Sea Region	77.77	74.60	81.06	6.46	−1.80	75.97	2.44	78.41	75.30	81.60	6.30	0.64
Central Anatolia Region	77.60	74.61	80.57	5.96	−1.80	75.80	2.44	78.24	75.31	81.11	5.80	0.64
Aegean Region	77.56	74.35	80.83	6.48	−1.79	75.77	2.43	78.20	75.04	81.37	6.33	0.64
Northeast Anatolia Region	77.50	74.54	80.63	6.09	−1.79	75.71	2.43	78.14	75.24	81.17	5.93	0.64
East Marmara Region	77.46	74.45	80.47	6.02	−1.79	75.67	2.43	78.10	75.15	81.01	5.86	0.64
Southeast Anatolia Region	77.44	74.10	80.64	6.54	−1.79	75.65	2.43	78.08	74.79	81.18	6.39	0.64
West Marmara Region	77.11	73.77	80.57	6.80	−1.78	75.33	2.42	77.75	74.46	81.11	6.65	0.64

Data source: Global Data Lab

=== Regional data ===
==== Birth and death rates ====
Birth and Death Rate by Region and Year

Birth Rate by Region and Year (Note: All data taken from Turkish Statistical Institute (TurkStat). Data is for xxxx-12-31.)
Region	Population (2025)	Birth Rate (TFR)/2025	Birth Rate (TFR)/2024	Birth Rate (TFR)/2023	Birth Rate (TFR)/2022	Birth Rate (TFR)/2021	Birth Rate (TFR)/2020	Birth Rate (TFR)/2019	Birth Rate (TFR)/2018	Birth Rate (TFR)/2017	Birth Rate (TFR)/2016	Birth Rate (TFR)/2015	Birth Rate (TFR)/2014	Birth Rate (TFR)/2013	Birth Rate (TFR)/2012	Birth Rate (TFR)/2011	Birth Rate (TFR)/2010	Birth Rate (TFR)/2009
Turkey	86 092 168	10.4 (1.42)	11.0 (1.49)	11.3 (1.52)	12.3 (1.63)	12.9 (1.71)	13.4 (1.77)	14.4 (1.89)	15.4 (2.00)	16.2 (2.08)	16.6 (2.11)	17.1 (2.16)	17.5 (2.19)	17.0 (2.11)	17.2 (2.11)	16.9 (2.05)	17.2 (2.08)	17.6 (2.10)
İstanbul	15 754 053	9.3 (1.14)	9.9 (1.20)	10.0 (1.21)	10.8 (1.30)	11.6 (1.39)	12.5 (1.49)	13.6 (1.61)	14.8 (1.73)	15.6 (1.80)	16.3 (1.86)	16.7 (1.88)	17.0 (1.89)	16.4 (1.81)	16.5 (1.80)	15.9 (1.72)	16.3 (1.77)	16.4 (1.77)
West Marmara	3 868 967	8.2 (1.25)	8.7 (1.32)	9.0 (1.36)	9.4 (1.41)	9.6 (1.43)	10.1 (1.50)	10.7 (1.57)	11.5 (1.67)	11.8 (1.70)	11.9 (1.69)	12.0 (1.69)	12.1 (1.69)	11.9 (1.64)	11.9 (1.63)	11.6 (1.57)	11.5 (1.54)	11.7 (1.54)
Aegean	11 011 261	8.2 (1.22)	8.7 (1.29)	9.2 (1.34)	9.9 (1.41)	10.2 (1.45)	10.7 (1.50)	11.4 (1.58)	12.2 (1.68)	12.9 (1.75)	13.2 (1.76)	13.6 (1.80)	13.8 (1.80)	13.4 (1.73)	13.7 (1.74)	13.2 (1.66)	13.3 (1.66)	13.7 (1.69)
East Marmara	8 759 256	9.7 (1.32)	10.0 (1.36)	10.5 (1.41)	11.1 (1.48)	11.8 (1.56)	12.2 (1.61)	13.2 (1.72)	14.2 (1.84)	14.6 (1.87)	15.0 (1.89)	15.2 (1.90)	15.3 (1.88)	14.8 (1.80)	15.0 (1.80)	14.5 (1.71)	14.8 (1.74)	15.2 (1.77)
West Anatolia	8 516 084	9.3 (1.23)	9.8 (1.28)	10.2 (1.34)	11.0 (1.43)	11.4 (1.48)	12.1 (1.55)	13.0 (1.66)	14.1 (1.78)	14.7 (1.84)	15.1 (1.87)	15.5 (1.90)	15.8 (1.91)	15.4 (1.85)	15.4 (1.83)	15.2 (1.79)	15.4 (1.80)	15.8 (1.83)
Mediterranean	11 028 175	10.3 (1.48)	10.9 (1.56)	11.1 (1.58)	12.3 (1.72)	12.8 (1.77)	13.4 (1.84)	14.3 (1.96)	15.4 (2.08)	16.3 (2.18)	17.0 (2.24)	17.5 (2.29)	18.0 (2.32)	17.6 (2.24)	17.8 (2.23)	17.3 (2.14)	17.8 (2.18)	18.3 (2.20)
Central Anatolia	4 164 985	9.4 (1.34)	10.2 (1.43)	10.5 (1.46)	11.4 (1.57)	11.8 (1.62)	12.4 (1.69)	13.2 (1.80)	14.1 (1.89)	14.9 (1.99)	15.4 (2.05)	15.8 (2.09)	16.4 (2.14)	16.0 (2.06)	16.3 (2.07)	16.4 (2.06)	16.7 (2.08)	17.6 (2.16)
West Black Sea	4 716 187	7.7 (1.21)	8.2 (1.27)	8.4 (1.28)	9.0 (1.36)	9.5 (1.42)	9.9 (1.47)	10.6 (1.57)	11.2 (1.63)	11.6 (1.67)	11.9 (1.69)	12.2 (1.73)	12.7 (1.77)	12.8 (1.76)	13.0 (1.77)	13.0 (1.74)	13.6 (1.79)	14.2 (1.84)
East Black Sea	2 699 769	8.0 (1.23)	8.4 (1.30)	8.9 (1.35)	9.4 (1.40)	9.8 (1.46)	10.3 (1.53)	11.0 (1.61)	11.6 (1.69)	12.0 (1.73)	12.3 (1.77)	12.5 (1.78)	12.8 (1.81)	12.8 (1.77)	13.0 (1.78)	13.1 (1.77)	13.6 (1.81)	14.1 (1.86)
Northeast Anatolia	2 115 281	12.5 (1.61)	13.1 (1.68)	13.7 (1.75)	15.1 (1.93)	16.5 (2.11)	17.1 (2.19)	18.4 (2.36)	19.1 (2.45)	20.6 (2.64)	21.2 (2.72)	21.7 (2.79)	22.7 (2.90)	22.4 (2.85)	22.8 (2.90)	22.9 (2.90)	23.4 (2.97)	23.1 (2.91)
Central East Anatolia	3 870 158	13.3 (1.69)	14.1 (1.79)	14.3 (1.82)	16.1 (2.02)	16.9 (2.12)	17.8 (2.23)	19.3 (2.43)	20.0 (2.52)	21.1 (2.65)	21.2 (2.67)	21.9 (2.75)	23.0 (2.87)	22.6 (2.82)	22.5 (2.82)	22.9 (2.85)	23.6 (2.95)	23.9 (3.00)
Southeast Anatolia	9 587 992	18.4 (2.34)	19.2 (2.44)	19.4 (2.46)	21.5 (2.72)	22.7 (2.87)	22.6 (2.85)	23.9 (3.03)	25.5 (3.23)	26.6 (3.36)	26.7 (3.38)	27.8 (3.52)	28.7 (3.63)	27.6 (3.48)	28.0 (3.53)	27.7 (3.48)	28.2 (3.57)	28.3 (3.59)

Death Rate by Region and Year
Region	Population (2025)	Death Rate (2024)	Death Rate (2023)	Death Rate (2022)	Death Rate (2021)	Death Rate (2020)	Death Rate (2019)	Death Rate (2018)	Death Rate (2017)	Death Rate (2016)	Death Rate (2015)	Death Rate (2014)	Death Rate (2013)	Death Rate (2012)	Death Rate (2011)	Death Rate (2010)	Death Rate (2009)
Turkey	86 092 168	5.7	6.2	5.9	6.7	6.1	5.3	5.2	5.3	5.3	5.2	5.1	4.9	5.0	5.1	5.0	5.1
İstanbul	15 754 053	4.5	4.4	4.7	5.4	4.9	4.2	4.2	4.2	4.2	4.1	4.1	3.9	4.0	4.0	4.0	4.2
West Marmara	3 868 967	8.4	8.3	9.0	9.8	8.1	7.7	7.8	7.8	7.7	7.8	7.5	7.1	7.3	7.3	7.3	7.3
Aegean	11 011 261	7.3	7.1	7.7	8.2	7.5	6.7	6.6	6.6	6.6	6.4	6.1	5.9	6.2	6.2	5.9	6.0
East Marmara	8 759 256	6.1	5.9	6.4	7.3	6.3	5.6	5.7	5.7	5.7	5.7	5.5	5.4	5.5	5.5	5.5	5.6
West Anatolia	8 516 084	5.3	5.4	5.5	6.2	6.1	5.0	5.0	5.0	4.9	4.7	4.7	4.5	4.6	4.7	4.6	4.8
Mediterranean	11 028 175	5.6	8.5	5.7	6.5	5.8	5.0	4.9	4.9	5.0	4.8	4.6	4.5	4.5	4.5	4.5	4.5
Central Anatolia	4 164 985	6.5	6.3	6.7	7.8	7.1	5.9	5.9	6.1	6.1	5.9	5.8	5.5	5.5	5.7	5.5	5.7
West Black Sea	4 716 187	8.1	8.1	8.8	9.9	8.5	7.6	7.6	7.6	7.6	7.4	7.3	6.9	7.0	7.0	6.8	7.0
East Black Sea	2 699 769	7.8	7.6	8.7	9.6	8.0	7.2	7.0	7.3	7.0	6.9	6.8	6.3	6.5	6.5	6.2	6.4
Northeast Anatolia	2 115 281	5.1	4.9	5.2	6.1	5.7	4.9	5.0	5.0	5.0	5.0	4.9	4.8	5.0	5.4	5.0	5.1
Central East Anatolia	3 870 158	4.2	4.5	4.3	5.2	5.1	4.1	4.0	4.2	4.2	4.1	4.1	4.1	4.1	4.5	4.4	4.5
Southeast Anatolia	9 587 992	3.5	4.9	3.5	4.3	4.2	3.5	3.3	3.4	3.7	3.4	3.5	3.4	3.5	3.6	3.7	3.8

==== Regional births and deaths ====
Absolute Births and Deaths by Region and Year

Absolute Births by Region and Year
Province	Population (2025)	Births (2025)	Births (2024)	Births (2023)	Births (2022)	Births (2021)	Births (2020)	Births (2019)	Births (2018)	Births (2017)	Births (2016)	Births (2015)	Births (2014)	Births (2013)	Births (2012)	Births (2011)	Births (2010)	Births (2009)	Births (2008)	Births (2007)	Births (2006)	Births (2005)	Births (2004)	Births (2003)	Births (2002)	Births (2001)	Births (2000)	Births (1990)	Births (1985)	Births (1980)
Turkey	86 092 168	895,374	940,273	963,075	1,041,846	1,086,136	1,120,430	1,191,709	1,257,071	1,300,258	1,316,204	1,336,908	1,351,088	1,297,505	1,294,605	1,252,812	1,261,169	1,266,751	1,295,511	1,289,992	1,255,432	1,244,041	1,222,484	1,198,927	1,229,555	1,323,341	1,434,297	1,179,795	985,917	1,106,652
İstanbul	15 754 053	146,125	155,177	157,723	171,408	181,360	192,999	208,685	223,223	233,220	240,027	242,888	242,397	229,390	226,594	213,441	213,821	210,441	226,109	222,060	207,872	205,241	197,065	187,823	182,003	188,549	190,569	136,654	99,701	108,256
West Marmara	3 868 967	31,520	33,118	33,896	34,928	35,115	36,569	38,191	40,590	40,933	40,495	40,391	40,138	38,806	38,517	37,058	36,284	36,400	36,411	36,643	35,651	35,155	34,312	33,156	33,733	36,988	40,739	40,685	33,838	42,280
Tekirdağ	1 208 441	11,859	12,154	12,346	12,719	12,928	13,228	13,991	14,971	14,829	14,463	14,139	13,392	12,751	12,398	11,763	11,226	11,155	10,857	10,663	9,970	9,720	9,117	8,325	8,025	8,275	9,594	7,963	5,544	7,186
Edirne	422 438	3,050	3,351	3,357	3,550	3,512	3,613	3,639	3,910	3,980	4,076	4,253	4,066	4,196	4,271	4,112	3,979	4,110	4,651	4,587	4,482	4,390	4,279	4,085	4,078	4,736	4,994	6,005	5,689	6,711
Kırklareli	379 595	2,798	2,981	3,049	3,163	3,098	3,349	3,441	3,582	3,711	3,586	3,715	3,726	3,475	3,490	3,259	3,383	3,383	3,107	3,325	3,217	3,373	3,225	3,318	3,451	3,700	4,258	4,606	4,152	5,534
Balıkesir	1 284 517	9,584	10,215	10,476	10,897	10,880	11,450	11,908	12,609	12,898	12,930	12,914	13,465	13,099	12,938	12,695	12,715	12,535	12,980	13,308	13,307	13,162	13,265	13,040	13,577	15,241	16,103	15,844	13,251	15,484
Çanakkale	573 976	4,229	4,417	4,668	4,599	4,697	4,929	5,212	5,535	5,515	5,440	5,370	5,489	5,285	5,420	5,229	4,981	5,217	4,816	4,760	4,675	4,510	4,426	4,388	4,602	5,036	5,790	6,267	5,202	7,365
Aegean	11 011 261	90,155	95,746	100,736	106,786	109,797	113,735	120,198	127,652	132,868	134,176	137,187	137,438	132,299	133,419	127,833	128,112	129,927	135,479	135,506	129,660	127,627	124,388	119,110	120,964	133,182	153,782	135,270	109,981	130,742
İzmir	4 504 185	34,413	36,803	38,918	41,952	43,395	44,715	48,046	51,617	53,895	54,623	55,946	55,906	53,376	53,971	50,963	50,303	50,838	54,433	53,857	50,692	49,050	46,779	44,676	44,176	48,460	51,631	45,708	35,852	41,181
Aydın	1 172 107	9,777	10,262	10,730	11,344	11,661	11,900	12,678	13,425	14,104	13,702	13,820	13,632	13,219	13,544	12,632	12,803	12,971	13,069	12,814	12,599	12,195	12,041	11,427	12,021	13,468	15,938	14,088	12,116	13,504
Denizli	1 060 975	9,061	9,824	10,360	10,871	11,031	11,461	12,045	12,853	13,481	13,560	13,916	13,965	13,138	13,031	12,751	12,575	13,166	14,957	14,866	14,137	14,055	13,726	13,071	13,583	14,729	15,936	14,183	11,638	12,963
Muğla	1 099 547	8,596	8,646	8,959	9,278	9,654	10,021	10,281	10,858	11,122	11,302	11,413	11,295	11,018	11,176	10,661	10,784	10,743	10,850	10,958	10,417	10,097	9,690	9,474	9,302	10,075	11,260	9,381	7,629	8,806
Manisa	1 477 756	13,714	14,521	15,486	16,026	16,397	16,911	17,590	18,470	18,796	19,225	19,435	19,572	19,193	18,974	18,459	18,460	18,729	19,382	19,647	18,780	18,471	18,218	17,297	17,740	19,539	22,264	21,227	17,112	20,643
Afyonkarahisar	751 808	7,424	7,748	8,185	8,682	8,933	9,295	9,793	10,075	10,517	10,776	11,184	11,377	10,910	11,201	11,160	11,423	11,827	10,675	10,981	10,877	11,258	11,329	10,782	11,463	12,615	18,770	14,540	11,156	15,569
Kütahya	570 478	4,225	4,743	4,645	4,982	5,141	5,631	5,747	6,093	6,455	6,579	6,919	6,981	6,810	6,951	6,844	7,277	7,188	7,262	7,443	7,359	7,586	7,764	7,780	7,926	9,021	12,040	10,817	9,642	11,976
Uşak	374 405	2,945	3,199	3,453	3,651	3,585	3,801	4,068	4,261	4,498	4,409	4,554	4,710	4,635	4,571	4,363	4,487	4,465	4,851	4,940	4,799	4,915	4,841	4,603	4,753	5,275	5,943	5,326	4,836	6,100
East Marmara	8 759 256	84,310	86,581	89,448	93,673	97,781	100,109	106,173	112,197	113,462	113,585	112,635	111,115	105,761	105,203	99,704	100,386	100,928	101,848	99,483	93,125	90,140	88,121	85,016	87,245	95,562	100,858	83,098	68,201	82,368
Bursa	3 263 011	30,941	32,104	33,098	34,903	36,640	38,213	39,969	42,389	42,807	43,163	43,267	42,683	41,325	41,369	38,788	39,229	38,958	40,583	39,547	36,654	36,108	34,627	32,382	32,402	34,844	37,570	27,824	22,486	26,622
Eskişehir	927 956	7,250	7,352	7,838	8,427	8,745	8,801	9,209	9,802	10,094	9,945	10,004	10,026	9,437	9,306	8,811	8,757	8,830	10,068	9,730	9,628	9,362	8,971	9,034	9,287	10,089	10,623	10,833	10,215	11,837
Bilecik	228 995	2,004	2,185	2,226	2,252	2,296	2,346	2,526	2,628	2,651	2,700	2,656	2,740	2,706	2,669	2,479	2,544	2,606	1,562	1,797	1,950	2,087	2,102	2,029	1,974	2,334	2,977	2,825	2,627	3,104
Kocaeli	2 161 171	23,063	23,430	24,392	25,609	26,568	27,014	29,121	30,805	31,320	31,188	30,901	29,879	27,521	27,334	25,770	25,864	25,876	25,420	24,236	21,641	20,003	19,513	18,847	19,239	21,269	22,850	18,250	13,235	15,590
Sakarya	1 123 693	11,479	11,612	12,172	12,259	13,078	13,031	13,861	14,780	14,618	14,504	14,242	14,021	13,375	13,420	12,772	13,035	13,330	13,527	13,542	13,224	12,751	12,822	12,657	13,635	15,006	14,277	13,059	10,591	13,380
Düzce	415 622	3,980	4,193	4,199	4,419	4,465	4,774	5,083	5,197	5,273	5,317	5,119	5,223	5,144	4,956	4,999	4,979	5,058	4,858	5,033	4,728	4,547	4,649	4,812	5,328	5,997	5,794	–	–	–
Bolu	327 173	2,684	2,797	2,762	2,958	3,060	3,058	3,269	3,376	3,438	3,492	3,433	3,543	3,514	3,407	3,521	3,378	3,453	3,449	3,340	3,198	3,268	3,319	3,185	3,380	3,805	4,148	10,307	9,047	11,835
Yalova	311 635	2,909	2,908	2,761	2,846	2,929	2,872	3,125	3,220	3,261	3,276	3,013	3,000	2,739	2,742	2,564	2,600	2,817	2,381	2,258	2,102	2,014	2,118	2,070	2,000	2,218	2,619	–	–	–
West Anatolia	8 516 084	79,211	82,461	85,684	91,196	94,013	98,322	104,723	111,434	115,079	116,456	117,694	117,405	112,593	111,279	108,026	106,921	107,734	115,491	114,063	108,092	106,790	102,151	99,888	100,871	107,714	129,668	103,704	95,250	108,698
Ankara	5 910 320	50,416	52,284	54,454	58,067	60,244	63,834	68,684	73,270	75,902	76,388	77,368	76,659	72,976	71,596	69,262	68,271	68,342	74,868	73,016	68,190	66,184	62,542	61,830	61,395	64,635	70,749	61,900	59,065	68,097
Konya	2 343 409	26,325	27,491	28,346	30,082	30,656	31,182	32,606	34,597	35,392	36,229	36,472	37,025	35,797	35,990	35,138	35,024	35,386	36,986	37,390	36,396	36,793	35,926	34,718	35,563	38,802	53,418	36,885	36,185	40,601
Karaman	262 355	2,470	2,686	2,884	3,047	3,113	3,306	3,433	3,567	3,785	3,839	3,854	3,721	3,820	3,693	3,626	3,626	4,006	3,637	3,657	3,506	3,813	3,683	3,340	3,913	4,277	5,501	4,919	–	–
Mediterranean	11 028 175	113,397	118,618	121,853	134,919	138,492	142,845	151,165	159,781	166,815	171,561	174,874	177,272	170,686	169,985	163,817	166,123	167,506	173,576	170,512	165,986	162,685	155,983	153,491	154,160	168,391	189,480	151,932	125,978	129,129
Antalya	2 777 677	23,869	24,571	25,934	27,240	28,603	29,574	30,765	32,468	33,760	35,580	35,907	34,808	33,210	33,018	30,957	30,674	30,647	31,368	30,612	29,159	26,926	25,816	24,462	23,896	25,777	29,556	21,250	14,427	16,622
Isparta	445 303	3,603	3,820	4,094	4,279	4,397	4,475	4,772	4,958	5,352	5,191	5,232	5,377	5,321	5,379	5,268	5,388	5,754	6,270	6,104	5,946	5,792	5,703	5,614	5,848	6,315	8,355	6,869	6,168	7,078
Burdur	277 226	2,279	2,381	2,467	2,469	2,440	2,496	2,671	2,750	2,807	2,955	3,064	3,126	2,957	2,889	2,914	3,030	3,076	3,017	3,100	3,148	3,326	3,250	3,110	3,257	3,786	4,240	4,249	3,701	5,416
Adana	2 283 609	24,587	26,240	27,111	29,704	30,014	30,926	33,366	35,387	37,365	38,173	39,467	39,953	38,698	38,181	36,886	37,219	37,699	41,209	39,821	39,386	38,617	35,454	35,318	35,442	39,180	42,630	45,700	38,415	35,196
Mersin	1 956 428	19,125	20,498	20,969	22,644	23,047	23,587	24,635	26,751	27,465	28,158	28,515	29,124	27,961	28,139	26,775	27,291	27,119	27,778	27,297	26,377	26,451	25,483	24,881	24,818	27,279	33,460	26,970	20,068	21,397
Hatay	1 577 531	19,664	19,928	20,199	24,402	25,567	26,062	27,770	28,820	29,817	30,781	31,412	32,320	30,247	30,496	29,399	29,881	30,346	30,270	30,187	29,295	29,342	28,535	28,517	28,066	30,703	32,176	26,884	23,762	24,861
Kahramanmaraş	1 146 278	13,759	14,197	14,150	16,584	17,078	18,033	18,865	20,096	21,249	21,660	21,976	22,890	22,918	22,491	22,602	22,954	23,243	23,224	23,315	22,613	22,577	22,291	22,408	23,313	25,107	27,954	20,010	19,437	18,559
Osmaniye	564 123	6,511	6,983	6,929	7,597	7,346	7,692	8,321	8,551	9,000	9,063	9,301	9,674	9,374	9,392	9,016	9,686	9,622	10,440	10,076	10,062	9,654	9,451	9,181	9,520	10,244	11,109	–	–	–
Central Anatolia	4 164 985	39,327	42,544	43,407	47,020	48,465	50,505	53,929	56,569	58,933	60,381	61,569	63,446	61,669	62,634	62,989	64,216	67,174	67,033	68,239	68,476	68,020	67,929	67,222	71,697	79,713	92,958	81,108	72,250	80,043
Kırıkkale	282 830	2,156	2,376	2,366	2,520	2,655	2,803	3,088	3,191	3,328	3,299	3,340	3,345	3,320	3,260	3,361	3,672	3,877	4,087	4,262	4,215	4,134	4,398	4,704	5,228	5,977	7,431	6,667	–	–
Aksaray	441 136	4,809	5,363	5,557	5,989	6,029	6,179	6,361	6,714	6,786	6,755	6,862	7,071	6,965	7,045	7,262	7,387	7,616	7,019	7,100	7,354	7,224	6,779	6,668	7,266	8,054	9,674	7,637	–	–
Niğde	374 492	3,880	4,092	4,207	4,463	4,505	4,665	5,130	5,291	5,470	5,744	5,678	6,038	5,899	6,079	5,985	6,245	6,660	6,722	6,660	7,009	6,909	7,187	7,259	7,537	8,112	8,707	7,565	12,794	15,170
Nevşehir	320 150	3,035	3,203	3,229	3,491	3,581	3,656	3,712	3,908	4,062	4,144	4,179	4,474	4,226	4,308	4,280	4,402	4,707	3,520	3,695	3,816	4,020	4,301	4,392	4,804	5,067	6,745	5,687	5,899	6,928
Kırşehir	242 777	1,994	2,080	2,215	2,407	2,442	2,608	2,843	2,921	2,905	2,914	2,930	2,994	2,894	2,867	2,825	2,893	3,000	3,066	3,287	3,249	3,284	3,449	3,397	4,045	4,630	5,065	4,961	5,486	6,369
Kayseri	1 458 991	14,495	15,355	15,459	17,020	17,520	18,110	19,564	20,777	21,519	22,512	23,065	23,506	22,481	22,378	22,117	21,687	22,176	25,924	25,369	25,028	23,811	22,428	20,951	21,282	23,278	23,835	19,882	19,461	21,174
Sivas	631 401	5,528	6,108	6,304	6,704	7,167	7,598	8,089	8,285	8,954	9,073	9,225	9,432	9,359	9,740	9,861	10,182	10,547	10,091	10,727	10,463	10,766	10,860	11,320	12,138	13,584	16,177	15,673	17,065	17,607
Yozgat	413 208	3,435	3,967	4,070	4,426	4,566	4,886	5,142	5,482	5,909	5,940	6,290	6,586	6,525	6,957	7,298	7,748	8,591	6,604	7,139	7,342	7,872	8,527	8,531	9,397	11,011	15,324	13,036	11,545	12,795
West Black Sea	4 716 187	36,434	38,698	39,376	41,967	43,970	45,831	49,629	51,719	52,779	53,722	54,995	57,099	57,369	58,377	58,511	61,393	63,972	63,456	64,389	63,668	65,659	68,199	69,885	76,942	86,266	97,317	102,553	98,681	123,940
Zonguldak	585 203	3,879	4,095	4,112	4,380	4,756	5,042	5,494	5,836	6,195	6,379	6,753	7,123	7,323	7,709	7,781	8,319	8,839	8,845	8,755	8,061	8,405	8,620	8,754	9,435	10,683	10,499	20,471	21,201	29,169
Karabük	249 614	1,829	1,944	1,931	2,098	2,263	2,187	2,346	2,459	2,486	2,365	2,506	2,477	2,520	2,425	2,554	2,557	2,713	2,981	2,992	2,994	3,070	3,019	2,960	3,140	3,633	3,714	–	–	–
Bartın	206 663	1,410	1,472	1,482	1,656	1,646	1,813	1,883	1,965	1,927	2,065	2,129	2,300	2,159	2,085	2,275	2,409	2,434	2,418	2,382	2,276	2,271	2,506	2,551	3,080	3,373	3,372	–	–	–
Kastamonu	379 934	2,907	3,062	3,009	3,263	3,262	3,352	3,571	3,759	3,713	3,944	4,027	3,931	4,177	4,222	4,159	4,350	4,473	4,105	4,495	4,479	4,578	4,771	4,891	5,318	5,934	5,987	7,916	7,837	10,692
Çankırı	200 549	1,660	1,803	1,879	1,965	2,156	2,125	2,278	2,265	2,186	2,234	2,170	2,358	2,289	2,296	2,356	2,462	2,532	1,967	1,984	2,068	2,093	2,024	1,994	2,466	2,864	4,680	5,402	5,212	6,982
Sinop	225 848	1,630	1,720	1,746	1,872	1,955	2,089	2,204	2,183	2,251	2,232	2,262	2,380	2,342	2,474	2,436	2,512	2,652	2,179	2,150	2,242	2,500	2,785	2,910	3,207	3,541	3,791	5,931	6,275	7,599
Samsun	1 392 403	11,720	12,576	12,588	13,259	13,789	14,495	15,719	16,622	16,894	17,001	17,227	17,559	17,415	17,569	17,244	17,898	18,605	19,440	19,542	19,022	19,382	20,333	20,862	22,681	25,159	26,050	25,782	23,427	27,713
Tokat	614 141	4,788	5,128	5,367	5,611	5,774	6,039	6,686	6,802	6,963	7,122	7,300	7,782	8,002	8,059	8,347	9,053	9,401	9,214	9,553	9,525	10,087	10,361	10,742	11,833	13,494	19,623	15,870	15,713	16,155
Çorum	519 590	3,931	4,275	4,428	4,870	5,224	5,479	5,930	6,164	6,360	6,644	6,662	7,278	7,109	7,489	7,318	7,636	7,972	8,007	8,164	8,714	8,719	9,108	9,430	10,429	11,652	12,935	14,220	12,647	16,169
Amasya	342 242	2,680	2,623	2,834	2,993	3,145	3,210	3,518	3,664	3,804	3,736	3,959	3,911	4,033	4,049	4,041	4,197	4,351	4,300	4,372	4,287	4,554	4,672	4,791	5,353	5,933	6,666	6,961	6,369	9,461
East Black Sea	2 699 769	21,514	22,980	24,013	25,199	26,277	27,727	29,658	31,024	31,556	32,092	32,144	32,817	32,558	32,774	32,836	34,272	35,565	34,101	34,534	34,157	34,216	36,354	38,340	42,090	46,843	59,019	54,769	56,357	66,438
Trabzon	823 323	6,991	7,298	7,775	8,103	8,700	8,896	9,612	10,243	10,299	10,418	10,453	10,414	10,189	10,380	10,454	10,839	11,189	11,373	11,278	11,026	11,227	11,765	11,940	12,779	14,028	16,754	14,078	14,299	16,763
Ordu	768 087	6,059	6,465	6,631	7,072	7,129	7,728	8,351	8,639	8,994	9,087	8,987	9,386	9,429	9,517	9,499	10,057	10,464	10,161	10,094	10,016	9,741	10,559	11,349	13,015	14,284	19,976	16,619	14,095	16,202
Giresun	455 074	3,132	3,473	3,630	3,760	3,825	4,031	4,265	4,448	4,477	4,456	4,623	4,715	4,696	4,796	4,836	5,179	5,261	4,704	4,896	4,875	4,984	5,388	5,918	6,448	7,157	8,881	9,402	9,750	12,635
Rize	346 947	2,924	3,058	3,262	3,283	3,592	3,686	3,924	4,156	4,061	4,175	4,206	4,275	4,346	4,215	4,289	4,360	4,526	4,804	4,864	4,795	4,638	4,849	4,919	5,316	6,023	6,242	6,803	6,613	8,852
Artvin	167 531	1,306	1,366	1,411	1,523	1,536	1,759	1,799	1,843	1,917	1,997	1,987	2,070	2,021	2,062	1,937	2,006	2,057	1,432	1,657	1,700	1,898	2,040	2,135	2,346	2,681	3,204	4,149	4,639	5,309
Gümüşhane	138 807	1,102	1,320	1,304	1,438	1,495	1,627	1,707	1,695	1,808	1,959	1,888	1,957	1,877	1,804	1,821	1,831	2,068	1,627	1,745	1,745	1,728	1,753	2,079	2,186	2,670	3,962	3,718	6,961	6,677
Northeast Anatolia	2 115 281	26,534	28,144	29,560	32,773	36,052	37,608	40,651	41,932	45,262	46,609	47,720	49,996	49,605	50,781	50,779	51,578	50,778	47,677	49,640	51,435	52,908	54,722	56,050	59,391	63,135	66,930	55,361	52,459	59,162
Erzurum	736 877	8,471	9,016	9,776	10,575	11,541	12,063	12,980	13,568	14,654	14,903	15,265	15,982	15,692	16,045	16,087	15,979	16,153	15,972	16,738	17,107	17,936	19,174	19,154	20,278	21,637	24,243	20,122	20,718	22,093
Erzincan	239 625	2,265	2,371	2,402	2,486	2,767	2,642	2,853	2,871	2,995	3,217	3,092	3,119	3,213	3,132	3,179	3,034	3,023	2,928	3,084	3,103	3,084	3,172	3,213	3,682	3,924	5,928	4,610	5,469	7,187
Bayburt	82 836	746	822	849	896	991	1,018	1,043	1,105	1,145	1,211	1,235	1,272	1,213	1,287	1,212	1,310	1,361	1,170	1,258	1,251	1,385	1,427	1,422	1,690	1,762	2,347	2,320	–	–
Ağrı	491 489	8,227	8,792	9,067	10,476	11,631	12,379	13,466	13,755	15,152	15,590	15,987	16,822	16,657	17,123	17,058	17,574	16,775	15,196	15,764	16,627	16,427	16,984	17,674	18,784	19,563	17,698	13,152	10,050	10,370
Kars	268 991	3,358	3,477	3,646	4,091	4,404	4,732	5,079	5,258	5,681	5,853	6,069	6,449	6,519	6,989	6,952	7,359	7,146	6,695	6,836	7,105	7,535	7,471	7,541	7,681	8,474	9,005	15,157	16,222	19,512
Iğdır	205 071	2,589	2,727	2,875	3,179	3,499	3,585	3,937	4,056	4,220	4,428	4,532	4,718	4,715	4,515	4,540	4,556	4,413	4,105	4,209	4,238	4,318	4,352	4,793	4,808	4,933	4,909	–	–	–
Ardahan	90 392	878	939	945	1,070	1,219	1,189	1,293	1,319	1,415	1,407	1,540	1,634	1,596	1,690	1,751	1,766	1,907	1,611	1,751	2,004	2,223	2,142	2,253	2,468	2,842	2,800	–	–	–
Central East Anatolia	3 870 158	51,360	54,643	56,086	63,158	66,544	70,147	75,817	77,904	81,133	81,298	83,682	87,027	84,963	84,018	84,344	86,055	86,812	84,725	86,348	87,951	88,721	92,235	90,526	94,643	100,609	103,527	83,728	70,290	75,411
Malatya	755 854	7,265	7,451	7,502	9,168	9,502	9,706	10,595	11,204	11,769	11,752	12,006	12,328	11,933	12,217	12,190	12,475	12,731	13,535	13,565	13,453	13,979	13,744	13,284	14,052	15,592	17,688	13,451	13,905	14,185
Elazığ	605 678	5,856	6,193	6,237	6,624	7,015	7,601	8,006	8,384	8,776	8,839	8,996	9,300	8,873	9,103	9,215	9,253	9,490	10,002	10,069	9,978	9,606	9,949	9,548	10,283	11,008	11,819	9,904	8,488	11,475
Bingöl	282 299	3,446	3,738	3,883	4,248	4,690	4,992	5,339	5,537	5,486	5,515	5,486	5,931	5,594	5,565	5,552	5,609	5,583	5,059	5,351	5,379	5,922	6,231	5,365	5,784	6,674	6,413	7,094	6,313	7,373
Tunceli	85 083	728	767	789	833	891	934	1,031	1,000	931	976	1,078	1,028	953	918	901	874	950	487	497	555	610	561	665	786	1,042	1,207	2,581	3,635	4,272
Van	1 112 013	17,620	18,772	19,345	21,959	22,687	24,654	26,895	27,315	28,682	28,824	29,832	30,755	30,710	29,217	29,526	30,302	30,342	29,577	29,584	30,199	29,428	31,705	30,713	31,782	33,258	33,668	21,112	15,752	14,637
Muş	389 127	6,259	7,121	7,253	8,287	9,184	9,406	10,320	10,521	11,090	10,952	11,259	12,024	11,558	11,845	11,696	12,199	12,051	11,305	11,685	12,336	12,653	12,826	13,643	14,097	14,404	11,651	11,563	8,112	9,886
Bitlis	360 423	5,974	6,280	6,454	7,171	7,641	7,694	8,165	8,429	8,752	8,798	9,038	9,148	8,975	9,015	8,992	9,261	9,395	8,601	9,004	9,194	9,320	9,972	9,866	10,775	11,203	12,116	11,161	8,514	9,184
Hakkâri	282 299	4,212	4,321	4,623	4,868	4,934	5,160	5,466	5,514	5,647	5,642	5,987	6,513	6,367	6,138	6,272	6,082	6,270	6,159	6,593	6,857	7,203	7,247	7,442	7,084	7,428	8,965	6,862	5,571	4,399
Southeast Anatolia	9 587 992	175,487	181,563	181,293	198,819	208,270	204,033	212,890	223,029	228,218	225,802	231,129	234,938	221,806	221,024	213,474	212,008	209,514	209,605	208,575	209,359	206,879	201,025	198,420	205,816	216,389	207,810	149,333	102,931	100,185
Gaziantep	2 222 415	34,393	36,015	35,449	39,975	41,084	40,458	42,319	45,388	46,316	47,487	48,815	49,307	46,694	45,640	43,273	42,658	42,944	46,194	44,423	41,777	40,458	37,339	35,288	33,717	36,163	39,705	29,403	24,301	23,233
Adıyaman	617 821	8,348	8,544	8,647	10,403	11,032	11,065	11,918	12,566	13,056	12,958	13,413	13,681	13,071	13,415	13,404	13,532	13,415	12,931	12,942	13,291	13,656	13,055	13,864	14,438	16,022	16,616	14,825	9,407	12,351
Kilis	157 363	2,312	2,533	2,492	2,699	2,720	2,704	2,805	2,944	2,899	2,883	3,005	3,100	2,867	2,844	2,748	2,911	2,815	2,475	2,662	2,840	2,813	2,837	2,811	3,153	3,406	3,060	–	–	–
Şanlıurfa	2 265 800	53,916	55,601	54,761	59,316	62,317	59,571	61,064	63,468	64,747	63,490	62,745	63,395	59,931	59,237	57,166	56,007	54,420	53,536	52,903	53,540	52,010	50,140	50,336	51,739	53,224	44,749	26,443	16,609	14,708
Diyarbakır	1.852 356	31,571	32,384	32,592	35,527	37,236	37,016	39,871	41,784	43,562	42,942	43,582	44,259	41,729	42,117	40,880	40,207	39,398	39,927	39,474	38,949	39,174	39,330	38,238	40,141	42,141	42,494	32,099	22,766	20,690
Mardin	903 576	16,109	16,746	17,083	18,490	19,545	19,023	20,148	20,645	20,945	20,617	21,677	22,050	20,439	20,946	19,889	20,239	20,005	19,144	19,365	20,253	21,155	21,110	20,523	22,599	23,878	22,254	17,712	15,737	16,736
Batman	662 626	10,940	11,446	11,590	12,464	13,213	12,963	13,426	14,026	14,453	14,233	14,529	14,908	14,196	14,080	13,769	13,903	13,686	14,089	14,136	14,223	14,626	14,167	14,598	15,527	16,324	15,442	11,550	–	–
Şırnak	573 666	12,072	12,314	12,520	13,194	13,876	13,590	13,710	14,102	13,940	12,786	14,791	15,144	14,415	14,019	13,601	13,633	13,862	12,821	13,877	15,089	13,413	13,651	12,963	14,146	14,284	13,857	8,546	–	–
Siirt	332 369	5,826	5,980	6,159	6,751	7,247	7,643	7,629	8,106	8,300	8,406	8,572	9,094	8,464	8,726	8,744	8,918	8,969	8,488	8,793	9,397	9,574	9,396	9,799	10,356	10,947	9,633	8,755	14,111	12,467

Absolute Deaths by Region and Year
Province	Population (2025)	Deaths (2025)	Deaths (2024)	Deaths (2023)	Deaths (2022)	Deaths (2021)	Deaths (2020)	Deaths (2019)	Deaths (2018)	Deaths (2017)	Deaths (2016)	Deaths (2015)	Deaths (2014)	Deaths (2013)	Deaths (2012)	Deaths (2011)	Deaths (2010)	Deaths (2009)	Deaths (2008)	Deaths (2007)	Deaths (2006)	Deaths (2005)	Deaths (2004)	Deaths (2003)	Deaths (2002)	Deaths (2001)	Deaths (2000)	Deaths (1990)	Deaths (1985)	Deaths (1980)
Turkey	86 092 168	491,684	489,734	526,534	505,540	566,745	509,147	436,624	426,785	426,857	422,964	405,528	391,091	373,041	376,520	376,162	366,471	369,703	215,562	212,731	210,146	197,520	187,086	184,330	175,434	175,137	174,315	150,292	141,324	130,062
İstanbul	15 754 053	70,492	71,338	70,033	73,899	84,288	76,421	63,486	62,594	63,389	62,572	60,093	58,009	54,770	54,696	53,165	52,812	53,761	50,403	50,830	50,436	49,621	41,161	38,732	34,378	38,242	38,600	38,862	32,551	32,395
West Marmara	3 868 967	31,924	32,201	31,197	33,335	35,757	29,389	27,589	27,456	27,222	26,416	26,145	24,864	23,229	23,496	23,167	23,007	22,687	9,703	9,217	9,231	8,554	8,635	8,616	8,117	7,828	8,033	6,593	6,854	5,763
Tekirdağ	1 208 441	7,149	6,929	6,690	7,180	7,511	6,351	5,663	5,749	5,456	5,314	5,074	4,986	4,530	4,690	4,390	4,368	4,472	2,214	2,023	2,047	1,946	1,815	1,843	1,713	1,687	1,601	1,349	1,148	1,021
Edirne	422 438	3,982	4,091	4,006	4,253	4,603	3,782	3,547	3,509	3,558	3,418	3,541	3,263	2,991	3,205	3,109	3,138	2,960	1,751	1,667	1,705	1,497	1,434	1,539	1,495	1,320	1,354	995	1,048	1,038
Kırklareli	379 595	3,338	3,535	3,416	3,771	3,873	3,265	2,942	2,993	2,941	2,789	2,943	2,814	2,706	2,557	2,671	2,634	2,534	894	886	870	807	863	831	760	737	803	742	698	678
Balıkesir	1 284 517	12,119	12,310	11,927	12,529	13,806	11,271	10,901	10,710	10,723	10,468	10,271	9,609	9,074	9,035	8,999	8,933	8,762	3,722	3,538	3,512	3,252	3,400	3,277	3,129	3,095	3,361	2,684	3,169	2,447
Çanakkale	573 976	5,336	5,336	5,158	5,602	5,964	4,720	4,536	4,495	4,544	4,427	4,316	4,192	3,928	4,009	3,998	3,934	3,959	1,122	1,103	1,097	1,052	1,123	1,126	1,020	989	914	823	791	579
Aegean	11 011 261	80,000	80,349	78,059	83,197	87,919	79,807	71,047	68,644	68,480	67,699	64,844	61,126	57,651	60,234	59,623	56,658	57,068	31,568	31,657	32,125	29,582	30,065	29,600	28,865	27,675	28,093	23,088	22,497	17,114
İzmir	4 504 185	31,494	31,452	30,842	32,670	34,224	29,940	27,587	26,480	26,534	26,214	24,644	23,463	22,136	23,278	22,973	21,713	21,930	18,208	18,714	19,089	18,396	18,249	17,562	17,514	16,901	16,955	13,235	11,419	8,305
Aydın	1 172 107	9,293	9,666	8,943	9,727	10,332	9,095	8,298	8,000	7,736	7,655	7,419	6,751	6,441	6,732	6,616	6,311	6,218	2,550	2,574	2,488	2,190	2,294	2,406	2,116	2,090	2,287	2,068	2,210	1,915
Denizli	1 060 975	7,425	7,466	7,297	7,574	8,111	7,895	6,705	6,194	6,501	6,436	6,122	5,546	5,321	5,561	5,497	5,221	5,234	2,651	2,467	2,242	1,604	1,906	2,039	1,902	1,656	1,589	1,438	1,327	1,197
Muğla	1 099 547	7,205	7,174	7,133	7,568	7,598	6,327	5,862	5,545	5,589	5,338	5,120	4,631	4,397	4,484	4,510	4,327	4,174	836	894	935	695	952	903	1,015	957	960	709	966	613
Manisa	1 477 756	11,371	11,355	10,935	11,717	12,251	11,773	9,940	10,074	9,916	10,064	9,619	9,259	8,504	8,873	8,840	8,498	8,503	3,458	3,264	3,474	3,315	3,126	3,120	2,946	2,911	2,909	2,787	2,997	2,621
Afyonkarahisar	751 808	5,589	5,497	5,283	5,760	6,379	6,243	5,190	5,128	4,906	4,928	5,001	4,769	4,429	4,693	4,653	4,419	4,661	1,464	1,441	1,499	1,315	1,393	1,239	1,164	1,226	1,265	1,178	1,468	1,237
Kütahya	570 478	4,720	4,930	4,792	5,193	5,976	5,283	4,737	4,617	4,722	4,577	4,479	4,348	4,165	4,215	4,297	4,079	4,069	1,597	1,527	1,583	1,382	1,403	1,460	1,391	1,158	1,313	1,071	1,264	1,005
Uşak	374 405	2,903	2,809	2,834	2,988	3,048	3,251	2,728	2,606	2,576	2,487	2,440	2,359	2,258	2,398	2,237	2,090	2,279	804	776	815	685	742	871	817	776	815	602	846	221
East Marmara	8 759 256	52,359	52,332	50,475	53,669	60,306	51,540	45,264	44,858	44,254	43,628	41,991	40,007	38,291	38,220	38,094	37,526	37,379	24,484	24,165	24,265	19,707	19,578	19,354	19,505	18,815	18,164	14,944	13,387	12,015
Bursa	3 263 011	19,408	19,606	18,921	19,770	22,092	19,421	16,706	16,646	16,634	16,470	15,814	15,138	14,618	14,352	14,478	14,230	14,190	11,297	11,027	11,424	8,111	8,723	9,148	9,361	9,097	9,037	6,494	5,900	5,637
Eskişehir	927 956	6,671	6,655	6,409	6,945	7,537	6,458	5,845	5,807	5,692	5,669	5,599	5,302	5,044	5,052	5,083	4,934	4,888	3,992	3,963	4,167	4,048	3,969	3,794	3,881	3,809	3,843	3,601	3,292	2,712
Bilecik	228 995	1,731	1,738	1,678	1,793	2,024	1,826	1,596	1,584	1,521	1,429	1,465	1,450	1,420	1,473	1,401	1,468	1,486	423	397	469	398	422	388	415	375	386	356	400	400
Kocaeli	2 161 171	10,470	10,232	9,771	10,619	12,214	9,857	8,721	8,628	8,362	8,141	7,767	7,284	7,061	6,963	6,650	6,783	6,634	4,644	4,386	4,158	3,722	3,264	3,194	3,115	3,072	2,848	2,263	1,668	1,431
Sakarya	1 123 693	6,778	6,915	6,676	7,054	8,234	6,934	6,193	6,018	6,032	5,894	5,460	5,293	5,106	5,101	5,251	5,053	5,050	2,036	2,346	2,426	1,956	1,749	1,684	1,518	1,523	1,260	1,652	1,376	1,228
Düzce	415 622	2,753	2,617	2,601	2,734	3,109	2,646	2,385	2,342	2,273	2,317	2,281	2,100	1,912	2,103	1,999	1,885	1,924	602	602	346	331	310	301	464	275	144	–	–	–
Bolu	327 173	2,383	2,453	2,435	2,587	2,812	2,581	2,243	2,142	2,099	2,132	2,150	1,993	1,904	1,904	1,949	1,921	1,955	803	760	678	601	631	439	346	312	288	578	751	607
Yalova	311 635	2,165	2,116	1,984	2,167	2,284	1,817	1,575	1,691	1,641	1,576	1,455	1,447	1,226	1,272	1,283	1,252	1,252	687	684	597	540	510	406	405	352	358	–	–	–
West Anatolia	8 516 084	46,317	44,693	44,774	45,829	51,281	50,005	39,814	39,382	38,917	37,765	35,814	34,589	33,219	33,369	33,097	32,270	32,976	26,773	26,777	26,560	25,700	25,191	24,898	23,935	23,768	23,308	18,521	18,159	19,339
Ankara	5 910 320	31,018	29,787	29,856	30,897	33,130	33,007	26,422	26,125	25,618	24,937	23,610	22,419	21,843	21,709	21,153	20,649	21,315	20,747	20,947	20,477	19,455	19,264	18,713	18,235	18,089	17,519	14,607	14,302	15,174
Konya	2 343 409	13,585	13,139	13,207	13,244	16,231	15,228	11,884	11,668	11,824	11,363	10,775	10,800	10,089	10,266	10,551	10,267	10,354	5,542	5,420	5,664	5,862	5,420	5,710	5,240	5,215	5,330	3,536	3,857	4,165
Karaman	262 355	1,714	1,767	1,711	1,688	1,920	1,770	1,508	1,589	1,475	1,465	1,429	1,370	1,287	1,394	1,393	1,354	1,307	484	410	419	383	507	475	460	464	459	378	–	–
Mediterranean	11 028 175	61,241	61,244	92,803	62,727	69,866	61,599	52,801	50,776	50,548	50,229	47,411	45,439	43,949	43,404	42,900	41,834	41,264	22,845	22,646	21,508	20,457	19,968	20,103	19,136	18,427	18,692	14,578	14,210	12,150
Antalya	2 777 677	14,105	13,886	13,762	14,234	15,649	12,342	11,384	10,846	10,502	10,320	9,525	9,028	8,596	8,630	8,224	8,012	7,664	4,648	4,605	4,605	4,164	4,033	4,093	3,625	3,442	3,575	2,216	1,876	1,111
Isparta	445 303	3,298	3,370	3,227	3,494	3,667	3,613	3,153	3,168	3,070	2,977	2,939	2,819	2,771	2,713	2,794	2,678	2,496	1,415	1,253	1,224	1,146	1,130	1,178	1,084	1,043	1,164	915	1,058	873
Burdur	277 226	2,386	2,359	2,280	2,480	2,565	2,438	2,130	2,187	2,121	2,076	1,964	2,005	1,974	1,954	1,853	1,828	1,801	542	585	616	581	515	589	559	491	515	472	509	485
Adana	2 283 609	13,451	13,413	13,562	13,363	14,852	13,514	11,399	10,768	10,941	10,902	10,362	9,812	9,762	9,302	9,299	9,195	9,002	6,908	7,078	6,739	6,882	7,143	7,204	7,067	7,032	7,000	5,780	5,352	5,131
Mersin	1 956 428	11,568	11,633	11,542	11,558	12,675	10,649	9,393	9,153	9,083	9,311	8,767	8,241	7,921	7,903	7,836	7,662	7,681	4,027	3,835	3,494	3,465	3,354	3,405	3,148	3,068	3,140	2,506	2,414	2,080
Hatay	1 577 531	7,867	8,145	27,658	8,719	10,033	9,598	7,610	7,292	7,392	7,204	6,905	6,847	6,373	6,435	6,412	6,139	6,299	2,530	2,520	2,233	1,745	1,523	1,365	1,396	1,326	1,244	1,800	1,943	1,600
Kahramanmaraş	1 146 278	5,439	5,260	16,967	5,738	6,678	6,398	5,165	4,943	4,905	4,972	4,519	4,520	4,414	4,388	4,299	4,201	4,291	1,885	1,933	1,849	1,607	1,390	1,326	1,256	1,215	1,251	889	1,058	870
Osmaniye	564 123	3,127	3,178	3,805	3,141	3,747	3,047	2,567	2,419	2,534	2,467	2,430	2,167	2,138	2,079	2,183	2,119	2,030	890	837	748	867	880	943	1,001	810	803	–	–	–
Central Anatolia	4 164 985	27,353	26,978	26,324	27,490	31,871	28,805	24,198	23,890	24,009	23,914	23,086	22,379	21,238	21,049	21,873	21,299	21,582	9,628	9,265	8,875	8,608	8,531	8,729	8,284	7,937	7,851	6,408	6,350	5,396
Kırıkkale	282 830	3,338	3,535	3,416	3,771	3,873	3,265	2,942	2,993	2,941	2,789	2,943	2,814	2,706	2,557	2,671	2,634	2,534	1,011	957	1,010	1,042	1,006	1,044	1,007	1,009	996	766	–	–
Aksaray	441 136	2,501	2,385	2,325	2,424	2,782	2,435	2,090	1,986	2,069	1,887	1,856	1,872	1,688	1,786	1,879	1,836	1,830	658	644	726	627	626	526	460	450	528	348	–	–
Niğde	374 492	2,380	2,374	2,229	2,447	2,623	2,331	2,155	2,037	2,067	2,131	2,016	1,822	1,806	1,760	1,912	1,799	1,835	594	518	572	530	555	468	432	351	402	432	837	787
Nevşehir	320 150	2,244	2,274	2,222	2,204	2,600	2,356	2,001	1,931	1,990	1,988	1,826	1,844	1,810	1,717	1,767	1,827	1,724	478	486	466	467	427	464	417	420	408	384	426	337
Kırşehir	242 777	1,833	1,734	1,697	1,809	2,049	1,897	1,636	1,618	1,527	1,450	1,439	1,462	1,373	1,362	1,458	1,422	1,439	502	463	413	436	455	478	479	473	517	272	455	354
Kayseri	1 458 991	8,324	8,053	7,894	8,113	9,834	8,640	6,979	7,161	6,980	7,175	6,798	6,407	5,985	5,887	6,113	5,817	5,816	3,904	3,781	3,225	3,252	3,157	3,320	3,081	2,997	2,826	2,437	2,282	1,576
Sivas	631 401	4,693	4,727	4,522	4,917	5,597	5,198	4,305	4,203	4,431	4,349	4,302	4,132	4,078	3,975	3,968	4,039	4,111	1,736	1,732	1,779	1,661	1,699	1,728	1,702	1,644	1,665	1,288	1,699	1,750
Yozgat	413 208	3,200	3,228	3,307	3,344	3,863	3,618	3,098	3,120	3,036	3,104	3,099	2,951	2,822	2,848	2,983	2,923	3,076	745	684	684	593	606	701	706	593	509	481	651	592
West Black Sea	4 716 187	38,607	38,467	38,232	40,950	46,107	39,596	35,366	34,984	34,756	34,359	33,355	32,772	31,011	31,476	31,651	30,541	31,279	12,351	11,562	11,742	11,122	10,575	10,872	10,575	10,046	9,673	9,190	9,160	8,204
Zonguldak	585 203	4,677	4,770	4,793	4,961	5,545	4,622	4,312	4,432	4,130	4,112	3,975	3,900	3,677	3,730	3,706	3,685	3,840	1,582	1,341	1,130	1,052	1,037	1,117	1,307	620	521	1,511	1,730	1,676
Karabük	249 614	2,032	2,005	1,959	2,122	2,303	1,965	1,754	1,766	1,746	1,750	1,672	1,614	1,561	1,662	1,684	1,605	1,605	885	828	863	835	785	779	730	715	577	–	–	–
Bartın	206 663	1,710	1,762	1,814	1,908	1,973	1,624	1,570	1,607	1,627	1,555	1,511	1,473	1,456	1,544	1,450	1,335	1,387	356	290	362	269	244	301	252	220	218	–	–	–
Kastamonu	379 934	3,894	3,998	4,049	4,214	4,777	4,063	3,785	3,865	3,778	3,742	3,690	3,658	3,325	3,511	3,552	3,268	3,525	859	954	850	776	881	860	843	901	899	1,041	777	664
Çankırı	200 549	1,770	1,759	1,697	1,909	2,149	2,118	1,731	1,648	1,592	1,619	1,641	1,586	1,482	1,479	1,468	1,550	1,492	443	434	378	388	376	354	353	338	337	373	510	459
Sinop	225 848	2,445	2,287	2,297	2,579	2,770	2,460	2,044	2,008	2,044	1,951	2,029	1,928	1,818	1,893	1,915	1,826	1,835	444	482	405	406	414	364	360	357	375	342	331	348
Samsun	1 392 403	9,805	9,760	9,647	10,426	12,088	9,778	8,780	8,564	8,714	8,443	8,136	7,882	7,358	7,353	7,206	7,097	7,112	3,728	3,467	3,900	3,858	3,206	3,664	3,409	3,602	3,498	2,816	2,674	1,811
Tokat	614 141	4,884	4,849	4,782	5,011	6,016	5,049	4,564	4,432	4,502	4,461	4,222	4,237	4,139	4,097	4,344	4,113	4,243	1,616	1,547	1,521	1,403	1,355	1,384	1,403	1,363	1,437	1,324	1,162	1,161
Çorum	519 590	4,547	4,409	4,414	4,744	4,997	4,934	4,249	4,092	4,130	4,216	3,958	3,992	3,808	3,833	3,878	3,790	3,950	1,602	1,482	1,512	1,392	1,491	1,290	1,141	1,181	1,008	1,078	1,344	1,298
Amasya	342 242	2,843	2,868	2,780	3,076	3,489	2,983	2,577	2,570	2,493	2,510	2,521	2,502	2,387	2,374	2,448	2,272	2,290	836	737	821	743	786	759	777	749	803	705	632	787
East Black Sea	2 699 769	21,582	21,254	20,735	23,375	25,909	21,344	19,345	18,606	19,186	18,339	17,672	17,292	15,996	16,504	16,266	15,574	16,158	5,197	4,625	4,614	4,312	4,464	4,567	4,181	4,147	3,777	3,008	3,210	1,929
Trabzon	823 323	5,622	5,636	5,443	6,342	7,065	5,911	5,194	5,056	5,130	4,987	4,819	4,956	4,380	4,501	4,632	4,350	4,552	2,210	2,196	2,164	1,914	1,902	1,971	1,700	1,720	1,655	1,236	1,023	629
Ordu	768 087	6,440	6,097	6,099	6,900	7,713	5,945	5,439	5,324	5,509	5,180	5,008	4,832	4,536	4,614	4,490	4,215	4,471	1,362	1,030	1,001	1,054	1,134	1,007	968	840	800	603	558	294
Giresun	455 074	4,389	4,306	4,022	4,482	5,053	4,109	3,820	3,671	3,732	3,606	3,423	3,239	3,042	3,257	3,114	2,969	3,116	644	531	629	533	622	801	718	816	616	444	524	529
Rize	346 947	2,659	2,677	2,576	2,838	3,153	2,658	2,454	2,238	2,403	2,233	2,179	2,033	1,907	1,983	1,854	2,017	1,872	621	552	492	498	510	456	446	403	388	452	654	158
Artvin	167 531	1,528	1,637	1,605	1,672	1,699	1,627	1,445	1,427	1,457	1,401	1,339	1,306	1,292	1,297	1,358	1,215	1,289	217	208	246	216	214	254	274	288	247	185	357	136
Gümüşhane	138 807	944	901	990	1,141	1,226	1,094	993	890	955	932	904	926	839	852	818	808	858	143	108	82	97	82	78	75	80	71	88	94	183
Northeast Anatolia	2 115 281	11,207	11,085	10,710	11,360	13,381	12,568	10,779	10,900	10,930	11,020	11,013	10,787	10,667	11,052	11,870	10,955	11,154	3,675	3,573	3,298	3,198	3,296	3,276	3,100	2,985	3,081	2,176	3,146	2,763
Erzurum	736 877	4,255	4,162	4,023	4,315	5,097	4,807	4,102	4,099	4,133	4,174	4,063	3,894	3,920	4,023	4,364	3,998	4,162	2,278	2,266	2,186	2,107	2,125	2,068	1,914	1,838	1,868	1,164	1,886	1,464
Erzincan	239 625	1,650	1,661	1,565	1,738	1,930	1,686	1,529	1,476	1,453	1,470	1,513	1,448	1,360	1,361	1,375	1,273	1,358	475	455	444	435	452	445	462	406	482	362	414	397
Bayburt	82 836	503	520	492	524	670	617	482	499	526	485	503	506	511	460	425	405	482	84	95	92	90	78	95	82	78	97	56	–	–
Ağrı	491 489	1,796	1,771	1,749	1,744	2,396	2,208	1,736	1,862	1,846	1,877	1,944	2,004	1,995	2,297	2,568	2,230	2,107	298	286	190	152	210	228	224	221	186	166	244	229
Kars	268 991	1,380	1,386	1,360	1,432	1,582	1,587	1,482	1,429	1,490	1,460	1,487	1,438	1,407	1,476	1,617	1,514	1,547	249	191	180	226	235	239	263	258	285	428	602	673
Iğdır	205 071	940	852	815	859	923	841	787	780	756	767	786	744	741	760	772	786	767	168	161	90	96	97	96	61	92	87	–	–	–
Ardahan	90 392	683	733	706	748	783	822	661	755	726	787	717	753	733	675	749	749	731	123	119	116	92	99	105	94	92	76	–	–	–
Central East Anatolia	3 870 158	16,947	16,289	17,585	16,999	20,482	19,989	15,969	15,530	16,132	16,132	15,685	15,441	15,430	15,419	16,551	16,114	16,491	6,093	5,817	5,633	5,511	5,140	5,035	5,160	5,030	4,814	4,054	3,802	3,154
Malatya	755 854	4,527	4,394	5,744	4,678	5,775	5,516	4,323	4,208	4,361	4,266	4,112	3,993	3,893	3,938	3,923	3,824	3,866	2,382	2,465	2,278	2,274	2,134	2,026	2,049	1,924	1,915	1,364	1,028	1,083
Elazığ	605 678	3,690	3,402	3,425	3,762	4,334	4,109	3,311	3,067	3,253	3,273	3,091	3,014	2,897	2,809	2,812	2,862	2,825	1,743	1,615	1,503	1,435	1,411	1,331	1,357	1,349	1,208	965	949	846
Bingöl	282 299	1,234	1,203	1,119	1,148	1,399	1,328	1,058	1,094	1,083	1,122	1,048	1,070	1,125	1,191	1,313	1,193	1,230	223	208	230	181	145	142	121	98	104	153	146	124
Tunceli	85 083	597	585	565	662	696	753	614	551	589	608	565	553	524	478	503	553	517	93	120	91	88	135	132	109	96	102	179	91	155
Van	1 112 013	3,445	3,288	3,372	3,291	4,262	4,228	3,308	3,336	3,354	3,385	3,494	3,499	3,647	3,456	4,164	3,632	3,718	1,238	1,028	1,088	1,044	861	1,021	1,083	1,152	1,079	973	870	470
Muş	389 127	1,446	1,467	1,403	1,454	1,718	1,598	1,379	1,316	1,480	1,450	1,425	1,391	1,390	1,573	1,734	1,848	2,082	136	111	106	152	108	143	147	149	135	114	219	124
Bitlis	360 423	1,305	1,305	1,251	1,303	1,455	1,492	1,207	1,144	1,151	1,131	1,124	1,138	1,173	1,123	1,175	1,313	1,358	143	118	204	239	249	127	177	129	104	204	396	298
Hakkâri	282 299	703	645	706	701	843	965	769	814	861	897	826	783	781	851	927	889	895	135	152	133	98	97	113	117	133	167	102	103	54
Southeast Anatolia	9 587 992	33,655	33,504	45,607	32,710	39,578	38,084	30,966	29,165	29,034	30,891	28,419	28,386	27,590	27,601	27,905	27,881	27,904	12,842	12,597	11,859	11,148	10,482	10,548	10,198	10,237	10,229	8,870	7,998	9,840
Gaziantep	2 222 415	8,782	9,104	12,581	8,889	10,413	10,236	8,234	7,803	7,630	7,986	7,294	7,181	6,985	6,633	6,513	6,584	6,925	5,268	5,449	5,026	5,026	4,612	4,631	4,592	4,538	4,143	3,935	3,470	4,883
Adıyaman	617 821	2,908	2,697	11,171	2,862	3,411	3,274	2,743	2,531	2,504	2,651	2,387	2,384	2,318	2,303	2,341	2,301	2,211	803	745	820	747	771	723	699	646	742	563	643	592
Kilis	157 363	848	796	820	872	1,035	937	853	760	766	792	750	776	775	718	731	718	754	346	280	316	314	306	304	348	336	331	–	–	–
Şanlıurfa	2 265 800	7,160	7,356	7,362	6,768	8,158	7,319	6,529	5,979	6,108	6,399	5,968	5,922	5,860	6,100	6,184	6,034	5,845	2,198	2,227	2,160	1,975	1,527	1,524	1,436	1,452	1,654	1,554	1,425	1,542
Diyarbakır	1.852 356	6,334	6,175	6,522	5,982	7,617	7,267	5,621	5,233	5,365	5,616	5,207	5,342	5,269	5,342	5,405	5,389	5,312	2,501	2,317	2,024	1,782	2,075	2,197	2,178	2,102	2,200	1,868	1,315	1,612
Mardin	903 576	3,089	2,948	2,882	3,006	3,576	3,613	2,753	2,691	2,653	2,890	2,625	2,630	2,419	2,461	2,513	2,660	2,609	550	622	576	535	579	552	414	536	551	367	485	613
Batman	662 626	2,085	1,941	1,902	1,912	2,418	2,374	1,869	1,698	1,665	1,775	1,638	1,670	1,623	1,638	1,620	1,646	1,641	607	428	401	301	174	225	133	261	234	–	–	–
Şırnak	573 666	1,311	1,385	1,322	1,311	1,561	1,714	1,297	1,374	1,347	1,674	1,466	1,383	1,314	1,344	1,413	1,379	1,508	428	378	403	351	334	232	228	133	144	–	–	–
Siirt	332 369	1,138	1,102	1,045	1,108	1,389	1,350	1,067	1,096	996	1,108	1,084	1,098	1,027	1,062	1,185	1,170	1,099	141	151	133	117	104	160	170	233	230	583	660	598

==== Regional natural increase ====
Natural Increase by Region and Year

Natural Increase by Region and Year
Region	Population (2025)	Natural Increase (2024)	Natural Increase (2023)	Natural Increase (2022)	Natural Increase (2021)	Natural Increase (2020)	Natural Increase (2019)	Natural Increase (2018)	Natural Increase (2017)	Natural Increase (2016)	Natural Increase (2015)	Natural Increase (2014)	Natural Increase (2013)	Natural Increase (2012)	Natural Increase (2011)	Natural Increase (2010)	Natural Increase (2009)
Turkey	86 092,168	448 198/5.3	435 150/5.1	535 395/6.3	518 705/6.2	610 608/7.3	755 085/9.1	830 286/10.2	873 401/10.9	893 240/11.3	931 380/11.9	959 997/12.4	924 464/12.1	918 085/12.2	876 650/11.8	894 698/12.2	897 048/12.5
İstanbul	15 754 053	83 302/5.4	87 358/5.6	97 299/6.1	96 909/6.2	116 436/7.5	145 119/9.4	160 629/10.6	169 831/11.4	177 455/12.0	182 795/12.6	184 388/12.9	174 620/12.5	171 898/12.5	160 276/11.9	161 009/12.3	156 680/12.2
West Marmara	3 868 967	876/0.3	2 678/0.7	1 574/0.4	−653/−0.2	7 165/2.0	10 602/3.0	13 151/3.7	13 711/4.0	14 079/4.2	14 246/4.2	15 274/4.6	15 577/4.8	15 021/4.6	13 891/4.3	13 277/4.2	13 713/4.4
Aegean	11 011 261	15 216/1.4	22 576/2.1	23 499/2.1	21 836/2.0	33 874/3.2	49 151/4.7	59 008/5.6	64 388/6.3	66 477/6.6	72 343/7.2	76 312/7.7	74 648/7.5	73 185/7.5	68 210/7.0	71 454/7.4	72 859/7.7
East Marmara	8 759 256	34 087/3.9	38 885/4.5	39 950/4.7	37 440/4.5	48 529/5.9	60 909/7.6	67 339/8.5	69 208/8.9	69 957/9.3	70 644/9.5	71 108/9.8	67 470/9.4	66 983/9.5	61 610/9.0	62 860/9.3	63 549/9.6
West Anatolia	8 516 084	37 634/4.5	40 820/4.8	45 282/5.5	42 679/5.2	48 263/6.0	64 909/8.0	72 052/9.1	76 162/9.7	78 691/10.2	81 880/10.8	82 816/11.1	79 374/10.9	77 910/10.8	74 929/10.5	74 651/10.8	74 758/11.0
Mediterranean	11 028 175	57 037/5.3	28 869/2.6	72 075/6.6	68 531/6.3	81 156/7.5	98 364/9.3	109 005/10.5	116 267/11.4	121 332/12.0	127 463/12.7	131 833/13.4	126 737/13.1	126 581/13.3	120 917/12.8	124 289/13.3	126 242/13.8
Central Anatolia	4 164 985	15 443/3.7	16 991/4.1	19 465/4.7	16 546/4.0	21 653/5.3	29 731/7.3	32 679/8.2	34 924/8.8	36 467/9.3	38 483/9.9	41 067/10.6	40 431/10.5	41 585/10.8	41 116/10.7	42 917/11.2	45 592/11.9
West Black Sea	4 716 187	197/0.1	1 109/0.3	1 001/0.2	−2 152/−0.5	6 213/1.3	14 263/3.0	16 735/3.6	18 023/4.0	19 363/4.3	21 640/4.8	24 327/5.4	26 358/5.9	26 901/6.0	26 860/6.0	30 852/6.8	32 693/7.2
East Black Sea	2 699 769	1 680/0.6	3 260/1.2	1 806/0.7	347/0.2	6 373/2.3	10 313/3.8	12 418/4.6	12 370/4.7	13 753/5.3	14 472/5.6	15 525/6.0	16 562/6.5	16 270/6.5	16 570/6.6	18 698/7.4	19 407/7.7
Northeast Anatolia	2 115 281	17 020/7.9	18 824/8.8	21 397/9.9	22 666/10.4	25 033/11.4	29 872/13.5	31 032/14.1	34 332/15.6	35 589/16.2	36 707/16.7	39 209/17.8	38 938/17.6	39 729/17.8	38 909/17.5	40 623/18.4	39 624/18.0
Central East Anatolia	3 870 158	38 218/9.8	38 441/9.8	46 120/11.7	46 031/11.7	50 119/12.7	59 848/15.2	62 374/16.0	65 001/16.9	65 166/17.0	67 997/17.8	71 586/18.9	69 533/18.5	68 599/18.4	67 793/18.4	69 941/19.2	70 321/19.4
Southeast Anatolia	9 587 992	147 488/15.6	135 339/14.4	165 927/18.0	168 525/18.4	165 794/18.3	181 924/20.4	193 864/22.2	199 184/23.2	194 911/23.0	202 710/24.4	206 552/25.2	194 216/24.2	193 423/24.5	185 569/24.1	184 127/24.5	181 610/24.5

==== Regional median age value ====
Median age value by province and year

Province	Population (2025)	Median Age (2025)	Median Age (2024)	Median Age (2023)	Median Age (2022)	Median Age (2021)	Median Age (2020)	Median Age (2019)	Median Age (2018)	Median Age (2017)	Median Age (2016)	Median Age (2015)	Median Age (2014)	Median Age (2013)	Median Age (2012)	Median Age (2011)	Median Age (2010)	Median Age (2009)	Median Age (2008)	Median Age (2007)	Median Age (2000)	Median Age (1990)	Median Age (1985)	Median Age (1980)	Median Age (1975)	Median Age (1970)	Median Age (1965)	Median Age (1960)	Median Age (1955)	Median Age (1950)	Median Age (1945)	Median Age (1940)	Median Age (1935)
Turkey	86 092 168	34.9	34.4	34.0	33.5	33.1	32.7	32.4	32.0	31.7	31.4	31.0	30.7	30.4	30.1	29.7	29.2	28.8	28.5	28.3	24.8	22.2	20.9	19.9	19.5	19.0	19.3	20.3	20.4	20.1	20.0	19.6	21.2
İstanbul	15 754 053	35.0	34.5	34.0	33.7	33.4	33.2	32.8	32.5	32.3	31.9	31.5	31.2	30.9	30.7	30.4	30.0	29.5	29.2	29.2	26.3	24.6	23.9	23.3	22.9	23.5	24.9	26.0	25.6	26.0	26.2	26.8	27.3
West Marmara	3 868 967	40.2	39.8	39.3	39.0	38.6	38.4	37.9	37.5	37.2	37.0	36.7	36.4	35.9	35.5	35.2	34.9	34.5	34.1	33.8													
Tekirdağ	1 208 441	36.0	35.6	35.2	34.9	34.6	34.3	34.1	33.8	33.5	33.3	33.0	32.7	32.5	32.2	31.8	31.8	31.2	30.7	30.7	28.6	26.2	24.5	23.6	22.6	21.8	21.6	21.8	22.0	20.9	20.2	20.9	21.5
Edirne	422 438	41.8	41.4	41.1	40.8	40.5	40.4	39.4	39.2	38.9	38.8	38.2	38.0	37.6	37.1	36.8	37.0	36.0	35.5	35.0	30.9	27.1	24.7	23.5	22.3	21.2	20.9	21.2	21.3	21.0	20.0	22.2	21.5
Kırklareli	379 595	41.6	41.1	40.8	40.6	40.1	39.8	39.1	38.6	38.3	38.0	37.7	37.4	37.1	36.5	36.0	36.2	35.5	34.6	34.4	30.7	26.8	24.7	23.6	22.5	21.7	21.6	21.7	21.7	21.1	20.6	22.4	22.6
Balıkesir	1 284 517	42.7	42.3	41.8	41.5	41.0	40.6	40.2	39.9	39.4	39.1	38.8	38.6	37.7	37.2	36.8	36.2	35.8	35.4	34.9	31.7	28.0	26.4	24.8	23.8	23.2	23.1	23.2	22.4	21.9	21.4	21.7	22.1
Çanakkale	573 976	42.0	41.7	41.0	40.7	40.2	40.3	39.5	38.9	38.5	38.5	38.1	37.8	37.3	37.2	37.0	36.0	36.2	35.9	35.4	32.3	29.0	27.0	25.5	24.4	23.2	23.4	23.2	22.9	22.5	22.6	22.6	22.6
Aegean	11 011 261	39.3	38.8	38.3	37.8	37.4	37.0	36.6	36.3	35.9	35.6	35.1	34.7	34.3	33.9	33.5	32.8	32.5	32.2	31.8													
İzmir	4 504 185	39.5	39.0	38.4	38.0	37.6	37.2	36.8	36.4	36.1	35.7	35.3	34.9	34.4	34.1	33.7	33.1	32.8	32.4	32.1	28.8	26.1	25.0	24.1	24.1	23.2	23.4	23.8	23.6	23.3	23.3	23.8	24.1
Aydın	1 172 107	40.4	39.9	39.4	38.9	38.5	38.1	37.6	37.3	36.8	36.5	36.2	36.0	35.3	34.8	34.4	33.9	33.4	33.1	32.8	28.9	26.2	25.0	23.8	22.7	20.6	21.8	22.5	22.1	21.5	21.1	22.3	23.0
Denizli	1 060 975	38.8	38.2	37.7	37.2	36.8	36.4	36.0	35.6	35.1	34.8	34.3	33.9	33.5	33.2	32.8	32.4	31.8	31.4	31.0	28.0	24.5	23.0	21.3	20.2	19.7	20.2	21.0	20.5	20.0	19.6	21.0	21.9
Muğla	1 099 547	40.6	40.2	39.9	39.4	39.2	38.7	38.3	37.9	37.4	37.0	36.6	36.3	35.6	35.1	34.5	34.1	33.5	33.1	32.7	30.0	26.8	25.0	23.2	21.9	20.5	21.0	21.6	21.1	20.6	20.3	21.7	22.6
Manisa	1 477 756	38.3	37.8	37.3	36.9	36.6	36.2	35.9	35.5	35.3	35.0	34.6	34.2	33.9	33.6	33.2	31.7	32.1	32.0	31.3	28.2	25.1	23.8	22.9	22.1	21.4	21.6	22.1	22.3	22.2	21.8	22.4	22.8
Afyonkarahisar	751 808	36.4	36.0	35.5	34.9	34.4	34.1	33.7	33.5	33.0	32.6	32.3	31.9	31.5	31.2	30.9	30.5	29.7	29.5	29.0	25.1	22.3	20.9	19.9	19.1	18.7	19.0	20.0	19.5	19.8	19.1	20.2	21.2
Kütahya	570 478	40.3	39.8	39.1	38.1	37.8	37.5	37.1	36.8	36.5	36.0	35.5	35.1	34.6	34.1	34.2	32.4	33.0	32.9	31.6	27.6	25.3	23.9	22.8	22.8	21.6	22.5	22.8	22.3	21.0	21.0	21.7	22.2
Uşak	374 405	39.6	38.9	38.2	37.7	37.3	36.9	36.2	35.9	35.5	35.4	35.1	34.7	34.3	34.1	33.8	33.2	32.7	32.3	31.9	28.4	25.5	23.3	21.9	20.7	19.5	19.7	20.1	20.0	—	—	—	—
East Marmara	8 759 256	36.8	36.3	35.8	35.2	34.7	34.4	33.9	33.6	33.4	33.3	33.0	32.7	32.4	32.1	31.7	31.3	30.9	30.5	30.3													
Bursa	3 263 011	36.8	36.3	35.9	35.4	35.1	34.8	34.6	34.2	34.0	33.6	33.2	32.9	32.6	32.3	31.9	31.5	31.1	30.7	30.6	28.0	25.9	24.9	24.0	23.7	23.1	23.4	23.5	23.0	22.8	22.3	22.7	23.1
Eskişehir	927 956	38.6	38.2	37.8	37.4	37.2	36.9	36.4	36.0	35.8	35.5	35.3	34.9	34.6	34.3	33.9	33.7	33.2	32.9	32.8	29.4	26.3	24.4	23.1	22.3	20.8	21.3	21.7	21.4	21.0	20.6	21.2	21.7
Bilecik	228 995	37.6	37.1	36.7	35.8	35.1	36.1	35.6	34.5	34.2	33.9	33.8	33.4	33.0	33.0	32.5	28.9	31.7	32.6	30.4	28.9	26.8	25.8	25.1	24.8	24.1	24.1	24.0	22.9	22.4	21.2	22.3	23.1
Kocaeli	2 161 171	34.4	34.0	33.6	33.2	33.0	32.6	32.3	32.0	31.7	31.4	31.2	30.9	30.7	30.4	30.1	29.7	29.2	28.8	28.6	25.7	23.3	22.3	21.7	21.9	21.8	21.7	22.1	21.9	20.8	20.6	20.9	21.3
Sakarya	1 123 693	36.0	35.5	35.1	34.7	34.4	34.1	33.7	33.5	33.2	32.8	32.5	32.2	31.9	31.6	31.3	30.9	30.4	30.0	29.7	26.7	23.6	22.1	20.9	19.5	19.0	19.2	20.1	20.1	—	—	—	—
Düzce	415 622	36.8	36.3	35.8	35.2	34.7	34.4	33.9	33.6	33.4	33.2	33.1	32.7	32.3	32.0	31.7	31.3	30.7	30.4	30.1	27.1	—	—	—	—	—	—	—	—	—	—	—	—
Bolu	327 173	38.8	38.4	37.9	37.5	37.1	37.0	36.3	36.0	35.7	35.4	35.4	35.2	34.8	34.3	34.0	34.0	33.4	33.1	32.5	29.8	25.2	23.3	22.0	21.6	20.8	20.6	21.5	20.9	20.8	20.0	20.8	21.4
Yalova	311 635	37.5	37.2	36.9	36.7	36.4	36.3	35.9	35.7	35.7	35.5	35.3	35.1	34.6	34.4	34.2	33.7	33.1	32.7	32.7	28.7	—	—	—	—	—	—	—	—	—	—	—	—
West Anatolia	8 516 084	35.7	35.3	34.8	34.4	34.0	33.7	33.3	32.9	32.7	32.4	32.0	31.7	31.5	31.1	30.8	30.5	30.0	29.6	29.4													
Ankara	5 910 320	36.4	35.9	35.4	35.0	34.7	34.4	33.9	33.5	33.4	33.1	32.7	32.3	32.2	31.8	31.5	31.2	30.8	30.4	30.2	26.8	23.9	22.2	21.1	20.8	20.3	20.3	21.4	21.5	21.6	21.5	21.5	21.6
Konya	2 343 409	33.8	33.4	32.9	32.4	32.1	31.8	31.5	31.2	30.8	30.5	30.2	29.9	29.5	29.3	29.0	28.6	28.1	27.7	27.4	23.7	21.5	19.9	19.1	18.7	17.6	18.1	18.9	19.1	19.2	19.0	19.7	20.6
Karaman	262 355	35.6	35.1	34.5	34.0	33.6	33.3	33.0	32.7	32.5	32.0	31.7	31.4	31.0	30.6	30.3	29.8	29.1	28.9	28.6	25.1	21.9	—	—	—	—	—	—	—	—	—	—	—
Mediterranean	11 028 175	35.0	34.6	34.2	33.6	33.2	32.7	32.4	32.0	31.7	31.3	31.0	30.6	30.3	29.9	29.5	28.9	28.5	28.2	27.9													
Antalya	2 777 677	36.8	36.4	36.1	35.6	35.4	35.0	34.6	34.3	33.9	33.4	33.0	32.7	32.4	32.1	31.7	31.3	30.8	30.5	30.2	28.1	24.5	22.1	20.2	19.8	18.6	18.6	18.9	18.9	19.0	18.4	19.6	21.0
Isparta	445 303	38.9	38.2	37.5	37.1	36.6	36.3	35.5	35.2	35.0	35.1	34.8	34.5	34.0	33.6	33.5	30.1	31.5	31.8	30.0	26.3	24.6	23.2	22.2	21.5	20.5	21.0	21.6	21.0	20.3	19.7	20.8	21.8
Burdur	277 226	39.7	39.7	39.2	38.7	38.3	38.6	37.7	37.4	37.4	37.4	37.2	37.0	36.5	36.3	36.3	34.7	35.1	35.2	33.9	30.8	27.0	24.3	22.6	21.2	20.4	20.4	21.1	20.3	20.2	19.4	21.1	22.4
Adana	2 283 609	34.5	34.0	33.5	33.0	32.6	32.1	31.9	31.5	31.1	30.7	30.3	30.0	29.6	29.3	28.8	28.3	27.8	27.5	27.4	23.5	19.9	18.9	18.0	18.0	17.0	16.7	17.1	17.7	18.7	18.3	18.8	19.7
Mersin	1 956 428	35.9	35.4	35.0	34.5	34.2	33.7	33.5	33.1	32.7	32.3	32.0	31.6	31.2	30.8	30.4	29.9	29.2	29.0	28.5	24.6	21.9	20.5	19.3	19.1	18.2	18.3	18.9	19.0	19.4	18.8	19.6	20.8
Hatay	1 577 531	32.2	31.8	31.4	30.6	30.3	29.8	29.7	29.3	29.1	28.8	28.4	28.0	27.7	27.5	27.2	26.4	26.4	26.2	25.9	22.6	19.1	17.8	17.1	16.7	16.0	16.6	18.0	19.1	18.7	17.7	18.3	—
Kahramanmaraş	1 146 278	31.9	31.4	31.0	30.1	29.6	29.1	28.9	28.5	28.0	27.7	27.4	27.0	26.7	26.4	26.2	25.8	25.4	25.0	24.9	21.3	18.1	16.9	16.3	15.7	15.4	15.3	15.7	17.2	17.1	17.3	17.4	17.6
Osmaniye	564 123	33.3	32.9	32.5	31.8	31.4	30.9	30.8	30.4	30.0	29.5	29.2	28.7	28.3	28.0	27.6	27.2	26.7	26.4	26.2	22.6	—	—	—	—	—	—	—	—	—	—	—	—
Central Anatolia	4 164 985	35.9	35.4	34.9	34.2	33.7	33.3	32.8	32.5	32.0	31.7	31.4	31.1	30.5	30.1	29.7	29.0	28.5	28.2	27.8													
Kırıkkale	282 830	38.4	38.0	37.6	37.1	36.6	36.1	35.4	34.9	34.4	34.1	34.2	33.6	33.3	32.7	32.1	31.7	30.9	30.5	29.9	24.6	21.4	—	—	—	—	—	—	—	—	—	—	—
Aksaray	441 136	33.6	33.1	32.5	31.8	31.4	31.1	30.7	30.4	30.0	29.7	29.6	29.2	28.7	28.3	28.0	27.7	27.1	26.7	26.6	22.3	18.2	—	—	—	—	—	—	—	—	—	—	—
Niğde	374 492	34.5	34.1	33.5	32.9	32.5	32.1	31.5	31.2	30.6	30.3	30.0	29.8	29.2	28.9	28.4	28.0	27.3	27.0	26.6	23.2	19.9	17.9	17.1	16.4	16.4	17.1	17.7	17.8	18.6	18.3	18.8	19.4
Nevşehir	320 150	36.6	36.2	35.9	35.4	35.0	34.7	34.3	34.2	33.8	33.5	33.3	33.0	32.3	31.9	31.6	31.1	30.4	30.0	29.5	26.0	22.4	20.2	19.1	18.1	17.3	17.7	18.9	18.2	—	—	—	—
Kırşehir	242 777	38.6	37.9	37.2	36.3	36.0	35.4	34.9	34.7	34.5	34.4	34.1	33.9	33.3	33.0	32.7	32.1	31.5	31.1	30.4	25.6	21.0	18.8	17.6	16.5	15.0	15.5	16.6	17.9	18.9	18.2	18.4	18.7
Kayseri	1 458 991	34.9	34.4	33.8	33.2	32.7	32.3	32.0	31.5	31.1	30.7	30.3	30.0	29.7	29.3	29.0	28.5	28.1	27.7	27.6	24.4	21.0	19.5	18.6	17.5	17.1	17.6	18.2	18.8	18.8	18.7	19.3	20.1
Sivas	631 401	36.9	36.4	36.0	35.1	34.5	34.1	33.5	33.3	32.5	32.3	32.0	31.9	31.0	30.4	29.9	28.7	28.6	28.3	27.6	24.1	20.7	18.9	17.8	17.2	17.0	17.1	18.2	18.2	18.4	18.1	18.4	19.0
Yozgat	413 208	38.4	37.8	37.2	36.4	35.6	35.0	34.6	34.2	33.6	33.2	32.8	32.1	31.2	30.5	29.8	29.1	28.4	27.8	27.4	22.5	19.4	18.4	17.6	16.7	15.6	16.9	17.7	18.4	19.0	18.6	18.8	19.0
West Black Sea	4 716 187	40.6	40.2	39.6	38.9	38.3	37.8	37.3	36.8	36.3	36.0	35.6	35.1	34.5	34.0	33.5	32.7	32.2	31.8	31.1													
Zonguldak	585 203	42.3	41.7	40.9	40.4	39.8	39.3	38.4	37.7	37.4	36.9	36.4	35.7	35.1	34.4	33.8	33.0	32.5	32.1	31.6	27.5	22.6	20.8	19.6	19.3	19.2	19.4	20.7	21.1	20.9	20.9	21.4	21.8
Karabük	249 614	39.5	38.9	37.9	37.2	37.0	37.4	36.3	35.9	35.4	35.1	35.2	35.3	34.9	35.1	35.3	33.7	34.5	34.4	33.4	29.4	—	—	—	—	—	—	—	—	—	—	—	—
Bartın	206 663	41.9	41.4	40.7	40.2	39.9	39.6	39.0	38.4	38.1	37.6	37.3	36.9	36.3	35.8	35.5	34.8	34.1	33.9	33.4	29.0	—	—	—	—	—	—	—	—	—	—	—	—
Kastamonu	379 934	43.3	42.9	42.4	41.6	41.2	40.6	39.9	39.5	38.9	38.2	38.3	38.0	37.6	37.2	36.7	36.1	35.7	35.3	34.6	32.3	27.2	24.9	23.7	23.2	22.8	22.0	22.6	22.7	21.7	21.5	22.5	23.1
Çankırı	200 549	40.3	40.1	39.8	38.7	38.2	38.5	38.1	37.5	37.0	37.1	37.1	37.0	36.0	35.3	35.2	34.9	34.3	33.6	32.6	27.6	24.1	21.7	20.1	19.8	18.4	18.9	20.0	19.9	19.4	19.8	20.1	20.4
Sinop	225 848	44.0	43.4	42.8	42.4	41.8	41.4	40.8	40.3	39.7	39.6	39.3	39.1	38.2	37.5	36.8	36.2	35.6	35.0	34.4	29.9	23.4	21.1	19.9	19.3	19.1	19.2	19.9	19.9	19.7	19.3	19.9	20.5
Samsun	1 392 403	38.8	38.3	37.8	37.2	36.6	36.1	35.6	35.2	34.9	34.5	34.0	33.4	32.9	32.5	32.0	31.2	30.6	30.2	29.6	25.4	21.4	19.7	18.7	18.2	17.7	17.8	18.5	18.8	18.5	18.4	19.1	20.2
Tokat	614 141	39.9	39.4	38.7	37.8	37.1	36.6	36.1	35.6	35.1	34.6	34.2	33.7	33.1	32.5	31.9	30.8	30.2	29.9	29.2	23.9	20.7	19.4	18.7	18.6	18.1	18.5	19.2	18.9	18.6	18.5	18.9	19.7
Çorum	519 590	41.3	40.9	40.3	39.6	38.9	38.1	37.7	37.1	36.7	36.3	35.9	35.3	34.6	34.1	33.4	32.8	32.0	31.4	30.7	26.2	21.6	19.9	19.2	18.6	18.7	18.9	19.8	19.7	19.4	18.9	19.5	20.3
Amasya	342 242	40.5	40.0	39.8	39.0	38.7	38.1	37.3	36.9	36.7	36.6	36.3	35.9	35.3	34.9	34.2	32.5	33.0	32.5	31.5	26.9	23.5	21.8	20.5	19.8	19.7	20.3	21.3	20.1	20.1	19.7	20.5	21.3
East Black Sea	2 699 769	40.8	40.3	39.8	39.0	38.4	37.9	37.3	37.0	36.2	35.8	35.5	35.0	34.4	33.8	33.3	32.7	31.9	31.5	30.9													
Trabzon	823 323	39.2	38.7	38.1	37.4	36.8	36.3	35.9	35.5	34.9	34.5	34.2	33.8	33.2	32.6	32.2	31.7	31.0	30.6	30.1	25.7	22.1	20.0	18.6	17.6	16.6	16.2	17.6	18.9	18.8	17.8	17.7	17.2
Ordu	768 087	41.6	41.1	40.6	39.8	39.3	38.5	38.2	37.6	36.9	36.4	35.9	35.4	34.7	34.0	33.4	32.6	31.8	31.2	30.5	25.0	20.9	18.7	18.0	16.6	16.4	16.4	17.5	18.1	17.9	17.1	17.2	17.5
Giresun	455 074	43.5	42.9	42.4	41.6	41.0	40.4	39.9	39.6	38.6	38.1	37.9	37.7	36.8	35.9	35.2	34.7	33.7	33.2	32.4	27.4	23.3	20.1	18.8	18.2	17.0	16.6	18.3	19.2	18.3	17.3	17.6	18.5
Rize	346 947	40.1	39.8	39.4	38.5	37.9	37.5	37.1	37.0	36.1	35.8	35.5	35.0	34.2	33.5	33.2	32.7	32.0	31.6	31.0	27.6	23.1	21.0	19.2	17.9	17.4	17.5	18.9	19.5	18.8	18.2	18.6	—
Artvin	167 531	42.5	41.9	41.4	40.9	40.6	40.1	39.5	39.3	38.5	38.2	37.8	37.4	36.6	36.2	35.6	35.4	34.8	34.1	33.4	29.4	24.8	22.4	20.6	19.4	18.8	18.6	19.4	19.9	19.6	18.9	19.3	—
Gümüşhane	138 807	37.3	36.7	36.1	34.9	33.9	34.5	32.5	32.5	31.0	30.6	30.6	30.6	30.6	30.5	30.4	30.3	29.5	29.2	28.5	24.2	20.8	18.8	17.6	16.8	16.3	16.0	17.1	18.1	17.9	16.7	16.1	14.9
Northeast Anatolia	2 115 281	30.1	29.4	28.8	28.3	27.6	27.2	26.7	26.3	25.6	25.4	25.1	24.9	24.5	24.2	24.0	23.8	23.5	23.4	23.3													
Erzurum	736 877	31.5	30.8	30.2	29.6	29.0	28.6	28.0	27.7	27.1	26.9	26.6	26.6	26.0	25.5	25.2	25.1	24.5	24.4	24.2	21.4	19.0	18.0	17.6	17.7	18.2	18.5	19.3	20.2	19.0	18.5	18.3	18.0
Erzincan	239 625	36.1	35.6	35.1	34.4	33.7	33.7	33.2	32.8	31.6	32.1	31.8	31.7	31.0	30.7	30.7	28.8	29.4	29.3	28.2	24.6	22.2	20.7	19.4	18.4	18.0	17.7	18.6	18.6	18.6	18.3	18.0	17.5
Bayburt	82 836	33.4	32.8	31.9	30.9	30.0	30.8	29.5	30.3	28.8	29.3	29.7	29.6	28.4	27.7	27.2	27.5	26.9	26.7	26.4	23.1	20.3	—	—	—	—	—	—	—	—	—	—	—
Ağrı	491 489	25.1	24.5	24.0	23.3	22.8	22.3	21.8	21.4	20.9	20.5	20.3	20.0	19.7	19.5	19.5	19.0	18.9	18.8	18.8	16.6	14.6	14.4	14.6	14.9	14.6	15.0	15.3	17.1	17.0	17.0	16.6	16.1
Kars	268 991	30.4	29.7	29.0	28.7	28.0	27.8	27.1	26.5	26.1	25.8	25.4	25.3	24.9	24.6	24.4	24.5	24.0	23.9	23.9	21.5	18.5	17.3	16.5	16.0	14.8	15.8	16.4	18.0	17.5	18.4	18.0	17.6
Iğdır	205 071	28.7	28.0	27.6	27.0	26.6	25.9	25.7	25.1	24.7	24.4	24.1	23.8	23.6	23.3	23.0	22.8	22.5	22.5	22.3	19.8	—	—	—	—	—	—	—	—	—	—	—	—
Ardahan	90 392	36.5	35.9	35.4	35.1	34.2	33.6	33.1	32.6	32.0	31.4	30.9	30.7	30.0	28.8	28.2	28.4	27.6	26.9	26.8	23.4	—	—	—	—	—	—	—	—	—	—	—	—
Central East Anatolia	3 870 158	29.6	29.0	28.4	27.8	27.2	26.7	26.3	25.8	25.3	24.8	24.4	24.1	23.8	23.4	23.2	22.8	22.5	22.4	22.2													
Malatya	755 854	36.0	35.6	35.2	34.2	33.6	33.1	32.8	32.3	31.8	31.4	31.0	30.5	30.0	29.5	29.0	28.8	28.2	27.7	27.6	23.4	20.4	19.0	17.8	17.2	16.9	17.2	18.0	18.9	18.9	18.4	19.1	20.0
Elazığ	605 678	35.7	35.2	34.7	34.2	33.5	33.0	32.5	32.0	31.5	31.0	30.6	30.4	30.0	29.5	29.2	28.7	28.0	27.7	27.5	23.4	20.1	18.8	17.8	18.0	16.8	17.6	18.3	19.1	19.0	19.0	19.3	19.8
Bingöl	282 299	31.1	30.6	30.0	29.2	28.5	28.1	27.6	27.1	26.5	26.2	25.7	25.4	24.9	24.5	24.1	24.0	23.5	23.2	23.0	19.8	16.1	14.8	14.6	14.7	14.5	14.8	15.4	17.3	18.7	16.9	18.0	—
Tunceli	85 083	40.7	39.9	39.2	38.6	38.2	37.5	36.5	35.1	34.1	33.9	32.4	32.2	31.9	30.0	30.1	32.4	29.7	28.5	28.2	24.3	20.1	17.8	16.5	15.8	14.4	14.7	15.7	18.1	18.3	17.6	18.0	—
Van	1 112 013	26.1	25.5	24.9	24.2	23.6	23.0	22.6	22.1	21.6	21.2	20.9	20.5	20.0	19.8	19.5	18.9	18.8	18.7	18.4	16.1	14.5	14.1	14.4	14.6	15.1	15.0	15.2	16.7	17.0	18.1	17.4	16.1
Muş	389 127	25.3	24.8	24.2	23.6	23.1	22.6	22.2	21.7	21.3	20.9	20.6	20.3	19.9	19.6	19.4	18.9	18.8	18.7	18.4	16.8	14.4	14.0	13.9	13.7	13.5	14.3	14.8	16.5	17.4	16.6	17.0	—
Bitlis	360 423	26.4	25.9	25.3	24.9	24.3	23.8	23.4	23.1	22.5	22.0	21.7	21.3	20.9	20.6	20.3	19.7	19.6	19.4	19.3	17.5	14.8	14.3	14.1	14.4	14.5	14.1	14.5	16.4	17.0	17.4	17.2	—
Hakkâri	282 299	26.8	26.3	25.9	25.1	24.6	24.2	23.8	23.4	22.8	22.3	22.1	21.7	21.4	21.2	20.8	19.4	19.7	19.8	19.0	17.3	15.0	14.8	14.8	14.6	14.8	14.9	15.8	17.1	17.7	17.6	17.7	—
Southeast Anatolia	9 587 992	25.6	25.1	24.7	24.2	23.8	23.4	23.2	22.8	22.4	22.1	21.9	21.6	21.4	21.1	20.9	20.4	20.3	20.3	20.1													
Gaziantep	2 222 415	27.5	27.0	26.6	26.2	25.9	25.5	25.3	25.0	24.7	24.5	24.3	24.1	23.9	23.8	23.6	23.3	23.0	22.9	22.9	20.3	18.3	17.3	17.0	17.2	16.6	17.9	18.8	18.9	18.9	18.8	19.3	19.9
Adıyaman	617 821	30.4	29.9	29.4	28.7	28.2	27.7	27.4	27.0	26.6	26.2	25.8	25.5	25.1	24.7	24.3	23.9	23.4	23.2	22.9	19.2	16.4	15.4	14.8	15.3	14.7	16.5	17.7	18.2	—	—	—	—
Kilis	157 363	28.4	28.1	27.7	27.3	27.1	27.0	26.6	26.3	26.2	25.8	25.4	25.5	25.3	25.5	25.0	24.9	24.6	24.6	24.5	22.0	—	—	—	—	—	—	—	—	—	—	—	—
Şanlıurfa	2 265 800	21.8	21.4	21.2	20.8	20.6	20.4	20.1	19.8	19.6	19.5	19.3	19.2	19.0	18.9	18.7	18.5	18.4	18.5	18.4	17.3	15.9	15.5	15.1	15.7	15.9	16.6	17.6	18.1	18.6	18.6	19.2	20.3
Diyarbakır	1 852 356	26.7	26.3	25.8	25.2	24.8	24.3	24.0	23.5	23.2	22.8	22.5	22.2	21.9	21.7	21.4	20.9	20.7	20.6	20.4	17.8	15.9	15.2	15.0	15.4	15.5	17.0	18.2	18.2	18.5	18.5	19.4	20.5
Mardin	903 576	25.9	25.4	24.9	24.4	23.9	23.5	23.2	22.7	22.2	21.9	21.6	21.3	21.0	20.7	20.4	19.8	19.7	19.9	19.5	17.3	15.0	14.6	14.4	15.0	15.2	16.3	16.8	17.7	17.8	16.8	17.2	17.8
Batman	662 626	25.9	25.4	24.8	24.3	23.7	23.2	22.8	22.3	21.8	21.3	20.9	20.5	20.1	19.8	19.4	18.9	18.7	18.6	18.3	16.3	14.7	—	—	—	—	—	—	—	—	—	—	—
Şırnak	573 666	23.3	23.0	22.7	22.2	21.6	21.2	20.9	20.7	20.1	19.5	19.5	19.1	18.7	18.5	18.3	17.2	17.5	17.8	17.4	16.4	15.0	—	—	—	—	—	—	—	—	—	—	—
Siirt	332 369	25.0	24.5	24.2	23.3	22.7	22.4	22.0	21.7	21.2	20.8	20.5	20.1	19.8	19.5	19.3	18.6	18.8	18.7	18.4	16.6	14.8	14.1	14.3	14.4	14.0	15.6	16.2	17.8	18.0	18.0	18.1	18.2

==== Regional total fertility rate (TFR) ====
Total fertility rate (TFR) by province and year

Figures from Turkish Statistical Institute (TurkStat):

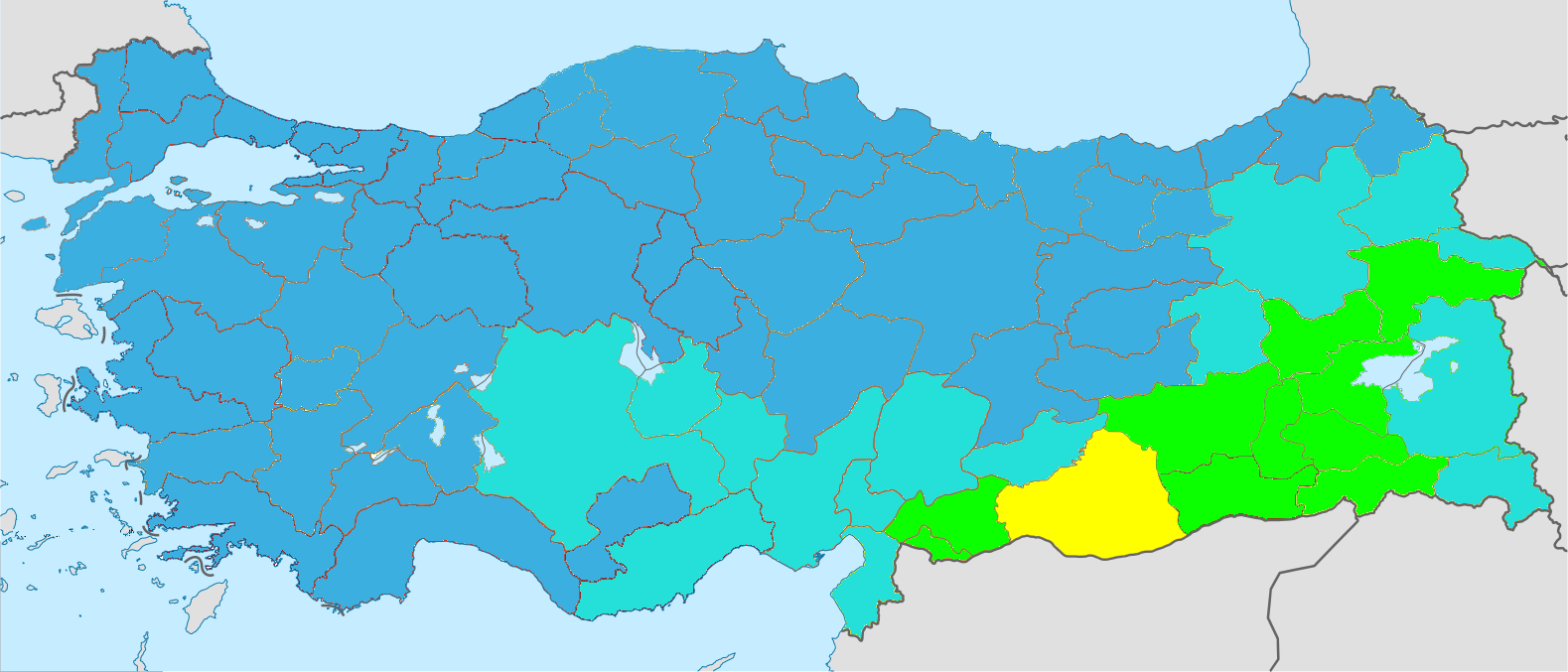
Turkey total fertility rate by province (2024) 3–4 2–3 1.5 – 2 1 – 1.5

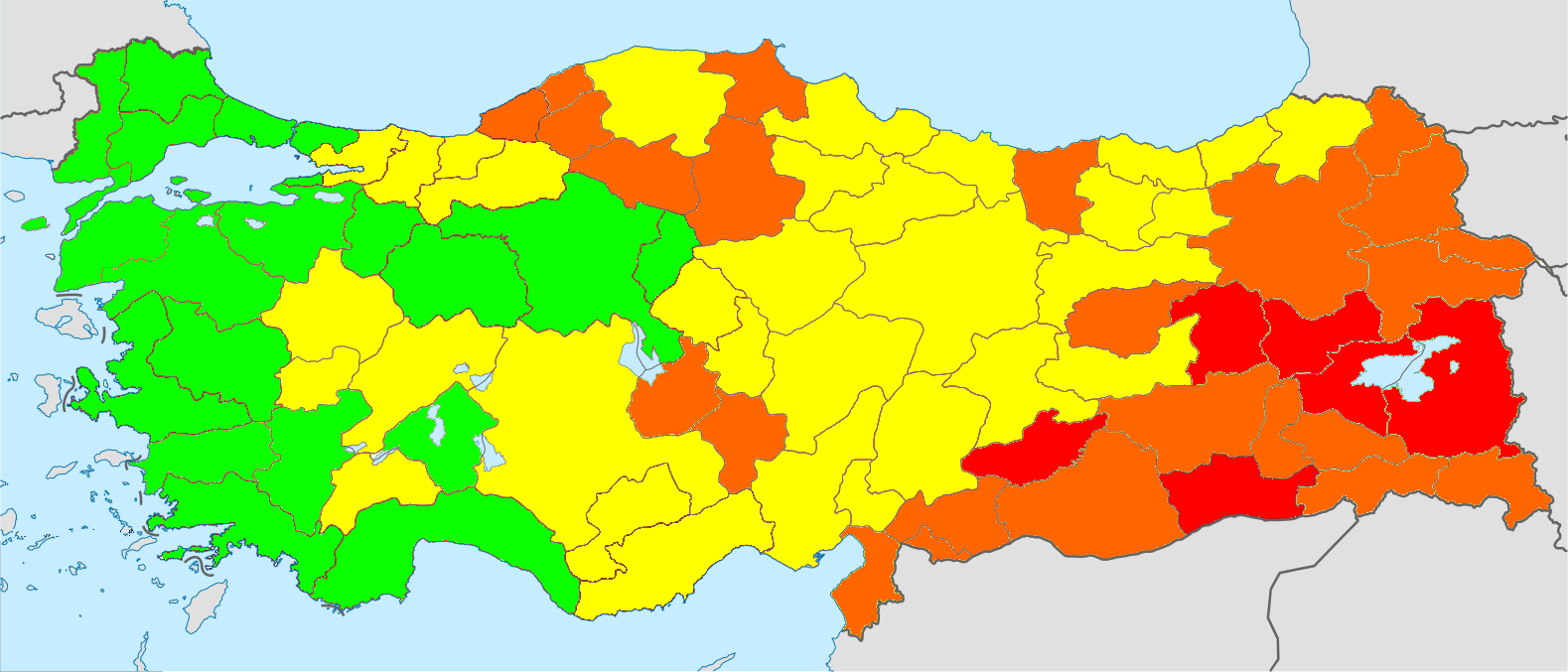
Total fertility rate by province 1980 5–6 4–5 3–4 2–3 1.5 – 2 1 – 1.5

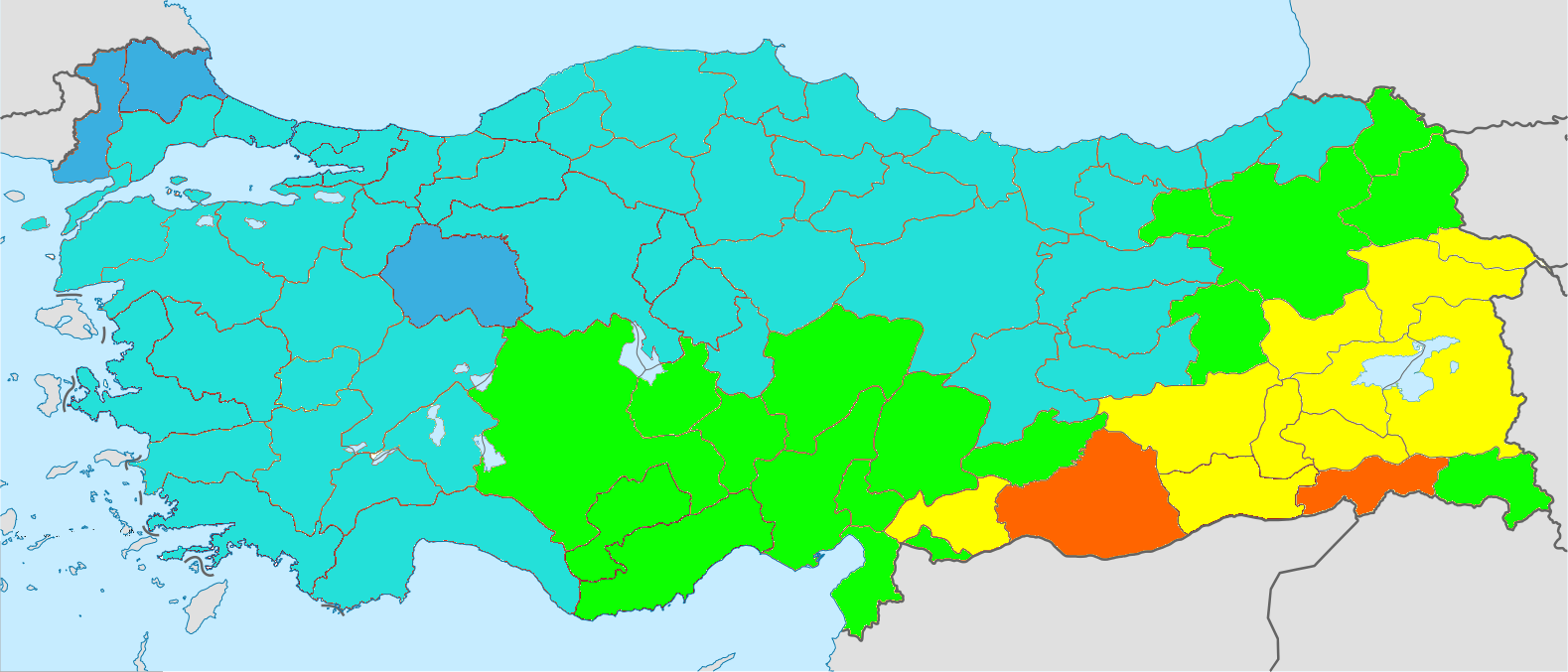
Total fertility rate by province (2013)

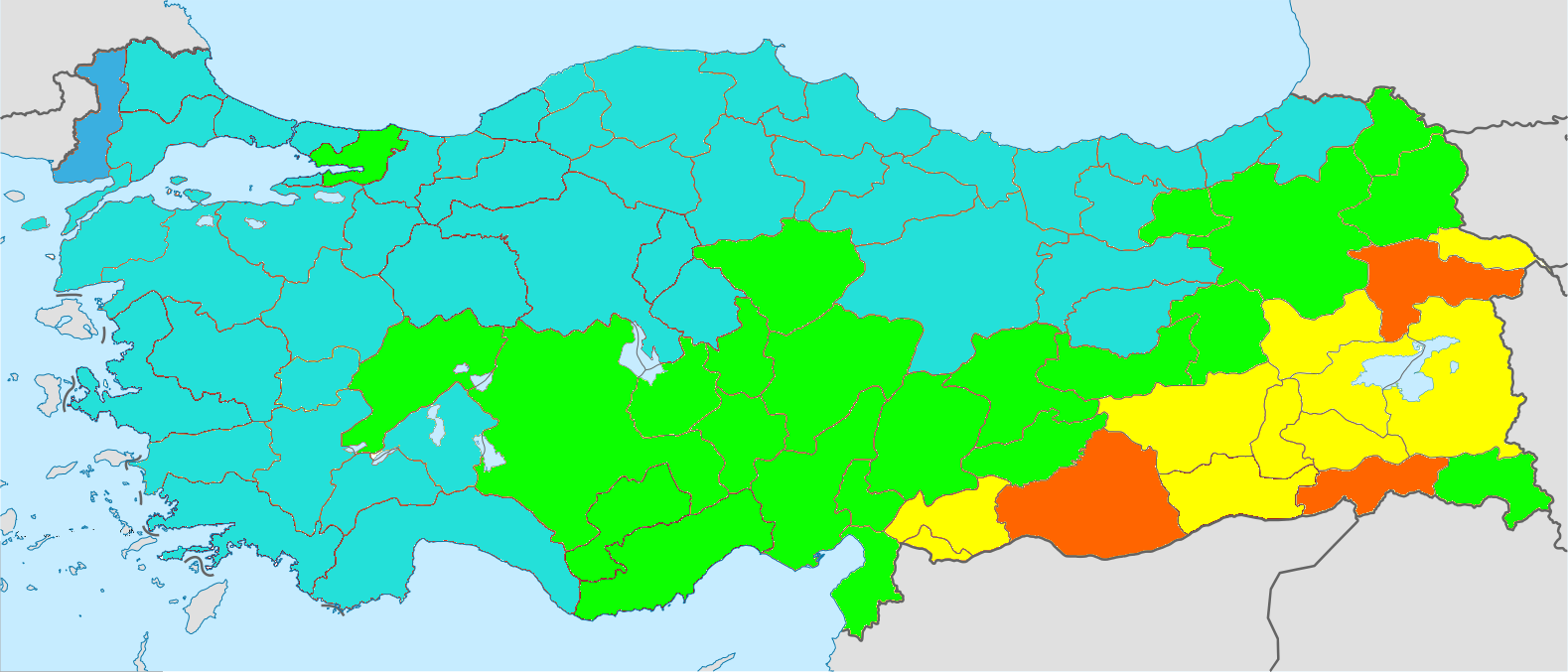
Total fertility rate by province (2014)

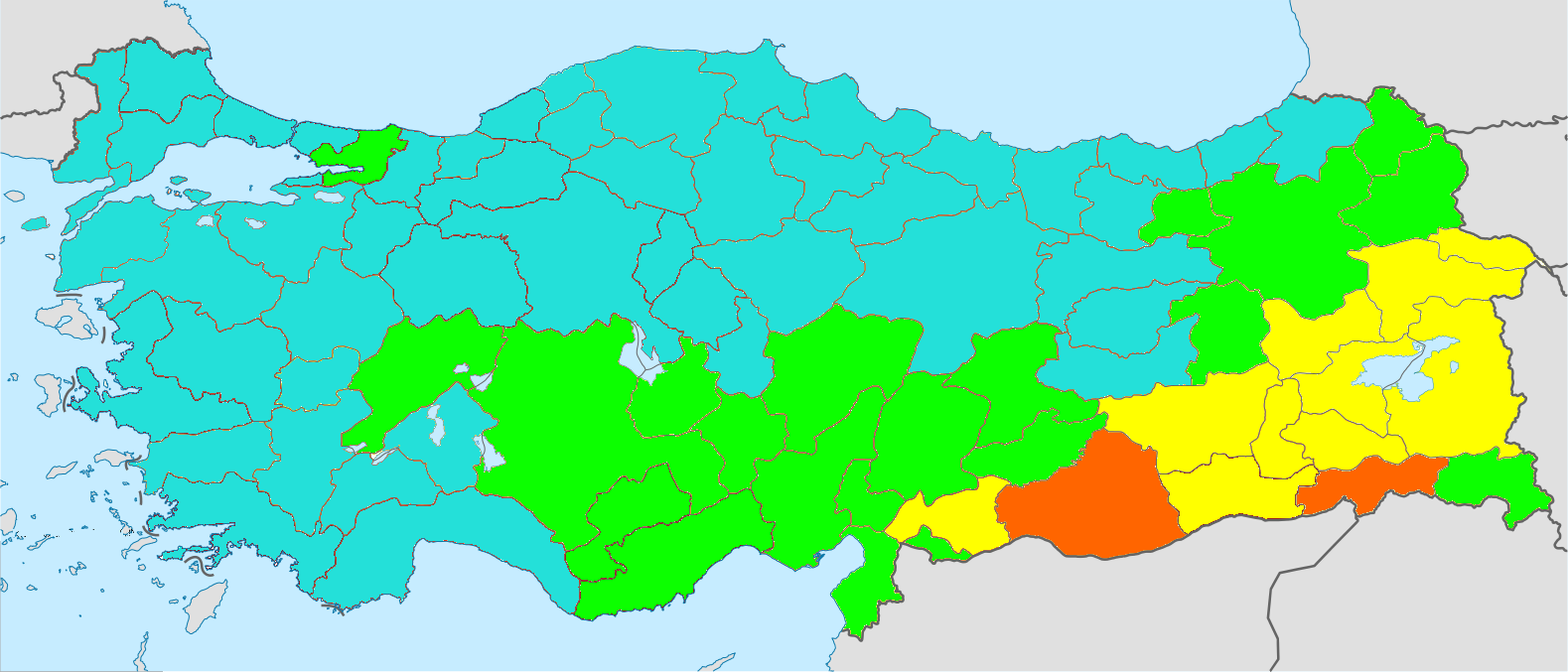
Total fertility rate by province (2015)

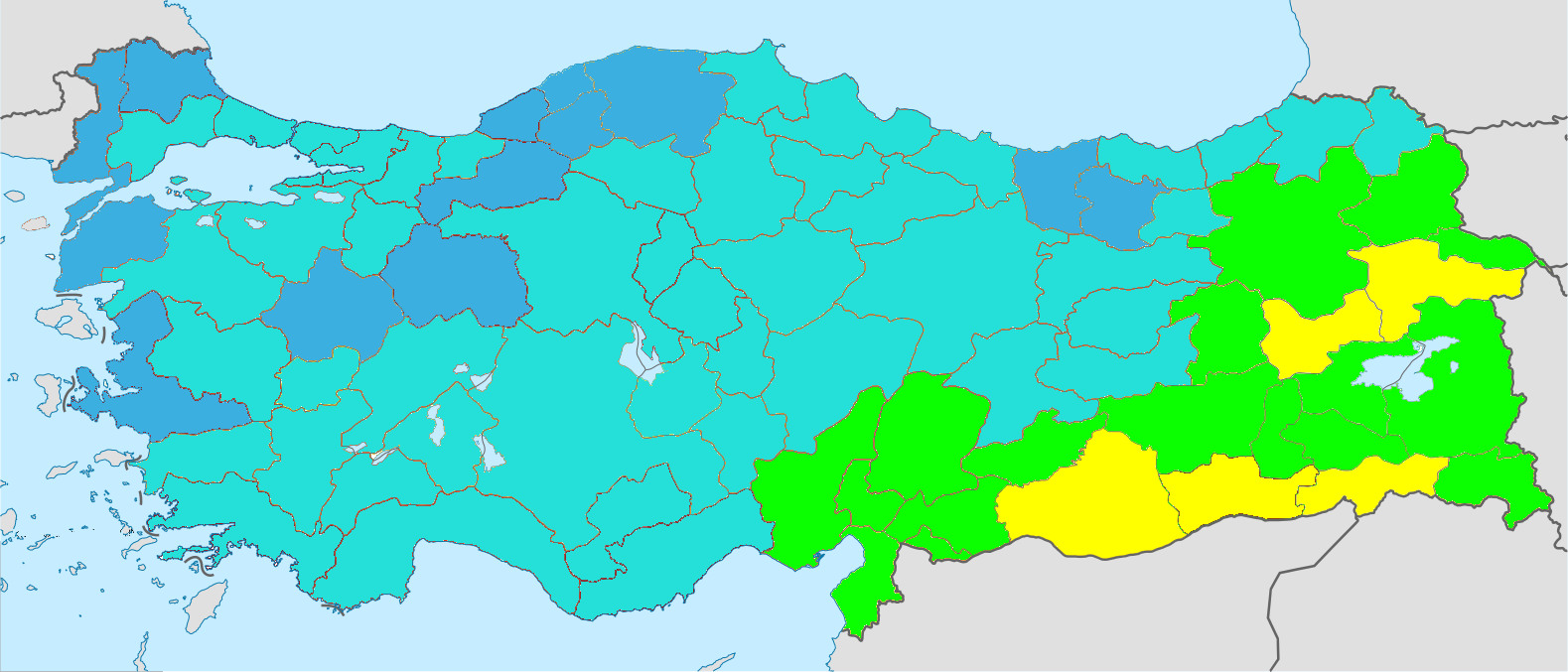
Total fertility rate by province (2019)

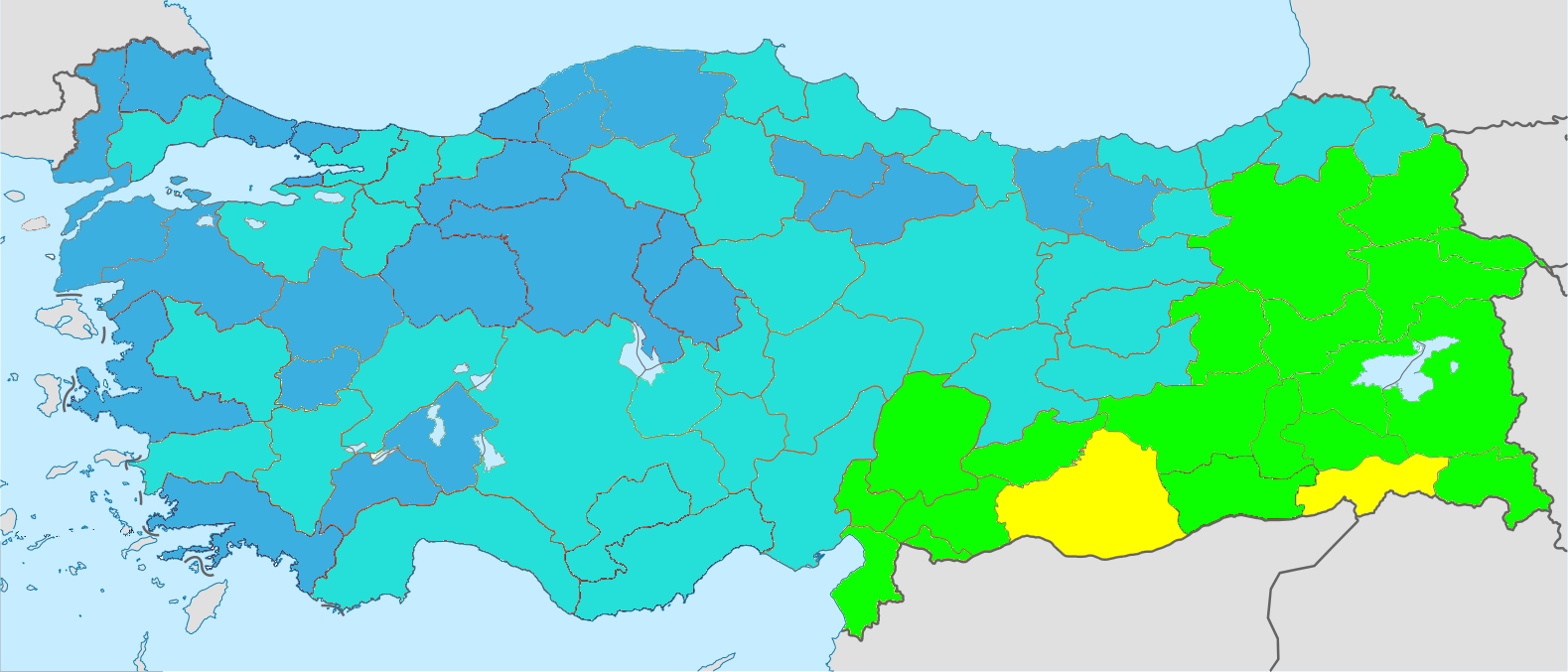
Total fertility rate by province (2020)

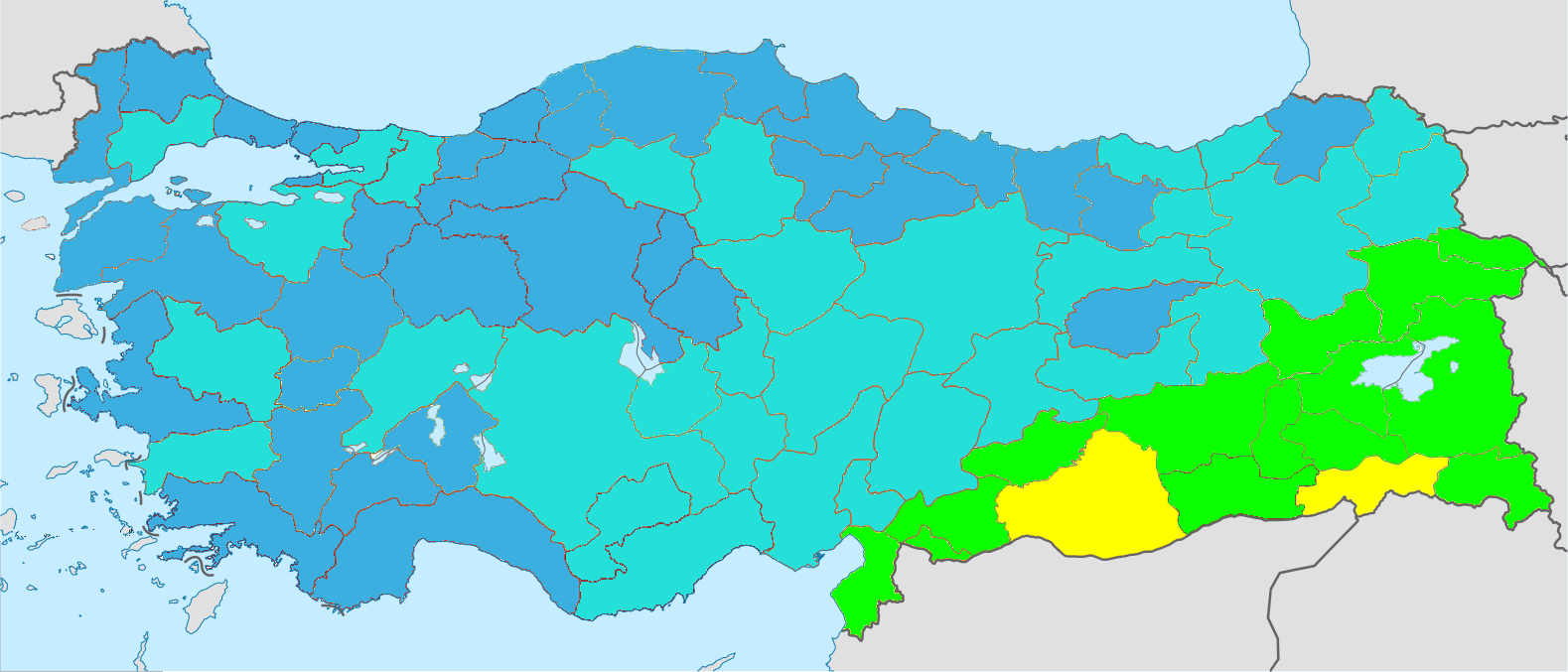
Total fertility rate by province (2021)

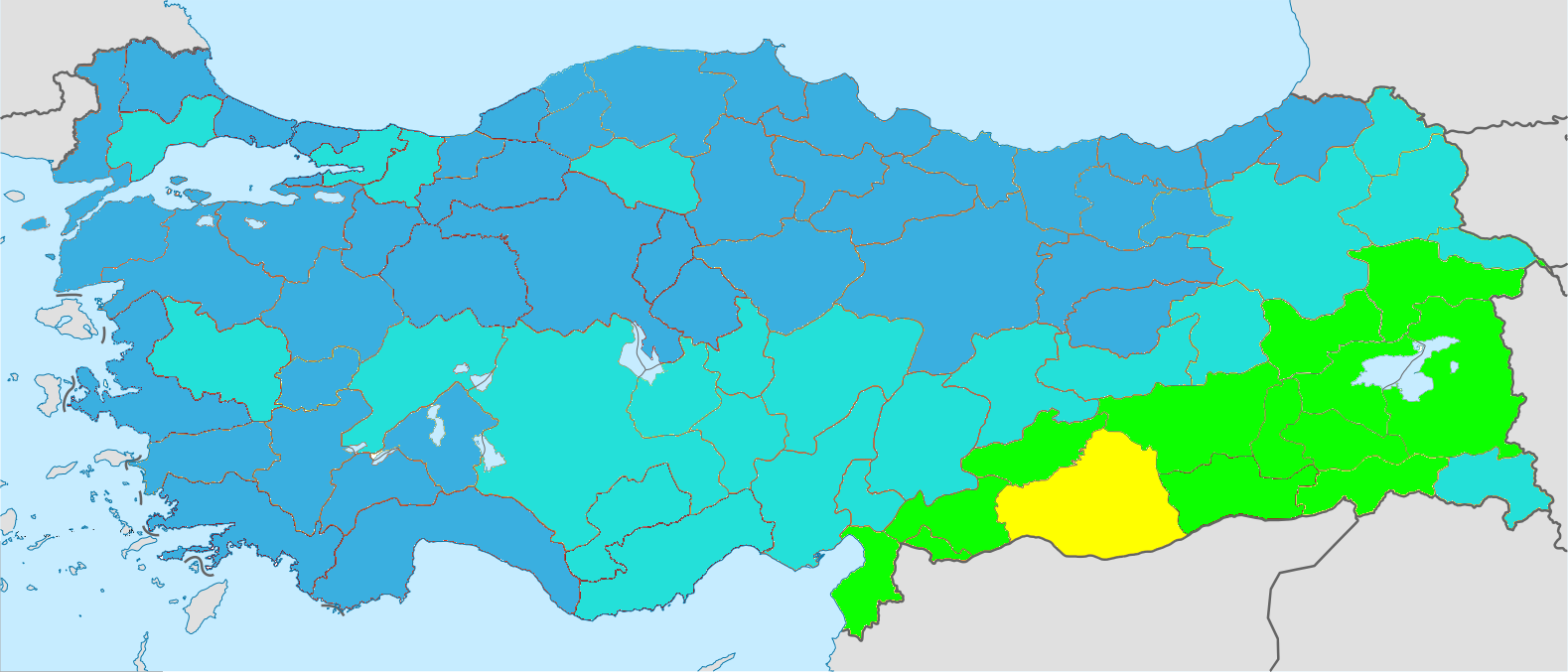
Total fertility rate by province (2022)

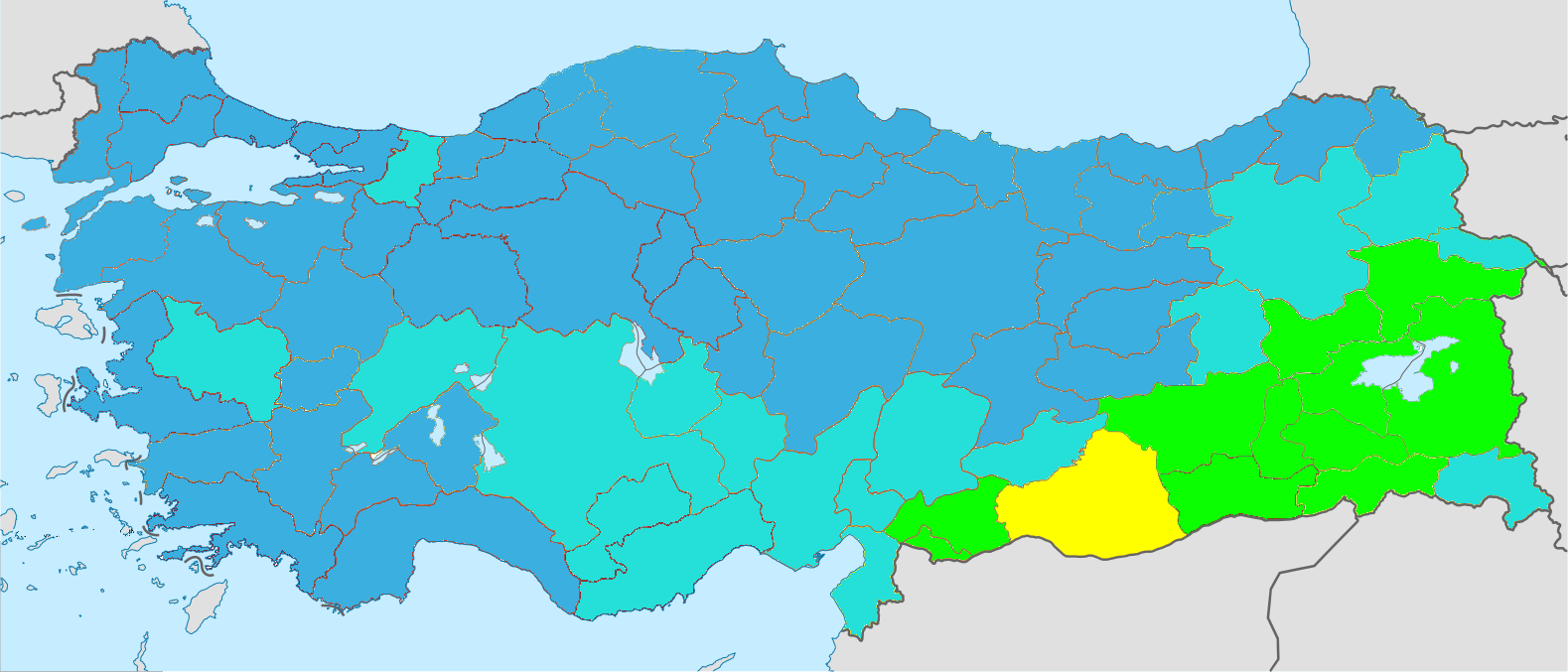
Total fertility rate by province (2023)

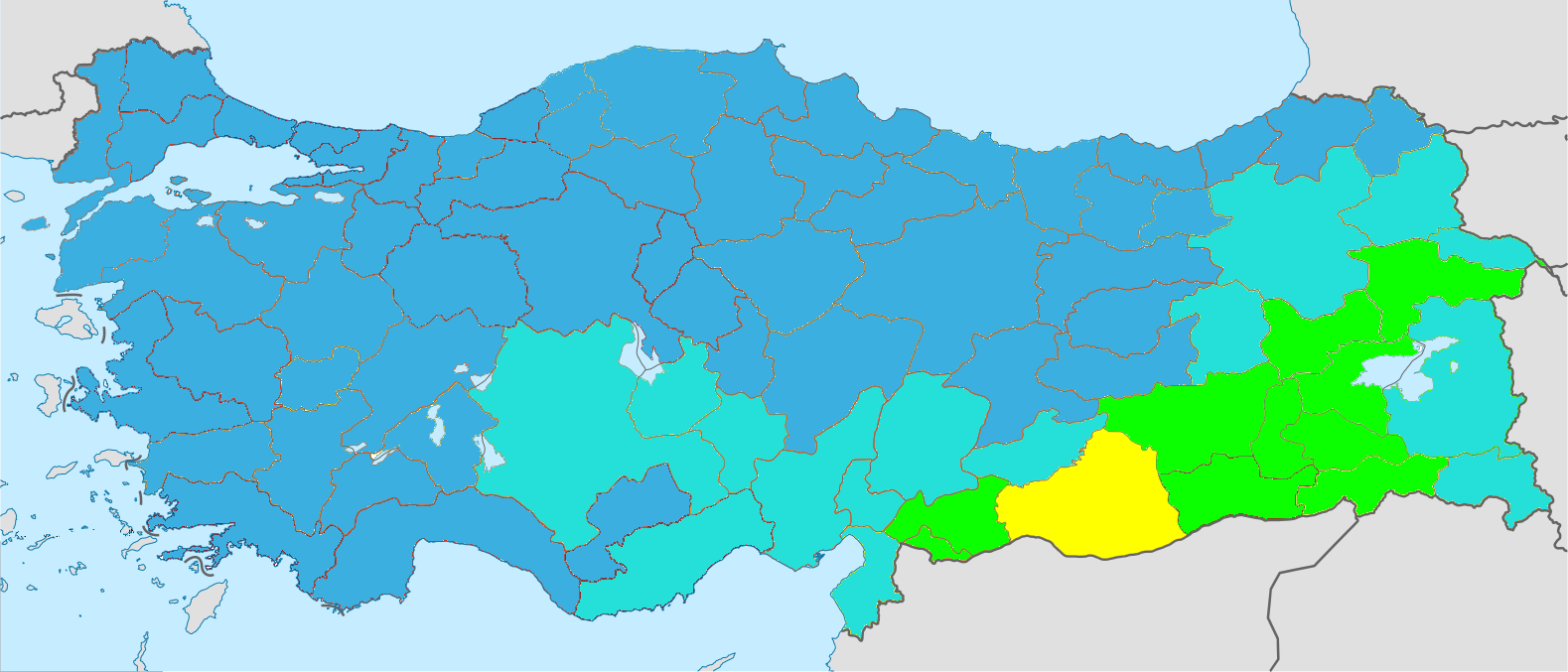
Total fertility rate by province (2024)

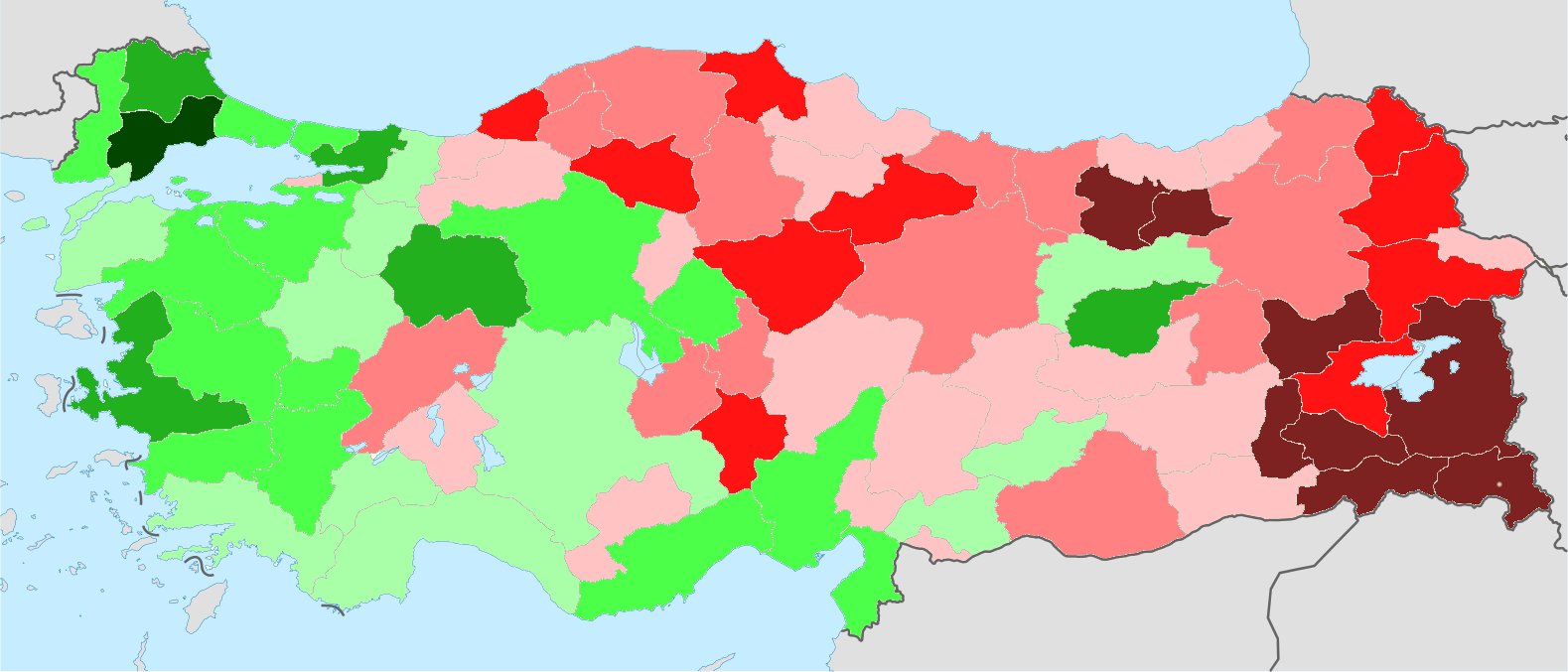
Total fertility rate development by province 2009–2015 > 12% 8 to 12% 4 to 8% 0 to 4% −4 to 0% −8 to −4% −12 to −8% < −12%

Province	Population (2025)	TFR (1980)	TFR (1985)	TFR (1990)	TFR (2000)	TFR (2009)	TFR (2010)	TFR (2011)	TFR (2012)	TFR (2013)	TFR (2014)	TFR (2015)	TFR (2016)	TFR (2017)	TFR (2018)	TFR (2019)	TFR (2020)	TFR (2021)	TFR (2022)	TFR (2023)	TFR (2024)	TFR (2025)
Turkey	86 092 168	3.41	2.59	2.65	2.53	2.10	2.08	2.05	2.11	2.11	2.19	2.16	2.11	2.08	2.00	1.89	1.77	1.71	1.63	1.52	1.49	1.42
İstanbul	15 754 053	2.69	1.96	2.08	1.97	1.77	1.77	1.72	1.80	1.81	1.89	1.88	1.86	1.80	1.73	1.61	1.49	1.39	1.30	1.21	1.20	1.14
West Marmara	3 868 967					1.54	1.54	1.57	1.63	1.64	1.69	1.69	1.69	1.70	1.67	1.57	1.50	1.43	1.41	1.36	1.32	1.25
Tekirdağ	1 208 441	2.64	1.76	2.09	1.83	1.69	1.67	1.72	1.79	1.82	1.88	1.94	1.93	1.94	1.93	1.78	1.65	1.59	1.54	1.46	1.42	1.37
Edirne	422 438	2.41	1.80	1.82	1.66	1.43	1.39	1.45	1.51	1.49	1.46	1.54	1.49	1.47	1.44	1.34	1.35	1.32	1.32	1.23	1.23	1.12
Kırklareli	379 595	2.75	1.84	1.94	1.70	1.38	1.39	1.35	1.45	1.45	1.56	1.56	1.49	1.54	1.49	1.44	1.40	1.30	1.31	1.25	1.21	1.15
Balıkesir	1 284 517	2.42	1.87	2.09	1.95	1.53	1.56	1.58	1.62	1.66	1.72	1.66	1.67	1.67	1.63	1.54	1.49	1.42	1.42	1.36	1.33	1.25
Çanakkale	573 976	2.53	1.64	1.91	1.68	1.50	1.44	1.53	1.58	1.52	1.57	1.55	1.56	1.58	1.57	1.47	1.40	1.32	1.28	1.30	1.22	1.17
Aegean	11 011 261	2.81			1.96	1.69	1.66	1.66	1.74	1.73	1.80	1.80	1.76	1.75	1.68	1.58	1.50	1.45	1.41	1.34	1.29	1.22
İzmir	4 504 185	2.52	1.85	2.00	1.75	1.57	1.54	1.56	1.66	1.64	1.72	1.73	1.69	1.67	1.60	1.49	1.40	1.36	1.32	1.23	1.17	1.10
Aydın	1 172 107	2.62	2.00	2.13	2.12	1.74	1.71	1.69	1.82	1.79	1.84	1.86	1.83	1.88	1.79	1.68	1.58	1.55	1.49	1.42	1.37	1.31
Denizli	1 060 975	2.95	2.23	2.32	2.19	1.73	1.66	1.70	1.74	1.76	1.87	1.86	1.81	1.80	1.72	1.62	1.56	1.50	1.48	1.42	1.35	1.25
Muğla	1 099 547	2.65	1.96	2.04	1.94	1.71	1.70	1.67	1.76	1.73	1.76	1.77	1.74	1.71	1.66	1.55	1.50	1.44	1.36	1.29	1.24	1.21
Manisa	1 477 756	2.82	2.02	2.24	2.14	1.78	1.77	1.79	1.86	1.89	1.94	1.93	1.91	1.87	1.84	1.75	1.69	1.64	1.62	1.57	1.48	1.41
Afyonkarahisar	751 808	3.74	2.21	2.51	2.82	2.06	2.01	2.01	2.03	1.98	2.09	2.08	2.01	1.97	1.89	1.84	1.75	1.68	1.63	1.54	1.47	1.43
Kütahya	570 478	3.10	2.17	2.29	2.19	1.55	1.60	1.53	1.55	1.52	1.58	1.59	1.52	1.51	1.43	1.34	1.32	1.21	1.18	1.16	1.24	1.13
Uşak	374 405	3.18	2.20	2.23	2.18	1.64	1.67	1.64	1.74	1.76	1.80	1.75	1.69	1.70	1.60	1.51	1.45	1.38	1.39	1.33	1.25	1.17
East Marmara	8 759 256					1.77	1.74	1.71	1.80	1.80	1.88	1.90	1.89	1.87	1.84	1.72	1.61	1.56	1.48	1.41	1.36	1.32
Bursa	3 263 011	2.86	2.05	2.03	1.98	1.78	1.77	1.73	1.85	1.85	1.90	1.92	1.91	1.89	1.87	1.75	1.66	1.57	1.48	1.41	1.37	1.32
Eskişehir	927 956	2.74	2.03	1.96	1.74	1.40	1.38	1.38	1.46	1.48	1.57	1.56	1.54	1.55	1.50	1.41	1.35	1.35	1.30	1.20	1.12	1.11
Bilecik	228 995	2.87	2.13	2.05	1.98	1.71	1.67	1.63	1.75	1.77	1.78	1.72	1.74	1.70	1.69	1.62	1.50	1.45	1.40	1.39	1.37	1.27
Kocaeli	2 161 171	3.23	2.16	2.31	2.13	1.90	1.87	1.82	1.91	1.91	2.04	2.07	2.05	2.02	1.97	1.86	1.70	1.66	1.58	1.49	1.42	1.39
Sakarya	1 123 693	3.29	2.02	2.35	2.23	1.87	1.82	1.78	1.85	1.83	1.91	1.94	1.95	1.95	1.95	1.81	1.69	1.68	1.56	1.53	1.44	1.41
Düzce	415 622	–	–	–	2.18	1.87	1.83	1.82	1.81	1.87	1.90	1.86	1.90	1.84	1.78	1.72	1.60	1.50	1.49	1.43	1.43	1.36
Bolu	327 173	3.34	2.28	2.40	1.93	1.60	1.57	1.64	1.59	1.64	1.66	1.60	1.62	1.57	1.52	1.47	1.36	1.37	1.32	1.24	1.27	1.22
Yalova	311 635	–	–	–	1.93	1.78	1.64	1.62	1.72	1.69	1.81	1.79	1.89	1.83	1.76	1.66	1.50	1.49	1.40	1.32	1.37	1.36
West Anatolia	8 516 084					1.83	1.80	1.79	1.83	1.85	1.91	1.90	1.87	1.84	1.78	1.66	1.55	1.48	1.43	1.34	1.28	1.23
Ankara	5 910 320	2.83	2.04	2.07	1.90	1.68	1.66	1.65	1.68	1.71	1.77	1.77	1.74	1.72	1.65	1.54	1.43	1.34	1.29	1.21	1.16	1.11
Konya	2 343 409	3.57	2.70	2.64	3.00	2.14	2.12	2.13	2.18	2.18	2.26	2.21	2.19	2.13	2.08	1.95	1.85	1.81	1.76	1.65	1.60	1.53
Karaman	262 355	–	–	2.86	2.77	2.15	1.95	1.98	2.02	2.09	2.05	2.13	2.10	2.07	1.95	1.85	1.78	1.67	1.61	1.52	1.42	1.33
Mediterranean	11 028 175	3.50		2.37	2.43	2.20	2.18	2.14	2.23	2.24	2.32	2.29	2.24	2.18	2.08	1.96	1.84	1.77	1.72	1.58	1.56	1.48
Antalya	2 777 677	2.98	2.06	2.19	1.93	1.91	1.87	1.84	1.93	1.91	1.96	1.99	1.94	1.84	1.76	1.64	1.55	1.49	1.38	1.32	1.25	1.20
Isparta	445 303	2.77	2.11	2.02	2.04	1.76	1.66	1.66	1.72	1.71	1.76	1.73	1.72	1.78	1.64	1.56	1.46	1.43	1.40	1.34	1.28	1.22
Burdur	277 226	3.03	1.88	2.10	2.12	1.74	1.73	1.68	1.66	1.68	1.79	1.79	1.74	1.67	1.58	1.50	1.42	1.37	1.37	1.38	1.35	1.31
Adana	2 283 609	3.32	3.03	3.00	2.68	2.18	2.14	2.12	2.21	2.25	2.34	2.33	2.26	2.23	2.13	2.02	1.88	1.83	1.83	1.69	1.65	1.55
Mersin	1 956 428	3.54	2.55	2.60	2.38	2.03	2.04	2.00	2.12	2.12	2.21	2.17	2.15	2.09	2.03	1.87	1.78	1.72	1.69	1.56	1.52	1.42
Hatay	1 577 531	4.46	3.36	3.16	2.97	2.57	2.54	2.51	2.63	2.63	2.82	2.75	2.70	2.61	2.51	2.39	2.21	2.15	2.06	1.80	1.86	1.81
Kahramanmaraş	1 146 278	3.96	3.59	3.19	3.54	2.70	2.68	2.66	2.68	2.74	2.74	2.64	2.61	2.55	2.40	2.24	2.12	2.00	1.95	1.73	1.78	1.70
Osmaniye	564 123	–	–	–	2.95	2.55	2.57	2.40	2.51	2.51	2.59	2.50	2.43	2.40	2.27	2.22	2.04	1.93	1.99	1.82	1.84	1.73
Central Anatolia	4 164 985					2.16	2.08	2.06	2.07	2.06	2.14	2.09	2.05	1.99	1.89	1.80	1.69	1.62	1.57	1.46	1.43	1.34
Kırıkkale	282 830	–	–	2.30	2.39	1.77	1.70	1.60	1.59	1.65	1.69	1.72	1.70	1.69	1.60	1.54	1.43	1.39	1.33	1.24	1.24	1.14
Aksaray	441 136	–	–	2.99	2.85	2.42	2.35	2.34	2.30	2.30	2.36	2.31	2.24	2.20	2.14	2.01	1.94	1.88	1.86	1.72	1.66	1.49
Niğde	374 492	4.50	3.22	3.21	2.98	2.40	2.28	2.23	2.32	2.25	2.33	2.19	2.20	2.08	2.00	1.93	1.77	1.73	1.69	1.59	1.54	1.47
Nevşehir	320 150	3.55	2.62	2.34	2.55	2.10	1.98	1.97	1.98	1.95	2.10	1.98	1.94	1.88	1.79	1.68	1.63	1.58	1.52	1.41	1.39	1.32
Kırşehir	242 777	3.65	2.67	2.28	2.40	1.72	1.69	1.69	1.75	1.78	1.86	1.82	1.79	1.77	1.73	1.66	1.49	1.40	1.38	1.30	1.24	1.22
Kayseri	1 458 991	3.73	2.97	2.61	2.62	2.21	2.14	2.16	2.18	2.17	2.25	2.20	2.14	2.04	1.97	1.86	1.72	1.66	1.61	1.47	1.46	1.38
Sivas	631 401	3.62	3.29	2.82	2.76	2.07	2.02	1.99	1.99	1.94	1.99	1.98	1.96	1.94	1.78	1.73	1.64	1.56	1.46	1.39	1.35	1.24
Yozgat	413 208	3.66	2.96	2.99	2.84	2.25	2.07	2.04	2.03	1.98	2.08	2.09	2.01	1.99	1.84	1.73	1.65	1.55	1.51	1.40	1.38	1.23
West Black Sea	4 716 187					1.84	1.79	1.74	1.77	1.76	1.77	1.73	1.69	1.67	1.63	1.57	1.47	1.42	1.36	1.28	1.27	1.21
Zonguldak	585 203	4.02	2.59	2.31	1.93	1.71	1.65	1.58	1.62	1.59	1.60	1.56	1.50	1.49	1.43	1.39	1.31	1.27	1.19	1.14	1.15	1.11
Karabük	249 614	–	–	–	1.99	1.67	1.60	1.62	1.54	1.59	1.56	1.57	1.46	1.51	1.49	1.42	1.29	1.33	1.22	1.14	1.20	1.14
Bartın	206 663	–	–	2.31	2.11	1.68	1.67	1.61	1.50	1.57	1.69	1.59	1.55	1.45	1.48	1.43	1.38	1.25	1.26	1.14	1.12	1.09
Kastamonu	379 934	3.44	2.47	2.65	2.18	1.70	1.69	1.64	1.69	1.68	1.59	1.63	1.59	1.51	1.54	1.48	1.41	1.39	1.40	1.28	1.32	1.28
Çankırı	200 549	4.07	2.81	2.61	2.27	1.97	1.93	1.91	1.84	1.78	1.87	1.79	1.84	1.76	1.69	1.69	1.67	1.69	1.51	1.43	1.37	1.28
Sinop	225 848	4.35	3.39	3.38	2.48	1.91	1.81	1.77	1.84	1.75	1.79	1.73	1.71	1.71	1.62	1.62	1.57	1.47	1.42	1.31	1.30	1.25
Samsun	1 392 403	3.73	2.71	2.73	2.55	1.87	1.81	1.77	1.83	1.83	1.85	1.82	1.80	1.78	1.75	1.65	1.51	1.43	1.38	1.33	1.34	1.24
Tokat	614 141	3.71	3.15	2.93	3.06	1.95	1.92	1.83	1.79	1.82	1.83	1.74	1.70	1.67	1.64	1.61	1.47	1.43	1.40	1.35	1.29	1.22
Çorum	519 590	4.05	2.92	3.06	2.66	1.93	1.90	1.86	1.96	1.89	1.97	1.85	1.87	1.80	1.74	1.69	1.58	1.52	1.45	1.33	1.30	1.22
Amasya	342 242	3.91	2.38	2.55	2.34	1.80	1.75	1.71	1.75	1.78	1.75	1.80	1.70	1.72	1.66	1.60	1.48	1.46	1.39	1.31	1.22	1.26
East Black Sea	2 699 769					1.86	1.81	1.77	1.78	1.77	1.81	1.78	1.77	1.73	1.69	1.61	1.53	1.46	1.40	1.35	1.30	1.23
Trabzon	823 323	3.25	2.41	2.23	2.10	1.87	1.82	1.78	1.80	1.79	1.84	1.86	1.85	1.82	1.80	1.68	1.56	1.53	1.43	1.39	1.33	1.28
Ordu	768 087	3.36	2.56	2.60	2.81	1.94	1.89	1.84	1.86	1.85	1.89	1.83	1.84	1.81	1.73	1.67	1.56	1.44	1.44	1.35	1.33	1.25
Giresun	455 074	4.03	2.78	2.58	2.31	1.74	1.74	1.65	1.66	1.64	1.65	1.64	1.57	1.56	1.55	1.49	1.41	1.34	1.32	1.28	1.24	1.14
Rize	346 947	3.48	2.32	2.33	2.01	1.80	1.76	1.75	1.73	1.80	1.79	1.79	1.80	1.76	1.77	1.66	1.57	1.53	1.41	1.40	1.32	1.28
Artvin	167 531	3.36	2.80	2.59	2.24	1.73	1.72	1.67	1.78	1.73	1.78	1.74	1.77	1.73	1.65	1.60	1.58	1.40	1.40	1.29	1.26	1.23
Gümüşhane	138 807	3.63	3.48	2.98	2.92	2.09	1.88	1.89	1.84	1.84	1.84	1.73	1.62	1.38	1.34	1.36	1.40	1.38	1.33	1.25	1.33	1.14
Northeast Anatolia	2 115 281					2.91	2.97	2.90	2.90	2.85	2.90	2.79	2.72	2.64	2.45	2.36	2.19	2.11	1.93	1.75	1.68	1.61
Erzurum	736 877	4.42	3.90	3.59	3.51	2.51	2.49	2.50	2.50	2.49	2.60	2.52	2.45	2.41	2.24	2.16	2.02	1.95	1.80	1.68	1.56	1.49
Erzincan	239 625	3.92	2.65	2.12	2.54	1.82	1.82	1.91	1.88	1.90	1.82	1.82	1.89	1.73	1.64	1.65	1.53	1.58	1.39	1.34	1.35	1.30
Bayburt	82 836	–	–	2.97	3.29	2.38	2.31	2.16	2.30	2.13	2.18	2.09	1.96	1.83	1.84	1.71	1.61	1.60	1.42	1.35	1.30	1.19
Ağrı	491 489	4.97	4.42	5.31	5.49	4.22	4.38	4.13	4.11	4.01	4.04	3.84	3.73	3.63	3.29	3.19	2.89	2.74	2.53	2.21	2.17	2.05
Kars	268 991	4.91	3.84	3.64	3.76	2.90	3.05	2.88	2.92	2.74	2.75	2.64	2.59	2.54	2.35	2.25	2.11	1.98	1.87	1.68	1.61	1.59
Iğdır	205 071	–	–	3.64	4.17	3.06	3.16	3.12	3.10	3.21	3.19	3.05	2.98	2.82	2.70	2.57	2.28	2.22	2.01	1.79	1.69	1.61
Ardahan	90 392	–	–	3.64	2.95	2.35	2.25	2.25	2.21	2.11	2.24	2.17	2.01	2.05	1.91	1.88	1.75	1.82	1.64	1.46	1.45	1.39
Central East Anatolia	3 870 158					3.00	2.95	2.85	2.82	2.82	2.87	2.75	2.67	2.65	2.52	2.43	2.23	2.12	2.02	1.82	1.79	1.69
Malatya	755 854	3.66	3.12	2.59	2.56	2.08	2.06	1.99	1.99	1.96	2.05	2.01	1.99	1.99	1.90	1.81	1.66	1.64	1.59	1.38	1.45	1.40
Elazığ	605 678	3.92	2.56	2.61	2.52	2.02	1.98	1.98	1.97	1.93	2.04	1.99	1.96	1.96	1.86	1.79	1.72	1.60	1.52	1.43	1.42	1.35
Bingöl	282 299	5.57	4.49	4.57	3.56	2.56	2.55	2.52	2.49	2.49	2.63	2.42	2.44	2.39	2.37	2.27	2.12	2.00	1.82	1.67	1.62	1.52
Tunceli	85 083	4.87	3.91	2.91	1.90	1.56	1.47	1.50	1.53	1.55	1.62	1.69	1.58	1.56	1.64	1.69	1.58	1.50	1.41	1.31	1.27	1.23
Van	1 112 013	5.17	4.91	5.53	6.00	3.93	3.84	3.66	3.58	3.64	3.54	3.37	3.20	3.15	2.96	2.85	2.56	2.35	2.29	2.03	1.98	1.87
Muş	389 127	5.52	4.18	5.36	4.18	3.93	3.94	3.66	3.65	3.59	3.71	3.49	3.37	3.42	3.25	3.17	2.86	2.78	2.55	2.25	2.24	2.01
Bitlis	360 423	6.01	4.95	5.92	5.03	3.80	3.71	3.52	3.49	3.44	3.47	3.40	3.30	3.23	3.07	2.90	2.71	2.65	2.49	2.22	2.15	2.05
Hakkâri	282 299	4.91	5.69	7.41	6.69	3.35	3.18	3.14	2.99	3.01	3.03	2.76	2.60	2.58	2.43	2.38	2.20	2.08	2.02	1.91	1.75	1.71
Southeast Anatolia	9 587 992	4.61		4.37	4.31	3.59	3.57	3.48	3.53	3.48	3.63	3.52	3.38	3.36	3.23	3.03	2.85	2.87	2.72	2.46	2.44	2.34
Gaziantep	2 222 415	4.43	3.83	3.63	3.83	3.15	3.07	3.04	3.15	3.17	3.28	3.19	3.06	2.94	2.86	2.63	2.48	2.49	2.41	2.12	2.13	2.00
Adıyaman	617 821	5.55	3.80	4.72	3.66	2.76	2.79	2.77	2.79	2.75	2.90	2.87	2.78	2.79	2.69	2.56	2.37	2.37	2.25	1.94	1.98	1.91
Kilis	157 363	–	–	–	3.54	2.93	3.01	2.83	2.99	2.96	3.13	3.03	2.87	2.84	2.76	2.57	2.50	2.48	2.36	2.08	2.05	1.84
Şanlıurfa	2 265 800	4.16	3.62	4.36	4.83	4.57	4.58	4.46	4.47	4.41	4.57	4.42	4.35	4.33	4.16	3.91	3.73	3.83	3.61	3.29	3.29	3.15
Diyarbakır	1.852 356	4.42	4.12	4.74	4.51	3.23	3.24	3.19	3.23	3.16	3.30	3.22	3.13	3.13	2.97	2.79	2.55	2.54	2.43	2.23	2.21	2.14
Mardin	903 576	5.15	4.29	5.59	4.98	3.46	3.53	3.35	3.46	3.33	3.55	3.46	3.26	3.29	3.16	3.01	2.78	2.80	2.64	2.41	2.33	2.23
Batman	662 626	–	–	5.79	5.27	3.70	3.64	3.43	3.42	3.34	3.41	3.25	3.11	3.08	2.91	2.72	2.56	2.57	2.40	2.18	2.12	2.00
Şırnak	573 666	–	–	5.83	7.06	4.69	4.51	4.26	4.21	4.19	4.27	4.09	3.51	3.76	3.63	3.40	3.25	3.20	2.96	2.74	2.63	2.53
Siirt	332 369	4.67	4.76	6.33	6.05	4.23	4.12	3.96	3.85	3.70	3.89	3.56	3.47	3.33	3.18	2.93	2.89	2.71	2.48	2.23	2.15	2.11

== Ethnicity ==
Modern Turkey was founded by Mustafa Kemal Atatürk as secular (Laiklik, Turkish adaptation of French Laïcité), i.e. without a state religion, or separate ethnic divisions/ identities. The concept of "minorities" has only been accepted by the Republic of Turkey as defined by the Treaty of Lausanne (1923) and thence strictly limited to Greeks, Jews and Armenians, only based on religious affiliation, excluding from the scope of the concept the ethnic identities of these minorities as of others such as the Kurds who make up 15% of the country; others include Assyrians of various Christian denominations, Alevis and all the others. Provisions of the Lausanne Treaty were extended to Bulgarians in Turkey by the Turkey-Bulgaria Friendship Treaty (Türkiye ve Bulgaristan Arasındaki Dostluk Antlaşması) of 18 October 1925. According to the Ministry of Foreign Affairs (Turkey), as of 2008, there were 89,000 Turkish citizens belonging to one of the three recognized minorities, two thirds of Armenian descent. On 18 June 2013, the Ankara 13th Circuit Administrative Court unanimously ruled that the Assyrians were included as beneficiaries of the Lausanne Treaty, so that Assyrians were allowed to open the first school teaching in their mother tongue.

The word Turk or Turkish also has a wider meaning in a historical context because, at times, especially in the past, it has been used to refer to all Muslim inhabitants of the Ottoman Empire irrespective of their ethnicity.

According to the 2016 edition of the CIA World Factbook, 70–75% of Turkey's population consists of Turkish people, with Kurds accounting for 19% and other minorities between 6 and 11%. According to Milliyet, a 2008 report prepared for the National Security Council of Turkey by academics of three Turkish universities in eastern Anatolia suggested that there are approximately 55 million ethnic Turks, 9.6 million Kurds, 3 million Zazas, 2.5 million Circassians, 2 million Bosniaks, 500,000–1.3 million Albanians, 1,000,000 Georgians, 870,000 Arabs, 600,000 Pomaks, 80,000 Laz, 60,000 Armenians, 30,000 British, 25,000 Assyrians, 20,000 Jews, 15,000 Greeks, and 500 Yazidis living in Turkey.

According to a survey published in 2022 by Konda Research, Turks make up 77% of the population, while 19% self-identify as Kurd. Arabs (Syrian refugees included) make up 2%, and other ethnic groups are 2% of the population.

Since the immigration to the big cities in the west of Turkey, interethnic marriage has become more common. A recent study estimates that there are 2,708,000 marriages between Turks and Kurds.

According to a survey done in March 2020 by Area Araştırma, 20.4% of the total population of Turkey claim to be Kurdish (either Kurmanji speaking or Zazaki speaking).

Ethnolinguistic estimates in 2014 by Ethnologue and Jacques Leclerc:

People	Population	Percentage	Language	Status
Anatolian Turks	53,402,000	70.6%	Turkish	1 (National)
Kurmanji Kurds	8,127,000	10.7%	Kurmanji	3 (Wider communication)
Turcophones, Kurds	5,881,000	7.7%	Turkish	1 (National)
Zaza	1,155,000	1.5%	Zaza	5 (Developing)
Arabs	1,133,000	1.4%	Levantine Arabic	
Kabardians, Circassians	1,062,000	1.4 %	Kabardian	5 (Developing)
Iraqi Arabs	722,000	0.9%	Mesopotamian Arabic	6a (Vigorous)
Azerbaijani	540,000	0.7%	Azerbaijani	5 (Developing)
Romani	500,000 (1985)	0.7%	Romani, Domari	
Gagauzes	418,000	0.5%	Balkan Gagauz Turkish	7 (Shifting)
Pomaks	351,000	0.4%	Bulgarian	5 (Dispersed)
Pontic Greeks	321,000	0.4%	Pontic Greek	6a (Vigorous)
Adyghe, Circassians	316,000	0.4%	Adyghe	5 (Developing)
Alevi Kurds	184,000	0.2%	Zazaki	
Georgians	151,000	0,1 %	Georgian	6b (Threatened)
Bosniaks	101,000	0.1%	Bosnian	
Chechens	101,000	0.1%	Chechen	
Crimean Tatars	100,000	0.1%	Crimean Tatar	5 (Developing)
Lazi	93,000	0.1%	Laz language	6b (Threatened)
Karakalpaks	74,000		Karakalpak	
Albanians	66,000		Tosk Albanian	6b (Threatened)
Armenians	61,000		Armenian	6b (Threatened)
Abkhazians	44,000		Abkhazian	6b (Threatened)
Han Chinese	38,000		Chinese	
Ossetians	37,000		Ossetian	
British	35,000		English	
Bulgarians	32,000		Bulgarian	
Jews	30,000		Turkish, Ladino	7 (Shifting)
Tatars	26,000		Tatar	
Assyrians	25,000		Neo-Aramaic	
Pakistanis	22,000		Urdu	
Assyrians	15,000		Turoyo	6b (Threatened)
Turks other (Hemshin, Meskhetian Turks, Gajal)	57,000		Turkish	
Kurds other (Herki and Shikaki)	62,000		Kurdish	
Other	180,000			
Total	75,566,800			

== Historical controversy ==
Ethnodemography in Turkey is politically contentious in significant part because demographic knowledge became historically entangled with the creation of the modern nation-state. Population statistics were used not only to describe communities but also to determine political representation, territorial claims, assimilation policy, deportation, and, in the Armenian case, genocidal demographic transformation.

The Turkish government has stated that it "does not collect, maintain or use either qualitative or quantitative data on ethnicity", explaining that it emphasizes commonalities rather than "measuring differences and making policies thereon". The UN Committee on the Elimination of Racial Discrimination (CERD) has expressed concern about the resulting lack of statistical data, while recording Turkey's position that constitutional principles prevent the state from identifying ethnic groups in censuses.

European anti-discrimination reports describe similar restrictions. A 2022 report for the European Commission states that official ethnic data are no longer publicly available and describes their collection as de jure prohibited, citing a Ministry of the Interior circular restricting public institutions from producing statistics on race and ethnicity. An Istanbul Bilgi University report likewise states that a Ministry circular issued in the 1990s prohibited the State Institute of Statistics from collecting statistics based on region and ethnic origin. ECRI reported in 2025 that the precise number of Roma remains unknown because Turkish authorities do not collect ethnicity-based population statistics, and recommended equality-data collection based on informed consent, self-identification, and confidentiality. ECRI had already reported in 2011 that Turkey lacked a "coherent, comprehensive system of data collection" concerning minority groups and discrimination.

Historical scholarship places this sensitivity within a longer history of population policy. Historian Fuat Dündar argues that the census "is itself a political activity, subjective in nature", because decisions about which identities are measured and how they are classified are connected to state power. In the late Ottoman Armenian case, population ratios were tied to questions of political representation, reform, and territory. Dündar characterizes the statistical work surrounding the Armenian Question as "ethnic engineering" which eventually became "the reason, as well as the vehicle" for Young Turk policy.

Taner Akçam similarly places demographic policy at the center of the Armenian genocide. He argues that the demographic restructuring of Anatolia and fear of the 1914 Armenian reforms were intertwined, and that policies restricting dispersed minority populations to approximately five to ten percent of local populations "laid the groundwork" for genocide. He argues that these numerical ceilings could ultimately be achieved only through destruction, and concludes that Ottoman records demonstrate that "the genocide was implemented as a demographic policy".

The political character of demographic measurement during the Ottoman Empire continued during the establishment of the Republic of Turkey. Dündar argues that early Republican censuses sought to establish the "real number of Turks in Turkey" and that the 1927 census, which found a substantial non-Turkophone population, was followed by campaigns of linguistic assimilation such as "Citizen, Speak Turkish!" Linguistic data from the 1970, 1975, 1980, and 1985 censuses were not published, and Dündar argues that the state ceased publication as such information became politically useful to minority movements. A Library of Congress country study similarly states that Kurds were statistically obscured under categories such as "Mountain Turks" and reports that officials were prosecuted after preparing instructions allowing Kurdish to be recorded in the 1985 census.

The issue also intersects with historical memory and genocide denial. Fatma Müge Göçek describes a "Republican Defensive Narrative" that explicitly denies the Armenian genocide and contrasts it with scholarship concerned with silences in Turkish history and the country's ethnic composition. Üngör similarly describes a conflict of collective memory in which "Armenians wish to remember a history that Turks would like to forget".

The European Court of Human Rights has also documented the sensitivity of public discussion of 1915. In Altuğ Taner Akçam v. Turkey, the Court found that Turkish case law could expose persons expressing "unfavourable" views about the Armenian question to a "considerable risk of prosecution", producing a chilling effect on freedom of expression. ECRI likewise reported that peaceful minority identities could be perceived as threats to state unity and noted the sensitivity of political statements concerning Armenian genocide claims.

== Languages ==
No exact data are available concerning the different ethnic groups in Turkey. The last census data according to language date from 1965 and major changes may have occurred since then. However, it is clear that the Turkish are in the majority, while the largest minority groups are Kurds and Arabs. Smaller minorities are the Armenians, Greeks and others.

Language	Census 1927		Census 1935		Census 1945		Census 1950		Census 1955		Census 1960		Census 1965	
Language	Number	%	Number	%	Number	%	Number	%	Number	%	Number	%	Number	%
Turkish	11,778,810	86.42	13,899,073	86.02	16,598,037	88.34	18,254,851	87.15	21,622,292	89.85	25,172,535	90.70	28,175,579	89.76
Kurdish	1,184,446	8.69	1,480,246	9.16	1,476,562	7.9	1,680,043	8.02	1,679,265	6.98	1,847,674	6.66	2,219,599	7.07
Zazaki	1,184,446	8.69	1,480,246	9.16	1,476,562	7.9	174,526	0.70	1,679,265	6.98	1,847,674	6.66	150,644	0.48
Arabic	134,273	0.98	153,687	0.95	247,294	1.3	269,038	1.28	300,583	1.25	347,690	1.25	365,340	1.16
Circassian	95,901	0.70	91,972	0.57	66,691	0.4	75,837	0.36	77,611	0.32	63,137	0.23	58,339	0.19
Greek	119,822	0.88	108,725	0.67	88,680	0.47	89,472	0.43	79,691	0.33	65,139	0.23	48,096	0.15
Armenian	64,745	0.48	57,599	0.36	47,728	0.3	52,776	0.25	56,235	0.23	52,756	0.19	33,094	0.11
Georgian	–	–	57,325	0.35	40,076	0.21	72,604	0.35	51,983	0.22	32,944	0.12	34,330	0.11
Laz	–	–	63,253	0.39	39,323	0.21	70,423	0.34	30,566	0.13	21,703	0.08	26,007	0.08
other	251,491	1.85	227,544	1.41	185,783	0.99	207,618	0.99	166,537	0.69	151,242	0.54	280,403	0.89
Total	13,629.488	100	16,157,450	100	18,790,174	100	20,947,188	100	24,064,763	100	27,754,820	100	31,391,421	100

A possible list of ethnic groups living in Turkey could be as follows:

1. Turkic-speaking peoples: Turks, Azerbaijanis, Volga Tatars, Karachays, Uzbeks, Crimean Tatars, Kyrgyzs and Uyghurs
2. Indo-European-speaking peoples: Kurds, Zazas, Bosniaks, Albanians, Pomaks, Ossetians, Armenians, Roma, Megleno-Romanians, Hamshenis, Goranis and Greeks
3. Semitic-speaking peoples: Arabs, and Assyrians
4. Caucasian-speaking peoples: Circassians, Georgians, Lazs and Chechens
5. Ethnoreligious with different languages (e.g. Ladino): Jews

== Religion ==
Turkey has officially been a secular country since its 1924 constitution was amended in 1928. This was later strengthened and entrenched with the wider appliance of laicism by founder Atatürk during the mid-1930s, as part of the Republican reforms.

There are no official statistics of people's religious beliefs nor is it asked in the census. According to the United States Department of State's International Religious Freedom Report 2008, the Turkish government considers 99 percent of the population is Muslim, the majority of which is Hanafi Sunni. A similar figure can be found in the current US Central Intelligence Agency (CIA) the World Factbook (99.8%). The remaining 0.2% is other – mostly Christians and Jews. However, these are based on the existing religion information written on every citizen's national ID card, that is automatically passed on from the parents to every newborn, and do not necessarily represent individual choice. Religious records can be changed or even blanked on the request of citizen, by filing an e-government application since May 2020, using a valid electronic signature to sign the electronic application. Any change in religion records additionally results in a new ID card being issued. Any change in religion record also leaves a permanent trail in the census record, however, record of change of religion is not accessible except for the citizen in question, next-of-kins of the citizen in question, the citizenship administration and courts.

In 2023, according to Ipsos, 83% are Muslim, 12% have no religion, 2% prefer not to say, 2% are Christian and 2% are other religions. In a similar survey in 2016, Islam comprised 82% of the total population, followed by 7% no religion, 6% Spiritual but not religious, 2% Christian, 1% Buddhist and 1% other.

In 2018, a poll conducted by Eurobarometer and KONDA Research and Consultancy and some other research institutes showed that 3% of those interviewed had no religion. In 2013, the same institutions showed that around 0.5% of the population had no religion.

Between 8 million and 20 million Turks are Alevis.

In 2006, in a poll conducted by Sabancı University, 98.3% of Turks revealed they were Muslim. In 2005, a Eurobarometer poll on Europeans views on ethics in science and technology reported 95% of Turkish citizens answered that "they believe there is a God", while about 2% responded "I believe there is some sort of spirit or life force", about 1% that "they do not believe there is any sort of spirit, God, or life force" and about 1% "DK" (that they don't know). Similar figures were found in some other European countries.

There is concern over the future of the Greek Orthodox Patriarchate, which suffers from a lack of trained clergy due to the closure of the Halki seminary. The state does not recognise the Ecumenical status of the Patriarch of Constantinople.

Muslim and non-Muslim population in Turkey, 1914–2005 (in thousands)
Year	1914	1927	1945	1965	1990	2005
Muslims	12,941	13,290	18,511	31,139	56,860	71,997
Greeks	1,549	110	104	76	8	3
Armenians	1,204	77	60	64	67	50
Jews	128	82	77	38	29	27
Others	176	71	38	74	50	45
Total	15,997	13,630	18,790	31,391	57,005	72,120
Percentage non-Muslim	19.1	2.5	1.5	0.8	0.3	0.2

The percentage of non-Muslims in Turkey fell from 19.1% in 1914 to 2.5% percent in 1927. The drop was the result of the late Ottoman genocides, the population exchange between Greece and Turkey and the emigration of Christians. The 1942 Wealth Tax on non-Muslims, the emigration of many of Turkish Jews to Israel after 1948, and the 1955 Istanbul pogrom further contributed to the decline of Turkey's non-Muslim population.

=== Religiosity ===
In 2018, according to a KONDA survey, the religiosity was the following:

- 51% defined themselves as "a religious person who strives to fulfill religious obligations" (Religious)
- 34% defined themselves as "a believer who does not fulfill religious obligations" (Not religious).
- 10% defined themselves as "a fully devout person fulfilling all religious obligations" (Fully devout).
- 2% defined themselves as "someone who does not believe in religious obligations" (Non-believer).
- 3% defined themselves as "someone with no religious conviction" (Atheist).

Among those aged between 15 and 29 years old:

- 43% defined themselves as "a religious person who strives to fulfill religious obligations" (Religious)
- 45% defined themselves as "a believer who does not fulfill religious obligations" (Not religious).
- 5% defined themselves as "a fully devout person fulfilling all religious obligations" (Fully devout).
- 4% defined themselves as "someone who does not believe in religious obligations" (Non-believer).
- 4% defined themselves as "someone with no religious conviction" (Atheist).

According to the 2007 KONDA survey:

- 52.8% defined themselves as "a religious person who strives to fulfill religious obligations" (Religious)
- 34.3 % defined themselves as "a believer who does not fulfill religious obligations" (Not religious).
- 9.7% defined themselves as "a fully devout person fulfilling all religious obligations" (Fully devout).
- 2.3% defined themselves as "someone who does not believe in religious obligations" (Non-believer).
- 0.9% defined themselves as "someone with no religious conviction" (Atheist).

In a 2006 Pew Research Center survey, 69% of Turkey's Muslims said that "religion is very important in their lives". Based on the Gallup Poll 2006–08, Turkey was defined as More religious, in which over 63 percent of people believe religion is important.

Around 2007, according to the Turkish Economic and Social Studies Foundation, 62% of women wore the headscarf or hijab in Turkey.

=== Headscarf ===
The survey reported that 44.5% of women who lived in metropolitan areas wore the headscarf, increasing to 62.8% in towns and 74.1% in the countryside. There was also an increase in the percentage of women wearing headscarves going from west to east across the country.

Headscarf Usage by Age Group in Turkey (KONDA, 2013)
Age Group	Percentage Wearing Headscarf (%)
18–27	43.8%
28–43	65.4%
44+	76.1%

Headscarf Usage by Education Level in Turkey (KONDA, 2013)
Education Level	Percentage Wearing Headscarf (%)
University graduate	11.3%
High school	24.5%
Middle school	56.1%
Elementary school	79.7%
Not completed elementary school	90.8%

Headscarf Usage by Region in Turkey (KONDA, 2013)
Region	Percentage Wearing Headscarf (%)
Aegean	50.3%
Marmara (includes Istanbul)	51.2%
Mediterranean Coast	54.8%
Central Anatolia	67.4%
Eastern Anatolia	70.3%
Eastern Black Sea Coast	74.5%
South East (mainly Kurdish areas)	84.6%

== Migration ==
=== Immigration ===
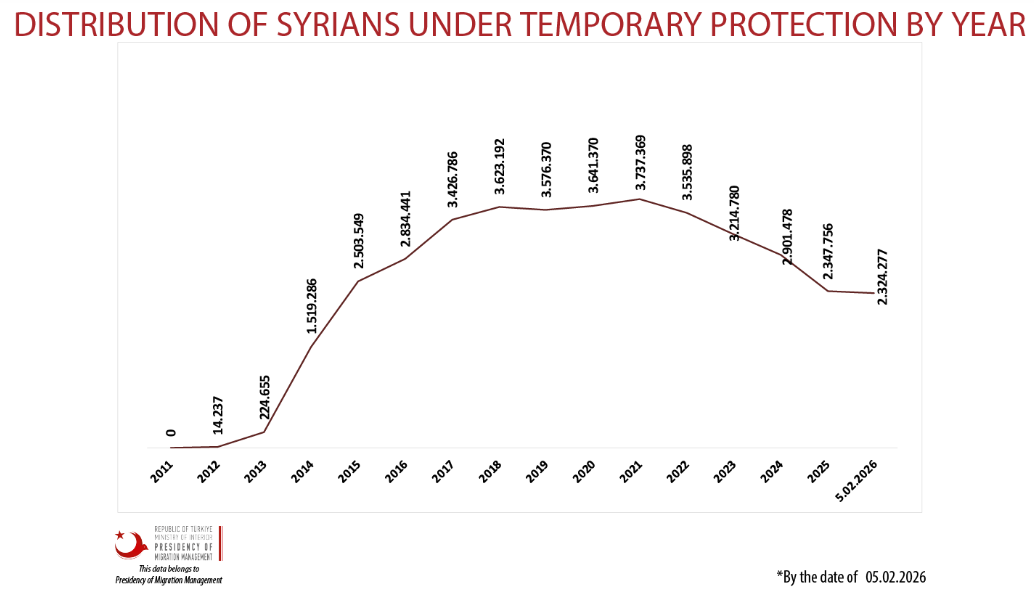
Registered Syrian refugees under temporary protection status over years

Immigration to Turkey is the process by which people migrate to Turkey to reside in the country. After the dissolution of the Ottoman Empire following Turkish War of Independence, and The 1923 Population exchange between Greece and Turkey, exodus by the large portion of Turkish (Turkic) and Muslim peoples from the Balkans (Balkan Turks, Albanians, Bosniaks, Pomaks), Caucasus (Abkhazians, Ajarians, Circassians, Chechens, Lezgins), Crimea (Crimean Tatar diaspora), and Crete (Cretan Turks) took refuge in present-day Turkey and moulded the country's fundamental features. Trends of immigration towards Turkey continue to this day, although the motives are more varied and are usually in line with the patterns of global immigration movements — Turkey, for example, receives many economic migrants from nearby countries such as Armenia, Moldova, Georgia, Iran, and Azerbaijan, but also from Central Asia, Ukraine and Russia. Turkey's migrant crisis during the 2010s saw high numbers of people arriving in Turkey, particularly those fleeing the Syrian civil war.

In 2022, nearly 100,000 Russian citizens migrated to Turkey, becoming the first in the list of foreigners who moved to Turkey, meaning an increase of more than 218% from 2021.

In order to obtain Turkish citizenship there is a range of legal grounds, which can include: reunification with their family, marriage to a Turkish citizen, for the purchase of real estate worth $400,000 from a Turkish citizen or company. The minimum investment amount was increased in May 2022, previously it was enough to invest $250,000. Also the basis is to work in Turkey, training, business, medical treatment, refugee status. More than 240,000 Syrian citizens acquired Turkish citizenship since 2011.

Population in Turkey by country of citizenship at the end of each years:

Country of Citizenship	2025	2024	2023	2022	2021	2020
Total people living in Turkey^{1}	86 092 168 (100%)	85 664 944 (100%)	85 372 377 (100%)	85 279 553 (100%)	84 680 273 (100%)	83 614 362 (100%)
Turkey	84 572 653 (98.24%)	84 184 397 (98.27%)	83 801 834 (98.16%)	83 455 717 (97.86%)	82 888 237 (97.88%)	82 280 952 (98.41%)
Total foreign population^{1}	1 519 515 (1.76%)	1 480 547 (1.73%)	1 570 543 (1.84%)	1 823 836 (2.14%)	1 792 036 (2.12%)	1 333 410 (1.59%)
Turkmenistan	170 411 (0.20%)	113 762 (0.13%)	110 349 (0.13%)	116 447 (0.14%)	123 965 (0.15%)	91 218 (0.11%)
Iraq	147 469 (0.17%)	177 988 (0.21%)	217 476 (0.25%)	275 305 (0.32%)	322 015 (0.38%)	281 074 (0.34%)
Afghanistan	132 707 (0.15%)	139 251 (0.16%)	164 131 (0.19%)	186 160 (0.22%)	183 567 (0.22%)	158 252 (0.19%)
Germany	111 218 (0.13%)	115 958 (0.14%)	114 293 (0.13%)	110 453 (0.13%)	102 592 (0.12%)	92 284 (0.11%)
Azerbaijan	92 830 (0.11%)	80 133 (0.09%)	70 971 (0.08%)	68 884 (0.08%)	68 562(0.08%)	48 495 (0.06%)
Iran	91 672 (0.11%)	95 924 (0.11%)	101 164 (0.12%)	117 026 (0.14%)	128 883 (0.15%)	68 561 (0.08%)
Russian Federation	75 914 (0.09%)	85 752 (0.10%)	102 585 (0.12%)	151 049 (0.18%)	66 786 (0.08%)	43 679 (0.05%)
Syria	75 202 (0.09%)	72 367 (0.08%)	79 952 (0.09%)	99 360 (0.12%)	104 554 (0.12%)	88 907 (0.11%)
Uzbekistan	64 298 (0.07%)	59 132 (0.07%)	54 594 (0.06%)	61 754 (0.07%)	71 145 (0.08%)	36 510 (0.04%)
Egypt	43 271 (0.05%)	28 304 (0.03%)	28 451 (0.03%)	33 040 (0.04%)	34 162 (0.04%)	25 475 (0.03%)
Kazakhstan	42 592 (0.05%)	44 445 (0.05%)	44 133 (0.05%)	45 530 (0.05%)	39 454 (0.05%)	23 645 (0.03%)
Ukraine	35 744 (0.04%)	35 446 (0.04%)	40 483 (0.05%)	50 357 (0.06%)	23 377 (0.03%)	17 505 (0.02%)
Kyrgyzstan	24 815 (0.03%)	23 802 (0.03%)	22 477 (0.03%)	24 485 (0.03%)	26 541 (0.03%)	18 019 (0.02%)
Palestine	24 478 (0.03%)	23 569 (0.03%)	21 612 (0.03%)	26 278 (0.03%)	28 027 (0.03%)	17 915 (0.02%)
Austria	22 374 (0.03%)	22 231 (0.03%)	22 102 (0.03%)	21 311 (0.02%)	19 900 (0.02%)	18 047 (0.02%)
Indonesia	21 488 (0.02%)	16 089 (0.02%)	12 301 (0.01%)	11 280 (0.01%)	10 219 (0.01%)	5 226 (0.01%)
Pakistan	18 660 (0.02%)	14 384 (0.02%)	13 903 (0.02%)	16 505 (0.02%)	17 290 (0.02%)	7 248 (0.01%)
Bulgaria	17 468 (0.02%)	17 315 (0.02%)	16 899 (0.02%)	16 612 (0.02%)	15 426 (0.02%)	14 195 (0.02%)
Morocco	17 268 (0.02%)	16 914 (0.02%)	16 699 (0.02%)	18 482 (0.02%)	20 520 (0.02%)	12 122 (0.01%)
China	15 047 (0.02%)	15 107 (0.02%)	14 030 (0.02%)	16 880 (0.02%)	20 486 (0.02%)	18 740 (0.02%)
Greece	14 560 (0.02%)	14 496 (0.02%)	14 164 (0.02%)	13 583 (0.02%)	12 569 (0.01%)	12 137 (0.01%)
Yemen	14 068 (0.02%)	14 748 (0.02%)	16 386 (0.02%)	19 099 (0.02%)	18 094 (0.02%)	14 927 (0.02%)
United Kingdom	13 386 (0.02%)	14 386 (0.02%)	15 734 (0.02%)	17 193 (0.02%)	16 440 (0.02%)	13 985 (0.02%)
Jordan	11 431 (0.01%)	14 343 (0.02%)	17 098 (0.02%)	22 733 (0.03%)	23 656 (0.03%)	14 260 (0.02%)
Libya	11 527 (0.01%)	11 644 (0.01%)	15 621 (0.02%)	21 677 (0.03%)	24 188 (0.03%)	18 607 (0.02%)
Somalia	7 916 (<0.01%)	10 815 (0.01%)	14 011 (0.02%)	20 906 (0.02%)	28 081 (0.03%)	17 245 (0.02%)
Georgia	9 910 (0.01%)	10 725 (0.01%)	11 851 (0.01%)	14 680 (0.02%)	19 276 (0.02%)	15 661 (0.02%)
Algeria	9 328 (0.01%)	9 815 (0.01%)	10 145 (0.01%)	12 248 (0.01%)	10 698 (0.01%)	5 914 (0.01%)
Sudan	9 574 (0.01%)	9 632 (0.01%)	10 371 (0.01%)	11 613 (0.01%)	9 538 (0.01%)	3 193 (<0.01%)
India	9 271 (0.01%)	7 639 (0.01%)	6 699 (0.01%)	4 669 (0.01%)	3 092 (<0.01%)	
United States	8 840 (0.01%)	9 621 (0.01%)	10 655 (0.01%)	12 793 (0.02%)	12 773 (0.02%)	9 032 (0.01%)
Netherlands	7 573 (<0.01%)	7 587 (0.01%)	7 786 (0.01%)	8 104 (0.01%)	7 686 (0.01%)	6 550 (0.01%)
Tajikistan	5 824 (<0.01%)	6 486 (0.01%)	6 251 (0.01%)	7 153 (0.01%)	7 965 (0.01%)	3 626 (<0.01%)
Kuwait	5 723 (<0.01%)	5 912 (0.01%)	5 699 (0.01%)	6 190 (0.01%)	5 498 (0.01%)	3 559 (<0.01%)
Nigeria	5 613 (<0.01%)	7 252 (0.01%)	9 196 (0.01%)	12 928 (0.02%)	12 920 (0.02%)	7 120 (0.01%)
Lebanon	5 491 (<0.01%)	7 340 (0.01%)	8 864 (0.01%)	12 430 (0.01%)	13 242 (0.02%)	5 943 (0.01%)
Tunisia	4 782 (<0.01%)	5 105 (0.01%)	5 172 (0.01%)	6 075 (0.01%)	6 033 (0.01%)	2 961 (<0.01%)
Moldova	4 754 (<0.01%)	5 257 (0.01%)	5 842 (0.01%)	6 790 (0.01%)	7 546 (0.01%)	6 295 (0.01%)
France	4 268 (<0.01%)	4 237 (<0.01%)	4 102 (<0.01%)	4 526 (0.01%)	4 294 (0.01%)	3 181 (<0.01%)
Belarus	3 828 (<0.01%)	4 207 (<0.01%)	4 440 (0.01%)	5 169 (0.01%)	3 873 (<0.01%)	
Chad	3 099 (<0.01%)	2 599 (<0.01%)				
Ethiopia	2 718 (<0.01%)	3 036 (<0.01%)	3 724 (<0.01%)	6 165 (0.01%)	6 633 (0.01%)	2 936 (<0.01%)
^{1: excluding Syrian refugees under temporary protection status and foreigners holding visas or residence permits shorter than 90 days}

=== Net migration ===
Net Migration Data for Turkey (2016–present)
Year	Total Immigration	Total Emigration	Total Net Migration	Turkish Immigration	Turkish Emigration	Turkish Net Migration	Foreign Immigration	Foreign Emigration	Foreign Net Migration
2016	380,921	177,960	202,961	107,052	69,326	37,726	273,869	108,634	165,235
2017	466,333	253,640	212,693	101,772	113,326	−11,554	364,561	140,314	224,247
2018	577,457	323,918	253,539	110,567	136,740	−26,743	466,890	187,178	279,712
2019	677,042	320,289	346,753	98,554	84,863	13,691	578,488	245,426	333,062
2020	340,845	420,643	−79,618	98,349	77,310	20,539	242,496	342,653	−100,157
2021	739,364	287,651	451,713	124,269	103,613	20,656	615,095	184,038	431,057
2022	494,052	466,914	27,138	94,409	139,531	−45,122	399,643	327,383	72,260
2023	316,456	714,579	−398,123	101,677	291,377	−189,700	214,779	432,202	−208,423
2024	314,588	424,345	−109,757	103,732	151,140	−47,408	210,856	273,205	−62,349
2025	393,829	403,216	−9,387	91,952	155,119	−63,167	301,877	248,097	53,780

=== Internal migration ===
Place of origin (rows) versus place of residence (columns) for Turkish citizens in 2025
Regions	İstanbul	West Marmara	Aegean	East Marmara	West Anatolia	Mediterranean	Central Anatolia	West Black Sea	East Black Sea	Northeast Anatolia	Central East Anatolia	Southeast Anatolia	Total Population
İstanbul	2,123,134	120,795	103,055	118,844	41,493	48,240	6,262	17.106	12,263	3,397	3,476	5,805	2,603,870
West Marmara	486,647	2,360,931	212,951	157,230	50,175	33,025	5,576	11,125	4,931	4,053	5,187	8,402	3,340,233
Aegean	320,890	96,410	7,115,840	265,097	160,831	200,381	19,784	25,214	10,736	13,394	18,820	30,220	8,277,617
East Marmara	512,748	83,333	160,299	4,499,368	203,320	73,370	12,458	37,503	12,397	7,626	8,006	12,856	5,623,284
West Anatolia	315,407	46,465	300,199	166,128	3,922,450	238,107	62,782	35,984	9,623	10,132	12,990	27,332	5,147,599
Mediterranean	555,427	83,215	347,210	181,564	332,367	7,706,259	149,506	49,469	23,966	24,336	50,247	221,848	9,725,414
Central Anatolia	1,399,209	129,572	368,413	318,249	1,384,089	350,661	3,555,276	91,791	21,989	22,138	32,121	47,044	7,720,552
West Black Sea	2,623,436	274,920	321,185	617,775	1,082,399	166,789	68,158	4,033,262	56,455	22,650	23,569	36,679	9,327,277
East Black Sea	1,958,444	128,161	189,236	658,065	277,119	88,185	24,075	225,449	2,430,035	40,737	12,295	17,026	6,048,827
Northeast Anatolia	1,797,590	213,391	636,267	815,266	420,222	131,556	80,331	50,198	47,699	1,876,652	46,190	27,326	6,142,688
Central East Anatolia	1,560,192	176,022	500,180	489,089	240,461	486,081	47,623	37,065	20,273	42,048	3,446,904	158,901	7,204,839
Southeast Anatolia	1,493,653	114,599	627,451	313.796	241,763	1,296,872	61,023	43,921	22,162	34,588	195,491	8,965,134	13,410,453
Foreign National	607,276	41,153	128,975	158,785	159,395	208,649	72,131	58,100	27,240	13,530	14,862	29,419	1,519,515
Total population	15,754,053	3,868,967	11,011,261	8,759,256	8,516,084	11,028,175	4,164,985	4,716,187	2,699,769	2,115,281	3,870,158	9,587,992	86,092,168

View source data.
View source data.
View source data.
View source data.

== See also ==
- Provinces of Turkey by population
- Census in Turkey
- Minorities in Turkey
