= List of lakes of Ukraine =

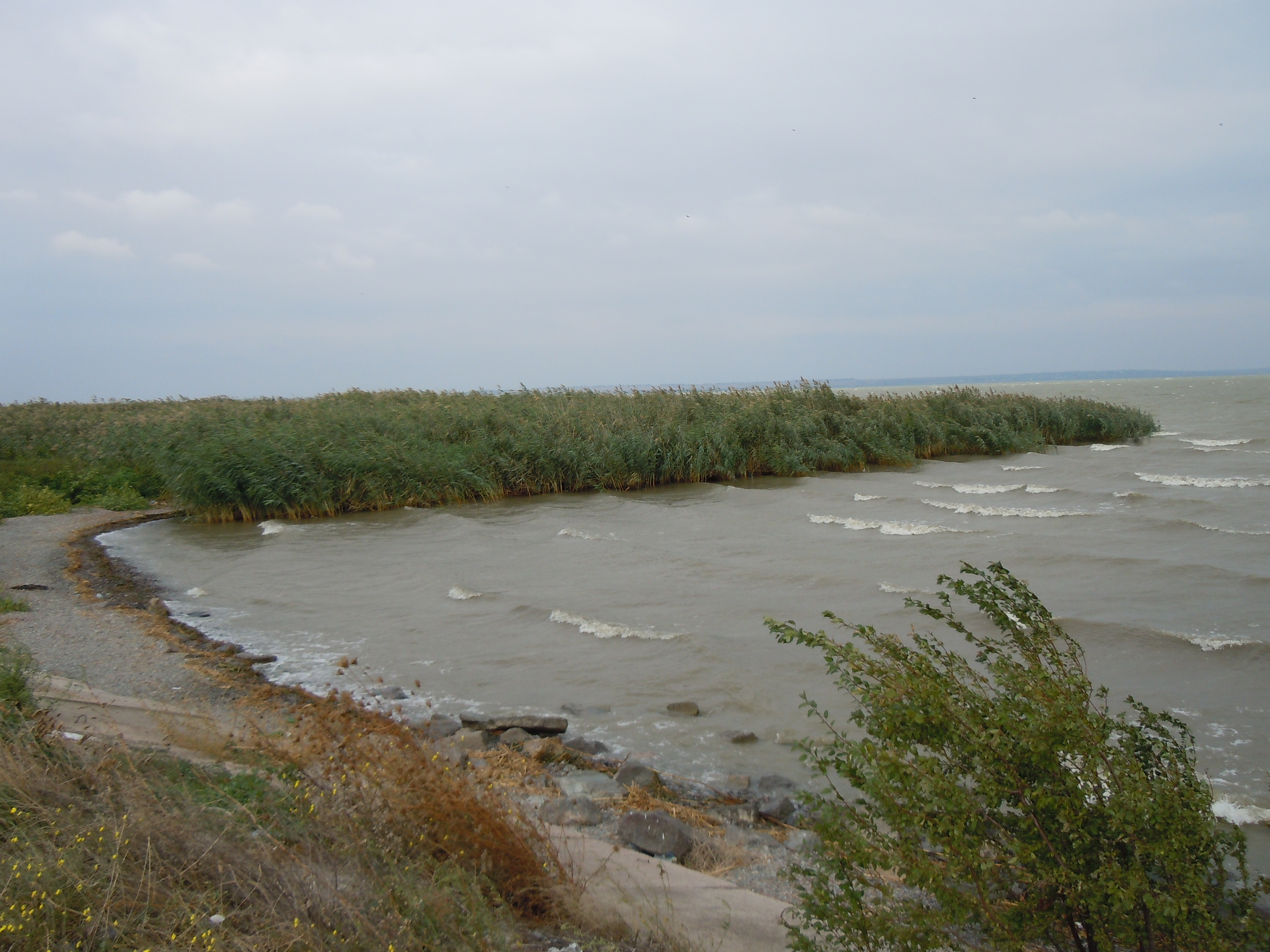
Lake Yalpuh, the largest lake in Ukraine

This is an incomplete list of lakes in Ukraine.

== List ==
| Rank | Lake or lagoon | Oblast | Area, km^{2} | Length (km) | Width (km) | Max. depth (m) |
|---|---|---|---|---|---|---|
| 1 | Yalpuh | Odesa | 149 | 40 | 5 | 6 |
| 2 | Cahul | Odesa | 93.5 | 25 | 8 | 7 |
| 3 | Kuhurlui | Odesa | 82 | 20 | 20 | 2 |
| 4 | Shahany | Odesa | 74 | 11.5 | 9.3 | 2 |
| 5 | Alibey | Odesa | 72 | 15 | 11 | 2.5 |
| 6 | Sasyk | Crimea | 71 | 14 | 10 | 1.2 |
| 7 | Katlabuh | Odesa | 67 | 21 | 11 | 4 |
| 8 | Kytai | Odesa | 60 | 24 | 3.5 | 5 |
| 9 | Donuzlav | Crimea | 48.2 | 30 | 8.5 | 27 |
| 10 | Aihulske | Crimea | 37 | 18 | 4.5 | 0.3 |
| 11 | Budatskyi | Odesa | 30 | 15 | 2.7 | 2 |
| 12 | Svitiaz | Volyn | 27.5 | 9.3 | 4.8 | 58.4 |
| 13 | Aqtas | Crimea | 26.8 | 8 | 3.5 | 0.1 |
| 14 | Uzunlarske | Crimea | 21.2 | 10 | 5.5 | 0.1 |
| 15 | Kirleutsk | Crimea | 20.8 | 13.8 | 3 | 0.6 |
| 16 | Tobechytske | Crimea | 18.7 | 10 | 5 | 0.5 |
| 17 | Pulemetske | Volyn | 16.3 | 6 | 3.6 | 19 |
| 18 | Turske | Crimea | 13 | 5.4 | 3.2 | 2.6 |
| 19 | Kiyatske | Crimea | 12.5 | 10 | 4.5 | 0.4 |
| 20 | Tuzla | Crimea | 12.2 | 5.5 | 2.5 | 0.8 |
