= Bulboaca =

Bulboaca may refer to:

- Bulboaca, Anenii Noi, a commune in Anenii Noi district, Moldova
- Bulboaca, Briceni, a commune in Briceni district, Moldova
- Bulboaca, a village in Deleni, Vaslui, a commune in Vaslui County, Romania
- Kotlovyna, a village in Ukraine known as Bulboaca in Romanian
- Bulboaca Military Training Base, a military base in eastern Moldova
