= Plavni =

Plavni (Russian: Плавни, Ukrainian: Плавні, meaning "reed bed") may refer to the following places:

- Plavni, Kaliningrad Oblast, village in Kaliningrad Oblast, Russia
- Plavni, Odesa Oblast, village in Reni Raion, Odesa Oblast, Ukraine
- Plavni, Poltava Oblast, village in Kozelshchyna Raion, Poltava Oblast, Ukraine
- Plavni, Zaporizhzhia Oblast, village in Vasylivka Raion, Zaporizhzhia Oblast, Ukraine

== See also ==
- Horishni Plavni, city in Poltava Oblast, Ukraine
