= Frecăței =

Frecăței may refer to several places in Romania:

- Frecăței, a commune in Brăila County
- Frecăței, a commune in Tulcea County
- Frecăței, a village in Movilița Commune, Vrancea County
- Lymanske, a village in Ukraine known in Romanian as Frecăței
