= Nahirne, Odesa Oblast =

Rural locality in Odesa Oblast, Ukraine

Nahirne Нагірне (Ukrainian) Caragacii-Vechi (Romanian)
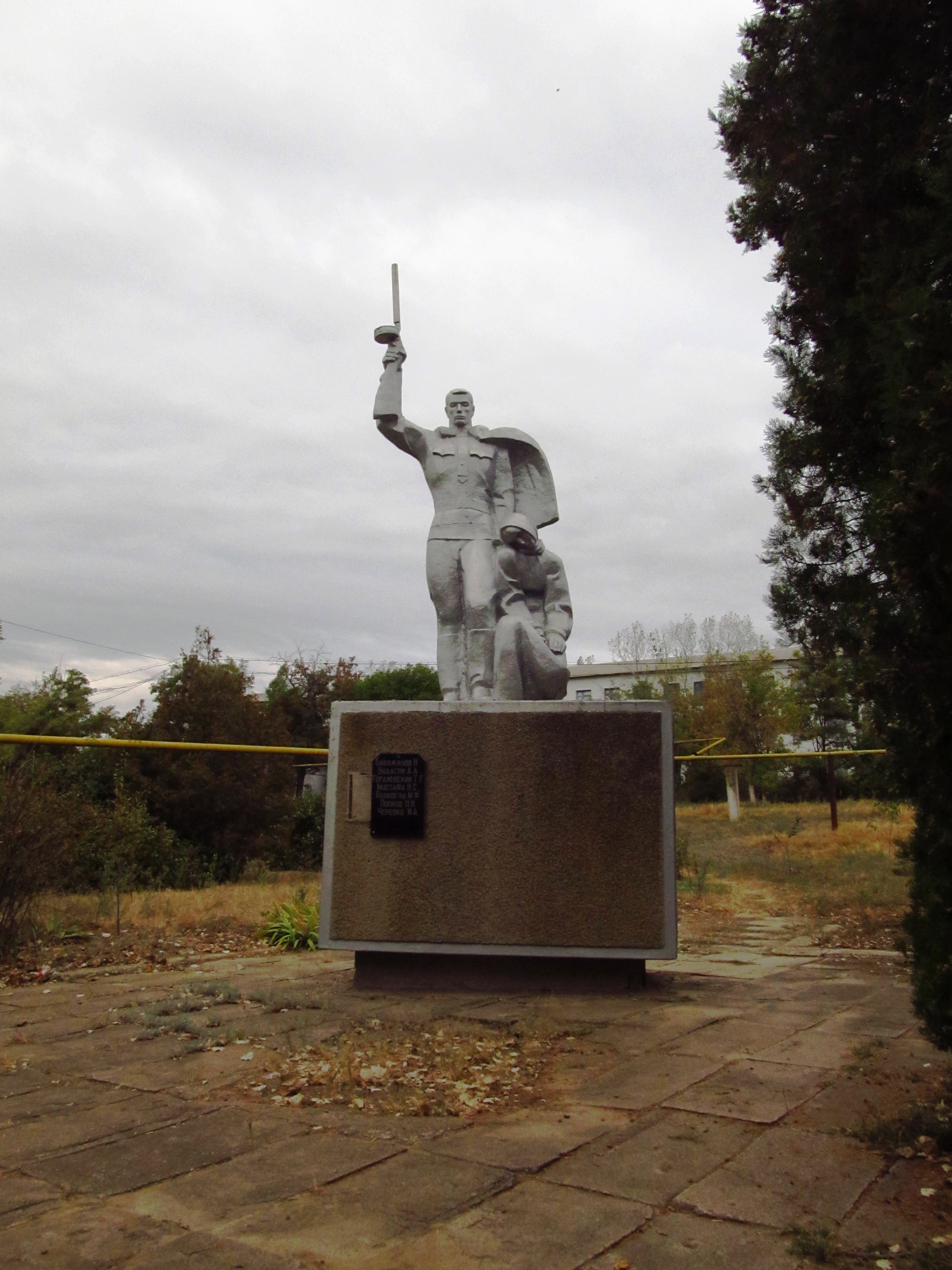

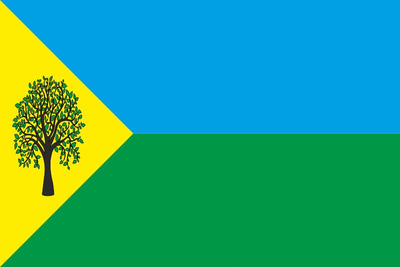
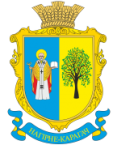
- Flag Coat of arms

- Location in Ukraine Nahirne (Odesa Oblast)
- Coordinates: 45°25′50″N 28°26′55″E
- Country: Ukraine
- Oblast: Odesa Oblast
- Raion: Izmail Raion
- Hromada: Reni urban hromada
- Time zone: UTC+2 (EET)
  - Summer (DST): UTC+3 (EEST)

Nahirne (until 1948: Karagach; Ukrainian: Нагірне; Romanian: Caragacii-Vechi) is a selo in Izmail Raion in the southern Ukrainian oblast of Odesa. It is situated on the north-eastern bank of Lake Kahul. It belongs to Reni urban hromada, one of the hromadas of Ukraine.

Until 18 July 2020, Nahirne belonged to Reni Raion. The raion was abolished in July 2020 as part of the administrative reform of Ukraine, which reduced the number of raions of Odesa Oblast to seven. The area of Reni Raion was merged into Izmail Raion.
