= Novosilske, Odesa Oblast =

Rural locality in Odesa Oblast, Ukraine

Novosilske Новосільське Satu Nou (Romanian)
- Village
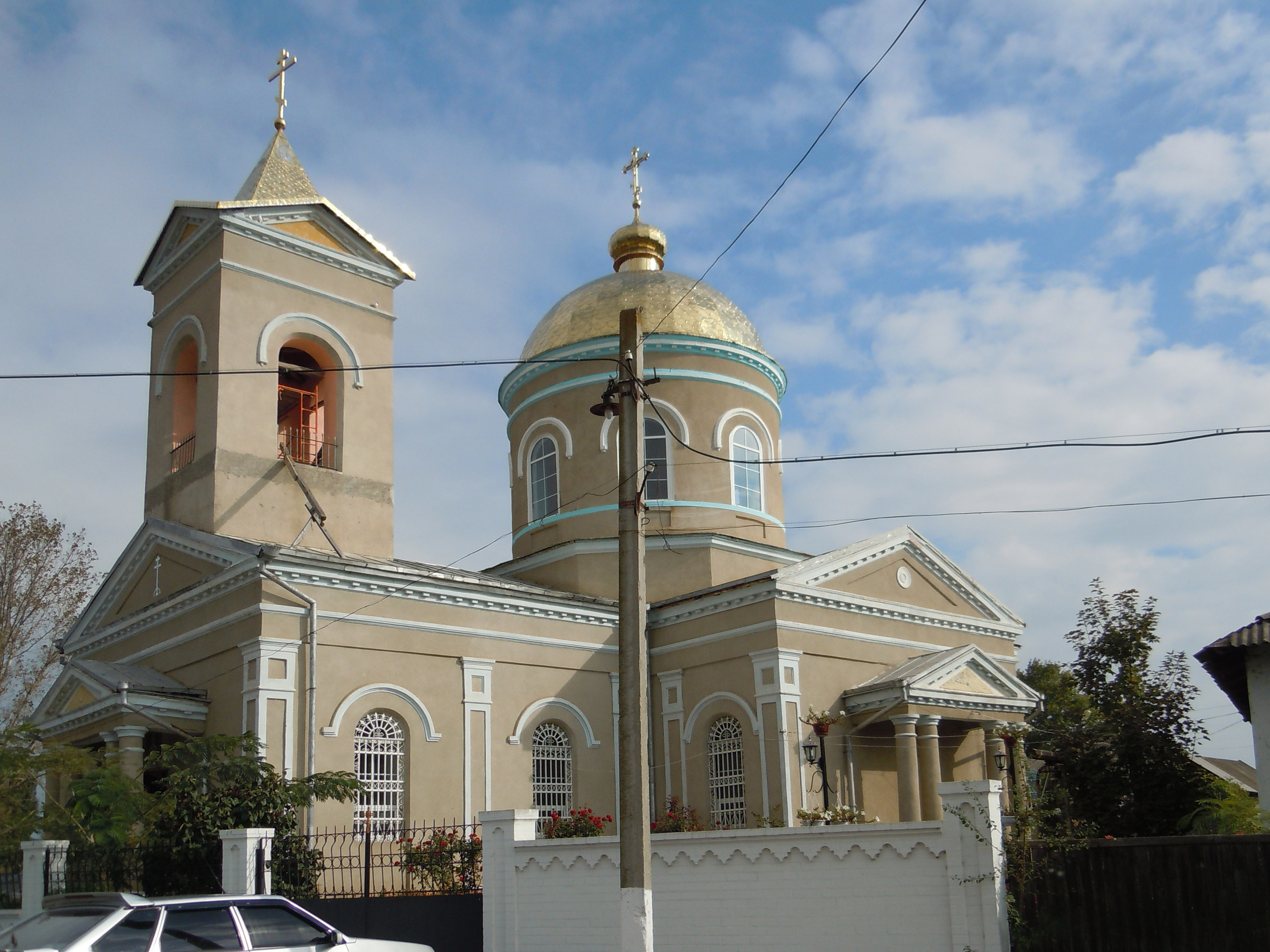
- St. Therapont of Belozersk church in Novosilske

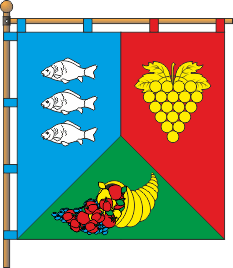
- Flag
- Interactive map of Novosilske
- Location in Ukraine Novosilske (Ukraine)
- Coordinates: 45°20′11″N 28°34′47″E
- Country: Ukraine
- Oblast: Odesa Oblast
- Raion: Izmail Raion
- Hromada: Reni urban hromada
- Time zone: UTC+2 (EET)
  - Summer (DST): UTC+3 (EEST)

Novosilske (Ukrainian: Новосільське; Romanian: Satu-Nou) is a village in Reni Raion in the southern Ukrainian oblast of Odesa. It belongs to Reni urban hromada, one of the hromadas of Ukraine. Novosilske is located at 45°19′N 28°34′E.

Until 18 July 2020, Novosilske belonged to Reni Raion. The raion was abolished in July 2020 as part of the administrative reform of Ukraine, which reduced the number of raions of Odesa Oblast to seven. The area of Reni Raion was merged into Izmail Raion. In 2001, 92.2% of the population spoke Romanian as its native language, while 3.22% spoke Russian and 2.1% spoke Ukrainian.
