= Plavni, Odesa Oblast =

Rural locality in Odesa Oblast, Ukraine

Plavni Плавні Barta
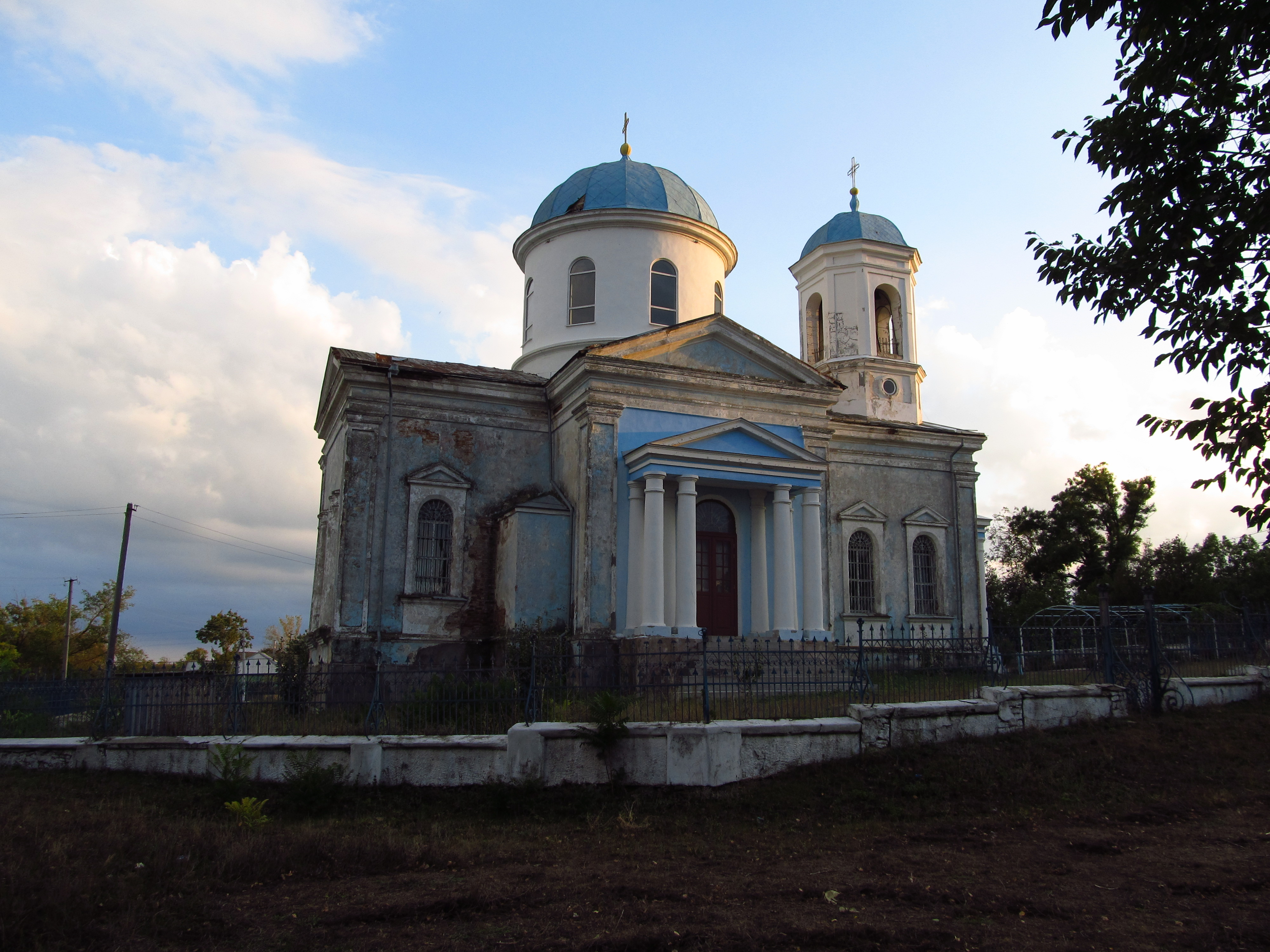
- The church in Plavni

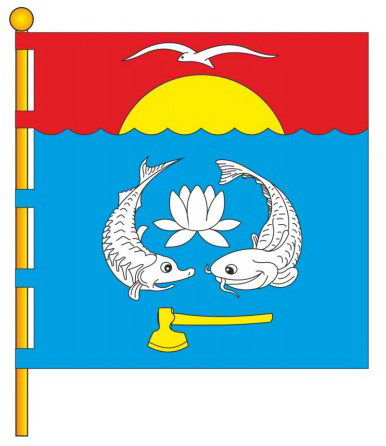
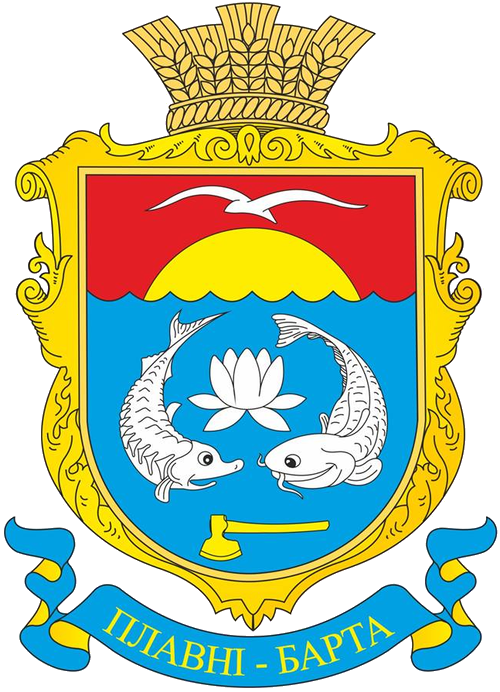
- Flag Coat of arms
- Interactive map of Plavni
- Location in Ukraine Plavni (Ukraine)
- Coordinates: 45°23′55″N 28°34′48″E
- Country: Ukraine
- Oblast: Odesa Oblast
- Raion: Izmail Raion
- Hromada: Reni urban hromada
- Time zone: UTC+2 (EET)
  - Summer (DST): UTC+3 (EEST)

Plavni (Ukrainian: Плавні; Romanian: Barta) is a village in Reni Raion in the southern Ukrainian oblast of Odesa. It belongs to Reni urban hromada, one of the hromadas of Ukraine. Plavni is situated on the western bank of Lake Yalpuh.

Until 18 July 2020, Plavni belonged to Reni Raion. The raion was abolished in July 2020 as part of the administrative reform of Ukraine, which reduced the number of raions of Odesa Oblast to seven. The area of Reni Raion was merged into Izmail Raion. In 2001, there were 2,039 inhabitants, of which 38 were Ukrainian speakers (1.86%), 1,900 Romanian speakers (93.18%), 23 Bulgarian speakers (1.13%), 47 Russian speakers (2.31%) and 18 Gagauz speakers (0.88%).
