= Valeriy Daskalytsya =

Ukrainian footballer (born 2002)

Personal information
- Full name: Valeriy Viktorovych Daskalytsya
- Date of birth: 17 January 2002 (age 24)
- Place of birth: Ukraine
- Height: 1.83 m (6 ft 0 in)
- Position: Goalkeeper

Team information
- Current team: Tytan Odesa

Youth career
- 2013–2014: DYuSSh Reni
- 2014–2016: Chornomorets Odesa
- 2016–2017: Shakhtar Donetsk
- 2017–2019: Chornomorets Odesa

Senior career*
Years	Team	Apps	(Gls)
2019–2023	Chornomorets Odesa	0	(0)
2019–2020	→ Chornomorets-2 Odesa	7	(0)
2020–2021	→ Real Pharma Odesa (loan)	5	(0)
2023–	Tytan Odesa		
- * Club domestic league appearances and goals as of 8 September 2021

Valeriy Viktorovych Daskalytsya (Ukrainian: Валерій Вікторович Даскалиця; born 17 January 2002) is a Ukrainian professional footballer who plays as a goalkeeper for an amateur side Tytan Odesa.
