= Dolynske, Izmail Raion, Odesa Oblast =

Rural locality in Odesa Oblast, Ukraine

Dolynske Долинське (Ukrainian) Anadol (Romanian)
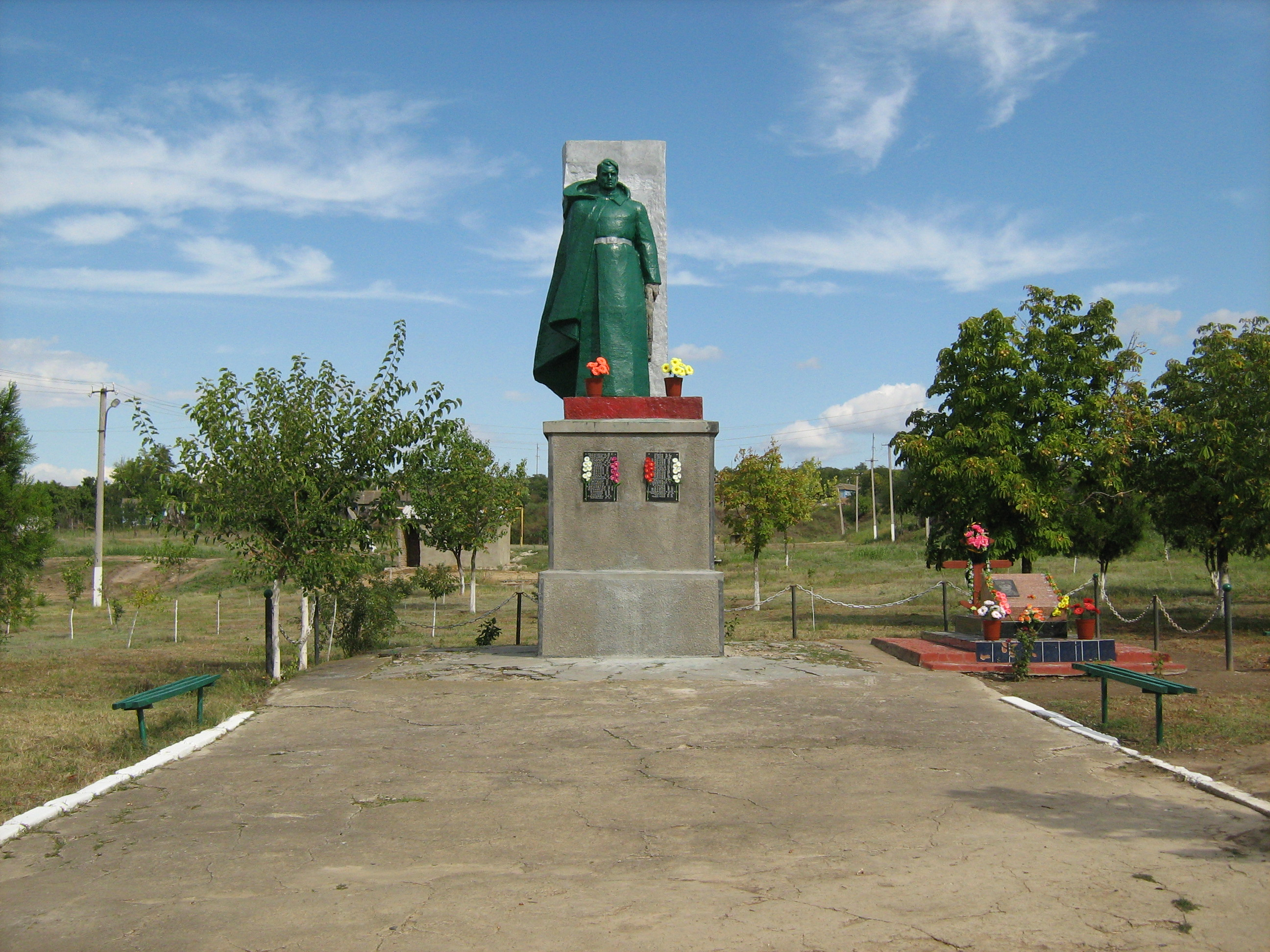

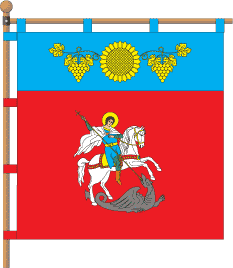
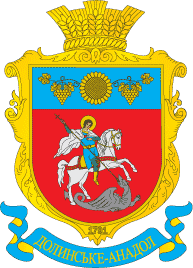
- Flag Coat of arms
- Interactive map of Dolynske
- Location in Ukraine Dolynske (Odesa Oblast)
- Country: Ukraine
- Oblast: Odesa Oblast
- Raion: Izmail Raion
- Hromada: Reni urban hromada
- Time zone: UTC+2 (EET)
  - Summer (DST): UTC+3 (EEST)

Dolynske (Ukrainian: Долинське; Romanian: Anadol) is a selo in Izmail Raion in the southern Ukrainian oblast of Odesa. It belongs to Reni urban hromada, one of the hromadas of Ukraine.

Dolynske is famous for the thick succession of Pleistocene water-lain facies containing Kharpov and Taman faunal complexes. The overlying loess-palaeosol sequence constitutes one of the most complete palaeoclimate archives in the Lower Danube Basin.

On May 19, 1919, villagers of Dolynske revolted against the Romanian Authorities.

Until 18 July 2020, Dolynske belonged to Reni Raion. The raion was abolished in July 2020 as part of the administrative reform of Ukraine, which reduced the number of raions of Odesa Oblast to seven. The area of Reni Raion was merged into Izmail Raion. In 2001, there were 2,705 inhabitants, of which 16 Ukrainian speakers (0.59%), 2,509 Romanian speakers (92.61%), 11 Bulgarian speakers (0.41%), 130 Russian speakers (4.81%) and 13 Gagauz speakers (0.48%).
