= Kyslivka, Kharkiv Oblast =

Village in Kharkiv Oblast, Ukraine

Kyslivka Кислівка
- Village
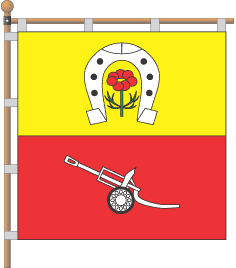
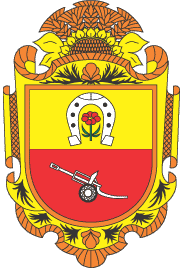
- Flag Seal
- Interactive map of Kyslivka
- Location of Kyslivka within Ukraine Kyslivka (Ukraine)
- Coordinates: 49.641667°N 37.898889°E
- Country: Ukraine
- Oblast: Kharkiv Oblast
- Raion: Kupiansk Raion
- Hromada: Petropavlivka rural hromada
- Founded: 1710

Area
  - Total: 1.59 km^{2} (0.61 sq mi)
- Elevation: 166 m (545 ft)

Population (2001 census)
  - Total: 956
  - Estimate (September 2024): 16
  - Density: 601/km^{2} (1,560/sq mi)
- Time zone: UTC+2 (EET)
  - Summer (DST): UTC+3 (EEST)
- Postal code: 63742
- Area code: +380 5742

Kyslivka (Ukrainian: Кислівка; Russian: Кисловка) is a village in Kupiansk Raion, Kharkiv Oblast, in eastern Ukraine. It is located 120.79 kilometres (75.06 mi) south-southeast (SSE) of the centre of Kharkiv city. It forms part of the Petropavlivka rural hromada, one of the hromadas of Ukraine.

== Demographics ==
As of the 2001 Ukrainian census, the settlement had 956 inhabitants. Their native languages were 92.02% Ukrainian, 7.67% Russian, 0.21% Belarusian and 0.10% Armenian.

== History ==
The settlement has witnessed intense fighting during the Russian invasion of Ukraine.

The settlement was occupied by the Russian Armed Forces on 5 May 2024.
