= Lymanske, Izmail Raion, Odesa Oblast =

Rural locality in Odesa Oblast, Ukraine

Lymanske Лиманське Frecăței (Romanian)
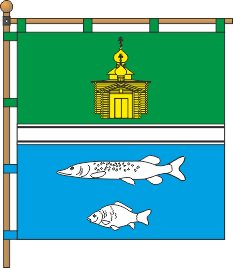
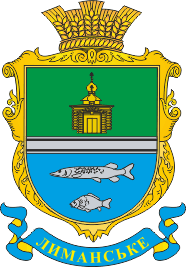
- Flag Coat of arms
- Interactive map of Lymanske
- Location in Ukraine Lymanske (Odesa Oblast)
- Country: Ukraine
- Oblast: Odesa Oblast
- Raion: Izmail Raion
- Hromada: Reni urban hromada
- Time zone: UTC+2 (EET)
  - Summer (DST): UTC+3 (EEST)

Lymanske (Ukrainian: Лиманське; Romanian: Frecăței) is a selo in Izmail Raion in the southern Ukrainian oblast of Odesa. Lymanske belongs to Reni urban hromada, one of the hromadas of Ukraine. It is situated on the north-western bank of Lake Kagul.

Until 18 July 2020, Lymanske belonged to Reni Raion. The raion was abolished in July 2020 as part of the administrative reform of Ukraine, which reduced the number of raions of Odesa Oblast to seven. The area of Reni Raion was merged into Izmail Raion. In 2001, there were 3,202 inhabitants, of which 26 Ukrainian speakers (0.79%), 3,802 Romanian speakers (93.34%), 30 Bulgarian speakers (0.91%), 127 Russian speakers (3.85%) and 30 Gagauz speakers (0.91%).
