= Reni urban hromada =

Coordinates: 45°24′52.2″N 28°25′36.9″E

Reni urban hromada Ренійська міська громада
- Hromada
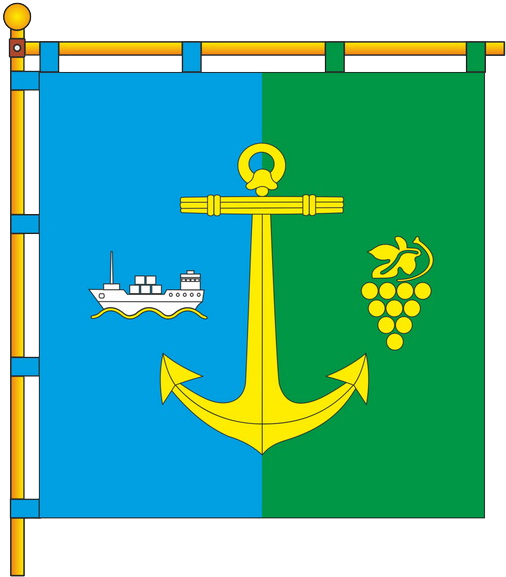
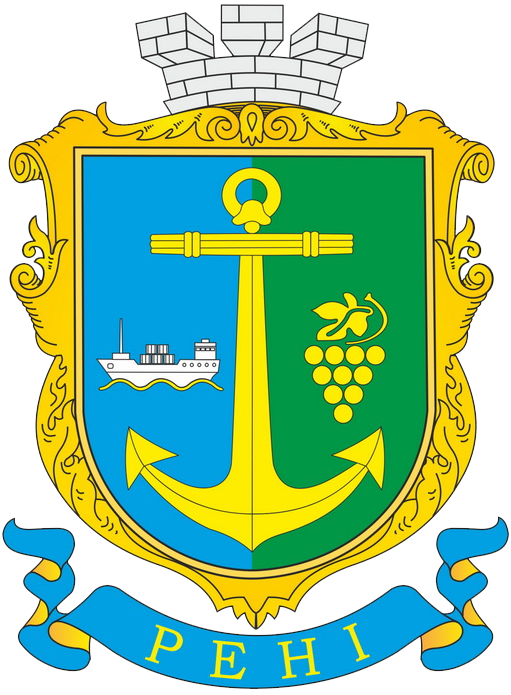
- Flag Coat of arms
- Interactive map of Reni urban hromada
- Country: Ukraine
- Oblast: Odesa Oblast
- Raion: Izmail Raion
- Admin. center: Reni

Area
  - Total: 840.1 km^{2} (324.4 sq mi)

Population (2022)
  - Total: 35,156
  - Density: 41.85/km^{2} (108.4/sq mi)
- CATOTTG code: UA51080070000040493
- Settlements: 8
- Cities: 1
- Villages: 7
- Website: reniyska-gromada.gov.ua/

Reni urban hromada (Ukrainian: Ренійська міська громада) is a hromada (municipality) in Ukraine, in Izmail Raion of Odesa Oblast. The administrative center is the city of Reni. Population: 35,156 (2022 estimate)

Until 18 July 2020, the hromada belonged to Reni Raion. The raion was abolished in July 2020 as part of the administrative reform of Ukraine, which reduced the number of raions of Odesa Oblast to seven. The area of Reni Raion was merged into Izmail Raion.

== Settlements ==
The hromada consists of 1 city (Reni) and 7 villages: Dolynske, Kotlovyna, Lymanske, Nahirne, Novosilske, Orlivka, and Plavni.

== Population ==
The hromada was predominantly Moldovan and the Ukrainian language was rare. According to the 2001 Ukrainian census the population of the Reni raion in its boundaries at that time was 49% Moldovan, 18% Ukrainian, 15% Russian, 8.5% Bulgarian and 8% Gagauz. Most of villages (five) are Romanian-speaking, as is most of the rural population, while there was one village populated by Gagauz and another one was populated by Bulgarians. The city of Reni was mostly (70.54%) Russophone, 13.37% Moldovan/Romanian-speaking (out of which 13.31% called the language Moldovan and 0.05% called it Romanian), 12.5% Ukrainian-speaking, 1.52% Gagauz-speaking and 1.33% Bulgarian-speaking. The Reni urban hromada, whose boundaries are identical with those of the former Reni Raion, had 40,680 inhabitants in 2001, out of which 16,639 spoke Romanian (40.9%), 15,411 spoke Russian (37.88%), 2,955 spoke Ukrainian (7.26%), 2,751 spoke Gagauz (6.76%), and 2,688 spoke Bulgarian (6.61%). The Reni urban hromada, identical in its territory to the former Reni Raion, in its boundaries until 2020, including the city of Reni, had 40,680 inhabitants in 2001, including 19,938 self-identified Moldovans (49.01%), 7,196 ethnic Ukrainians (17.69%), 6,136 ethnic Russians (15.08%), 3,439 Bulgarians (8.45%), 736 Gagauz (1.81%) and 36 self-identified Romanians (0.09%). The Reni urban hromada was one of only two hromadas in the Odesa Oblast in which the Romanian language predominated; the other one was the mostly Romanian-speaking Petropavlivka rural hromada, self-identified as the Moldovan language by most inhabitants in the 2001 Ukrainian census. The Moldovan linguistic identity population also represented a majority in four mostly Romanian-speaking hromadas of the Chernivtsi Oblast, including the Novoselytsia urban hromada the Boyany rural hromada, the Vanchykovetska rural community and the Mamalyhivska rural community. There was also a larger number of self-declared Moldovan-speakers than of self-declared Romanian-speakers in another one, the mostly Romanian-speaking Mahala rural community.
