= Kotlovyna =

Rural locality in Odesa Oblast, Ukraine

Kotlovyna Котловина
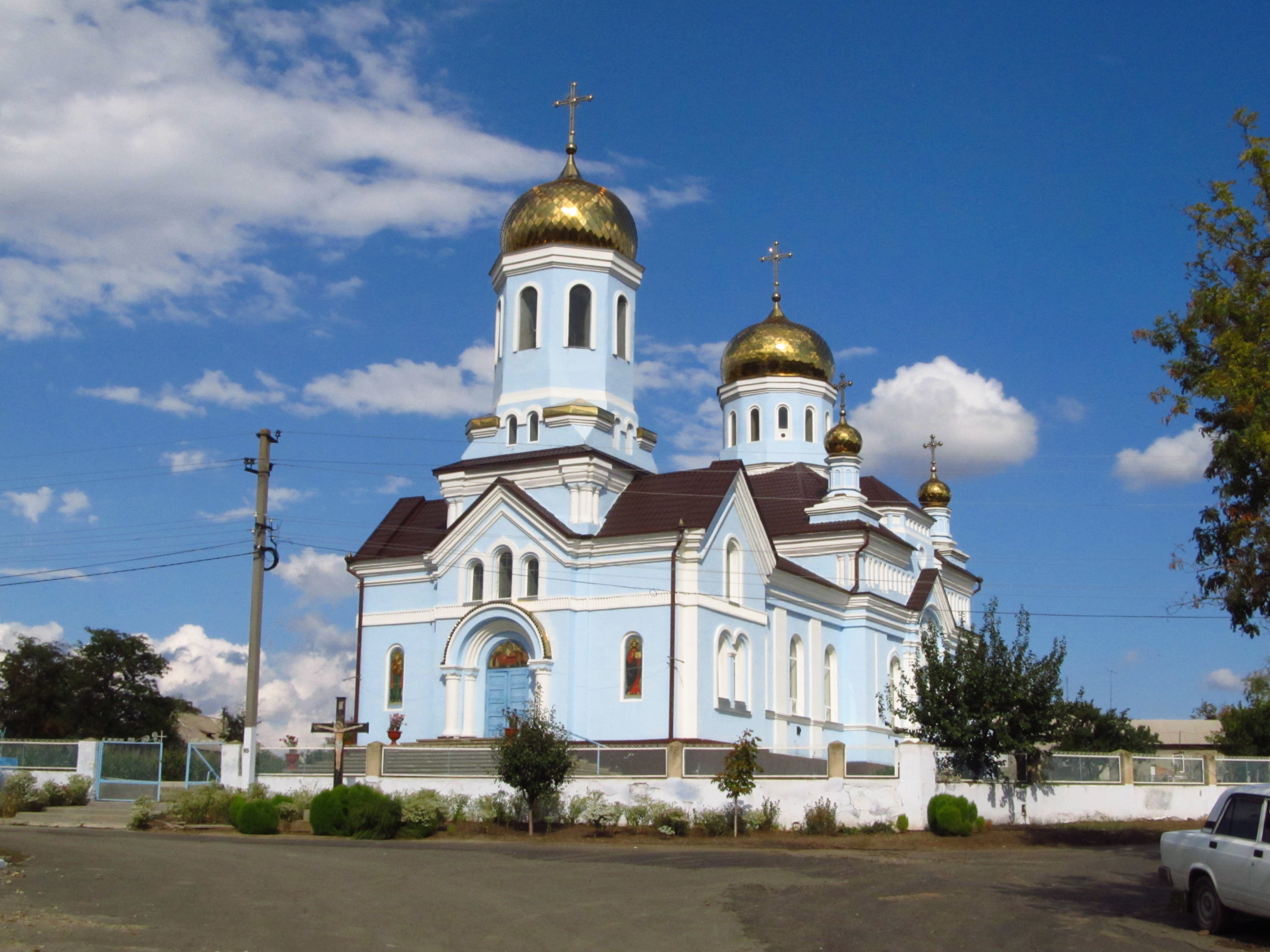
- The church in Kotlovyna

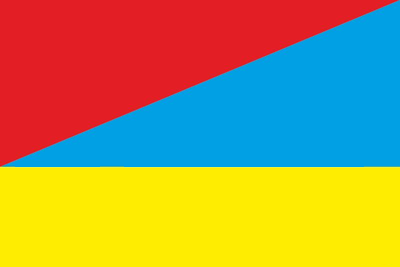
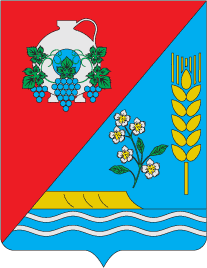
- Flag Coat of arms

- Location in Ukraine Kotlovyna (Odesa Oblast)
- Country: Ukraine
- Oblast: Odesa Oblast
- Raion: Izmail Raion
- Hromada: Reni urban hromada
- Time zone: UTC+2 (EET)
  - Summer (DST): UTC+3 (EEST)

Kotlovyna (until 1948: Bolboka; Ukrainian: Котловина; Gagauz: Bolboka; Romanian: Bulboaca, formerly Bolboca and Cotlovina) is a selo in Izmail Raion of the southern Ukrainian oblast of Odesa. It belongs to Reni urban hromada, one of the hromadas of Ukraine. Kotlovyna is situated on the western bank of Lake Yalpuh. According to the 2001 Ukrainian census, 86.72% of the village population spoke Gagauz.

In 2001 its population was recorded as 2,643.

Until 18 July 2020, Kotlovyna belonged to Reni Raion. The raion was abolished in July 2020 as part of the administrative reform of Ukraine, which reduced the number of raions of Odesa Oblast to seven. The area of Reni Raion was merged into Izmail Raion.
