= Lake Yalpuh =

Lake in Ukraine

Coordinates: 45°25′N 28°37′E

Yalpuh
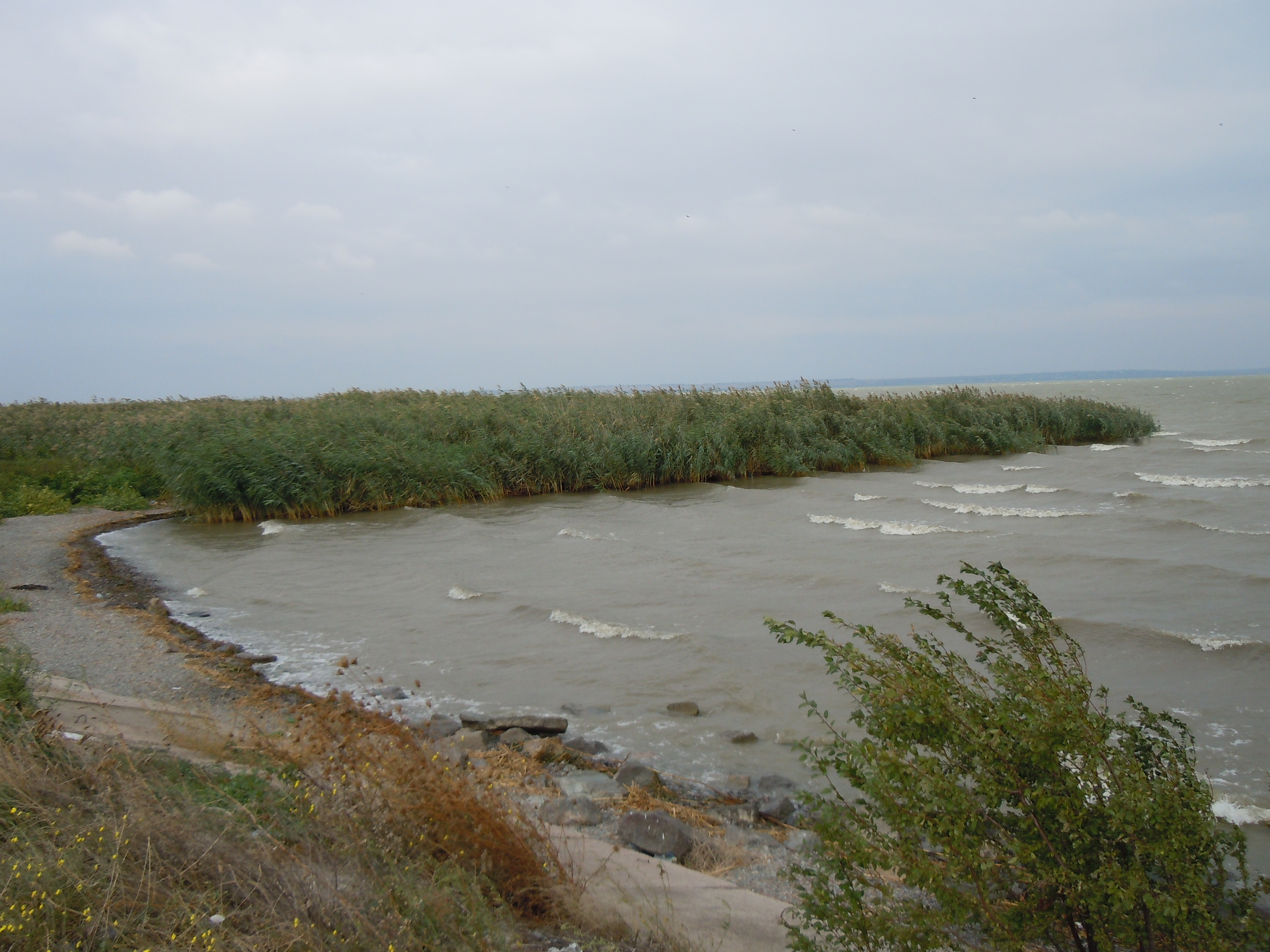

- Location within Odesa Oblast
- Interactive map of Yalpuh
- Location: Odesa Oblast
- Primary outflows: Lake Kuhurlui
- Basin countries: Ukraine
- Surface area: 149 km^{2} (58 sq mi)
- Average depth: 2 m (6.6 ft)
- Max. depth: 5.5 m (18 ft)
- Settlements: Bolhrad, Vynohradivka, Kotlovyna, Ozerne

Lake Yalpuh (Ukrainian: Озеро Ялпуг) is a freshwater lake located in the southern Ukrainian oblast of Odesa. It is the largest natural lake in Ukraine.

Lake Yalpug is located in a temperate climate zone with warm summers and cold winters. The water level in the lake fluctuates seasonally: it is at a minimum during winter and autumn, and at a maximum in spring and in summer.

The lake is connected to the River Danube through Lake Kuhurlui and other rivers and straits, Lake Yalpug is home to up to 40 species of fish, many of which are of commercial importance. It is used for water supply to settlements, fish farming, recreation, and in the summer months - for irrigation purposes. The largest town on Yalpuh's shores is Bolhrad.

== Name ==
Lake Yalpuh's name comes from the river of the same name, which was probably named by the Polovtsians. In the Polovtsian language, the adjective jalpy meant "wide, sprawling", "ahead, shallow".

== Geography ==
The lake is located on the Black Sea Lowland, on the left bank of the Danube. Yalpuh is northern shores are in Bolhrad Raion. It borders Izmail Raion to its southwest and southeast. The largest town on Yalpuh's shores is Bolhrad at its northernmost point. Larger villages include Vynohradivka to the north, Kotlovyna to the west and Ozerne on its southeastern shore.

It covers an area of 149 km², has an average depth of about two metres, a maximum depth of 5.5 metres and, at its southernmost point, adjoins Lake Kugurluy. Two rivers, Yalpug and Karasulak, flow into the lake.

By its origin, Lake Yalpug belongs to the group of river lakes. The shores of the lake were formed as a result of long-term historical and geological development and the rise in the level of the World Ocean, which created conditions for the rise of water in the Danube. The lake basin was formed as a result of the flooding of the floodplain and part of the banks of the Yalpug River, a left tributary of the Danube.

The lake basin has an elongated shape. The eastern and western shores are elevated, dissected by beams, the southern ones are sandy. The extreme northern part of the coast, at the mouth of the Yalpug River, is swampy and overgrown with reeds. The shores of the lake are prone to erosion processes due to changes in the erosion base. The state of the lake shores is also changing due to anthropogenic impact, namely the construction of a dam, quarry development, the construction of terraces and the afforestation of slopes.

=== Climate ===
Yalpug is located in a temperate climate zone with warm summers and cold winters. Precipitation is approximately 400 mm per year, mainly in the summer. The water temperature in summer is +24...+25 °C; in winter the lake freezes, the ice regime is unstable.

Lake Yalpug experiences several freezes and thaws during the winter season. The water level in the lake fluctuates seasonally: minimum in winter and autumn, maximum in spring and summer. The lake is significantly replenished by Danube waters during the spring flood. The amplitude of the water level fluctuation in the lake is up to 360 cm.

Through Lake Kugurluy, rivers and straits, the lake are connected to the Danube. During heavy floods, Danube water flows through these straits into Kugurluy and Yalpug. The Yalpug River flows into the lake at an altitude of 2.0 m above sea level.

=== Flora and fauna ===
The shores of the lake are overgrown with reeds and cattails, and algae and other aquatic vegetation are widespread in the lake. In the northern part of the reservoir, reeds predominate, while in the south, sedge, lake schenoplectus, and others grow. Aquatic vegetation occupies 24% of the total area of the lake. The lake is poor in underwater vegetation.

Yalpug in its natural state is a reservoir rich in ichthyofauna, with up to 40 species of fish living in it, of which carp, rudd, perch, and pike are of greatest commercial importance. The lake has valuable spawning grounds for zander, bream, pike perch, and other fish, and there are numerous crayfish.

== Human use ==
The continuation of Lake Yalpug in the south is Lake Kuhurlui. Between these lakes in the 70s of the 20th century, a dam, which were built to protect the areas adjacent to the river from flooding and regulate the water level in the lakes (in the interests of agriculture). along which The Izmail-Reni road was built along the dam. After the construction of the dam, the water exchange between Lake Yalpug and Kugurluy decreased by almost a third.

The territory around the lake is covered with vineyards, orchards and agricultural fields. Agricultural enterprises of the Bolgrad and Izmail districts of the Odessa region use the lake water for their needs. In the summer season, the lake level decreases due to irrigated fields. In 2021-2022, due to drought and high air temperatures, the water level on the lake was very low — 1.4 meters.

Bolgrad district of Odessa region uses water from Lake Yalpug for domestic and industrial needs. The lake is used for fish farming, recreation, and in the summer months water is taken for irrigation purposes.

== Ecology ==
The content of detected substances in the lake waters in 2024 did not exceed the established environmental quality standards, only the content of pesticides and polyaromatic hydrocarbons exceeded the average annual permissible concentrations.

== Conservation ==
On the shores of Lake Yalpug in the city of Bolgrad, there is a park-monument of local significance.

The Vynogradivka Landscape Reserve of Local Significance is located in the Bolgrad district of the Odessa region, near the villages of Vynogradivka and Vladycheny, which protects areas of steppe with plants from the Red Book of Ukraine.

In the summer of 2020, the Odesa regional administration announced the creation of a project for a landscape national park on lakes Kugurluy and Yalpug.

== Gallery ==
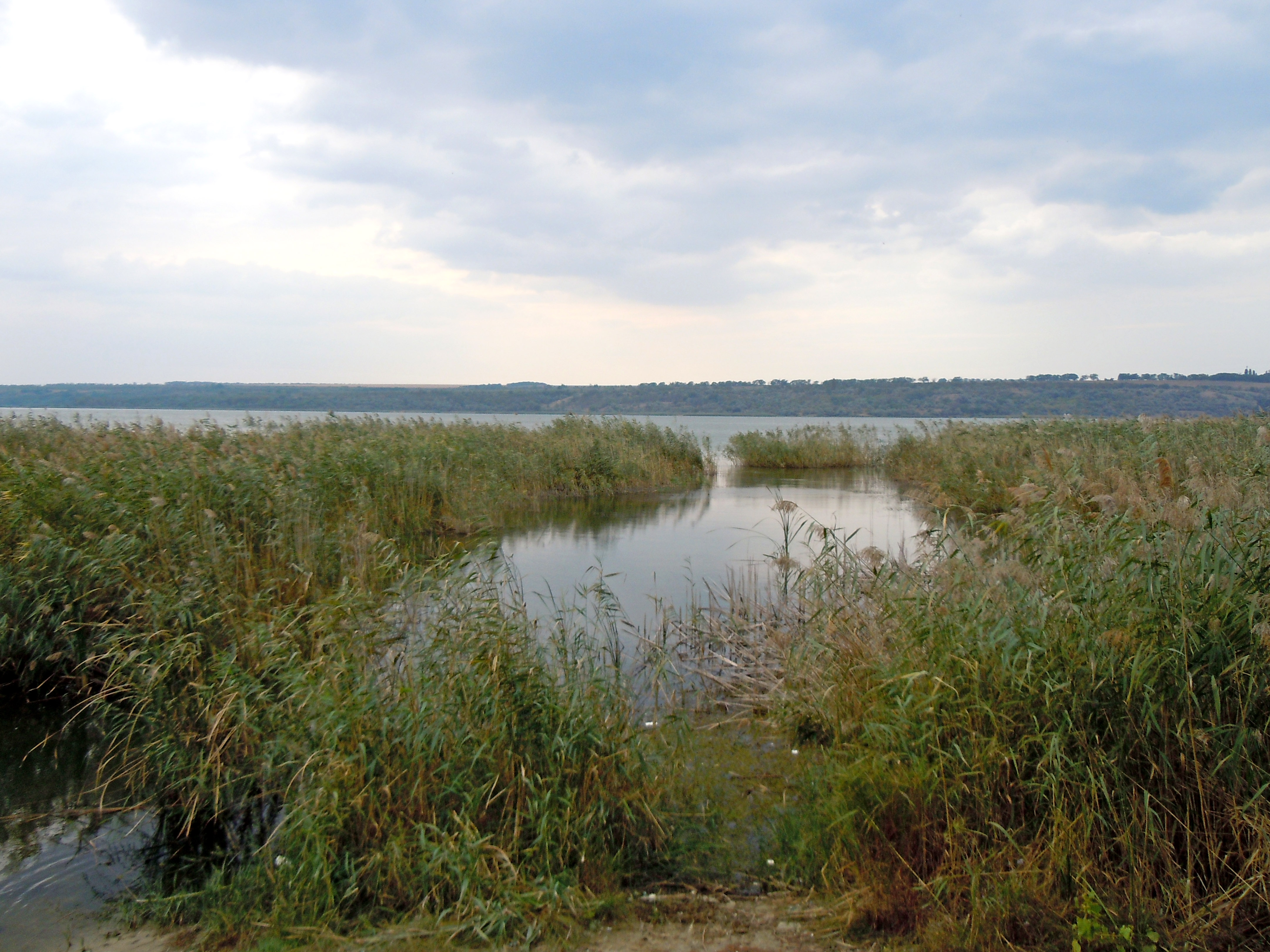
Bolgrad, City Park, by Lake Yalpug

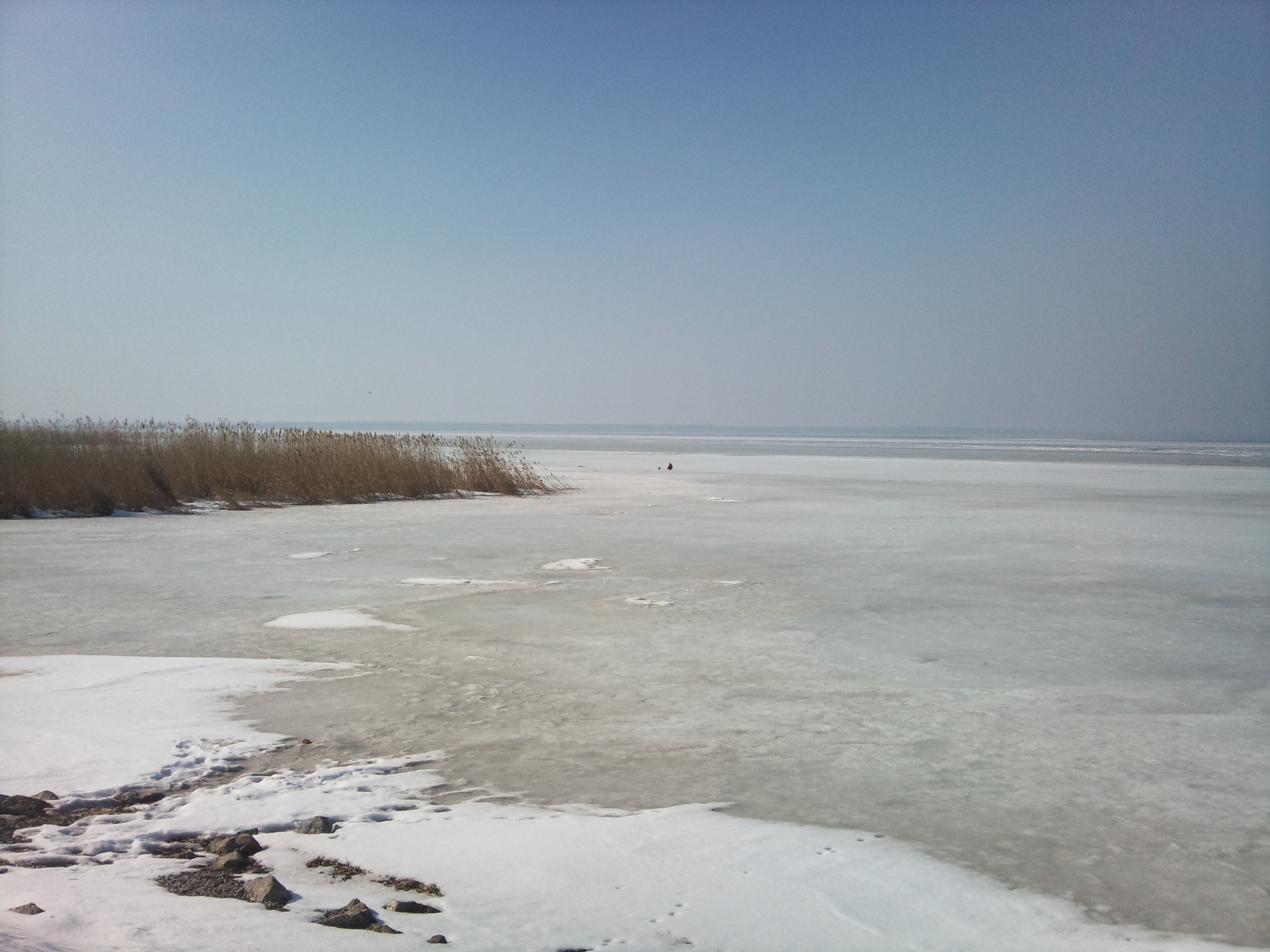
Yalpug in winter

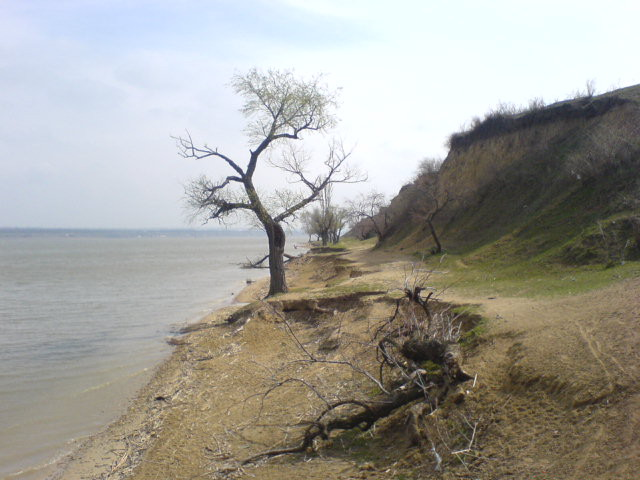
Yalpug lake shore

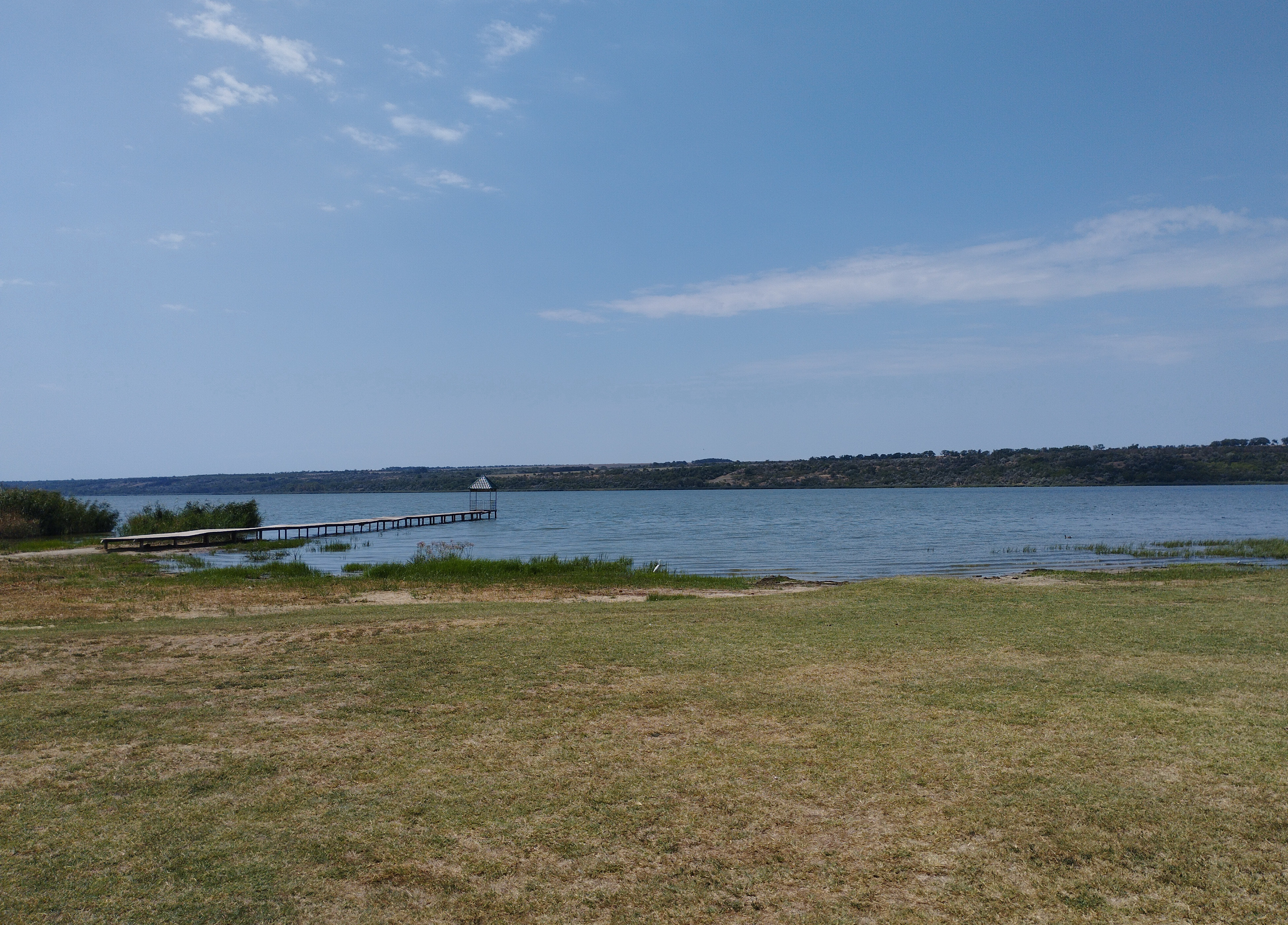
Lake Yalpuh
