= Bulboaca, Briceni =

Bulboaca
- Village
- Location within Moldova
- Coordinates: 48°22′21″N 27°12′4″E
- Country: Moldova

Government
  - Mayor: Valeriu Parașciuc (PLDM)
- Elevation: 238 m (781 ft)

Population (2014 census)
  - Total: 793
- Time zone: UTC+2 (EET)
  - Summer (DST): UTC+3 (EEST)
- Postal code: MD-4716

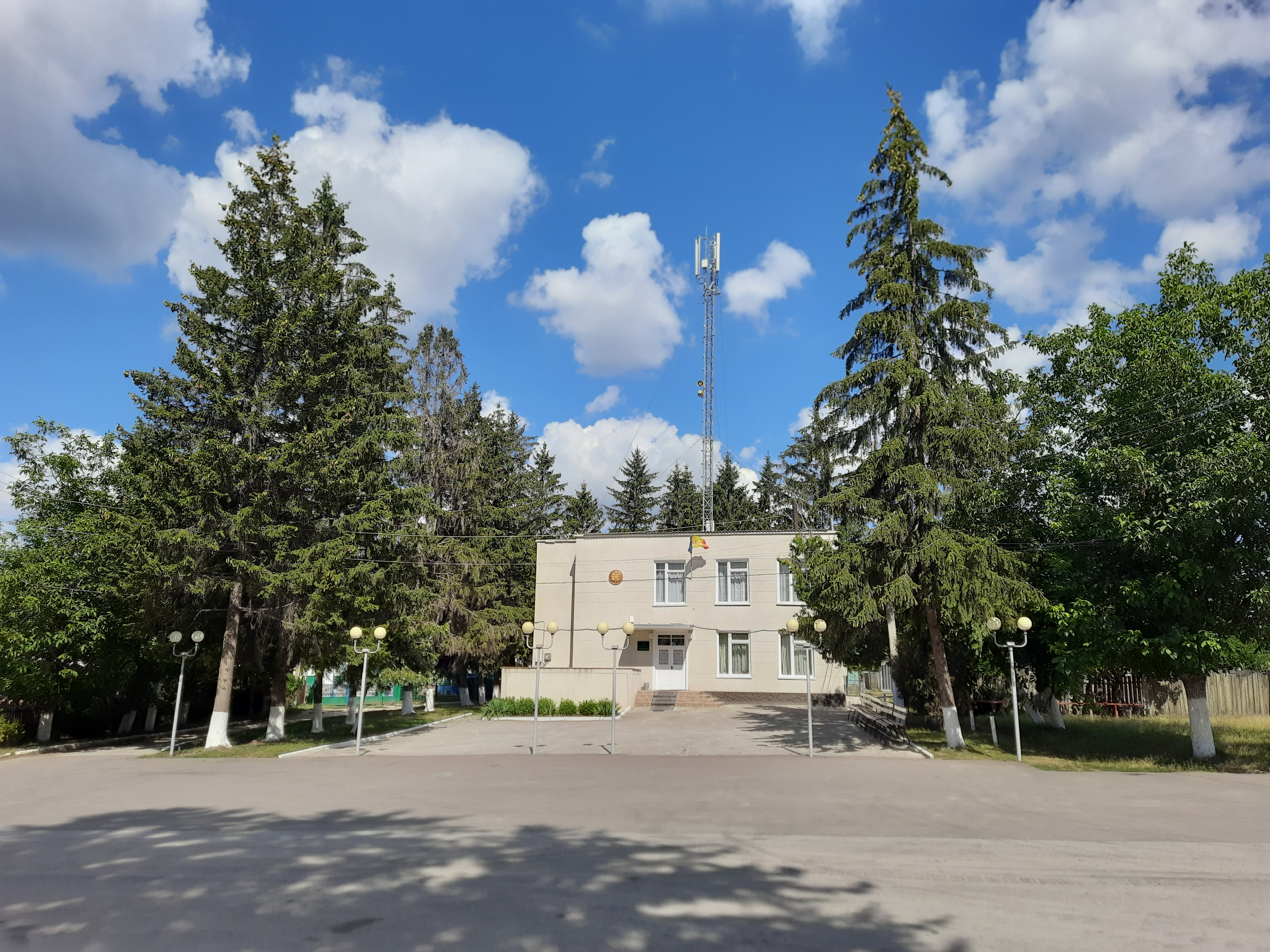
Bulboaca village hall, Briceni district, Republic of Moldova

Bulboaca is a village in Briceni District, Moldova.
