= Lake Kuhurlui =

Lake in Ukraine

Kuhurlui
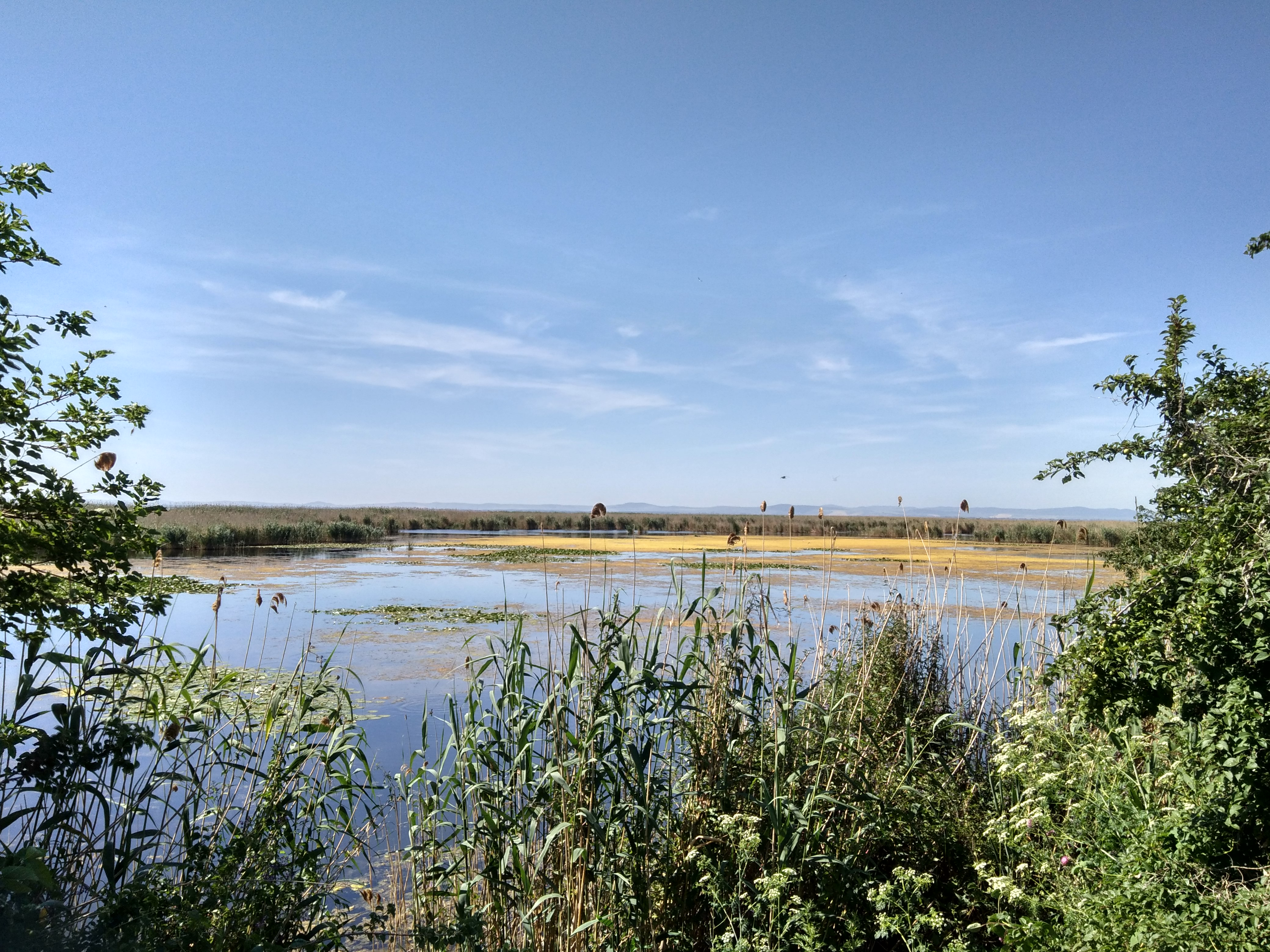

- Location within Odesa Oblast Location within Ukraine
- Interactive map of Kuhurlui
- Location: Odesa Oblast
- Coordinates: 45°18′N 28°40′E
- Basin countries: Ukraine
- Surface area: 82 km^{2} (32 sq mi)
- Average depth: 0.8 m (2.6 ft)
- Max. depth: 5 m (16 ft)

Ramsar Wetland
- Official name: Kugurlui Lake
- Designated: 23 November 1995
- Reference no.: 760

Kuhurlui (Ukrainian: озеро Кугурлуй) is a lake in the south-western Ukraine, in the south of Bessarabia. It is in complex of the Danube river delta.

== See also ==
- Lake Yalpuh
