= Reni, Ukraine =

City in Odesa Oblast, Ukraine

Reni Рені
- City
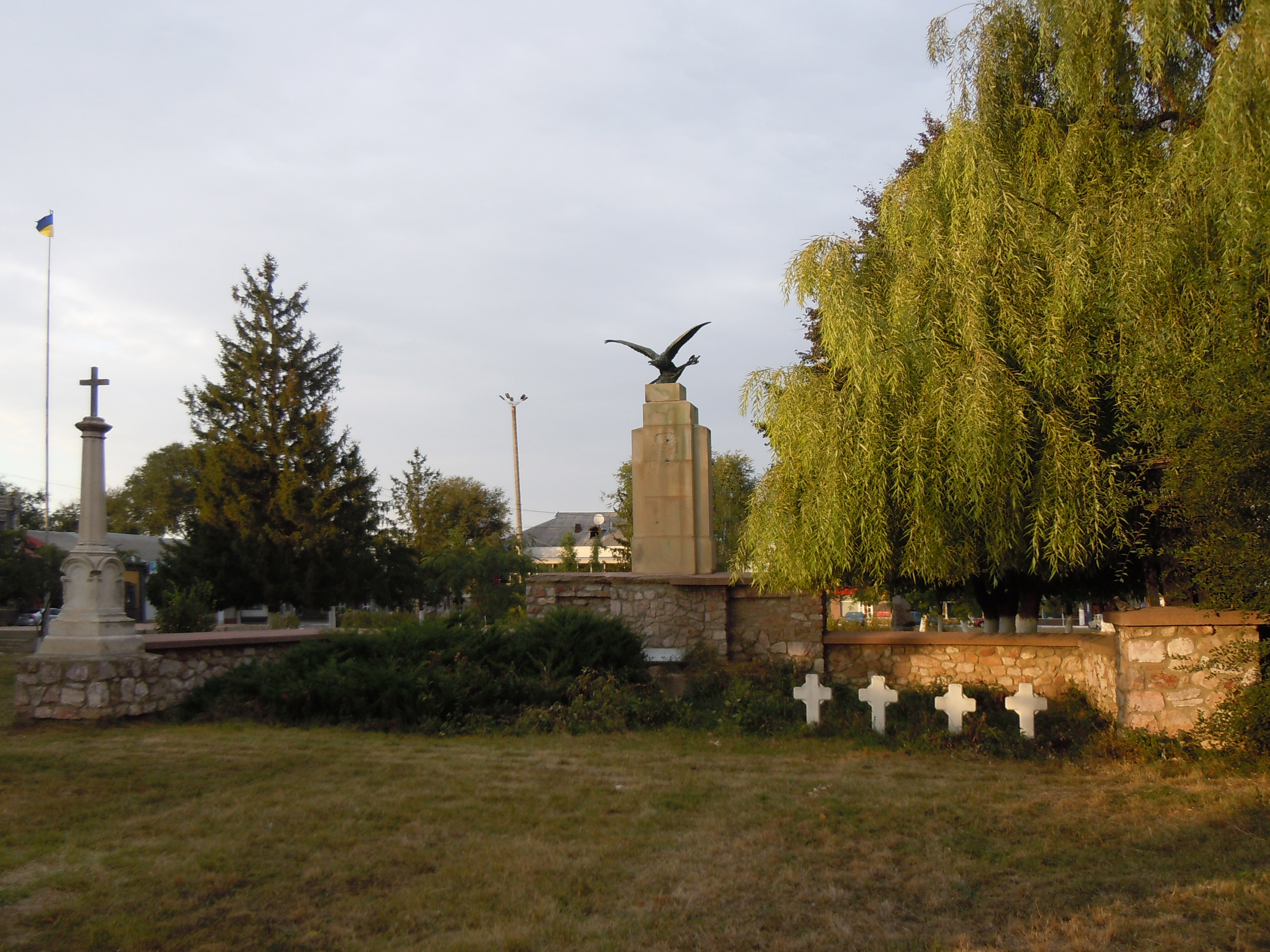

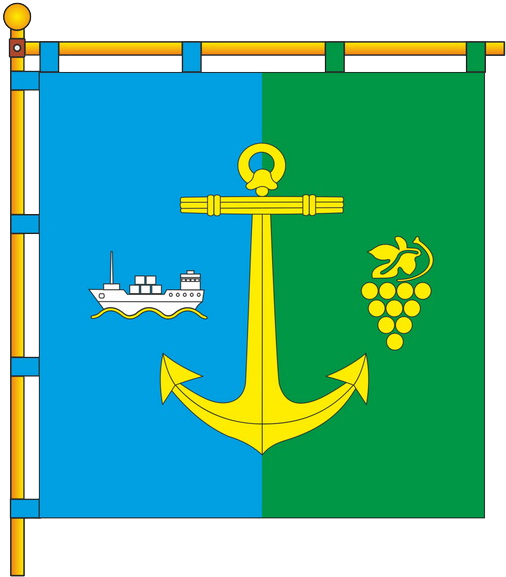
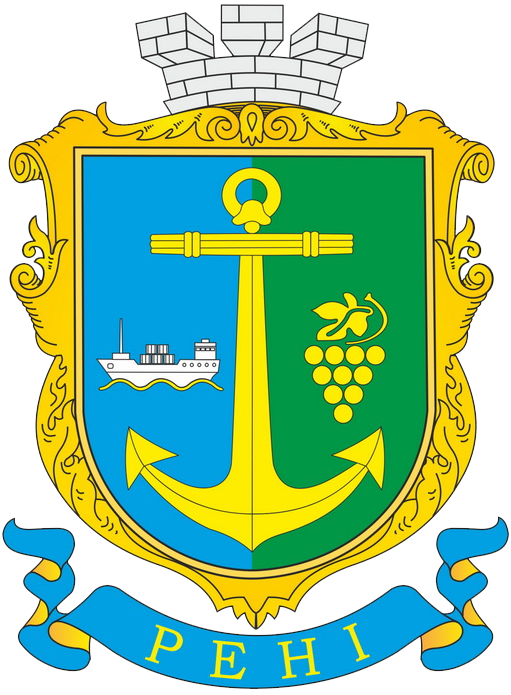
- Flag Coat of arms
- Interactive map of Reni
- Location of Reni in Odesa Oblast Reni (Ukraine)
- Coordinates: 45°27′27″N 28°16′16″E
- Country: Ukraine
- Oblast: Odesa Oblast
- Raion: Izmail Raion
- Hromada: Reni urban hromada

Government
  - City Head/Mayor: Ihor Plekhov

Area
  - Total: 393 km^{2} (152 sq mi)

Population (2022)
  - Total: 17,736
  - Density: 45.1/km^{2} (117/sq mi)
- Time zone: UTC+2 (EET)
  - Summer (DST): UTC+3 (EEST)
- Postal code: 68800—809
- Area code: +380 4840
- KATOTTH: UA51080070010065897
- Website: renimvk.od.ua

Reni (Ukrainian: Рені, pronounced [reˈn⁽ʲ⁾i]; Romanian: Reni) is a small city in Izmail Raion, Odesa Oblast, southern Ukraine. It hosts the administration of Reni urban hromada, one of the hromadas of Ukraine. Reni is located in the Bessarabian historic district of Budjak and on the left bank of the Danube. The settlement was founded around 1548, acquiring city status in 1821. Population: 17,736 (2022 estimate).

There are six schools, one filial branch of the Oles Honchar Dnipro National University, and three Ukrainian Orthodox church buildings. Reni is also home to the Light of the World Church.

== History ==
Until July 18, 2020, Reni was the administrative center of Reni Raion. The raion was abolished in July 2020 as part of the administrative reform of Ukraine, which reduced the number of raions of Odesa Oblast to seven. The area of Reni Raion was merged into Izmail Raion.

=== 2023 Reni port attack ===
On the night between 23 and 24 July 2023, during the Russian invasion of Ukraine and the nationwide missile attacks, the port of Reni was attacked by Russia, being struck by multiple suicide drones. The port of Reni is an internal port of Ukraine, lying on the Danube river which forms Ukraine's border with Romania, the port itself lying half a kilometer away from the Romanian bank of the Danube.

Multiple Romanian sailors in the waters around the port caught the bombings on camera, and a Romanian ship was damaged during the assault. Similar attacks targeted the nearby ports of Izmail and Kiliia, all lying on the Danube. The government of the neighbouring country allowed numerous ships to immediately cross the border.

== Demographics ==
Historical population
Year	Pop.	±%
1897	6,941	—
2001	20,761	+199.1%
2022	17,736	−14.6%

The city of Reni had 20,761 inhabitants in 2001, including 6,694 ethnic Ukrainians (32.24%), 6,126 self-identified Moldovans (Romanians; 29.51%), 5,589 ethnic Russians (26.92%), 1,012 Bulgarians (4.87%), 736 Gagauz (1.81%) and 22 self-identified Romanians (0.11%). There was a decrease in the population of the city of Reni from 20,761 inhabitants in 2001, to 17,736 in 2022, and a reduction of the raion's population from 40,680 in 2001 to 35,954. The city of Reni was mostly (70.54%) Russophone, 13.37% Romanian-speaking (out of which 13.31% called the language Moldovan and 0.05% called it Romanian), 12.5% Ukrainian-speaking, 1.52% Gagauz-speaking and 1.33% Bulgarian-speaking. In 2001, Reni Raion, in its boundaries at that time, including the city of Reni, had 40,680 inhabitants in 2001, including 19,938 Moldovans (49.01%), 7,196 ethnic Ukrainians (17.69%), 6,136 Russians (15.08%), 3,439 Bulgarians (8.45%), 736 Gagauz (1.81%) and 36 Romanians (0.09%). The current Reni urban hromada, whose boundaries are identical with those of the former Reni Raion, had 40,680 inhabitants in 2001, out of which 16,639 spoke Romanian (40.9%, out of which 40,8%% called it Moldovan and 0.07% called it Romanian), 15,411 spoke Russian (37.88%), 2,955 spoke Ukrainian (7.26%), 2,751 spoke Gagauz (6.76%), and 2,688 spoke Bulgarian (6.61%).

In 1897, the make-up by mother tongue was 37.6% Moldavian, 19.8% Ukrainian, 17.1% Russian, 10.5% Yiddish, 9.4% Bulgarian, 2.0% Greek, 1.5% Turkish, 1.1% Polish.

== Gallery ==
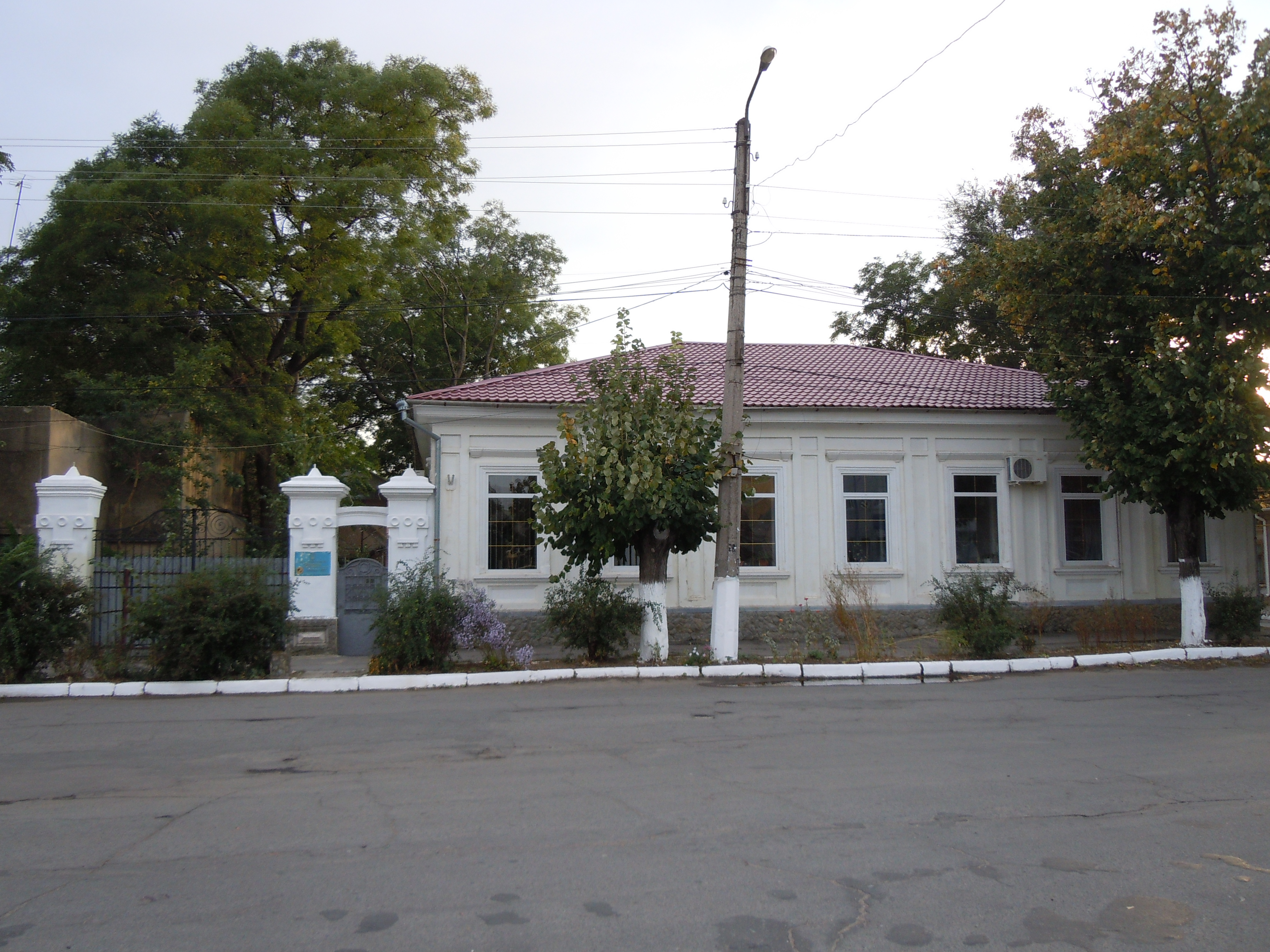
Freedom Square

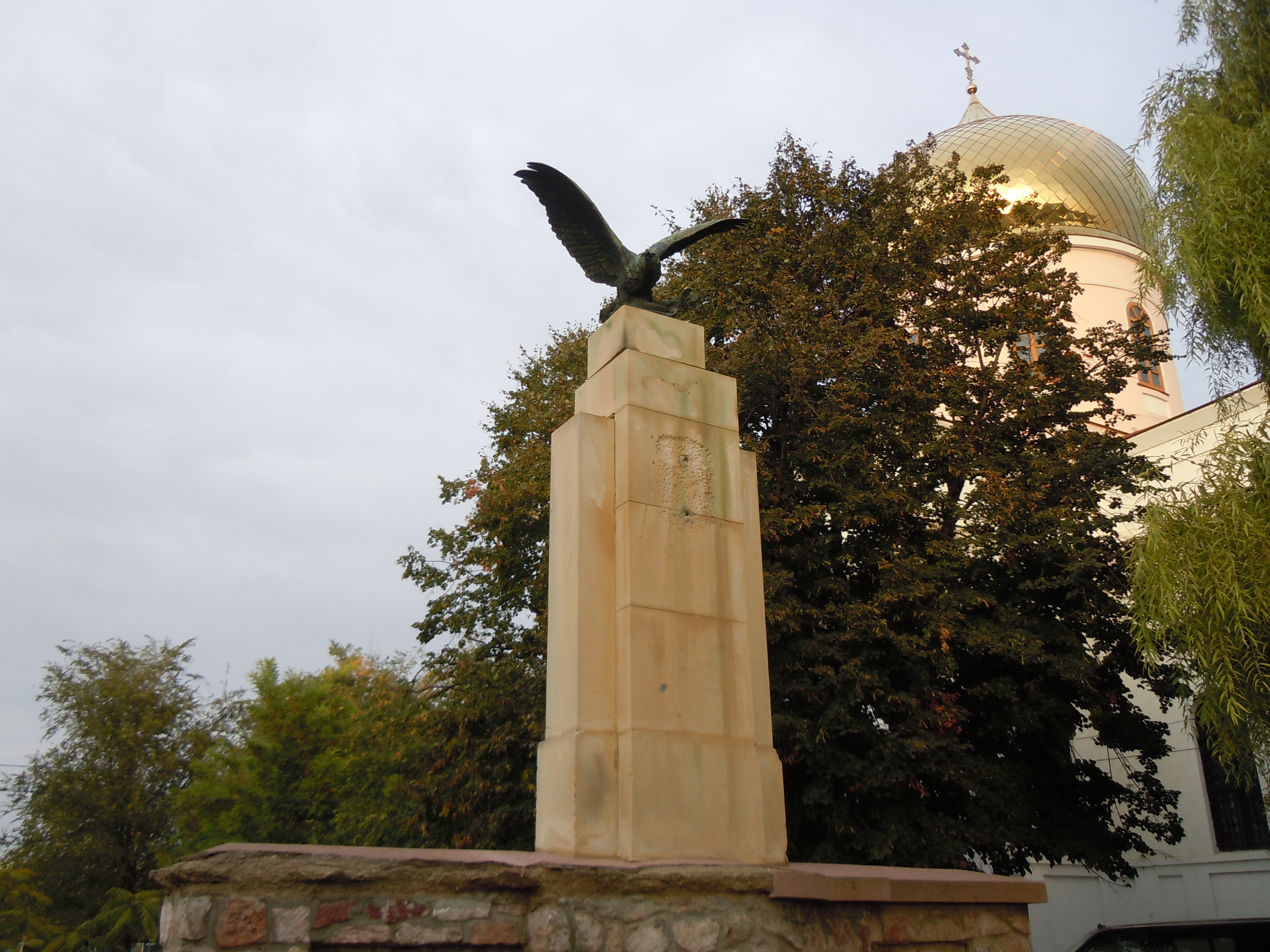
Grave of the soldiers

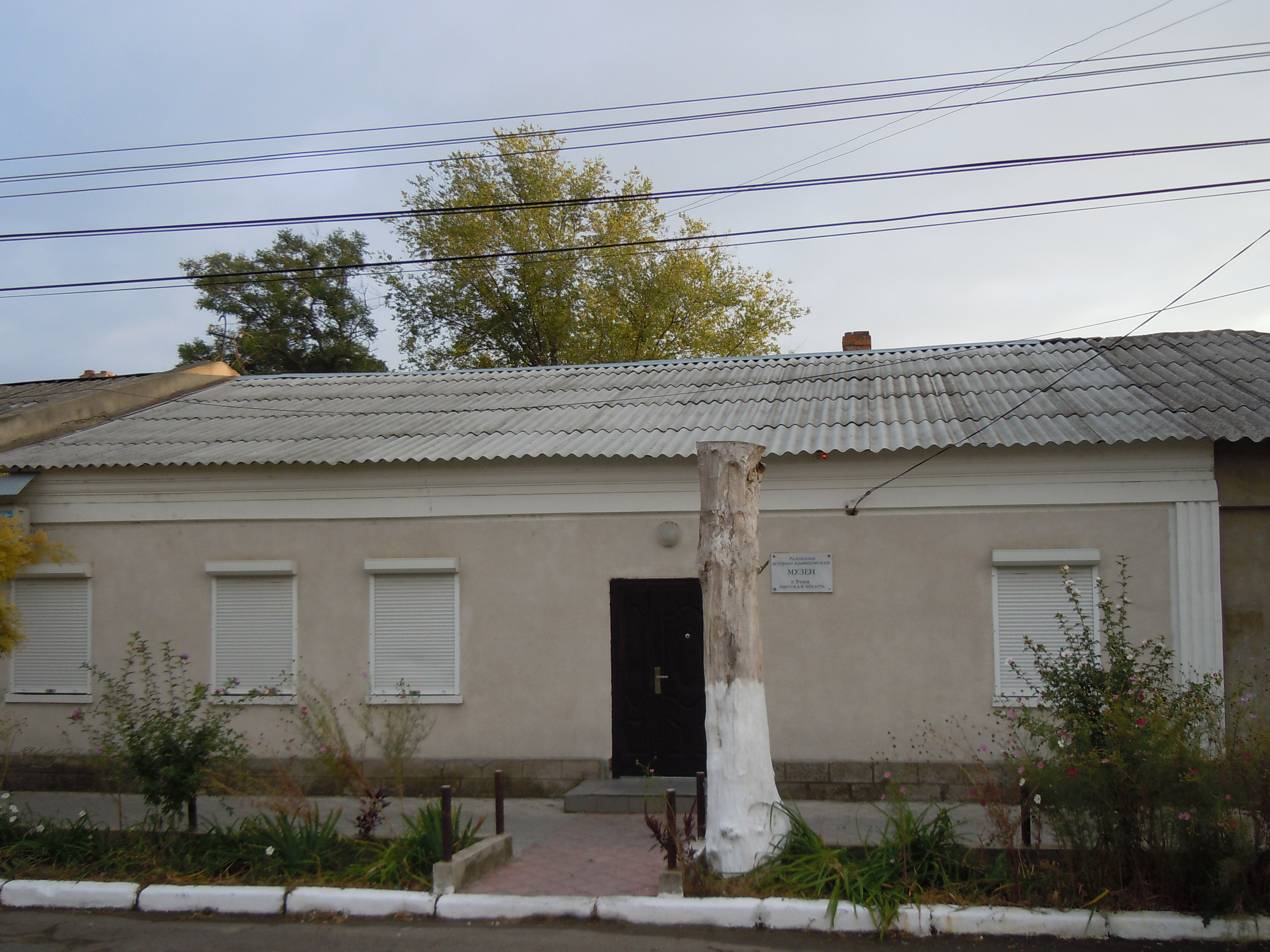
Regional History Museum

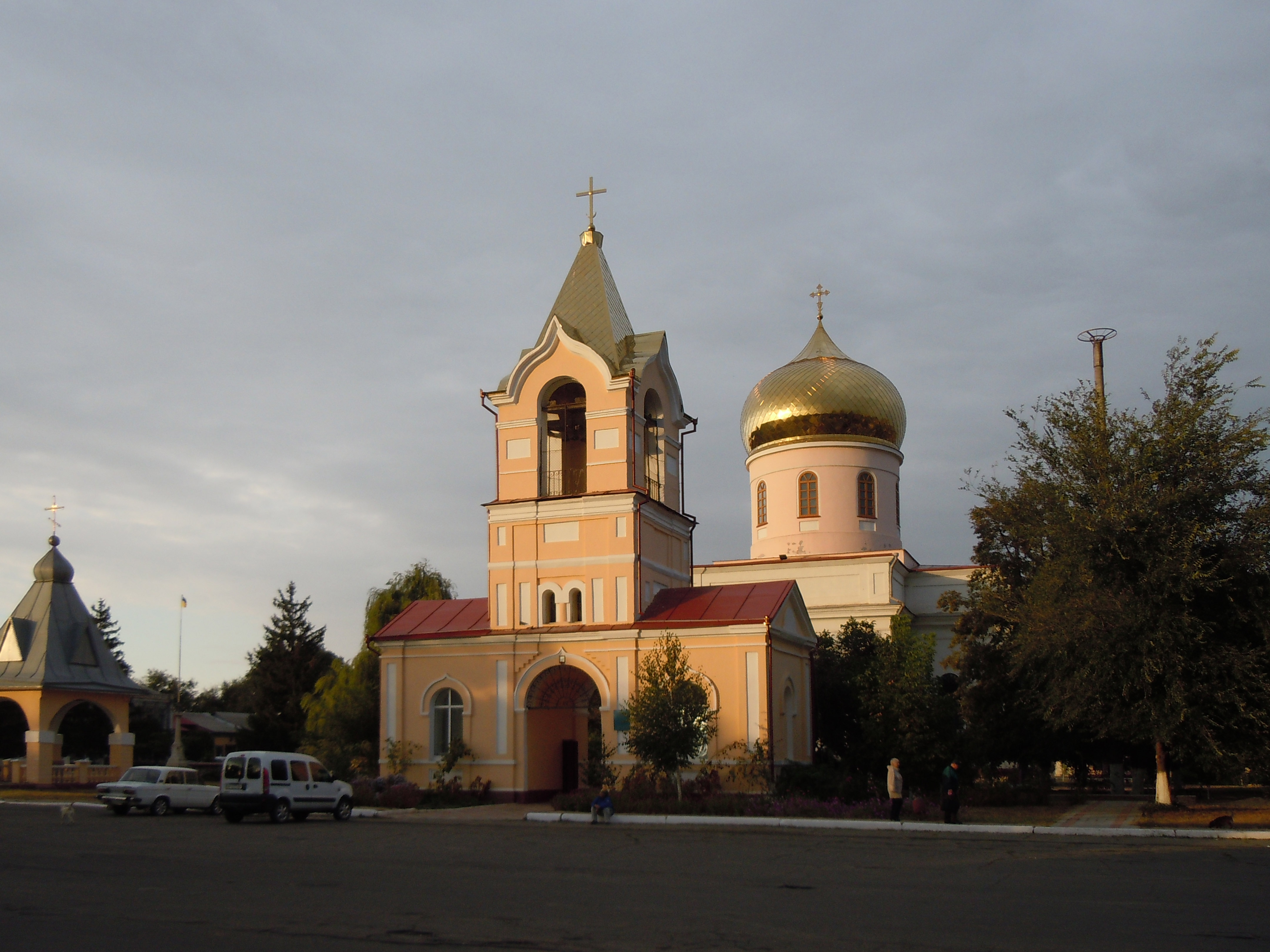
Ascension of the Lord Cathedral

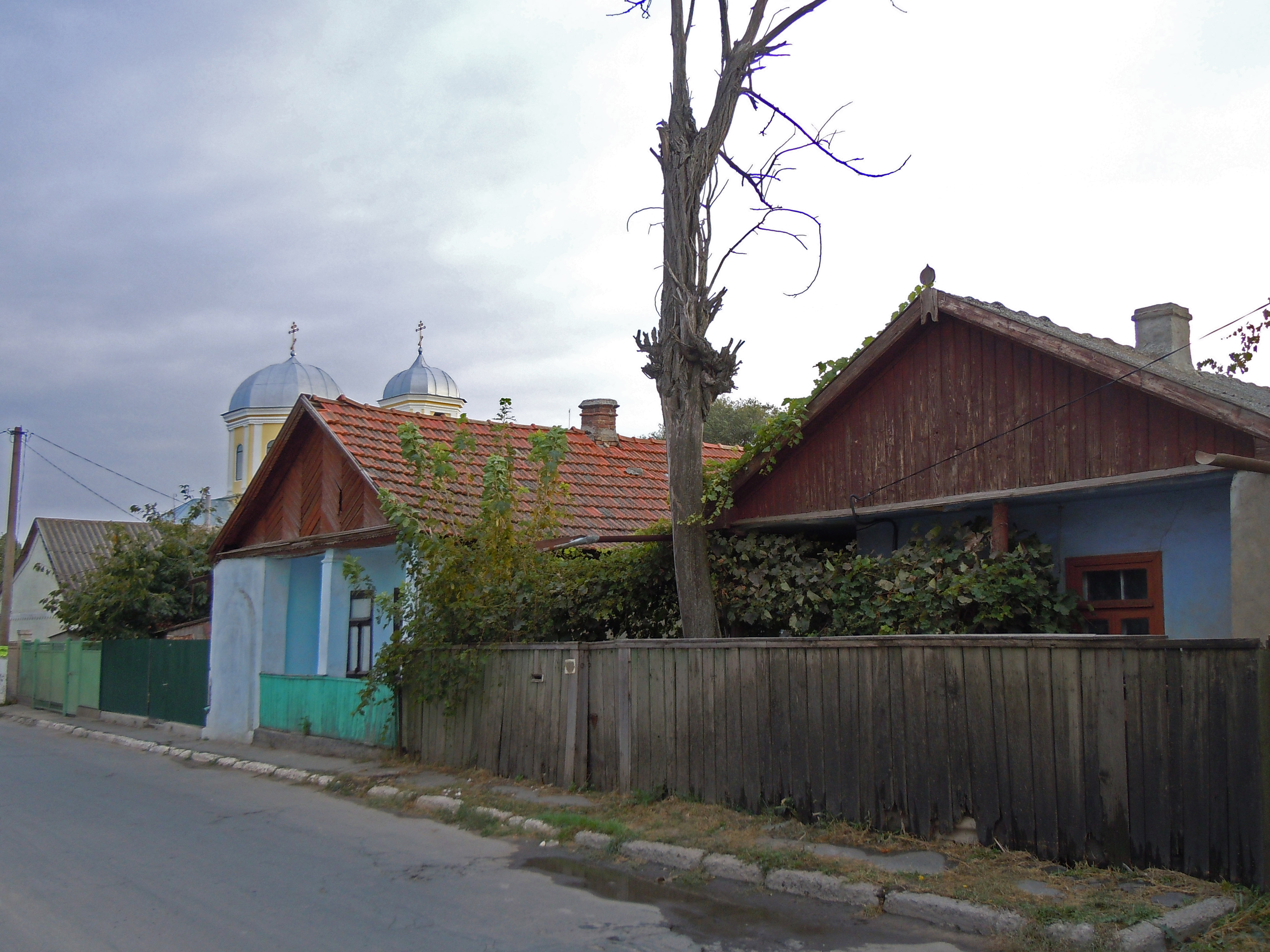
Traditional houses in Reni

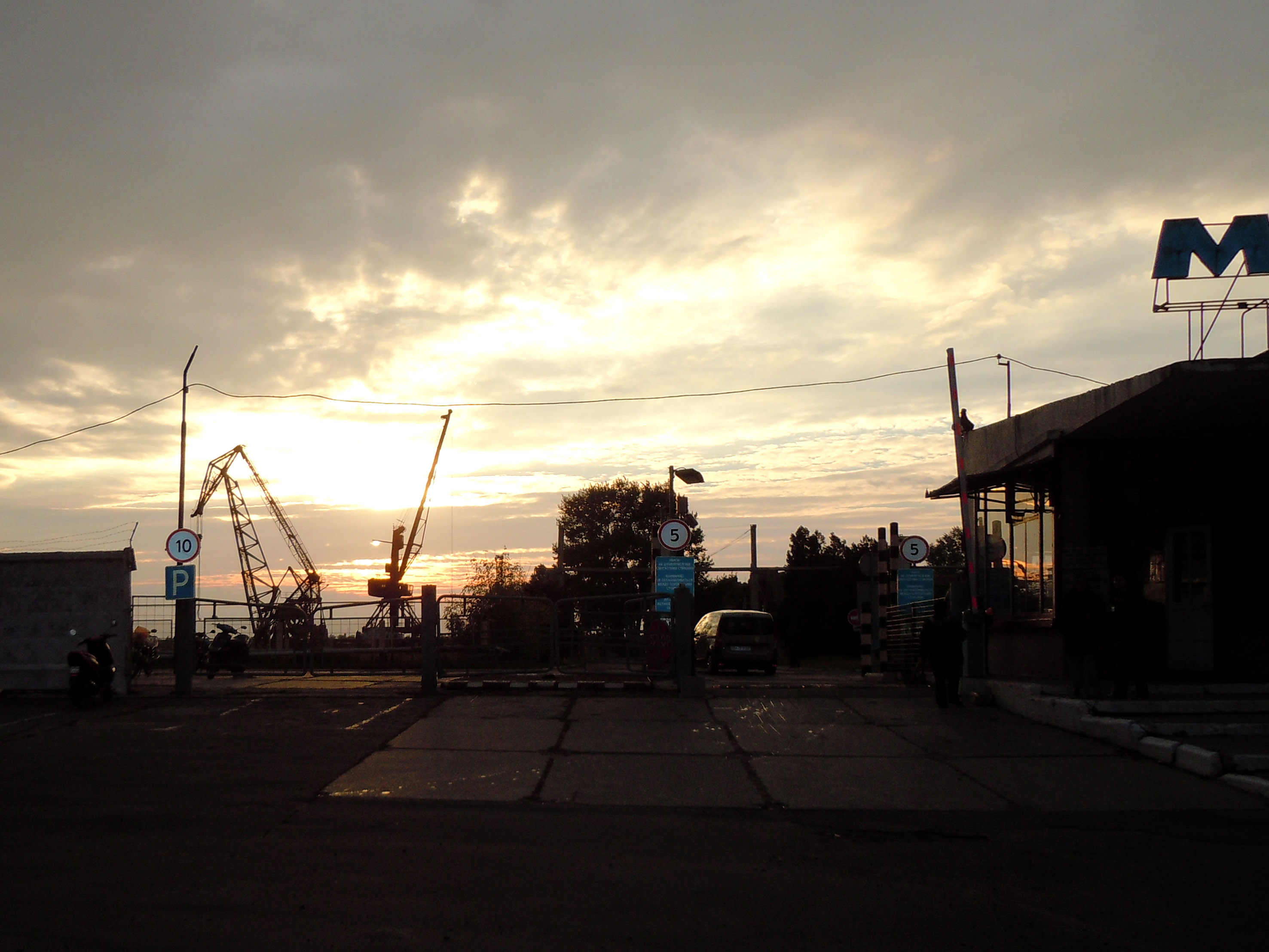
Reni Commercial Seaport

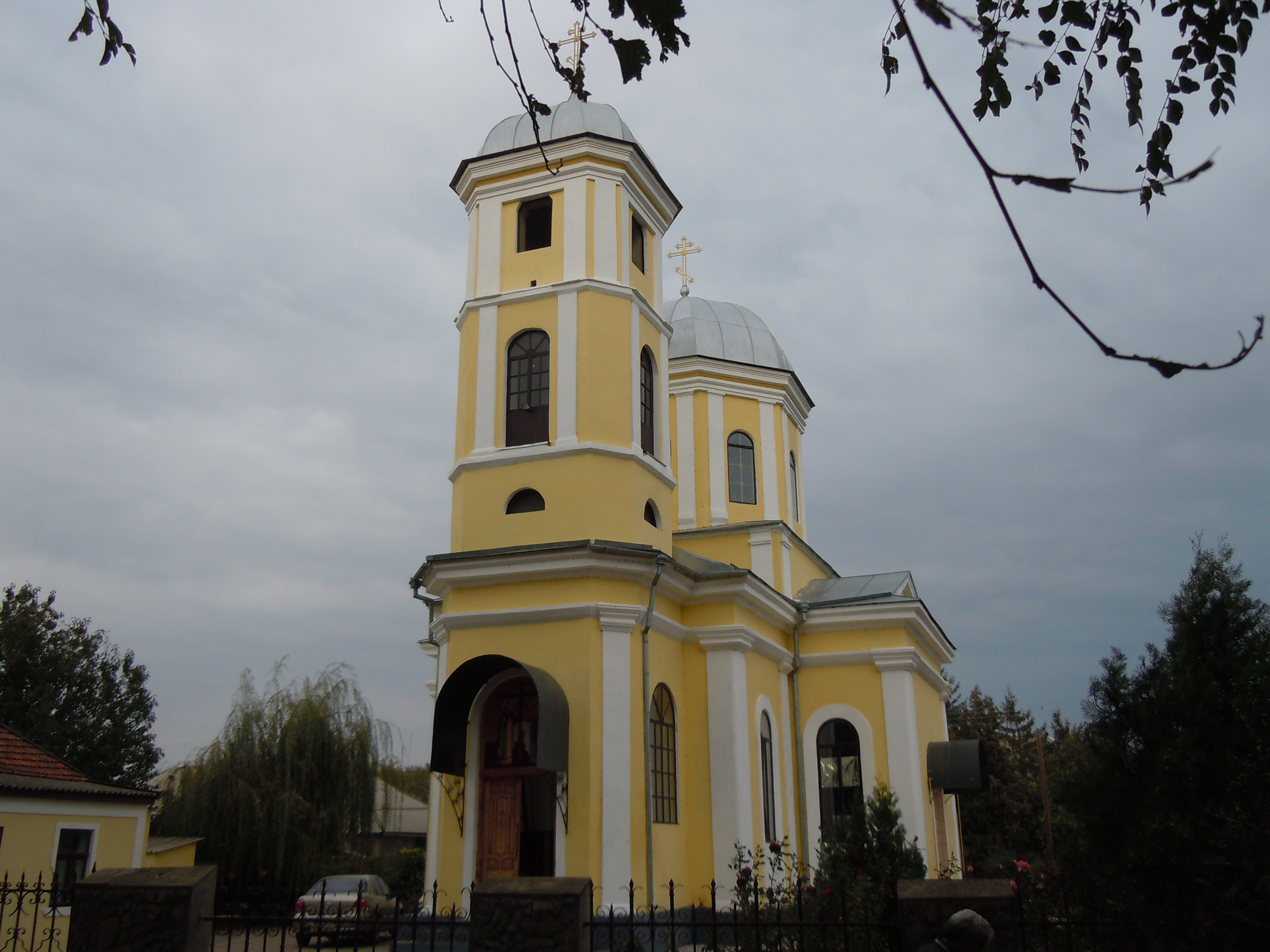
Sts. Constantine and Helena Church

== Notable people ==
- Dumitru Arabadji (born 1972), Moldovan football manager
- Maksym Braharu (born 2002), Ukrainian footballer
- Pavel Cebanu (born 1955), Moldovan footballer
- Yevhen Deidei (born 1987), Ukrainian politician and lieutenant colonel
- Alexander Deutsch (1899–1986), Soviet astronomer
- Valeriu Graur (1940–2012), Soviet Moldavian dissident and Moldovan politician
- Vitaliy Pushkutsa (born 1974), Ukrainian footballer
- Victor Zâmbrea (1924–2000), Moldovan painter
