= Petropavlivka rural hromada =

Coordinates: 46°01′4.350″N 29°56′47.278″E

Petropavlivka rural hromada Петропавлівська сільська громада
- Hromada
- Interactive map of Petropavlivka rural hromada
- Country: Ukraine
- Oblast: Odesa Oblast
- Raion: Bilhorod-Dnistrovskyi Raion
- Admin. center: Petropavlivka

Area
  - Total: 273.4 km^{2} (105.6 sq mi)

Population (2020)
  - Total: 7,822
  - Density: 28.61/km^{2} (74.10/sq mi)
- CATOTTG code: UA51040150000087491
- Settlements: 8
- Villages: 8

Petropavlivka rural hromada (Ukrainian: Петропавлівська сільська громада) is a hromada in Bilhorod-Dnistrovskyi Raion of Odesa Oblast in southwestern Ukraine. Population: 7,822 . The hromada consists of 8 villages:

- Faraonivka
- Furativka
- Miniailivka
- Starosillia
- Semysotka
- Oleksandrivka
- Petropavlivka (seat of administration)
- Pshenychne

Out of 8,811 inhabitants, 5,127 were Romanian-speaking (58.89%), out of which 5,122 called their language Moldovan (58.13%) and 5 called it Romanian (0.06%), while 2,004 were Ukrainian-speaking (22.74%), and 1,612 (18.30%) were Russian-speaking by mother tongue. The Petropavlivka rural hromada was the only hromada in the Odesa Oblast in which a majority of the people were Romanian-speaking, and declared their language as Moldovan, in the 2001 census, though the Reni urban hromada has a Romanian mother tongue plurality. The Moldovan linguistic identity population also represented a majority in four mostly Romanian-speaking hromadas of the Chernivtsi Oblast, including the Novoselytsia urban hromada the Boyany rural hromada, the Vanchykovetska rural community and the Mamalyhivska rural community, and a plurality in another one, the Mahala rural community.

== Links ==
- https://decentralization.gov.ua/newgromada/4364#
