= Reni Raion =

Former subdivision of Odesa Oblast, Ukraine

Reni Raion Ренійський район Raionul Reni
- Raion
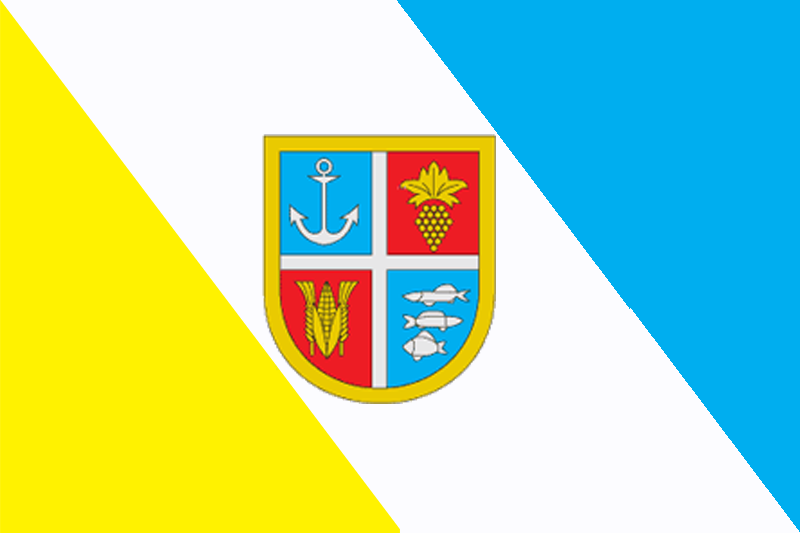
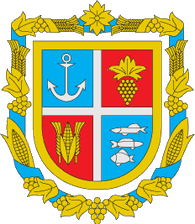
- Flag Coat of arms

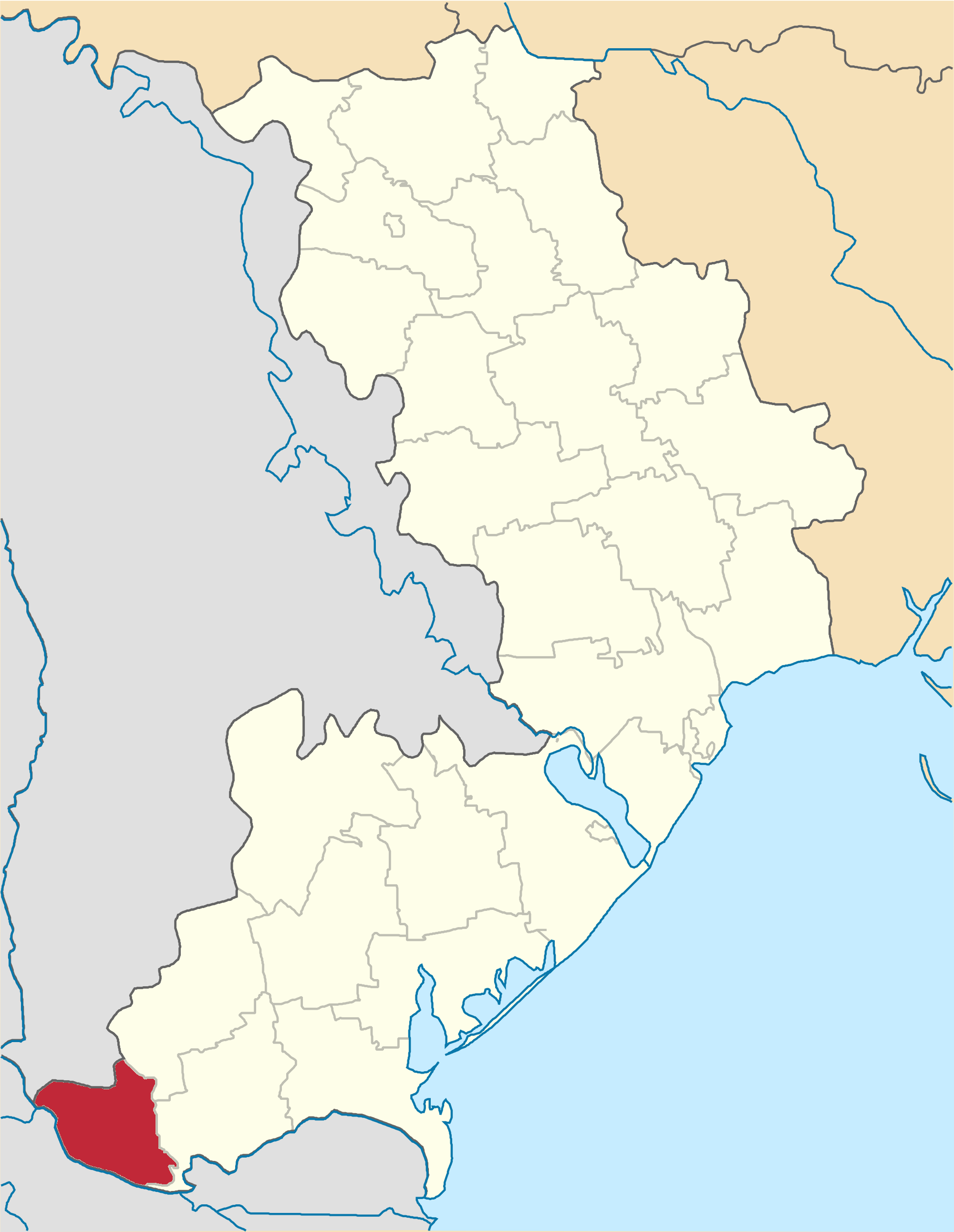
- Coordinates: 45°24′13″N 28°29′40″E
- Country: Ukraine
- Oblast: Odesa Oblast
- Established: 1969
- Disestablished: 18 July 2020
- Admin. center: Reni
- Subdivisions: List: 1 — city councils; 0 — settlement councils; 7 — rural councils; Number of localities: 1 — cities; 0 — urban-type settlements; 7 — villages; 0 — rural settlements

Government
  - Governor: Oleksandr Soshenko

Area
  - Total: 861 km^{2} (332 sq mi)

Population (2020)
  - Total: 36,117 ▼
  - Density: 41.9/km^{2} (109/sq mi)
- Time zone: UTC+2 (EET)
  - Summer (DST): UTC+3 (EEST)
- Postal index: 68800—68831
- Area code: +380 4840

Reni Raion (Ukrainian: Ренійський район; Romanian: Raionul Reni) was a raion (district) in Odesa Oblast in south-western Ukraine, in the historic Budjak region of Bessarabia. Its administrative center was the city of Reni. The raion was abolished on 18 July 2020 as part of the administrative reform of Ukraine, which reduced the number of raions of Odesa Oblast to seven. The area of Reni Raion was merged into Izmail Raion, but the Reni urban hromada has the same territory as the old Reni Raion. The last estimate of the raion population was 36,117 (2020 est.). In 2001, population was 40,680.

The raion was predominantly Moldovan and the Ukrainian language was rare. The raion of Reni, in its boundaries at that time, including the city of Reni, had 40,680 inhabitants in 2001, including 19,938 self-identified Moldovans (49.01%), 7,196 ethnic Ukrainians (17.69%), 6,136 ethnic Russians (15.08%), 3,439 Bulgarians (8.45%), 736 Gagauz (1.81%) and 36 self-identified Romanians (0.09%). The inhabitants of the former Reni Raion, which are identical to those of the current Reni urban hromada, were 37.88% Russian-speaking, 40.9% Romanian-speaking, 7.26% Ukrainian-speaking, 6.76% Gagauz-speaking and 6.61% Bulgarian-speaking. Most of villages (five) are Romanophone/Romanian-speaking, while there was one village populated mostly by ethnic Gagauz and another one was populated mostly by ethnic Bulgarians. The city of Reni had 20,761 inhabitants in 2001, including 6,694 ethnic Ukrainians (32.24%), 6,126 self-identified Moldovans (29.5%), 5,589 ethnic Russians (26.92%), 1,012 Bulgarians (4.87%), 736 Gagauz (1.81%) and 22 self-identified Romanians (0.11%). The city of Reni was mostly (70.54%) Russophone, 13.37% Romanian-speaking, 12.5% Ukrainian-speaking, 1.52% Gagauz-speaking and 1.33% Bulgarian-speaking. Most (69.41%) of the rural population of the raion was Romanian-speaking in 2001. In 2001, this was one of two of Ukraine's raions (the other one is Novoselytsia Raion in Chernivtsi Oblast) in which those having a Moldovan identity are the largest demographic group. It was also one of the three raions of Ukraine in which the Romanian language predominated until 2020; the other ones were mostly Romanian-speaking Hertsa Raion and Novoselytsia Raion.

At the time of disestablishment, the raion consisted of one hromada, Reni urban hromada with the administration in Reni. The Reni urban hromada was one of only two hromadas in the Odesa Oblast in which the Romanian language predominated; the other one was the mostly Romanian-speaking Petropavlivka rural hromada, self-identified as the Moldovan language by most inhabitants in the 2001 Ukrainian census.
