= Gagauz people in Russia =

Total population
- 9,272 (2021)

Regions with significant populations
- Moscow Oblast: 2,004
- Khanty-Mansi Autonomous Okrug: 1,009
- Kaluga Oblast: 645
- Moscow: 520
- Yamalo-Nenets Autonomous Okrug: 492

Languages
- Gagauz; Russian

Religion
- Eastern Orthodox

Gagauz people in Russia (Russian: Гагау́зы в Росси́и) are people in of Gagauz ancestry in the Russian Federation, according to the 2021 Russian census there were around 9,272 people who identified as ethnic Gagauz in the Russian Federation.

== History ==
Historical Gagauz population in Russia
Year	Pop.	±%
1926	830	—
1959	3,012	+262.9%
1970	3,704	+23.0%
1979	4,176	+12.7%
1989	10,040	+140.4%
2002	12,210	+21.6%
2010	13,690	+12.1%
2021	9,272	−32.3%
Source: These don't include speakers of the Gagauz language who identify as Bulgarians.

The first Gagauz-Bulgarian (Note: Historically the Gagauz people identified and called themselves Bulgarians or Bulgars and speakers of Bulgarian. Distinction between Bulgarians and Gagauz has come about fairly recently. There are reported rare cases Gagauz people also identifying as Greeks. Many Gagauz communities in Russia and Central Asia still continue to identify as Bulgarians to this day. Due to this distinguishing between the two groups can be difficult.) villages in the Russian Empire came about in the mid 18th century, when Gagauz and Bulgarian people from the Balkans settled the Russian Empire, due to persecution and pressure from the Ottoman Empire. Various waves of Gagauz-Bulgarian immigration waves followed over the centuries, Gagauz and Bulgarians would migrate to Southern Ukraine, Crimea, the Sea of Azov area and Novorossiysk, areas which were under the control of the Ottoman and Russian Empires. In eastern Ukraine, Bulgarians were a sizable minority and took part in the founding of New Serbia and Slavo-Serbia.

At the time of Budjak's annexation by the Russian Empire in 1812, the Bessarabian Bulgarians and Gagauz population numbered 25,000. However, immigration from Bulgaria proper continued during the numerous Russo-Turkish wars.

By the late 19th century in Bessarabia, Gagauz peasants struggled with a serious land shortage problem, which was the main factor driving migration. This led Gagauz to settle in the Caucasus and Central Asia, areas which were conquered and depopulated and which the Russian authorities were keen on settling with Christian peasants.

In the late 19th century, there were reports of Gagauz and Bulgarians buying and renting land in the North Caucasus, mainly in modern-day Prokhladnensky and Maysky Districts in Kabardino-Balkaria and Mozdoksky District in North Ossetia–Alania. The incoming settlers were sometimes assigned to existing villages, but more often settled on farmsteads. In the Northern Caucasus many Gagauz and Bulgarians settled the Vasilenko (Russian: Василенко) hutor which was founded in 1890, near Nizhnii Kurp (Russian: Нижний Курп). Later, the Gagauz and Bulgarians began to resettle due to overcrowding in Nizhnii Kurp to the neighboring villages in Lesser-Kabardia. The village of Malgobek, later Nizhniy Malgobek (Russian: Нижний Малгобек) in North Ossetia–Alania, was founded by refugees from Nizhnii Kurp in 1926 as a mixed settlement in the territory that was then part of the Kabardino-Balkarian Autonomous Oblast. Approximately half of the village's inhabitants were Gagauz-Bulgarians and the other Kabardians. Gagauz-Bulgarian settlers could also be found in dozens of villages around the area like: Yekaterinogradskaya, Sukhotskoye, and the town of Mozdok.

Relations with the locals were steady as the colonists occupied only purchased or leased lands, not those confiscated from the local populations. Under the Stolypin reform, the activities of the Peasants' Land Bank were extended, making more colonists able to purchase land and farms. But inter-ethnic tensions rose with the outbreak of the Russian Revolution, exacerbated over issues regarding shortage of land. To resolve this issue, the Gagauz and Bulgarians from Kabardino-Balkaria were resettled in Semipalatinsk Oblast, where previous settler communities from Bessarabia existed. Though from 1925-1926 several families returned to their former homes in the Northern Caucasus, due to inability adapt to the climate. Some families resettled in Crimea and Zaporizhzhia, while others migrated to Central Asia and settled in Maiskoye, near Tashkent.

During the post war period Gagauz populations and migrants from the Caucasus founded new communities throughout the Russian SFSR, primarily in the southern regions, where more than a quarter of all Russian Gagauz were concentrated in 1959. New communities were also established in the northwest, the Volga region and the Urals. By 1989 the largest community of Gagauz could be found in central Russia.

After the dissolution of the Soviet Union, there was a mass influx of guest workers from Moldova. The large majority settled in either Moscow Oblast or for seasonal jobs in more remote areas. In 2004 more than half (56%) of all Gagauz migrant workers worked in the Russian Federation, the second biggest destination being Turkey (34%). Much like other migrants from Moldova, not all Gagauz hold Russian Federation citizenship and a sizable portion of the Gagauz community in the Russian Federation consists of migrant workers. According to a study conducted by the Institute for Social Analysis and Forecasting, a research unit within the Russian Academy of National Economy and Public Administration, the number of Moldovan citizens in the Russian Federation was about 76,645 in 2022.

Gagauz people in Northern Caucasus still sometimes identify as Bulgarians. According to the 2021 census in the republic North Ossetia–Alania and Kabardino-Balkaria 54 people identify themselves as Gagauz, while 157 people identify as "Mozdok Bulgarians". In Mozdok, the National and Cultural Bulgarian-Gagauz Society "Brotherhood" was founded in 2008.

== See also ==
- Bolgarka, Kazakhstan
- Crimean Bulgarians
- Budjak Horde
- Volga Bulgaria
