= Bolharka =

Bolharka may refer to several places in Ukraine:

- Bolharka, Pervomaisk Raion, Mykolaiv Oblast
- The former name of Sofiivka, Sofiivka rural hromada, Berdiansk Raion, Zaporizhzhia Oblast

== See also ==
- Bolgarka
