= Dumitru Topciu =

Bessarabian Gagauz politician (1885–1942)

Dimitrie Topciu
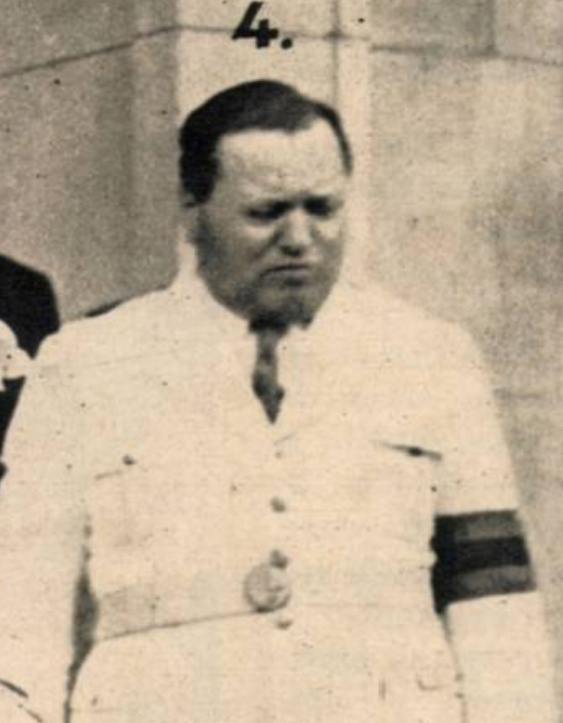
- Topciu in FRN uniform, 1940

Romanian Undersecretary of State for Agriculture
- In office July 4 – September 14, 1940

Member of the Senate of Romania
- In office June 2, 1939 – September 1940
- Constituency: Agricultural

Member of the Romanian Assembly of Deputies
- In office June 1926 – July 1927
- In office June 1931 – July 1932
- In office December 25, 1933 – February 1938
- Constituency: Tighina County

Member of Sfatul Țării
- In office November 1917 – May 18, 1918
- Constituency: Bulgarian–Gagauz caucus

Member of the Provisional Council of the Russian Republic
- In office October 7 – November 7, 1917
- Constituency: Peasant caucus

Chairman of the Provisional Council of Bender Uyezd
- In office September 3, 1917 – March 22, 1919

Personal details
- Born: Dmitriy Topçu (Dimitri Georgevich Topchu); September 2, 1888 Tomai, Bessarabia Governorate, Russian Empire
- Died: 1958 (aged 69–70) Bucharest, Romanian People's Republic
- Resting place: Bellu Cemetery, Bucharest; 44°24′14″N 26°06′00″E
- Party: Bulgarian–Gagauz Organization (1917); PP (c. 1922–1931); PND (1931–1932); PNA (1932–1935); PNC (1935–1938); Union of National Awareness (1939); FRN (1939–1940)
- Spouse(s): Evdochia (died 1937); Lucreția Fășie-Ralea (married 1940)
- Profession: Lawyer, agriculturalist, businessman

Dumitru or Dimitrie Gheorghe Topciu (Gagauz: Dmitriy Topçu, Bulgarian: Димитър Топчу, romanized: Dimitar Topchu, Russian: Дмитрий Георгиевич Топчу, romanized: Dimitri Georgevich Topchu; September 2, 1888 – 1958) was a Romanian politician and agriculturalist of Bessarabian birth and Gagauz ethnicity. Originally a subject of the Russian Empire, he established his reputation as a lawyer and advocate of peasant welfare, also networking between the Bessarabian Gagauz, Romanians, and Bulgarians. He formed a Bulgarian–Gagauz caucus after the February Revolution, seeking representation inside the Russian Republic, and overall shunning Romanian nationalism. After his mandate in the Provisional Council of the Russian Republic was cut short by the October Revolution, he was sent to Sfatul Țării, which acted as a legislative body of the Moldavian Democratic Republic. Topciu was absent during its March 1918 vote on that polity's union with Romania; by his own testimony, he assisted the Romanian expeditionary force, in his other capacity as the provisional leader of Bender Uyezd. After escaping prosecution for his alleged smuggling activities along the Dniester, he settled in Tighina, entering Romanian politics as a member of the People's Party.

In interwar Greater Romania, Topciu became a proponent of Gagauz assimilation, embracing forms of Romanian nationalism which came to be ridiculed in the press; he was also outspoken in his resistance to Gagauz re-Turkification. In tandem, he was a leader of the Agricultural Syndicate in Tighina County, a champion of the winemakers' corporate interests, and simultaneously a temperance activist, who spoke out against the consumption of Bessarabian moonshine. He won his first mandate in the Assembly of Deputies after elections in 1926, being returned in 1931 as an affiliate of the Democratic Nationalist Party. Topciu served additional terms during which he veered from agrarianism to fascism, affiliating with the National Agrarians (1932), the National Christian Party (1935), and the Union of National Awareness (1939). Touring the Budjak subregion, he had a major contribution in canvassing Gagauz votes for Romania's far-right groups.

Topciu was finally recruited by King Carol II into his catch-all National Renaissance Front, which resulted in his peak political activity, as Undersecretary of State for Agriculture in the Gigurtu cabinet (1940). He supported Ion Antonescu's takeover of the country, as well as his alliance with the Axis powers. Having been chased out of Bessarabia by a Soviet invasion in 1940, he became an organizer of formal and informal efforts to assist his fellow refugees. Topciu managed to survive the establishment of a Romanian communist regime in 1948. He was harassed and had to pay a fine for his involvement with the black market, also serving a short sentence in Caransebeș Prison; he lived his final decade in obscurity, at his new home in Bucharest.

== Biography ==
=== Early life and Sfatul ===
Topciu was born on September 2, 1888, among the Gagauz people in Tomai, Bessarabia Governorate (now in the Gagauz Autonomous Unit of Moldova). His patronymic was rendered in Romanian as Gheorghe (shortened to Gh.), though some Russian records have Davydovich; his political associate Gheorghe Cuza knew him primarily as Mitia (from the Russian pet name, Mitya). Topciu tied his Gagauz identity to Eastern Christianity rather than Turkishness, since, as he explained in a January 1937 speech, the Gagauz "never even passed through Asia Minor." After training as a lawyer at an unspecified university, he became an activist on behalf of the Bessarabian peasants and frequented the political circles of Kishinev (Chișinău). Like the fellow Gagauz Pavel Guciujna, he was also sympathetic to the aspirations of Bessarabian Romanians—including their quest for autonomy inside the Russian Republic, after the February Revolution. He was acquainted with activist Gherman Pântea, who allegedly followed Topciu's advice when meeting with Vladimir Lenin, leader of the Russian Bolsheviks, in April 1917, to probe him about the far-left's views on the issue of national determination.

Topciu also supported this autonomist agenda while attending the Congress of Bessarabian Co-operativists in late 1917. On September 3, 1917, he became chairman of the provisional council in Bender (Tighina) Uyezd. He was assigned as a peasant delegate to the Provisional Council of the Republic in Petrograd on October 7, but lost his seat with the Bolshevik coup of November 7. Topciu's political adversaries claimed to have uncovered evidence that he had come to oppose Romanian nationalism as embodied by the National Moldavian Party, forming, and presiding upon, a committee of the Bulgarians and Gagauz. A 1926 note in Cuvântul newspaper had it that Topciu, "a native Gagauz, belonged back in 1917 to a Bulgaro-Gagauz soviet that had been set up in southern Bessarabia to fend off the Moldavians." In 1937, Dreptatea republished a manifesto used by Topciu in his campaign for the legislative election of October–November 1917, contesting a Bessarabian seat in the Russian Constituent Assembly. This document spoke about "the Moldavians" as engaged in an usurpation of Russian statehood and in a forced Romanianization of the Bessarabian province, comparing them to the Black Hundreds.

Following a concurrent corporate election, the Gagauz-and-Bulgarians obtained five seats in the autonomous legislative council, Sfatul Țării, which subsequently became a parliament of the Chișinău-based Moldavian Democratic Republic. Topciu was among those elected by "a certain 'Bulgarian–Gagauz organization', which probably included smaller associations." Also elected at the time, Krste Misirkov initially specified that he himself represented a Bulgarian National Party in Bessarabia; historian Ivan Duminică reports that as many as 19 deputies, including Topciu, had full or partial Gagauz or Bulgarian ethnicity, though some, such as Nicolae Alexandri and Alexei Culeva, did not represent that ethnic bloc. Among the Bulgarian-and-Gagauz deputies, Topciu and Anton Novakov were absent at the Sfatul session of March 27, 1918, in which the majority voted for union with Romania; their colleagues inside the Bulgarian–Gagauz organization abstained, while Bulgarian Ștefan Balmez voted against union. Ten years after the fact, both Novakov and Topciu explained that they were absent on official duty, to ensure provisions for the republican militia; this mission ran parallel with the Romanian military intervention in Bessarabia, with Topciu also acting as a liaison for the Romanian Land Forces in Tighina.

Topciu's mandate in Sfatul ended on May 18, 1918, when the Bulgarian-and-Gagauz delegation replaced him with another community member. His mandate in Bender Uyezd lasted to March 22, 1919, though he continued to live in Tighina to 1940. As noted by politician and memoirist Constantin Argetoianu, around 1920 "my buddy Topciu" was involved in smuggling on either bank of the Dniester. At the time, the Romanian authorities had promised to exchange old rubles for lei, at a rate that was slightly advantageous for ruble holders. Topciu was allegedly captured while entering Romania with rubles he had procured in Soviet Ukraine. Argetoianu was serving as both Finance and Interior Minister, and as such claims to have "kept [him] out of jail, allowing him to build a glorious career as a patriotic nationalist." In the early 1920s, Topciu joined the local Chamber of Agricultural Credit as administrator-delegate, alongside his Sfatul colleagues Balmez and Gheorghi Cara. Topciu was eventually recruited by Alexandru Averescu's People's Party (PP). He headlined its Assembly of Deputies list for the legislative election of March 1922 in Tighina, with Bulgarians Nicolae Petrov and Iacov Cunev as the runners-up.

=== Romanian agrarianism ===
Topciu's sympathy toward Romanian nationalism was made explicit after 1926, when he became a contributor to Onisifor Ghibu's magazine, România Nouă. A February 1934 article by Ion Dimitrescu suggests that his political colleagues were much amused by his continued inability to speak proper Romanian—his "highly original" phonetics and his "boorish accent that's not yet fully polished" (accentul bocciu insuficient dat la tocilă). The same point was raised by parliamentary reporter C. Balș, who commented that Topciu was "still not reconciled with [Romanian] grammar". As Topciu's political rival, Virgil Madgearu once confronted him about his linguistic incompetence, to which Topciu replied (noting Madgearu's own non-Romanian origin): "I speak Gagauz, and you speak Aromanian [sic], everyone speaks as best they can."

Topciu maintained his political profile as the old Uyezd was transformed into a Tighina County, serving as leader of the PP's county lodge. In this capacity, he supported an alliance with the National Liberals for the August 1925 elections to the agricultural chambers—in contrast to other PP militants in Bessarabia, including his Gagauz colleague Guciujna. Topciu himself was sent to the Assembly after elections in May–June 1926, in what Cuvântul labeled as a surprising victory—"Romanians are astonished, while foreigners poke fun; as well they should." He came in first of four PP deputies for that county, with Vladimir Chiorescu, Ion M. Leon, and Nicolae Stoianoglo holding the other three seats, and with Madgearu of the opposition Peasants' Party taking a remaining fifth seat. Topciu earned more attention and ridicule from Cuvântul journalists in July, when he took the rostrum to declare that: "It was I who united Bessarabia with Romania!" Also then, Topciu openly accused Madgearu's Peasants' Party of shielding the illegal Communist Party and Soviet "terrorists", and of recruiting at least one Gagauz who had spied for the Central Powers.

A former deputy after the elections of July 1927, Topciu found himself investigated by the Brătianu cabinet. In August, his home in Tighina was raided by the local prosecutor's office. Various documents were confiscated, and Topciu's arrest was announced as imminent. The PP's Îndreptarea of October 21 reported that he had been lawfully elected chairman of Tighina's county council, but that the results had been swiftly invalidated upon government pressure; Leon, who had defected to the National Liberal caucus, was then proclaimed as elected. On March 11, 1928, an "enduring animosity" between him and Leon turned violent. Reportedly, Topciu had taken the liberty of presiding a meeting of the county council, of which he was not a member; this irregularity upset Leon, who stormed into the hall and hit Topciu, until being evicted by the Romanian Police.

In May 1930, Topciu was a Tighina County delegate at the PP congress in Bucharest. By the time of new elections in June 1931, he had rallied with the Democratic Nationalist Party (PND) list, or "National Union", emerging to take the third Assembly seat in Tighina, after Leon and Tancred Constantinescu. His defection disorganized the local PP; in August, academic Florin Sion was called in from Iași to act as his successor. Commuting to Bucharest, in November Topciu helped form a cultural and political society called Agrarian Youth of Romania, which was chaired by Nicolae D. Cornățeanu. In early 1932, he was also chairman of the Tighina Agricultural Syndicate. In this capacity, he supervised the public consultation at Tighina's Capitol Cinema, during which his colleagues complained about the effects of the Great Depression and the overall unsoundness of debt relief policies imposed by the PND.

Topciu was by then a supporter of poet-activist Octavian Goga, who discarded the PP to establish his own National Agrarian Party (PNA). The PND leader and Prime Minister, Nicolae Iorga, noted on April 10, 1932 that Topciu and Sergiu Niță had been "beguiled" (smomiți) by Goga, and were abandoning the governmental arc altogether. Beginning in that month, Topciu helped to form PNA sections in Gagauz areas, and "managed to attract many of his brethren to the party." Memoirs left by Gh. Cuza claim that he was drawn into the new group by its title, which suggested a commitment to mainline agrarianism, rather than by its hard right-wing component.

Topciu was frustrated by the law which awarded land to all pro-Romanian members of Sfatul, since he was technical disqualified by his absence from the union vote. Like Novakov, he sued the Ministry of Agriculture in 1928. Topciu's case was reviewed in February 1932, when he was awarded a 50-hectare estate in Ceadîr-Lunga, and again in August, when he was ordered to hand it back. The former Uyezd chairman headlined the PNA list in the Assembly election of July 1932, being described in Dimineața daily as "quite well-known in the villages, and surrounded by valuable men". Overall, the PNA only took 1,783 votes and eighth place in that county, which registered a major win for the National Peasants' Party (PNȚ), with 10,770 votes; the Goga group was outflanked by the ultra-nationalist National-Christian Defense League (LANC), a matter which contributed to Topciu's defeat. Topciu was again a Tighina candidate in December 1933. He took 12.4% of the vote, and was confirmed on Christmas Day as the only opposition candidate to take a seat in that precinct. Upon winning, he complained that the election of his PNA colleagues had been prevented by the Duca cabinet, with direct intimidation by the Gendarmes.

=== Radicalization ===
Around that time, Topciu was associating with Constantin Garoflid and Eftimie Antonescu of the Winemakers' Syndicate. In 1933, he was dispatched by his colleagues to neighboring Poland, which was the only major importer of Bessarabian wine, and where he hoped to obtain an intensfication of economic exchanges. On April 2, 1934, he attended a congress of the Syndicate chapters in Western Moldavia and Bessarabia. Elected one of its regional vice presidents (alongside Hagi Anton and Vladimir Cristi), he demanded that government place a ban on distilling cereals, as well as on the circulation of wood vinegar. At the Syndicate's Imobiliara Hall meeting in June, he also decried the competition of moonshine, claiming: "in Bessarabia they're just about all intoxicated on rectified spirit, which presents a very concerning situation." As a temperance activist, Iuliu Scriban also quoted him as saying that "in Bessarabia they drink twice as much as they did under the Russians." In January 1935, Topciu and Constantin C. Giurescu had set up a "winemakers' parliamentary bloc", which was directed against the propagation of hybrid grapes.

Topciu had also become the local leader of the Goga party in Tighina, preserving this post after July 1935, as the group became the National Christian Party (PNC) upon merging with the LANC. Described by Dreptatea as a former "anti-Romanian" and "presently a Nazi", Topciu was credited by Gh. Cuza, by then his PNC superior, with having "provided the party with massive support from the minority population of the county." On August 25, 1935, Chișinău hosted the first PNC Bessarabian congress. This affair was largely staged by Topciu: "To transport people to Chișinău, he ordered 6 railway wagon to be brought in at Tighina station, and 2 wagons at Ceadîr-Lunga station". During the proceedings, he also presented the only female affiliate—described by Cuza as "a Gagauz or Bulgarian woman, though I can't say for sure"; "the unfamiliar melody of her speech brought a smile to the faces of those sitting behind the podium." Cuza and the PNC's Bessarabian leader, Constantin N. Tomescu, initially quarreled with Topciu, who, as an old-time agrarianist, "did not understand the need for a new rhythm of national struggle [and] did not want to submit to the strict discipline of Cuzist ideology". This conflict gave way to a "close camaraderie, [in which] I learned to appreciate his qualities and flaws." The two men were publicly associated with each other and with Nichifor Robu as early as January 1936, when they toured Suceava County to campaign in the by-elections. The local National Liberal paper, Glasul Bucovinei, alleged at the time that they had engaged in electoral intimidation, including by temporarily "kidnapping" in Cacica the PNȚ candidates, namely Mihail Ghelmegeanu and Teofil Sauciuc-Săveanu.

Gh. Cuza viewed his Gagauz associate as fully compatible with the PNC doctrines, since these addressed all "Romanian minorities of the Christian faith, with the aim of fraternal cooperation in the name of the common good." The shared platform focused on antisemitism, with Jews rated as former allies, turned into "implacable enemies of the Romanians". In his Assembly speeches, Topciu himself argued that the Gagauz, whom he estimated a 120,000 individuals, were loyal subjects of the state and adherents of the Romanian Orthodox Church; as noted by the parliamentary reporter at Lupta, the message meant to scold those Gagauz activists who were cultivating Kemalism and Pan-Turkism. It was also warning against potential Islamization and Turkification, questioning if it was sound for the 40 Gagauz communes to have "Mohammedan teachers" giving lessons in Turkish. Topciu's identification with Romanian Orthodoxy also surfaced in his sponsoring a law project to nullify Romania's Concordat, since this had afforded state recognition to Roman Catholicism. The Orthodox mouthpiece, Telegraful Român, praised him as a Romanian patriot.

Meanwhile, Topciu's conflicts over agrarian issues has sparked a national controversy: in 1934, he accused Gurie Grosu, the Orthodox Metropolitan of Bessarabia, of having staged an illegal land grab in Bumbăta and Rezina. On June 4, 1936, he contributed to another scandal involving the bishopric, after he showed up at the church meeting in Chișinău alongside Tomescu, who was wearing a swastika lapel. The PNȚ's Pan Halippa protested against this "pagan" display; Topciu violently interrupted his speech, being in turn struck down by Haralambie Marchetti. Nic. Ionescu, of the nationalist monthly Prut și Nistru, saw Topciu's intervention as an attempt to restore order, against Halippa and Guciujna: "There was one man who held up a finger, and who instantly brought peace and quiet to the room; his name is Topciu. He improvised his speech on the spot, but it came out logically. He never riled up the crowd, and never lost his temper." On September 27, Topciu and Colonel Eugen Adamovici presided upon a Comrat rally of the PNC, where Topciu received the organizational banner. On the occasion, he declared his loyalty to the Romanian Crown, informing the Gagauz public that Christians were engaged in a defensive war against "the kikes"—he viewed Jewish subversion as responsible for both the Soviet experiment and the Spanish Civil War; he also proposed a restructuring of the agricultural chambers and co-operatives, beginning with the elimination of Jewish business interests.

In the local elections in July 1937, Topciu ensured a comfortable win for the Tighina PNC, including a seat for himself on the county council. Just days after, his stances created schisms within his PNC chapter: former LANC members rebelled against his leadership, describing him as a profiteer who had capitalized on their popularity. They also resented him for assigning political offices to the newer PNC recruits—including Vladimir Sereda, formerly of the PNȚ. Topciu described the controversy as a one-man intrigue by Vladimir Croitoru, whom he expelled from the party in September; by then, Sereda had been confirmed as the PNC organizer in Bulboaca. Ahead of a new legislative election in December, he toured Bessarabia alongside Cuza and two Bulgarian PNC-ists, Gheorghe Colac and Vladimir Novițchi. He was prevented from campaigning in places such as Comrat by the terminal illness of his first wife, Evdochia. She ultimately died in August of that year.

=== FRN ascent and downfall ===
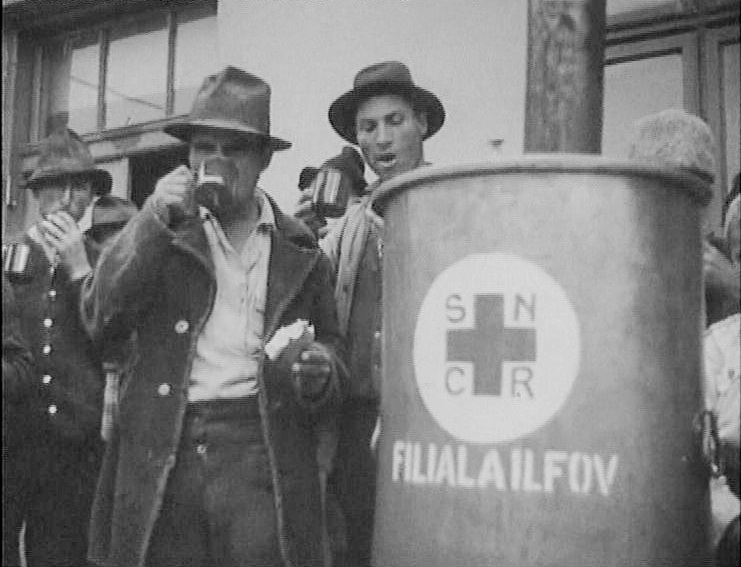
Bessarabians fleeing the Soviet invasion, at Romanian Red Cross station in Ilfov County

Topciu was returned to the Assembly as the only PNC deputy elected for Tighina (with 19.9% of the vote). In the aftermath, he emphasized national unity, arguing that: "the National Christian Party is here to assist each and every man, regardless of their political persuasion." On January 31, 1938, he was tasked with drafting Tighina's PNC lists for the scheduled elections. Liberal democracy was ended within less than a month by King Carol II, who staged a self-coup and promulgated his authoritarian constitution, including a nominal ban on all parties. Topciu found himself prosecuted for still engaging in partisan propaganda after that date, but was acquitted in June by a Bessarabian military court. Before the end of the year, Carol began exercising his dictatorial authority through the National Renaissance Front (FRN). A secretary of A. C. Cuza's Union of National Awareness, Topciu followed the other party leaders in joining the FRN during October 1939.

Topciu took a seat in the Senate of Romania in the one-party elections of June 2, 1939. Selected as a representative of the agricultural profession, he co-sponsored legislation to fully reestablish a system of guilds. Alongside Halippa and other, he was a guest for the Feast of the Baptism celebration held at Chișinău on January 6, 1940, used by Carol as a celebration of Greater Romania. In February 1940, he was also serving as manager of the Winemakers' Syndicate; in this capacity, he helped draft a new law on the protection of Romanian wine. On January 7, he had married a second time, to Lucreția Fășie-Ralea, sister of the sociologist and FRN politician Mihai Ralea. He became a legal tutor of her two sons from a previous marriage, Radu and Mircea Fășie. Carol was considering a limited reward for his "Cuzists", promising them three prefectures, two of which were in Bessarabia—Topciu was supposed to lead Tighina County, and Gh. Cuza was assigned Bălți County. On February 11, the king reduced his offer, only assigning offices to Topciu and Istrate Micescu (the latter of whom refused all such appointments, in protest against what he saw as a marginalization of the Cuza faction).

Topciu abandoned his Bessarabian properties on June 28, 1940, immediately after the region was stormed into and annexed by the Soviets; as Duminică notes, he feared arrest by the NKVD. This happened to Major Zeletin, his right-hand man at the Tighina PNC, who was detained at Vorkutlag until 1955. Topciu moved permanently to Bucharest, where he had become a landlord, having built himself a 6-storey mansion on the corner of Tunari and Eminescu Streets. On July 4, the Gigurtu cabinet was formed, signaling Romania's attempted rapprochement with Nazi Germany, and he joined it as Undersecretary of State for Agriculture. On July 7 he helped establish a Committee for Assisting Refugee Agriculturalists, tied to the Union of Agricultural Syndicates and overseen by Garoflid. A month later, he paid a visit to the winemakers of Panciu, in Putna County, assuring them of his ongoing support.

The Carol–Gigurtu regime came down on September 4, 1940, when Ion Antonescu took over as executive leader, or Conducător. Topciu was allowed to keep his post for ten more days, until the proclamation of an Iron Guard government, the "National Legionary State". On September 17, he was moved to the Ministry of Foreign Affairs, as head of the new General Commissariat for Refugees. Topciu was no longer serving in any official capacity in February 1941, when he was petitioning the Ministry of Agriculture as a delegate of the Winemakers' Syndicate. In April, he and his wife were awarded 250,000 lei from a legal settlement in Fălciu County. Topciu lived out the remainder of World War II, which witnessed Romania's partnership with the Axis powers on the Eastern Front and a temporary (1941–1944) recovery of Bessarabia. In mid-1942, he published two political essays about the positioning of Romania's agrarian economy within the German New Order. As paraphrased by Universul daily, these advised Romanians to "support the efforts undertaken by our most patriotic Marshal Antonescu, who has committed himself to making Romania more beautiful and stronger." Immediately following the anti-Antonescu coup of August 1944, though his camp had lost its political supremacy, he continued to assist Gagauz refugees. One of these was Ion Capsâz of Tomai, who became doorman of his Tunari offices—and who, in turn, assisted others fleeing the Budjak.

Along with all other officials of the 1940–1944 regimes, Topciu was legally stripped of his voting rights and eligibility ahead of the November 1946 election. In April of that year, the Romanian People's Tribunals, which investigated war crimes, had issued an invitation for "D. Topciu of Bucharest, last known domicile at No 6 Tunari Street" to participate in an interrogation. He survived the establishment of a Romanian communist regime in early 1948, but was arrested in June under suspicions of sabotage, and prosecuted in October. The charges referred to his status as a manager of Nistriana-Matex Society in 1941–1944. Specifically, he and other six people, including a Dumitru D. Topciu, who was his son, were due to face trial for having allegedly trafficked "thousands of meters of silk" on the black market. He was sentenced in December 1948 to pay a fine of 6,000 lei; his son was not charged. Topciu went on to serve time in Caransebeș Prison, alongside old-regime figures such as Ion Costinescu and political dissidents such as Anton Dumitriu. The latter recounts that they were huddled up together with some thirty other prisoners, and regularly tormented by a zealous warden; however, Dumitriu also reports that the conditions were overall better than in other communist prisons. Topciu himself survived confinement, and was allowed to go free after a relatively short period. He is known to have lived his final years in Bucharest, dying there in 1958. He was buried at the local Bellu Cemetery. The politician was survived by Lucreția, to her death in November 1974, and by his two children—Dumitru Jr, a trained lawyer, and Eugenia, who worked as a physician.
