= Gajals =

Turkish-speaking Muslim ethnic group of the southeast Balkans

Gacallar

Total population
- 300,000

Regions with significant populations
- Bulgaria (Ludogorie) Turkey (Eastern Thrace)

Languages
- Balkan Gagauz Turkish; Gagauz; Turkish; also: Bulgarian

Religion
- Sunni Islam

Related ethnic groups
- Gagauz, Turkish people

Gajals or Gadzhals (Balkan Gagauz Turkish: Gacallar) are a Turkic ethnic group living mainly in the Eastern Balkans and Turkey. Gajals mainly settle in the northeastern Ludogorie region of Bulgaria, as well as in the region of Eastern Thrace. Because of the Turkic language, and the Islamic faith, Gajals are usually ranked as a subgroup among Turks. Balkan-Gagauz is the main language, and the total number of Gajals is about 300,000 people, including about 20,000 native speakers. They are believed to be descendants of Pechenegs and Cumans. They are closely related to the Gagauz people, leading to claims that they are both essentially the same people, with the only difference being religion.

== History ==
The term Gajal was first used in Ahmed Vefik's dictionary Lehçe-i Osmani written in 1873–1876. According to him, Gajal was a word used to describe gypsies of Varna and Balchik. In fact, his dictionary is the only Turkish dictionary which mentions this word. The Yearbook of the Varna State High School by the Škorpil brothers (Hermann Škorpil and Karel Škorpil) from 1898, says:

"In our research we paid attention to the questions - what happened to the first non-Slavic Bulgarians? Is it possible that these people, who won, disappeared completely in two centuries, mixed with Slavs, whose character was completely opposite to the character of the ancient Bulgarians? We came to an opinion that cannot be final until more material is collected, namely: that today's Muslim population of Deliorman - the Gajals, and perhaps the Christian Gagauz in Eastern Bulgaria are the remnants of non-Slavic Bulgarians."

Soon their theory became very popular and was accepted by a number of historians, such as Gavril Zanetov, one of the supporters of the Turkic theory of the origin of the Bulgarians. Zanetov perceived both the Gajals and the Gagauz as descendants of non-Slavic Bulgars. His source was also the Škorpil brothers - but with one difference - he added that the Alevi population of Balbunar, Silistra and Varna were also Bulgarians who had converted to Islam, because

"they give sacrifice for St. Elijah (actually Ali, local Christians believed that Ali was related to the Christian Elijah, which is not true), drink and don't hide their faces".

Lyubomir Miletich was another historian who also supported the Škorpil brothers' theory in his book The Old Bulgarian Population in Northeastern Bulgaria from 1902. Miletich, who had visited the Ludogorie region wrote in his book that:

"they (Turks of Deliorman) are old inhabitants, they did not come from Asia Minor, as the Turks from Tuzluk (region covering most of Targovishte) did, and that from time immemorial their ancestors knew each other as locals."

His other claims were that the Deliorman Turks have a different language and dialect.

In 1906 Stefan Bobchev visited the region to collect information about the Deliorman Turks and about Bulgars' origin. He was accompanied by Matei Stoyanov, Tsonyu Boyadzhiev and Mehmed Sülüş during his trip. He was in these Turkish villages, all in the Ludogorie region: Duştubak (Yasenovets), Abdal Yunus (Yonkovo), Duraç(Ludogortsi), Mumcular (Sveshtari), Köse Abdi (Raynino), Eniceköy(?), Caferler (Sevar), Şeremetköy (Veselets) and Ahmetler(?). Contrary to the claims of the Shkorpil brothers, Miletich and Zenetov, Bobchev did not find people who called themselves Gajal in Deliorman. According to him, the term is clear only to educated Bulgarians who have learned this word from books, but even they do not claim that the local Turks call themselves "Gajal". However, through conversations with the Turkish population of Ludogorie, he learned that this term was used offensively to the Turks of Dobruja. This may explain why Naiden Gerov in his dictionary (1895-1905) gives meaning to the word gajal "stupid, brutish, predatory". The Turks from Dobruja used the pejrorative "tahta külah" for Turks of Ludogorie. Bulgarians in Shumen and Razgrad - two cities where many Turks live - used the word Gajal as an insult to Turkish villagers. Bobchev found that the term was familiar even in Stara Zagora and Haskovo - in the first city it was again used contemptuously for Turkish peasants, and in the second it was used for Turks with big çalma (Bulgarian: Gajva). The term Gajal was known in Balkan villages too such as Elena and Zlataritsa, but it also had negative meaning. According to Stefan Bobchev: "the Deliorman Turks call themselves Turks. They say: "ben Türküm" (I am a Turk). The more cultured ones say that they're Ottomans." Although the Deliorman Turks did claim to be autochthonous, they also claimed to came from Konya, Haymana, Ankara and Eskişehir. About the alleged language differences, Bobchev says: "they (Turks of Ludogorie) have different dialect, just like we and other nations also have many dialects. Nothing more. And there can be no question of racial and tribal differences based on linguistic differences." Bobchev is also trying to find the origin of the term gadjal. According Moshkov, it means in Turkish "rich, strong". According to Bobchev, the word gajal is of Bulgarian origin and related to the word gajva.

Valentin Moshkov, on the other hand, claims that the Deliorman Turks - he admits that Turks of Deliorman call themselves "Turk" and not Gajal because they don't know this word - are descendants of Pechenegs. Zehra Kaderli, a Turkish woman from Ludogorie also says that although she worked in Ludogorie and collected ethnographic material from local Turks, she never came across Turks who call themselves Gajal. She herself is from the Ludogorie and says that the term is unknown to her family. She is an associate professor at Hacettepe University and has many research on Deliorman Turkish culture.

It is believed that the Gajals were a pre-Ottoman community that lived in the Ludogorie region and that they came from the same origins as the Gagauz.

== See also ==
- Ludogorie
