= Tomai, Gagauzia =

Tomai Tomay
- Commune
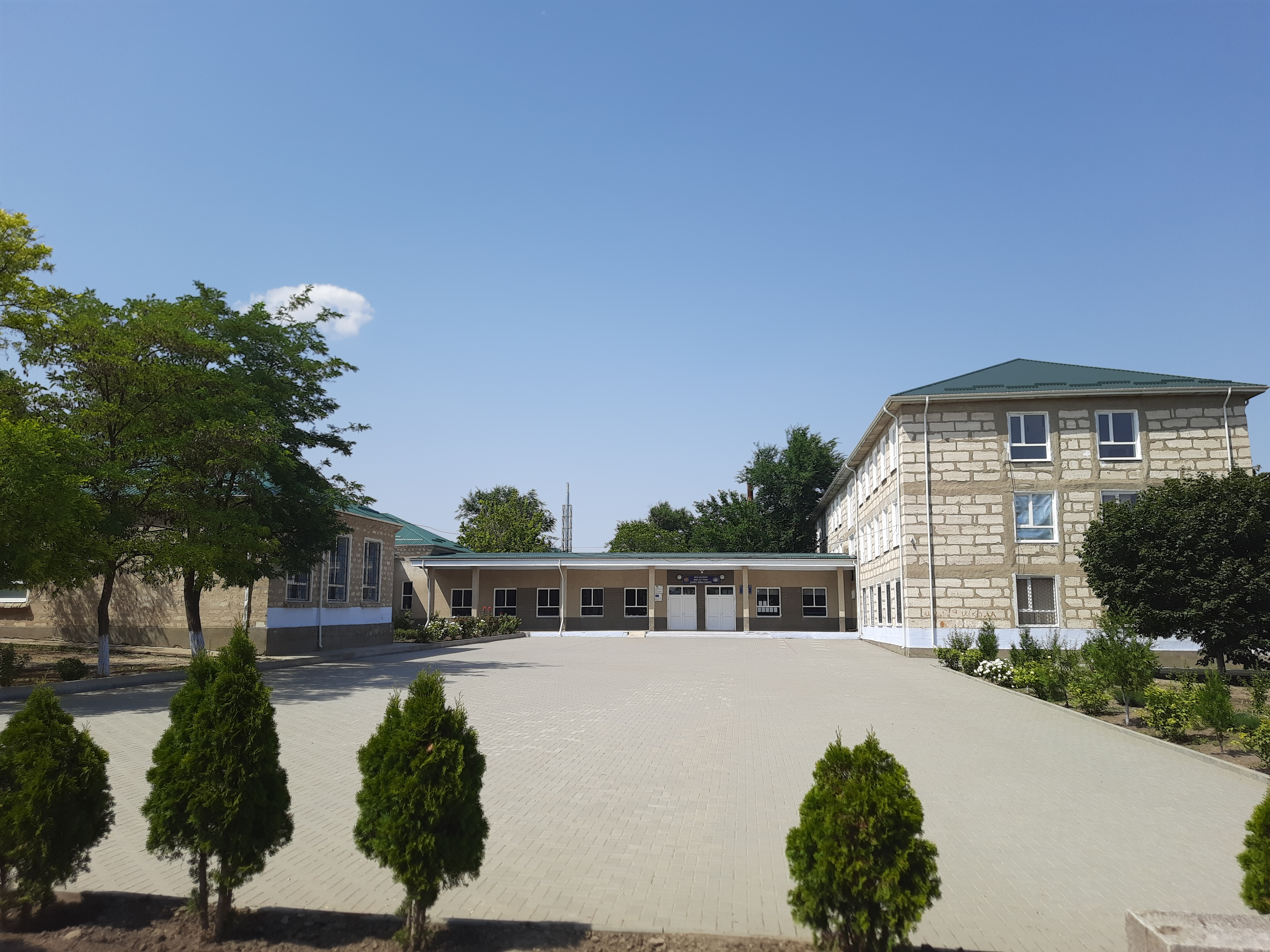
- Tomai Theoretical Lyceum

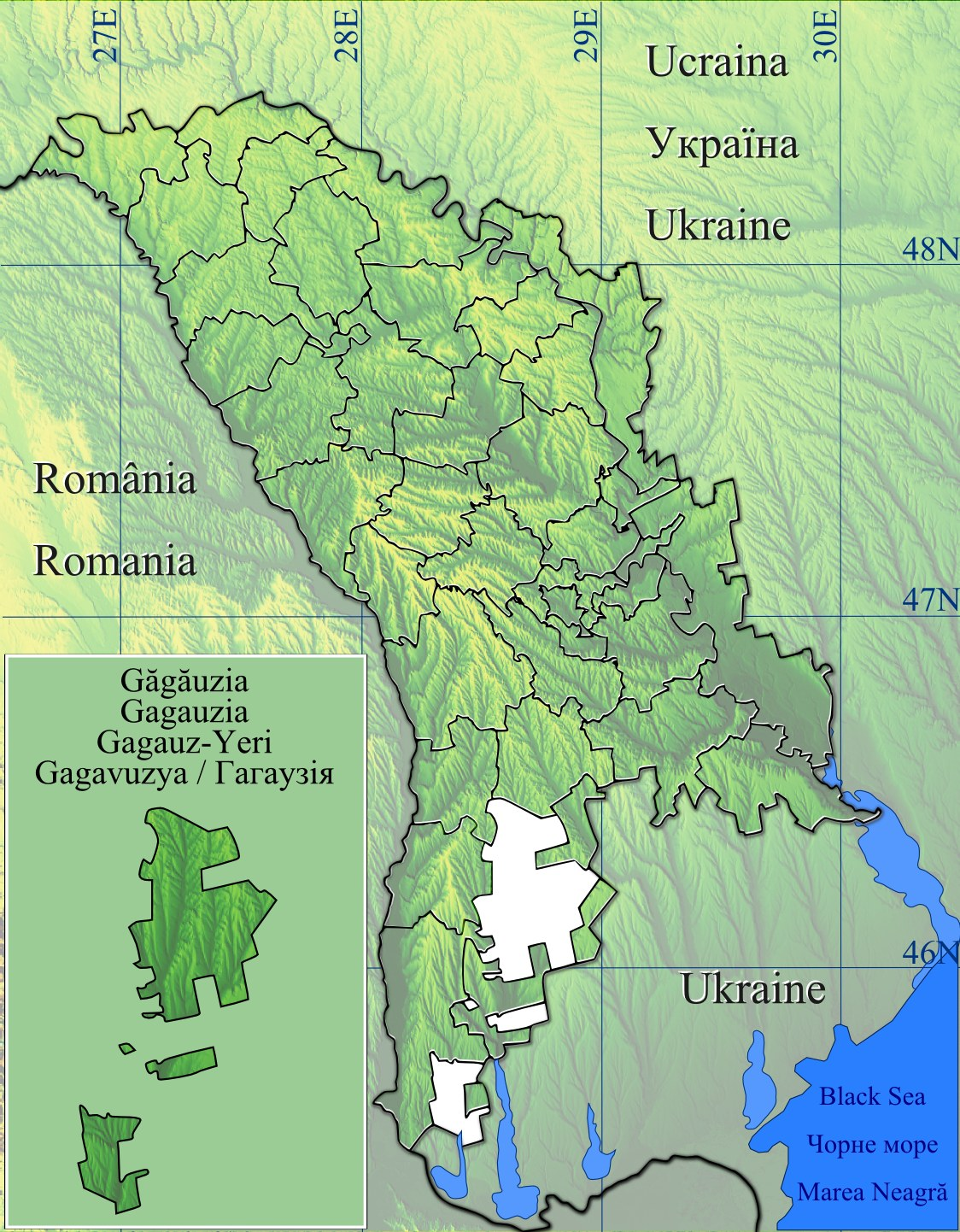
- Location of Tomai in Moldova
- Coordinates: 46°10′54″N 28°46′03″E
- Country: Moldova
- Autonomous Region: Gagauzia
- Founded: 1817

Government
  - Mayor: Dmitrii Kyosya

Population (2024)
  - Total: 3,026

Ethnicity (2024 census)
  - Gagauz people: 93.12%
  - Moldovans: 1.94%
  - other: 4.94%
- Time zone: UTC+2 (EET)
- Climate: Cfb

Tomai (Gagauz: Tomay) is a commune and village in the Ceadîr-Lunga district, Gagauz Autonomous Territorial Unit of the Republic of Moldova. According to the 2024 Moldovan census the commune has 3,026 people, 2,818 (93.12%) of them being Gagauz.

== History ==
The first documentary mentions of the village of Tomai are dated to 1790. The area was settled by the Nogai Tatars, which were expelled by the tsarist government. The new commune was formally founded in 1817 by Gagauz refugees from the Varna region in Bulgaria. After 1820 several Romanian families from the Cahul region followed. Around 1864, the "Dormition of the Mother of God" church was built.

== International relations ==
=== Twin towns — Sister cities ===
Tomai is twinned with:

- Büyükkarıştıran, Turkey;

== Notable people ==
- Dumitru Topciu (1888–1958), Gagauz Romanian politician and agriculturalist
