= Uzes (people) =

Extinct Turkic peoples

Uzes were a group of medieval Turkic people in East Europe. They were known as Tork in Russian chronicles. Like most medieval Turkic people, they were Tengrists.

== Early years ==
The roots of Uzes can be traced back to Oghuz Yabgu State (750-1055) located to the east of Caspian Sea. Oghuz State was the neighbour of the Khazar Khaganate in the west and north of the Caspian Sea. Oghuz-Khazar relations were not stable. Oghuz State was sometimes an ally and sometimes an enemy of the powerful Khazar Khaganate. In the 10th century a group of Oghuz people fought in the Khazar army. (Dukak, the father of Seljuk was one of them.) They fought mainly against Pechenegs, a rival Turkic people. After the Khazar Khaganate disintegrated, they had to move west because of Kypchaks raids from the east.

== Later years ==
In 1054 they settled around Dnieper river. However five years later they were defeated by the Kievan Rus. They further moved west to Danube river where they were repelled by their old enemy the Pechenegs in 1065. After 1065 they paid homage to Byzantine Empire and the Russian princes. Most of them converted to Christianity. They served as soldiers in the Byzantine Empire. During the battle of Manzikert between the Byzantines and the Seljuks in 1071 they served in the right flank of the Byzantine army. However, according to some accounts they switched sides and contributed to the Seljuks victory.

Uzes settled in Marmara, Western Black Sea, Central Black Sea, Central Anatolia and Thrace, most of them hybrid with Turkmens and assimilated to Muslim Oghuz Turks.

== Aftermath ==
Some Turkologists including Vasily Radlov proposed that Gagauz people and some of the Manav People are descendant of Uzes. According to that view the origin of the name Gagauz is Gök Oguz ("Sky Oghuz"). However this view is not universally accepted by other scholars.
