= Dmytrivka, Bolhrad Raion, Odesa Oblast =

Rural locality in Odesa Oblast, Ukraine

Dmytrivka Дмитровка
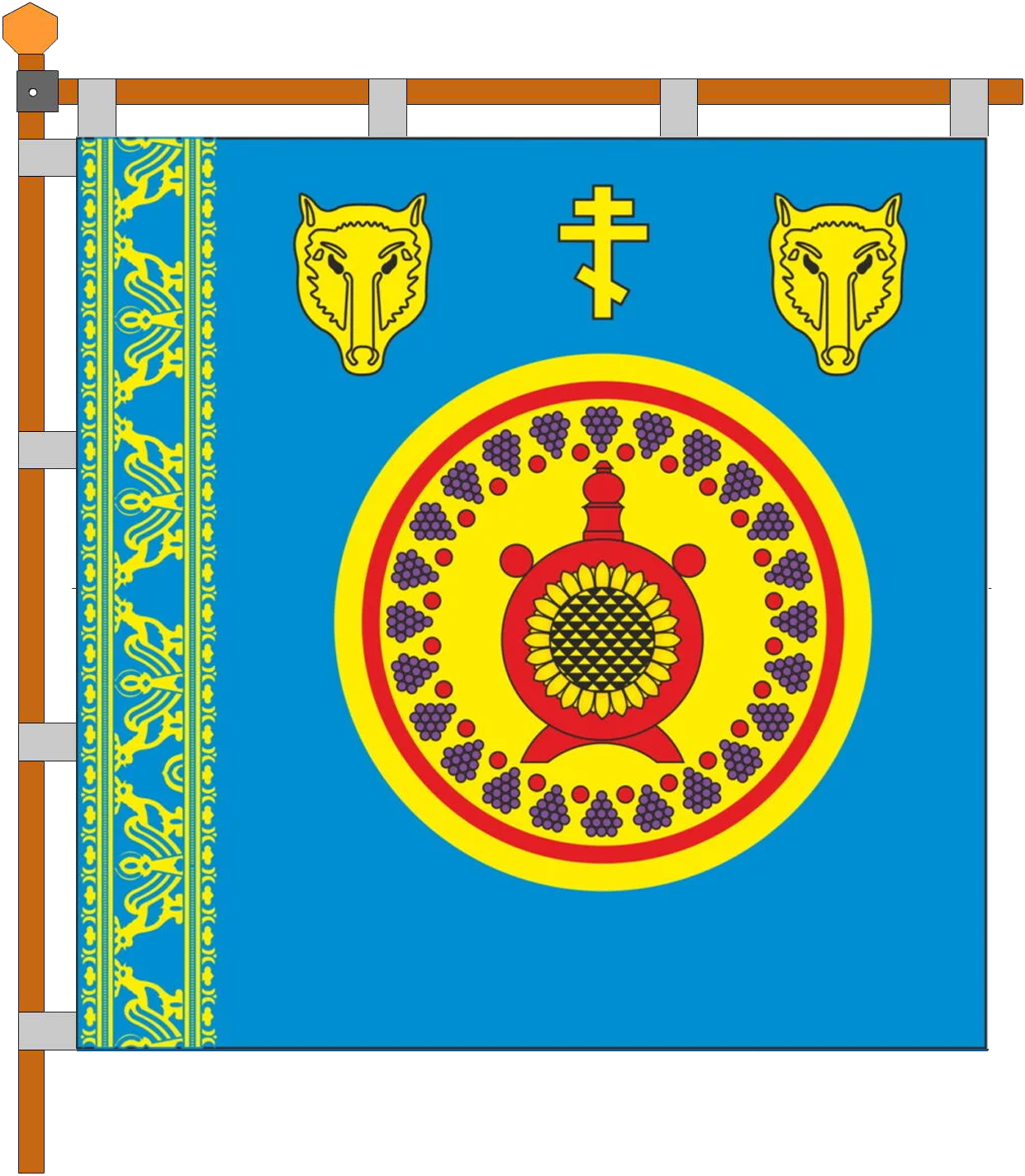
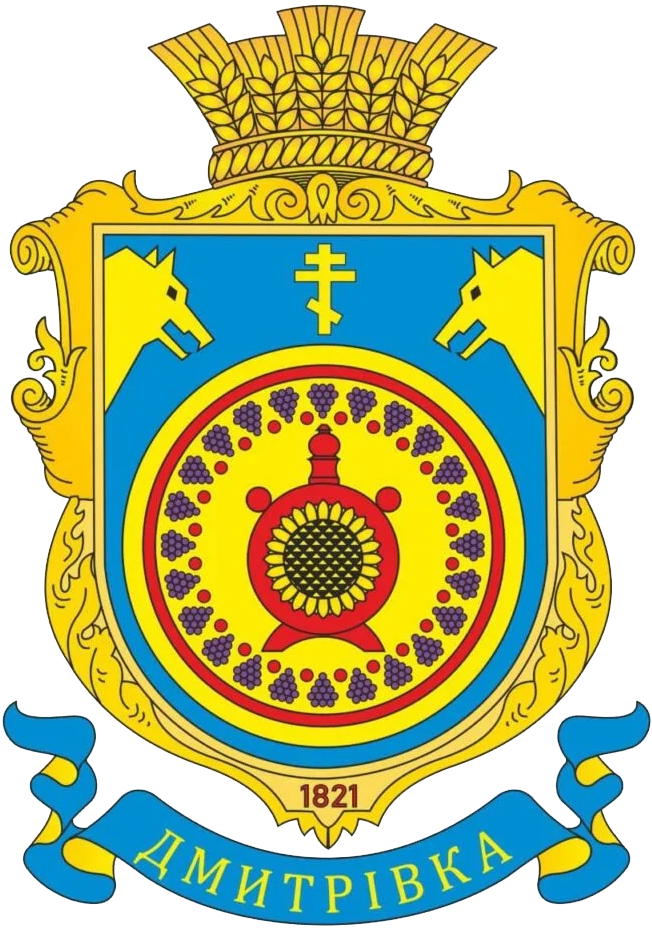
- Flag Coat of arms

- Location in Ukraine Location in Odesa Oblast
- Coordinates: 45°58′N 28°59′E
- Country: Ukraine
- Oblast: Odesa Oblast
- Raion: Bolhrad Raion
- Hromada: Horodnie rural hromada

Population (2001)
  - Total: 4,806
- Time zone: UTC+2 (EET)
  - Summer (DST): UTC+3 (EEST)

Dmytrivka (Romanian: Dumitrești) is a village in Bolhrad Raion, Odesa Oblast, Ukraine. It belongs to Horodnie rural hromada, one of the hromadas of Ukraine. It is predominantly populated by Gagauz.

== Notable people ==
- Mykola Palas (born 1980), colonel during the Russo-Ukrainian War, recipient of the Hero of Ukraine award
