= Gagauz people =

Turkic ethnic group of southern Moldova and southwestern Ukraine

Gagauz people Gagauzlar
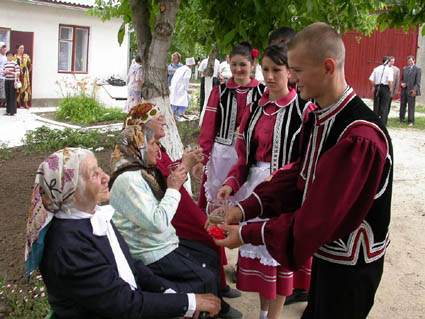
- Gagauz people in traditional clothing

Total population
- c. 150,000

Regions with significant populations
- Moldova (excl. Transnistria): 98,200 (2024 census)
- Ukraine: 25,000
- Russia: 9,272
- Turkey: 5,400
- Transnistria: 4,999 (2015 census)

Languages
- Gagauz; Romanian; Russian

Religion
- Eastern Orthodox Church

- People: Gagauzlar
- Language: Gagauz; Gagauz dili / Gagauzça)
- Country: Gagauzia; Gagauz Yeri / Gagauziya

The Gagauz (/ɡæɡæˈuːz/; Gagauz: Gagauzlar) are a Turkic ethnic group native to southern Moldova (Gagauzia, Taraclia District, Basarabeasca District) and southwestern Ukraine (Budjak). Gagauz are mostly Eastern Orthodox Christians. The term Gagauz is also often used as a collective naming of Turkic people living in the Balkans, speaking the Gagauz language, which is separate from Balkan Gagauz Turkish.

== Etymology ==
Gagauz is the most widely accepted singular and plural form of the name, and some references use Gagauzy (from Ukrainian) or Gagauzi. Other variations including Gagauzes and Gagauzians appear rarely.

Before the Russian Revolution they were commonly referred to as "Turkic-speaking old Bulgars". Gagauz agricultural settlers in Uzbekistan called themselves "Eski Bulgarlar" (meaning Old Bulgars) in the 1930s.

According to Astrid Menz:

Older ethnographic works such as Pees (1894) and Jireček (1891)—both covering the Gagauz in Bulgaria—mention that only their neighbors used the ethnonym Gagauz, partly as an insult. The Gagauz themselves did not use this self-designation; indeed, they considered it offensive. Both Pees and Jireček mention that the Gagauz in Bulgaria tended to register either as Greek because of their religion (clearly an outcome of the Ottoman millet-system) or as Bulgarian because of the newly emerging concept of nationalism. According to Pees informants from Moldova, the Gagauz there called themselves Hristiyan-Bulgar (Christian Bulgar), and Gagauz was used only as a nickname (Pees 1894, p. 90). The etymology of the ethnonym Gagauz is as unclear as their history. As noted above, they are not mentioned—at least not under that name—in any historical sources before their immigration into Bessarabia. Therefore, we have no older versions of this ethnonym. This, combined with the report that the Gagauz felt offended when called by this name, makes the etymology somewhat dubious.

== Geographical distribution ==
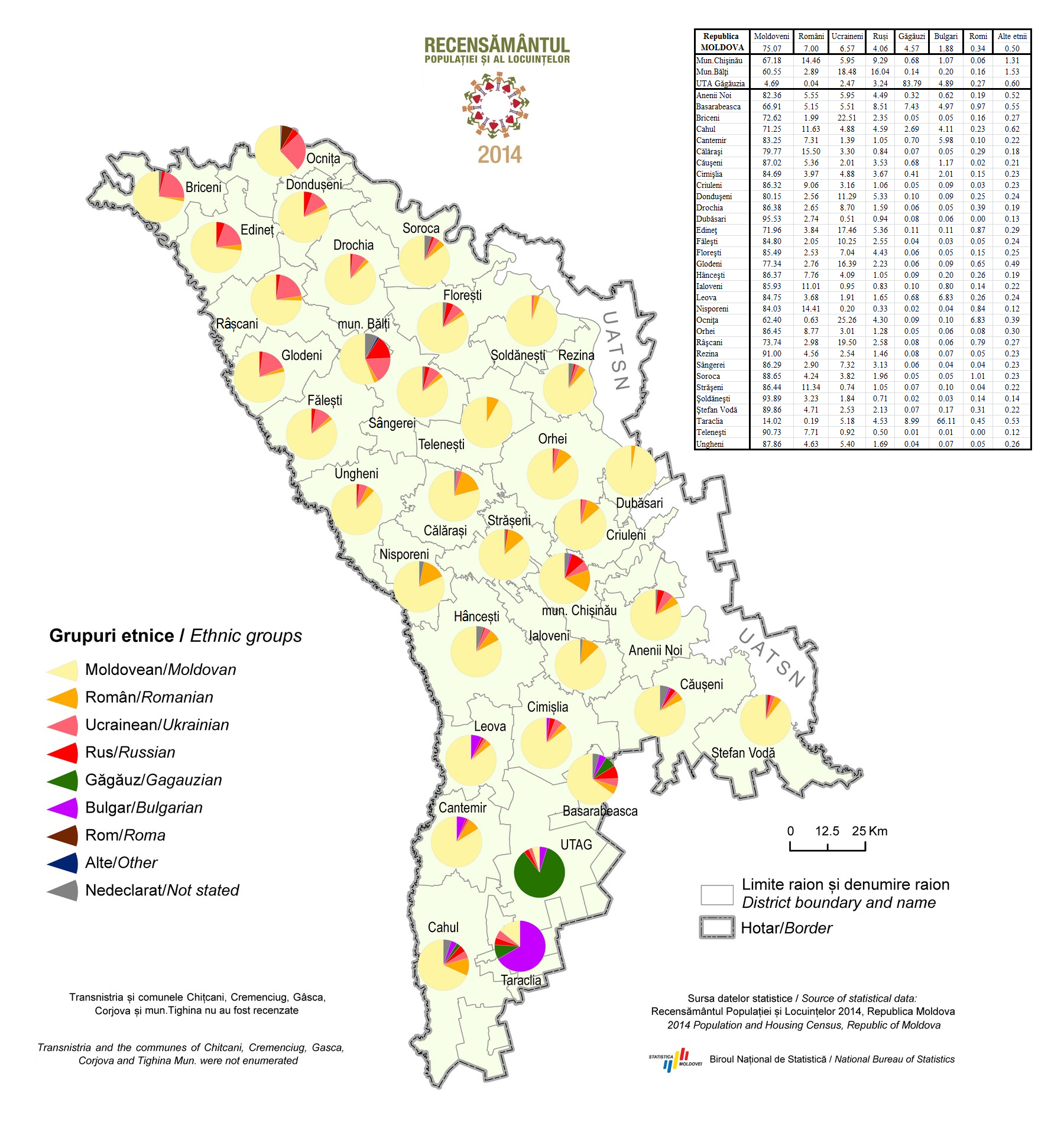
A map of the major ethnic groups in Moldova (2014) with Gagauz in green

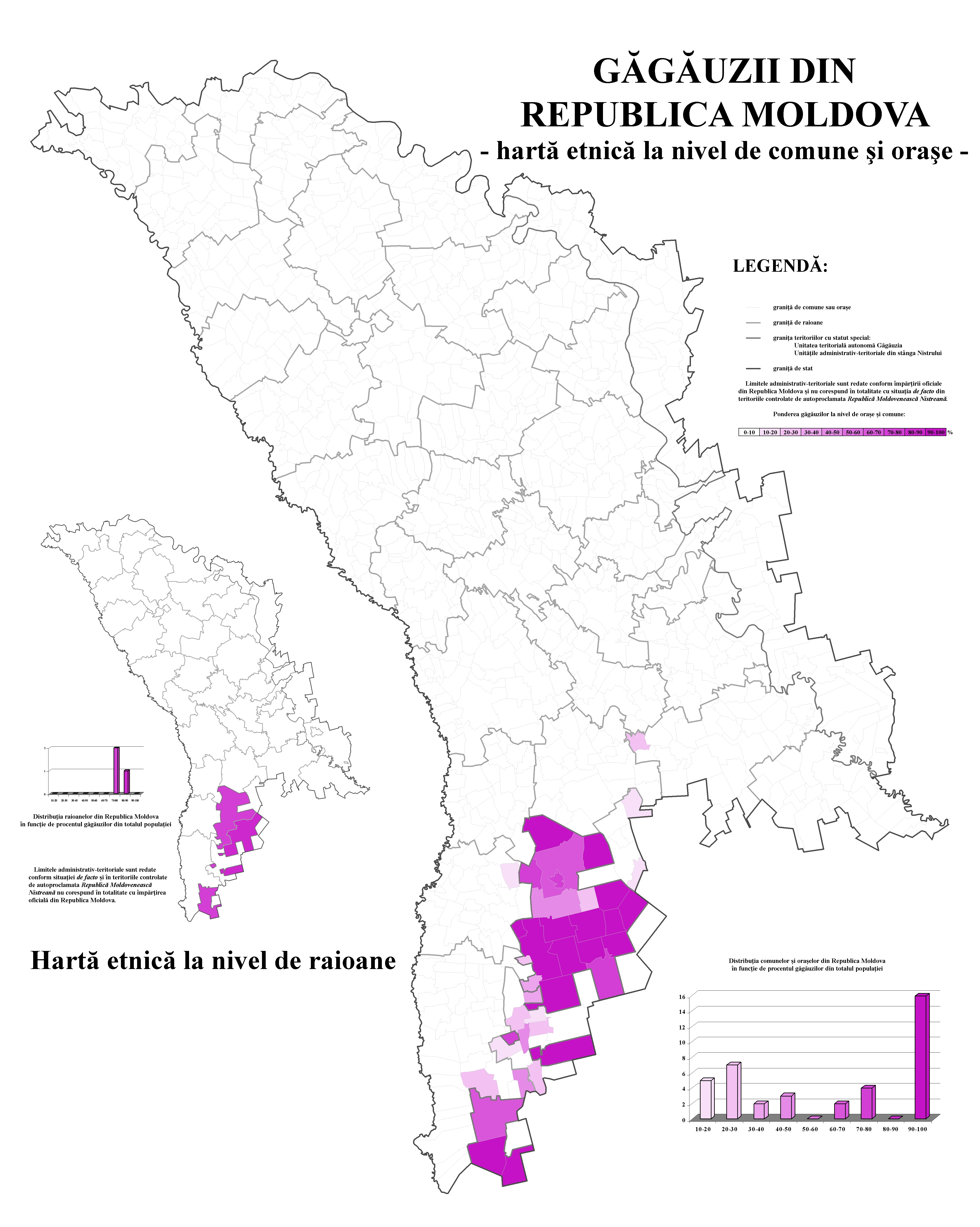
A map of the distribution of Gagauz in Moldova

Outside Moldova, a minority of Gagauz people live in the Ukrainian regions of Odesa and Zaporizhzhia. They are also in Kazakhstan, Kyrgyzstan, Uzbekistan, Bulgaria, Greece, Romania, Brazil, Turkmenistan, Belarus, Estonia, Latvia, Georgia, Turkey, and the Russian region of Kabardino-Balkaria.

The Gagauz people are one of the largest ethnic minorities in Moldova. During the Russian colonization of southern Bessarabia (Budjak), in the early 19th century, the Gagauz people moved from the eastern Balkans, beginning to stabilize their presence on the future territory of the Republic of Moldova. The Gagauz are not equally distributed on the territory of Moldova, living primarily in the southern part of the country, particularly in the Autonomous Territorial Unit of Gagauzia. They follow a primarily rural lifestyle.

The Gagauz are the third minority ethnic group in the Republic of Moldova, counting 126,010 people according to the 2014 census, i.e. 4.57% of the total population (without Transnistria). Their share in the ethnic composition of the country is gradually increasing. They are the majority of Gagauzia's population (83.8%), while in Taraclia District, which is inhabited primarily by Bulgarians, they comprise 9.0% of the total population. In Basarabeasca District they are 7.4% of the district's population, but gradually declining. In Cahul district, they have a small presence (2.7% of the district's population). In the rest of Moldova their share is lower than 1%. The internal migration of Gagauz in Moldova is low. Most Gagauz who leave Gagauzia migrate to Russia.

Due to their concentration in the areas around the border between Moldova and Ukraine, modern Gagauz people marry primarily with other Gagauz; thus keeping a high degree of ethnic stability. However, in the recent past, the situation was somewhat different. In the early 20th century, the ratio of Gagauz and Bulgarians in the population of Comrat was approximately 2:1. In the late 20th century, due to assimilation and higher fertility rates within the Gagauz, the ratio was 1:14. Nowadays, similar ratios between Gagauz and Bulgarians are preserved in some villages. For practical reasons, a contemporary Gagauz usually speaks at least two languages. In their daily life they use Gagauz and Russian, but many can speak Romanian as well.

== History ==
=== Origins ===
The origin of the Gagauz is obscure. In the beginning of the 20th century, a Bulgarian historian counted 19 different theories about their origin. A few decades later the Gagauz ethnologist M. N. Guboglo increased the number to 21. In some of those theories the Gagauz people are presented as descendants of the Pechenegs, the Cumans-Kipchaks or a clan of Seljuks or a mix of all. Others doubt altogether that the Gagauz are of Turkic origin at all and claimed that they are of Turkified Bulgarian or Greek origin. The fact that their religion is Eastern Orthodox Christianity may suggest that their ancestors already lived in the Balkans before the Ottoman conquest in the late 14th century.

==== Seljuk hypothesis ====
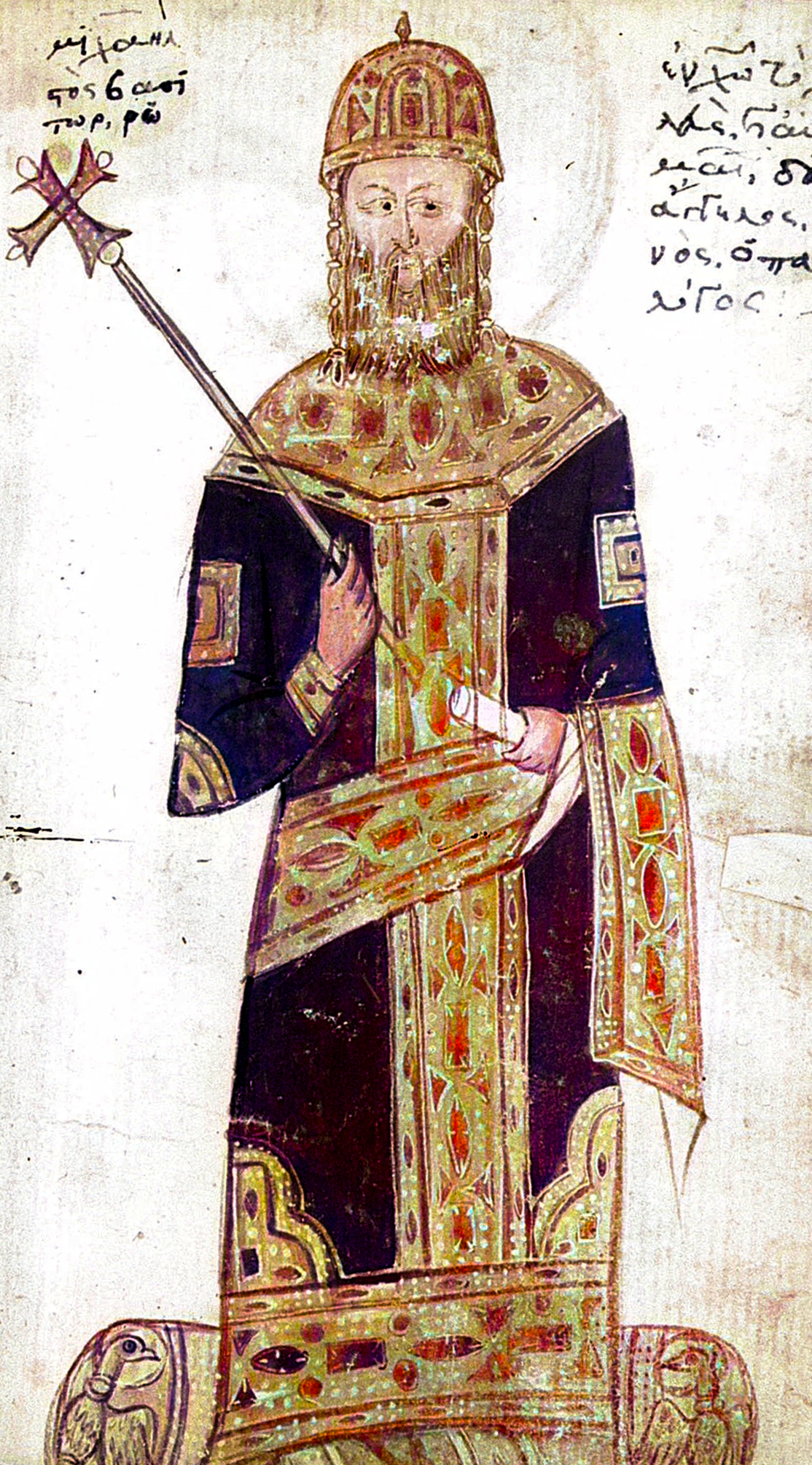
Miniature depicting Byzantine Emperor Michael VIII Palaiologos

After the defeat of the Sultan of Rum Kaykaus II at the Battle of Sivirhisar by the Ilkhanids, his family, court and many loyalist Turkomans fled with him to Byzantine Constantinople in summer 1262, and were subsequently welcomed by Emperor Michael VIII Palaiologos.

According to later Ottoman tradition, as expressed in the 15th-century Selçukname narrative, the Sufi Sarı Saltık accompanied the sultan to Constantinople. He led a group of Turkomans that were settled by Michael VIII Palaiologos in Dobruja, in order to protect the northern frontier of the Byzantine Empire. However, Dobruja was occupied by Tatars around the same period. The same source places him in Crimea after 1265, amongst the Turkomans transferred there by Berke, khaghan of the Golden Horde, and after 1280 mentions him leading the nomads back to Dobruja. According to ethnologist Anatolie F. Bajora, this event was a myth brought into Dobruja by the Tatars and not a true historical event. The Seljuk theory has been criticized because archaeologically no "secular and compact" presence of Seljuks has been confirmed. According to researcher Rustam Shukurov:

The most detailed account of the migration of nomadic Turks to Byzantium can be found in a few controversial passages from Yazıcızâde ‘Alī’s "Tawārīkh-i Āl-i Saljūq". In summary, the accounts of Yazıcızâde ‘Alī can be understood in the sense that Michael Palaiologos authorized a fairly large-scale emigration of nomadic Turks, partisans of ‘Izz al-Dīn, from Anatolia to the European part of the Byzantine empire. It seems plausible that the main bulk of the Turkish nomads was settled by the Byzantine authorities in Southern Dobruja. The spiritual leader of the Turks of Dobruja was Sarı Saltık. The warriors of these nomadic groups participated in some victorious wars on the side of the emperor, in particular, one may think, during the reconquest of Dobruja in the name of Michael VIII Palaiologos. The later Ottoman historian Lokmân adds that the nomadic resettlement in Dobruja happened in 662 H. (4 November 1263-23 October 1264) [...] it is possible that the leading administrative role among the Dobrujan Turks belonged to the sultan’s maternal uncle Kyr Khāya and not to the mystic saint Sarı Saltık.

==== Steppe hypothesis ====
The Steppe hypothesis suggests that the Gagauz may be descendants of other Turkic nomadic tribes than Seljuks: Bulgars and Cumans-Kipchaks from the Eurasian steppes. In the 19th century, before their migration to Bessarabia, the Gagauz from the Bulgarian territories of the Ottoman Empire considered themselves Bulgarians. Ethnological research suggests "Gagauz" was a linguistic distinction and not ethnic. The Gagauz at that time called themselves "Hasli Bulgar" (True Bulgarians) or "Eski Bulgar" (Old Bulgarians) and considered the term Gagauz to be demeaning when applied to them by the Slavic-speaking Bulgarians.

The Gagauz called their language "Turkish" and claimed descent from then-Turkic-speaking Bulgars who in the 7th century established the First Bulgarian Empire on the Danube. Indeed, one modern Gagauz surname is Qipcakli. The Russian Empire Census of 1897 did not distinguish the Gagauz as a specific group, but it reported the existence of 55,790 native speakers of a "Turkish language" (presumably the Gagauz language) in the Bessarabia Governorate. According to historian A.F. Bajora, although this theory has many convincing arguments, the main counter-argument to this theory is that the Cuman language and the Gagauz language were languages belonging to different branches of Turkic.

==== Greek hypothesis ====
According to a version of this hypothesis, the Gagauz immigrated to the Balkans from Anatolia and, while they kept their Greek Orthodox religion, they were linguistically assimilated (Turkified). According to another version, the Ottomans found a native Greek population in Dobruja in the 14th century and, due to their population being lower than the number of Turkish settlers, this Greek population, too, kept their Greek Orthodox religion but got linguistically assimilated (Turkified). In this vein of linguistic assimilation, the Gagauz have been compared to the Karamanlides.

An argument that favors the Greek hypothesis is given by genetic research, which shows that the Gagauz are genetically European. During the Greek War of Independence the Gagauz in Bessarabia and Bulgaria enlisted in the armies of Alexander Ypsilantis and fought for the Greek side in the war. The Greek hypothesis was favored most notably by Konstantin Jireček, among others.

==== Bulgarian hypothesis ====
Bulgarian sources argue that the Gagauz are Turkified Bulgarians because most of the Gagauz people in Bulgaria consider themselves natives ("Erli") meaning real natives. According to this theory, the Gagauz are either direct descendants of the Medieval Turkic Bulgars, or of Slavic Bulgarian origin, being no different than the rest of the Bulgarians, before the Turkic language spread among them. According to A.F. Bajora this theory has many strong arguments, but states that the fact that Ottoman Turks did not force their subjects to accept their language and only compelled them to convert to Islam, and that not all Gagauz in Bulgaria consider themselves Bulgarians, are strong counter-arguments.

=== Modern history ===
Between 1820 and 1846, the Russian Empire allocated land to the Gagauz and gave them financial incentives to settle in Bessarabia in the settlements vacated by the Nogai tribes. They settled in Bessarabia along with Bassarabian Bulgarians, mainly in Avdarma, Comrat (or Komrat), Congaz (Kongaz), Tomai, Cișmichioi and other former Nogai villages located in the central Budjak region. Originally, the Gagauz also settled in several villages belonging to boyars throughout southern Bessarabia and the Principality of Moldavia, but soon moved to join their kin in the Bugeac. Until 1869, the Gagauz in Bessarabia were described as Bulgarians. During the Romanian rule of southernmost Bessarabia (1856–1878), they supported Bulgarian schools in their settlements and participated in the Bulgarian national movement. Therefore, some ethnologists (Karel Škorpil, Gavril Zanetov (himself a Gagauz), Benyo Tsonev) claim Bulgarian origin for the Gagauz.

In the 1860s, some Gagauz resettled to the vicinity of Berdiansk on the Sea of Azov coast, and in 1908–1914 to Central Asia.

With the exception of a six-day independence in the winter of 1906, when a peasant uprising declared the autonomous Comrat Republic, the Gagauz people have mainly been ruled by the Russian Empire, Romania, the Soviet Union, and Moldova.

The wave of Stolypin agrarian policies carried some Gagauz to Kazakhstan between 1912 and 1914, and later yet another group settled in Uzbekistan during the very troubled years of initial collectivization. So as not to lose their civil rights, they called themselves Bulgarians in the 1930s; the Gagauz of the village of Mayslerge in the Tashkent District retain that designation to this day.

In 1970 the total population of the Gagauz reached 156,600 in the USSR (26,400 of them lived in the Ukrainian SSR and 125,000 in the Moldavian SSR). In 1979, about 173,000 Gagauz lived in the USSR.

Gagauz nationalism remained an intellectual movement during the 1980s but strengthened by the end of the decade as both elites and opposition groups in the Soviet Union began to embrace nationalist ideals. In 1988, activists from the local intelligentsia aligned with other ethnic minorities to create the movement known as the "Gagauz People" (Gagauz: Gagauz halkı). A year later, the "Gagauz People" held its first assembly which accepted the resolution to create an autonomous territory in the southern Moldavian SSR, with Comrat designated as capital. The Gagauz nationalist movement increased in popularity when Moldovan was accepted as the official language of the Republic of Moldova in August 1989. In November 1989, the Gagauz ASSR within Moldova was declared.

=== Gagauz nationalism in independent Moldova ===
In August 1990, Comrat declared itself as the Gagauz Republic, an autonomous Soviet republic separate from the Moldavian SSR, but the Moldovan government annulled the declaration as unconstitutional. The Gagauz were also worried about the implications for them if Moldova reunited with Romania, as seemed increasingly likely. Support for the Soviet Union remained high, with a local referendum in March 1991 yielding an almost unanimous "yes" vote to stay in the USSR; Moldovans in Gagauzia, however, boycotted the referendum. Many Gagauz supported the Moscow coup attempt, further straining relations with Chişinău. However, when the Moldovan parliament voted on whether Moldova should become independent, six of the twelve Gagauz deputies voted in favor. Following the dissolution of the Soviet Union, Gagauzia became a de facto independent state.

Flag of Gagauzia

In February 1994, President Mircea Snegur, opposed to Gagauz independence, promised a Gagauz autonomous region. Snegur also opposed the suggestion that Moldova become a federal state made up of three "republics": Moldova, Gagauzia, and Transnistria. In 1994, the Moldovan parliament awarded "the people of Gagauzia" the right of "external self-determination" should the status of the country change. This means that in the event that Moldova decided to join another country (by all accounts this referred to Romania), the Gagauz would be entitled to decide whether to remain or not a part of the new state by means of a self-determination referendum.

As a result of a referendum to determine Gagauzia's borders, thirty settlements (three towns and twenty-seven villages) expressed their desire to be included in the Gagauz Autonomous Territorial Unit. In 1995, Gheorghe Tabunșcic was elected to serve as the Governor (Bashkan) of Gagauzia for a four-year term, as were the deputies of the local parliament, "The People's Assembly" (Halk Topluşu) and its chairman Petru Pașalî.

The prospects for the survival of the Gagauz national culture and the existence of the Gagauz as an independent people are tenuous. They have the lowest ratio of persons with a higher education in Moldova, a virtual absence of an artistic intelligentsia, a very weak scientific intelligentsia, and an acute lack of intellectuals in general. In 1989 less than half as many Gagauz were admitted to the state university and the polytechnical institute as in 1918. Accordingly, the Gagauz are weakly represented in administration, the professions, and the service industries. There is an acute shortage of building materials, and the environment is in a state of crisis. Analysis of this situation led to the Gagauz movement for national regeneration. On 12 November 1989 an extraordinary session of representatives to the Moldavian Supreme Soviet adopted a resolution calling for the establishment of a Gagauz ASSR within the Moldavian SSR. Three days later, however, the presidium of the Moldavian Supreme Soviet failed to confirm this decision, thus trampling on the principle of national self-determination of the Communist party of the Soviet Union. Moreover, the Moldavian press opened a campaign of anti-Gagauz propaganda. Despite a series of declarations about a renaissance of the Gagauz, the absence of the necessary conditions, including national-territorial autonomy, will make their realization difficult, and the people appear doomed to assimilation.

== Genetic studies ==
In DNA comparisons, the Gagauz were found to be more closely related genetically to neighboring southeastern European groups than to linguistically related Anatolian populations. More considerable distinctions in the distribution of Y chromosome components appeared between the Gagauz and other Turkic peoples.

The similarity to neighboring populations may be due to the lack of social barriers between the local and the Turkic-Orthodox populations of the Balkan Peninsula. Another possibility is language shift in accordance with the dominant minority model, i.e. Turkification.

Gagauz belong to Y-DNA haplogroups I2a (23.6%), R1a (19.1%), G (13.5%), R1b (12.4%), E1b1b1a1 (11.1%), J2 (5.6%) and Haplogroup N (2.2%). Finally, the phylogenetic analysis of Y-DNA situates Gagauz most proximal to Bulgarians, Macedonians, Romanians, Serbs and other Balkan populations, resulting in a high genetic distance from the Turkish people and other Turkic peoples. The analyses showed that Gagauz belong to the Balkan populations, suggesting that the Gagauz language represents a case of language replacement in southeastern Europe. According to a more detailed autosomal analysis of thousands of SNPs, not just of the sex chromosome, Gagauz are most proximal to ethnic Macedonians, followed by Greek Macedonians apart from Thessaloniki, and others such as Bulgarians, Romanians and Montenegrins.

After a genetic comparison between the populations of the Balkans, Anatolia, and Central Asia, the results showed that the Gagauz are part of the Balkan genetic group.

== Language ==
The Gagauz language belongs to the Oghuz branch of the Turkic languages, which also includes the Azerbaijani, Turkish, and Turkmen languages. The Gagauz language is particularly close to the Balkan Turkish dialects spoken in Greece, northeastern Bulgaria, and in the Kumanovo and Bitola areas of North Macedonia. The Balkan Turkic languages, including Gagauz, are a typologically interesting case, because they are closely related to Turkish and at the same time contain a North-Turkic (Tatar or Kypchak) element besides the main South-Turkic (Oghuz) element (Pokrovskaya, 1964). The modern Gagauz language has two dialects: central (or "Bulgar") and southern (or maritime).

== Culture ==
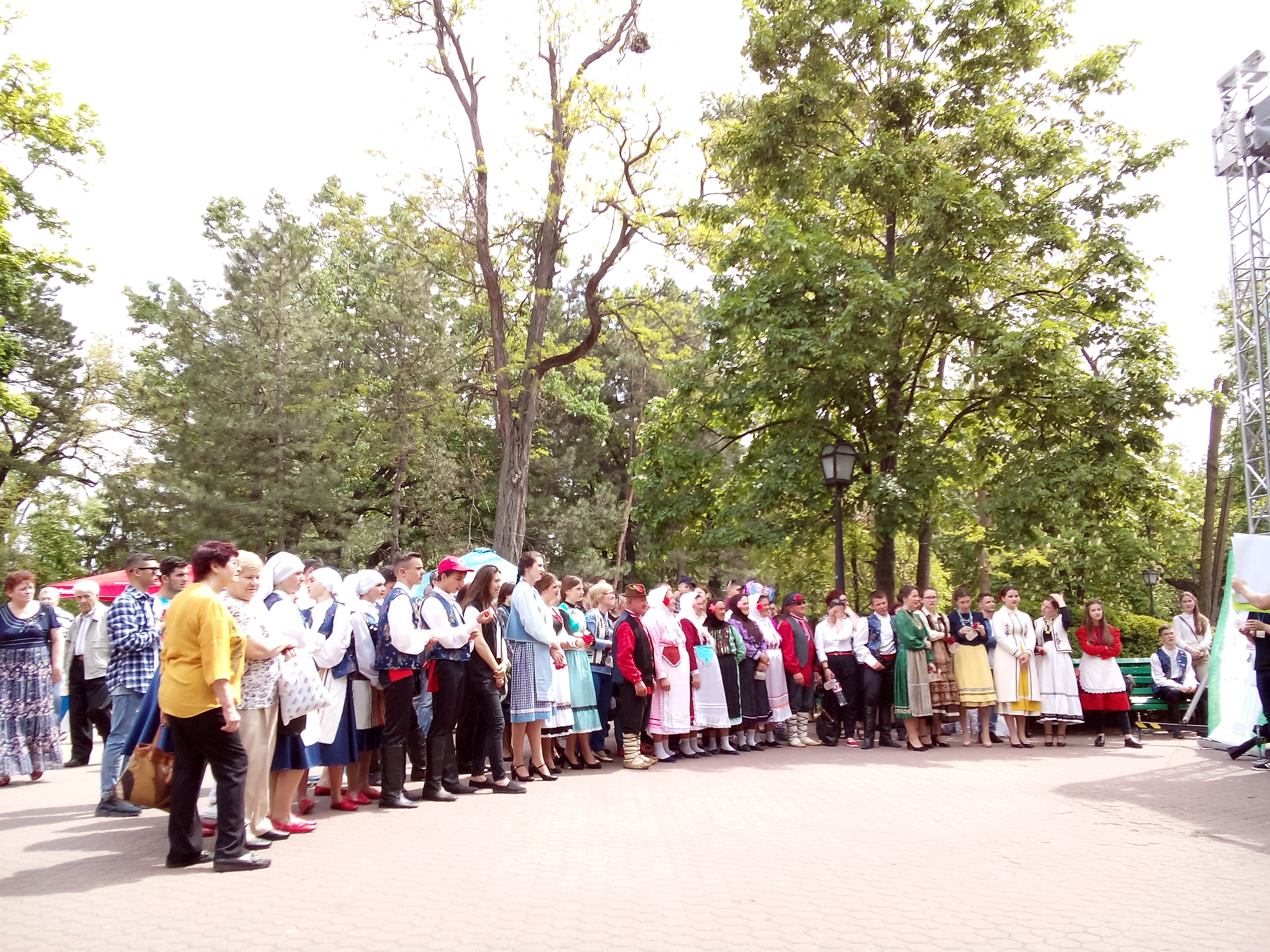
The Gagauz community of Chișinău celebrates Ederlezi

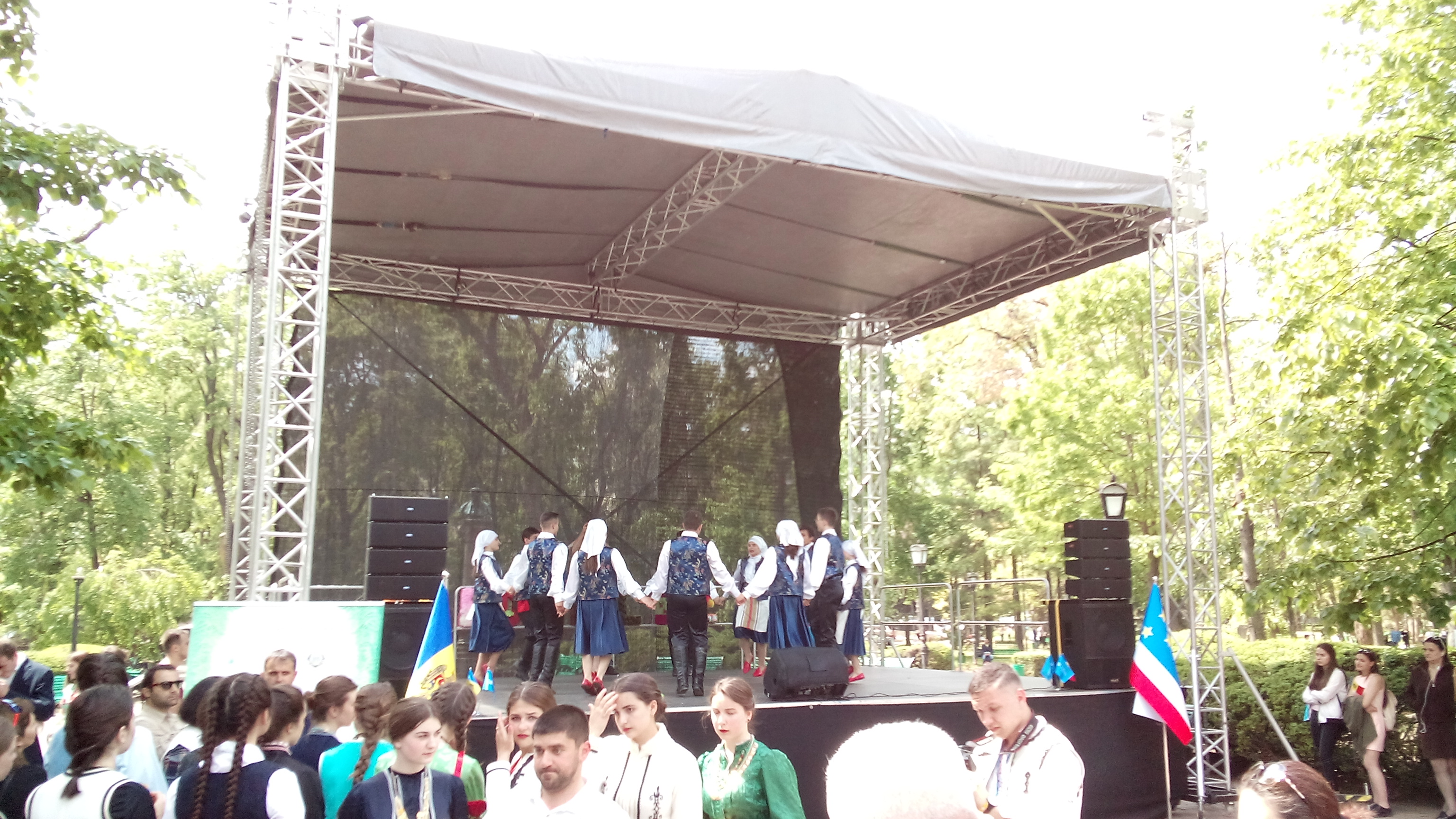
Gagauz people in Chișinău, celebrating Hıdırellez in May 2017

=== Music ===
In 2013, Ludmila Tukan was selected to represent Gagauzia in the territory's debut at the Turkvision Song Contest, with the song Вернись любовь ("Come back love").

=== Economy ===
The traditional economy centered on animal husbandry (particularly sheep raising) and agriculture that combined grain and market gardening with viticulture. Even in the recent past, despite the cultural similarity of the Gagauz to the Bulgarians of Bessarabia, there were important differences between them: the Bulgarians were peasant farmers; although the Gagauz also farmed, they were essentially pastoralist in outlook.

=== Religion ===
The vast majority of Gagauz are Eastern Orthodox Christians. In Turkey the Muslim Gagauz are called Gajal.

There have been a number of attempts from the 1930s into the 21st century to tie the Turkish Orthodox Patriarchate with the ethnically Turkic, Greek Orthodox Gagauz minority in Bessarabia.

=== Marriages ===
For a long time, the Gagauz people of Moldova were characterized by a predominance of mono-ethnic marriages: out of 100 marriages concluded in 1970, 73 were mono-ethnic, and out of 100 marriages concluded in 2003, 77 were so. In 2003, Gagauz men of Moldova more often married women of their own nationality (78%), less often with Moldovan women (9%), Bulgarian women (5%), Russian women (4%), and Ukrainian women (3%). For Gagauz women of Moldova in 2003, these figures were respectively: 75%, 8%, 5%, 4%, and 5%. In contrast, the Gagauz of Chisinau are characterized by predominantly mixed-ethnic marriages, which in 2000 accounted for 97% of all marriages between Gagauz of both sexes. As of 2018, the number of monoethnic marriages has decreased.

=== Names ===
The Gagauz name consists of a personal name, patronymic and surname. The most recognizable form of a name usually consists of a given name and a surname. Such a system was established among the Gagauz in the second half of the 20th century. Modern personal Gagauz names belong to different eras that also popular among the other Orthodox Christian communities. A large part of them is of Greek origin (Лія - Lia, Анатолій - Anatoly, Александр - Alexander, Ірина - Irina, Варвара - Varvara), of Hebrew origin (Марія - Maria, Семен - Semyon, Анна - Anna, Іванна - Ivanna, etc.), of Romance origin (Домна - Domna, Константин - Constantine). Sometimes they can also be of Slavic origin (Віра - Vira, Володимир - Vladimir) and of Bulgarian origin (Марин - Marin). Recently, the Gagauz have been increasingly borrowing foreign names.

The name of the child is given in two ways:

- named after grandparents
- by the name of godparents

Gagauz surnames are of Turkish origin for example known Gagauz historical figures such as Mihail Çakır (meaning: blue, vine), Nikolay Petroviç Arabacı (meaning: coachman), Dimitri Karaçoban (meaning: black or brunette shepherd). In addition, surnames come from professions, street nicknames, and the father's name. When concluding a civil marriage, women take the surname of their spouse.

=== Food ===
The staple food of Gagauz cuisine is grain, in many varieties. A series of family holidays and rituals was connected with the baking of wheat bread, both leavened loaves (e.g., kalaches) and unleavened flatcakes.

The favorite dish was a layered pie stuffed with sheep's milk cheese and soaked with sour cream before baking. Other delicacies were pies with crumbled pumpkin and sweet pies made with the first milk of a cow that had just calved. The traditional ritual dish called kurban combined bulgar wheat porridge with a slaughtered (or sacrificed) ram and is further evidence of the origins of the Gagauz in both the Balkan world and the steppe-pastoral complex. Peppered meat sauces are especially important: one combines onion and finely granulated porridge, while another is tomato-based. A red house wine is served with dinner and supper. Head cheese is an indispensable component of holiday meals.

=== Clothing ===
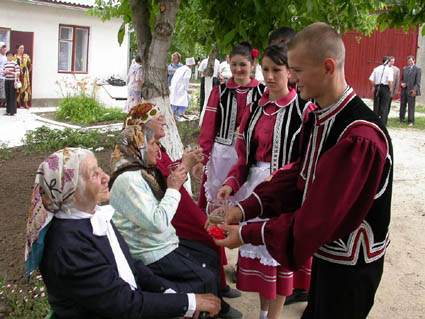
Young and old Gagauz people

==== Women's ====
Toward the end of the 19th century, in good weather, a Gagauz woman's costume consisted of a canvas shirt, a sleeveless dress, a smock, and a large black kerchief. In winter, they donned a dress with sleeves, a cloth jacket, and a sleeveless fur coat. Required features of female dress were earrings, bracelets, beads, and, among wealthy Gagauz, a necklace of gold coins. "So many of their decorations are hung about," wrote a pre-Revolutionary researcher, "that they cover the entire breast down to the waist."

==== Men's ====
Traditional male clothing included a shirt, cloth pants, a wide red sash or belt, and a hat. The winter cap was made of Karakul sheep wool. The shepherd's costume was the usual shirt combined with sheepskin pants with the fleece turned in, a sleeveless fur coat, and a short sheepskin jacket, the latter sometimes decorated with red-on-green stitching.

== Ukrainian Gagauz ==
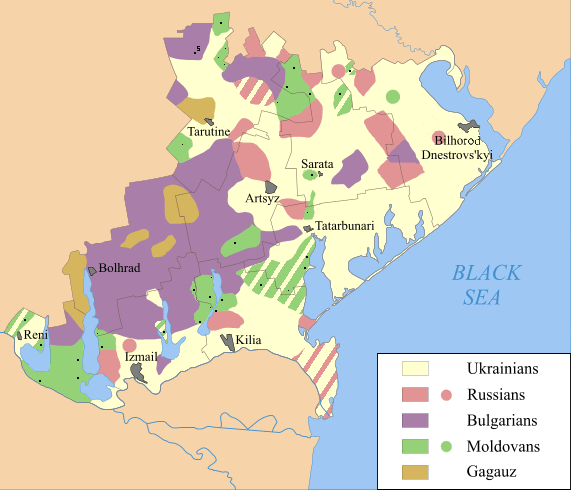
Ethnic map of Budjak, a Ukrainian territory where Gagauz people live

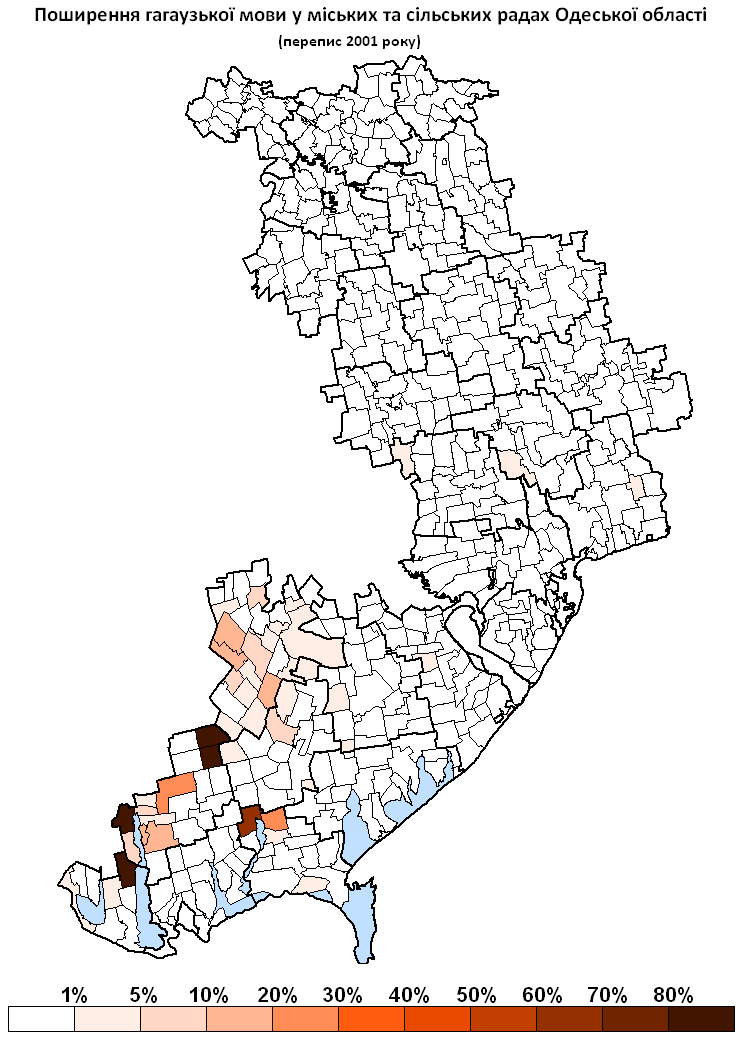
Distribution of the Gagauz language in the Odesa Oblast according to the 2001 census

Since 1991, the Gagauz nation became a trans-border nation located in Budjak and divided between Moldova and Ukraine. In Ukraine, they form a minority and mainly live near the Bessarabian Bulgarians community around the city of Bolhrad. In the 2001 Ukrainian census, the Gagauz population accounted for 31,923 people, with 27,617 (86.51%) of them living in the Budjak area of the Bessarabian region of Odesa Oblast, primarily in and around the cities of Izmail, Reni, and Kiliya, as well as the Bolhrad Raion (district).

In the Odesa region, the Gagauz make up 1.1% of the region's population. The number of Gagauz in the period between the 1989 and 2001 censuses increased by 0.9%, and the share of residents of the region - by 0.1%. A notable Ukrainian Gagauz is Mykola Palas (born 1980), who served as a colonel during the Russo-Ukrainian War and is a recipient of the Hero of Ukraine award.

=== Distribution ===
Regions of Ukraine by the number of Gagauz in 2001:

Region	Quantity
Odesa oblast	27617
Mykolaiv oblast	877
Donetsk oblast	494
Crimea	387
Dnipropetrovsk oblast	365
Luhansk oblast	275
Zaporizhzhia oblast	268
Kherson oblast	239
Kharkiv oblast	205
Other regions	1196
All	31923

Gagauz live in the south and southwest of Odesa region in Bolhrad (18.7%), Reni (7.9%), Bessarabske (6.0%), Kiliia (3.8%), and Artsyz (1.8%) areas. The number of Gagauz increased in Ivanivka (+100.0%), Ovidiopol (+100.0%), Bolhrad (+0.7%) districts and the city of Izmail (+14.3%), slightly decreased in Kiliia (−14.8%), Artsyz (−10.0%), Bessarabske (−6.9%), and Reni (−5.9%) districts.

The Gagauz also traditionally lived in the south of the Zaporizhzhia region, where they moved from Budzhak with Bulgarians and Albanians after the Crimean War. There the Gagauz population was present in the villages of Dmytrivka, Oleksandrivka, Kotlovyna, Vynohradivka, and Stari Troyany.

=== Language ===
The majority of Gagauz (71%) consider Gagauz their mother tongue, a significant proportion (23%) consider Russian their mother tongue.

Native language of Gagauz of Ukraine according to population censuses:

Language	1970	%	1989	%	2001	%
Gagauz	23 564	89.0	25 401	79.5	22 822	71.5
Russian	2 171	8.2	5 478	17.1	7 232	22.7
Ukrainian	155	0.6	450	1.4	1 102	3.5
Other	574	2.2	638	2.0	496	1.6

== Notable people ==
Chronologically by birth year.

- Alexandru Averescu (1859–1938), Marshal of Romania and former Prime Minister of Romania, partial Gagauz descent
- Mihail Ciachir (1861–1938), Orthodox priest and Gagauz educator, historian and ethnographist
- Gavril Zanetov (1874–1934), Bulgarian lawyer, historian, publicist and literary critic
- Dumitru Topciu (1888–1958), Romanian politician and agriculturalist
- Anton Novakov (?–1938), industrialist and legislator of the short-lived Moldavian Democratic Republic (1917–1918)
- Vladimir Cavarnali (1910–1966), Romanian poet, journalist, editor, and political figure
- Stepan Topal (1938–2018), Moldovan politician
- Zinovia Dushkova (born 1953), Russian author, poet, philosopher, and historian
- Alexandr Stoianoglo (born 1967), Moldovan former prosecutor and politician
- Igor Radulov (born 1982), Russian former professional ice hockey player
- Alexander Radulov (born 1986), Russian professional ice hockey player
- Xenia Deli (born 1989), Moldovan-American model
- Vladislav Baboglo (born 1998), Moldovan-Ukrainian footballer

== See also ==
- Gagauzia
- Gagauz language
- Gagauz Halkı
- Transnistria War
- Gagauz people in Moldova
- Uzes
- Gagauz World Congress
- Demographics of Moldova
- Bessarabian Bulgarians
- Turkic Christians

== Bibliography ==
- Vanya Mateeva, 2006 Sofia, "Гагаузите - още един поглед" ["The Gagauz - yet another view"]
- Dimitris Michalopoulos, "The Metropolitan of the Gagauz: Ambassador Tanrıöver and the problem of Romania's Christian Orthodox Turks", Turkey & Romania. A history of partnership and collaboration in the Balkans, Istanbul: Union of Turkish World Municipalities and Istanbul University, 2016, p. 567-572. ISBN 978-605-65863-3-0
- Shabashov A. V., 2002, Odesa, Astroprint, "Gagauz: terms of kinship system and origin of the people", (Шабашов А. В., "Гагаузы: система терминов родства и происхождение народа")
- Shukurov, Rustam (2014). "Sultan 'Izz al-Dīn Kaykāwus II in Byzantium (1262-1264/1265)". Der Doppeladler. Byzanz und die Seldschuken in Anatolien vom späten 11. bis zum 13. Jahrhundert. Verlag des Römisch-Germanischen Zentralmuseums. ISBN 978-3-88467-235-8.
- Mikhail Guboglo, 1967, "Этническая принадлежност гагаузов". Советская этнография, No 3 [Ethnic identity of the Gagauz. Soviet ethnography journal, Issue No 3.]
- Dmitriev N. K., 1962, Moscow, Science, "Structure of Türkic languages", articles "About lexicon of Gagauz language", "Gagauz etudes", "Phonetics of Gagauz language", (Дмитриев Н.К., "Структура Тюткских Языков", статьи "К вопросу о словарном составе гагаузского языка", "Гагаузские этюды", "Фонетика гагаузского языка")
- Mihail Çakır, 1934, Basarabyalı Gagavuzların İstoryası ["History of the Gagauz people of Bessarabia"]
- Kowalski, T., 1933 Kraków, "Les Turcs et la langue turque de la Bulgarie du Nord-Est". ["The Turks and the Turkic language of North-Eastern Bulgaria"]
- Škorpil, K. and H., 1933 Praha, "Материали към въпроса за съдбата на прабългарите и на северите и към въпроса за произхода на съвременните гагаузи". Byzantinoslavica, T.5
