= Horodnie rural hromada =

Coordinates: 45°53′N 28°51′E

Horodnie rural hromada Городненська сільська громада
- Hromada
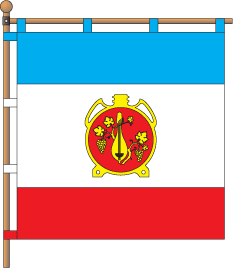
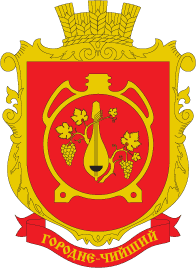
- Flag Coat of arms
- Interactive map of Horodnie rural hromada
- Country: Ukraine
- Oblast: Odesa Oblast
- Raion: Bolhrad Raion
- Admin. center: Horodnie

Area
  - Total: 297.5 km^{2} (114.9 sq mi)

Population (2020)
  - Total: 14,931
  - Density: 50.19/km^{2} (130.0/sq mi)
- CATOTTG code: UA51060090000014997
- Settlements: 4
- Villages: 4

Horodnie rural hromada (Ukrainian: Городненська сільська громада) is a hromada in Bolhrad Raion of Odesa Oblast in southwestern Ukraine. Population: 14,931 (2020 est.)

The hromada consists of 4 villages:

- Horodnie (seat of administration)
- Dmytrivka
- Novi Troiany
- Oleksandrivka

== Links ==
- Городненська сільська громада
