= Gavril Zanetov =

Bulgarian lawyer and historian

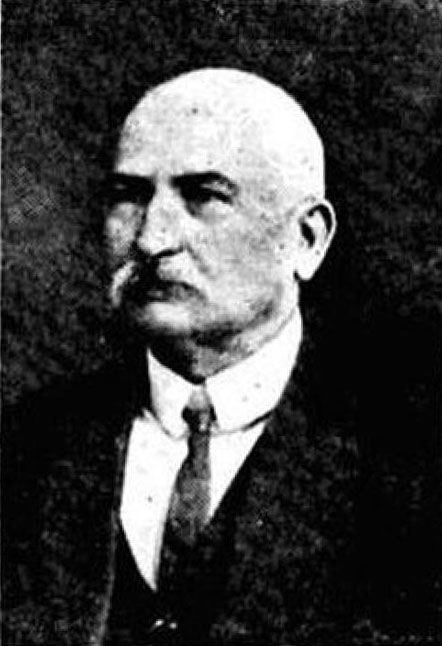
- Born: 4 October 1874; Congaz, United Principalities of Moldavia and Wallachia
- Died: 24 February 1934 (aged 70–71); Sofia, Bulgaria
- Occupation(s): Bulgarian lawyer, historian, publicist, literary critic

Gavril Tanasov Zanetov (Bulgarian: Гаврил Танасов Занетов) was a Bulgarian lawyer, historian, publicist and literary critic of Gagauz descent. He was a close associate and adviser to Prime Minister Vasil Radoslavov.

He graduated from the Bolhrad High School of Law and Law at the University of Odessa. He worked as a magistrate at the Court of Appeal in Sofia.

Zanetov was author of a number of books, studios and publications on historical and ethnographic issues. He contributed to most Bulgarian periodicals from the late 19th century and early 20th century. He was committed to the cause of the Bulgarian origin of the population along the Velika Morava river valley and supported the theory that the Gagauz people were of Bulgarian origin.
