= Bumbăta =

- Village
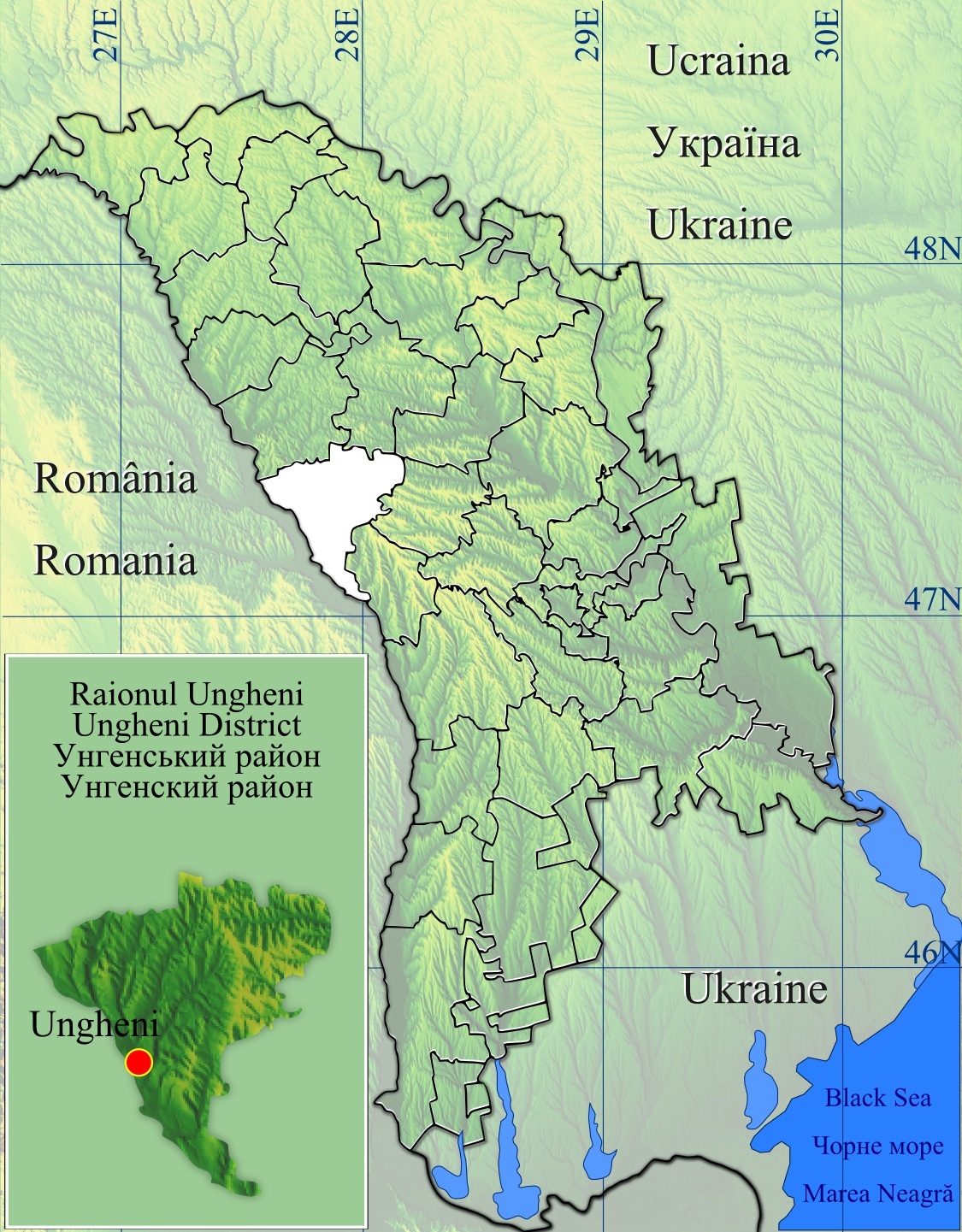
- Location within Ungheni
- Coordinates: 47°20′29″N 27°58′11″E
- Country: Moldova

Government
  - Mayor: Dumitru Paladi (PL)

Population (2014 census)
  - Total: 2,107
- Time zone: UTC+2 (EET)
  - Summer (DST): UTC+3 (EEST)
- Postal code: MD-3615

Bumbăta is a village in Ungheni District, Moldova.
