= Bolgarka =

Bolgarka Болгарка Болгарка بولگاركا
- Location within Kazakhstan
- Coordinates: 49°38′56″N 56°31′48″E
- Country: Kazakhstan
- Region: Aktobe
- District: Alga District
- Elevation: 241 m (791 ft)
- Time zone: UTC+5 (West Kazakhstan Time)
  - Summer (DST): UTC+5 (West Kazakhstan Time)

Bolgarka (Kazakh: Болгарка, Bolgarka, بولگاركا; Russian: Болгарка, Bolgarka) is a selo in Alga District, Aktobe Region, west Kazakhstan. It lies at an altitude of 241 m (791 ft). Population: 480 (2009 census results); 922 (1999 census results).

It was founded in 1905 by settlers from Bessarabia belonging to the Gagauz, Bulgarian, and Romanian communities.
