= Balkan Turkish language =

Oghuz Turkic language of the Balkans

Balkan Gagauz Turkish
- Balkan Gagauz, Balkan Turkish, Rumelian Turkish
- Balkan Türkçesi, Rumeli Türkçesi
- Native to: Turkey, Greece, Bulgaria, North Macedonia, Serbia, Kosovo
- Region: Balkan Peninsula
- Ethnicity: Balkan Turks
- Native speakers: 460,000 (2019)
- Language family: Turkic: Common Turkic; Oghuz; Western Oghuz; Turkish; Balkan Gagauz Turkish

Language codes
- ISO 639-3: bgx
- Glottolog: balk1254
- ELP: Balkan Gagauz Turkish

Balkan Gagauz Turkish, Balkan Gagauz, Balkan Turkish or Rumelian Turkish (Turkish: Rumeli Türkçesi), is a Turkic language spoken in European Turkey, in Dulovo and the Deliorman area in Bulgaria, the Prizren area in Kosovo, and the Kumanovo and Bitola areas of North Macedonia. Dialects include Gajal, Gerlovo Turk, Kyzylbash, Surguch, Tozluk Turk, Yuruk (Konyar, Yoruk), Prizren Turk, and Macedonian Gagauz.

Although it is mutually intelligible with both Gagauz and Turkish to a considerable degree, it is usually classified as a separate language, due to foreign influences from neighboring languages spoken in the Balkans.

Balkan Gagauz Turkish was given international prominence through the Oscar-nominated 2019 film Honeyland, in which the protagonist is an ethnic Macedonian Turk and mostly speaks in the local dialect throughout the film.

== Population ==
There were around 460,000 speakers of Balkan Gagauz Turkish in Turkey in 2019 and an estimated 4,000 in North Macedonia in 2018.
